= September 2018 inter-Korean summit =

Summit between North and South Korea

September 2018 inter-Korean summit South Korea: 2018년 남북정상회담 North Korea: 2018년 북남수뇌상봉
- 18–20 September 2018
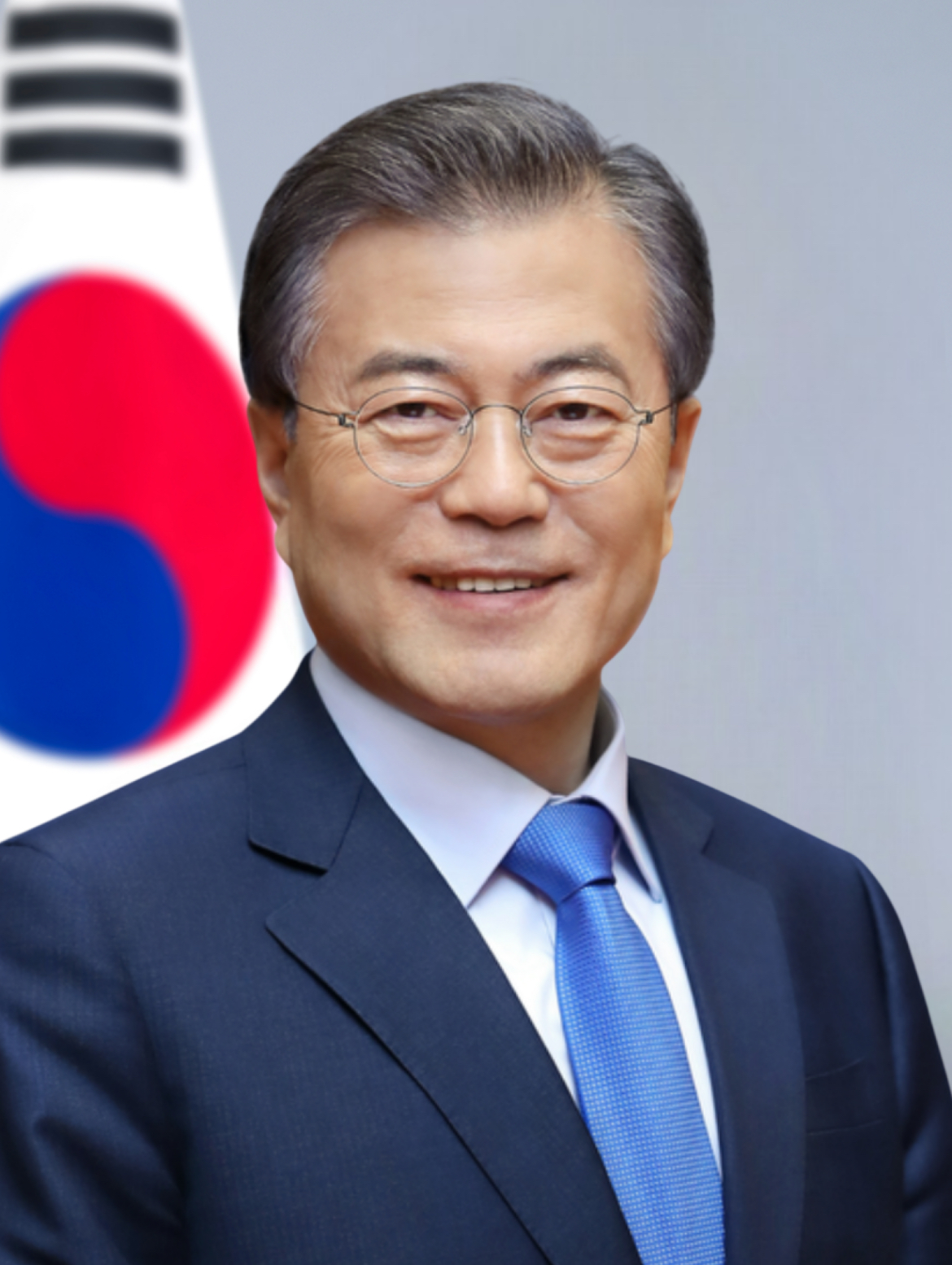
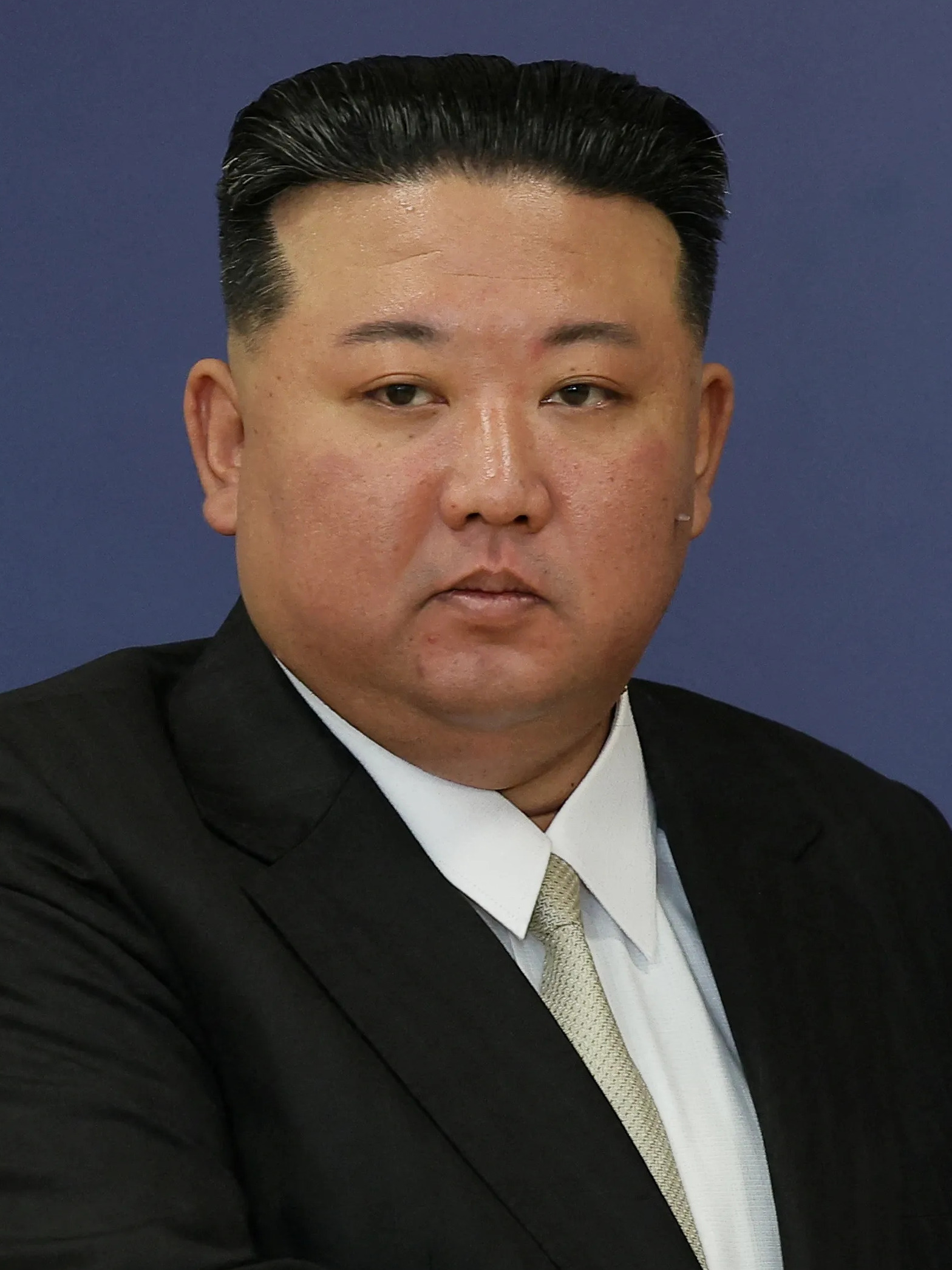
- South Korean president Moon Jae-in (left) and North Korean supreme leader Kim Jong Un (right).
- Host country: North Korea
- Motto: 평화, 새로운 미래 平和, 새로운 未來 (Peace, A New Future)
- Venues: Pyongyang
- Participants: (North Korea) Kim Jong Un (South Korea) Moon Jae-in
- Website: 2018 Inter-Korean Summit

The September 2018 inter-Korean summit was a meeting between South Korean president Moon Jae-in and North Korean leader Kim Jong Un held between 18 and 20 September 2018, in Pyongyang. It was the third and final inter-Korean summit in the 2018–19 Korean peace process.

On 13 August, the Blue House announced that President Moon Jae-in plans to attend the third inter-Korean summit with Kim Jong Un at Pyongyang in September as expected. The agenda was finding the strategy of the breakthrough in its hampered talks with the United States and solution for the denuclearization on the Korean Peninsula. This was the first visit by a South Korean president to Pyongyang in 11 years. On 19 September, the two countries signed the Pyongyang Joint Declaration and the Military Agreement aimed at fulfilling the Panmunjom Declaration, agreeing to end military hostilities, expand economic and cultural cooperation, achieve denuclearization of the Korean Peninsula, and prohibit military training along the military demarcation line.

== Name ==
On 7 September 2018, the Blue House announced that the official name of the summit was “2018 North-South Korean Summit in Pyongyang” (Korean: 2018 남북정상회담, 평양), and the slogan was “Peace, New Future” (Korean: 새로운미래). Blue House spokesperson Kim Eui-kyeom explained that the slogan “expresses the national aspiration of North and South Korea to join hands in opening up the future during this important period when the Korean Peninsula is facing a historic turning point”. In addition, the slogan was printed on press releases and various brochures.

== Background ==
=== Previous talks ===
During the April 2018 inter-Korean summit, South Korean President Moon Jae-in and North Korean leader Kim Jong Un signed the Panmunjom Declaration, agreeing that Moon would visit Pyongyang in the autumn 2018. Subsequently, relations between the two Koreas became friendly, and the leaders of the two countries met again in May. Then, they held general-level talks, sports talks and Red Cross talks. The Inter-Korean Liaison Office located in Kaesong, a border city in North Korea, was opened on 14 September. At the same time, the annual defense white paper published by the South Korean Ministry of National Defense removed the phrase "the North Korean regime and army are our enemies". The two countries also frequently conducted sports exchanges. The South Korean men's and women's basketball teams visited Pyongyang in July to participate in a friendly match, North Korea sent the General Federation of Trade Unions of Korea to participate in the North-South Workers' Football Match, and the two countries formed a joint team to participate in the 2018 World Team Table Tennis Championships and the 2018 Asian Games. In August, the two countries held a reunion event for separated families from the North and South again after two years.

However, North Korea and the United States were deadlocked on how to handle the denuclearization of the Korean Peninsula. In June 2018, Kim Jong Un signed a joint statement with U.S. President Donald Trump at the North Korea-U.S. Singapore summit, pledging to work toward the complete denuclearization of the Korean Peninsula. However, the two countries disagreed on the procedures: the U.S. demanded that North Korea take new denuclearization measures first, while Pyongyang demanded that the U.S. issue a declaration to end the war guaranteeing its regime. To this end, North Korea advocated for another summit meeting between the two countries at the high-level inter-Korean talks on 13 August, which the Blue House agreed to. Thus, the two sides agreed to hold a summit meeting in September of the same year, but the specific date was not set. Subsequently, North Korea and the United States continued to be deadlocked on the issue of denuclearization. On 24 August, Trump instructed Secretary of State Mike Pompeo to cancel his planned visit to North Korea because the "progress of North Korean denuclearization was too slow." In response, Kim Yong-chol, director of the United Front Department of the Workers' Party of Korea, told the United States on 29 August that if there was no further progress in the nuclear negotiations between the two sides, North Korea might “restart nuclear weapons and missiles”. In order to resolve the dispute between the two countries, Moon Jae-in sent a special delegation to Pyongyang on 5 September to discuss the date of the summit and denuclearization. On 5 September 2018, South Korean National Security Advisor Chung Eui-yong, National Intelligence Service Director Suh Hoon and other delegates travelled to North Korea to hold a meeting with Kim Jong Un, where they arranged the summit and help rescue faltering nuclear diplomacy between the United States and North Korea. The two sides decided to hold a summit from 18 to 20 September, with the topics being the establishment of a mutual trust mechanism, prevention of armed conflict and specific methods for promoting denuclearization. South Korean officials have insisted that Kim Jong Un has set a proposed denuclearization timetable and is working with Trump to achieve this goal.

=== Preparation ===
The summit was held on the eve of North Korea's Day of the Foundation of the Republic. To create a friendly atmosphere, North Korea did not display intercontinental ballistic missiles or ballistic missiles during the military parade on the founding day. On the same evening, a segment commemorating the inter-Korean summit in April of the same year was added to the performance of "The Glorious Motherland". In South Korea, considering that North Korea had just completed its founding day celebrations, in order to reduce the burden on Pyongyang, the Blue House sent only a delegation of 200 people to this summit, the smallest delegation to date.

On 14 September, officials from both countries held a preparatory meeting at Panmunjom to discuss details such as the format of Moon Jae-in's visit to Pyongyang, the meeting schedule, and security arrangements. On 16 September, South Korea sent an advance team of 93 people to Pyongyang to make final preparations for the meeting. On the same day, the Blue House announced the list of 14 official accompanying personnel:

- Chung Eui-yong, Director of the Office of National Security
- Kang Kyung-wha, Minister of Foreign Affairs
- Cho Myoung-gyon, Minister of Unification
- Song Young-moo, Minister of National Defense
- Suh Hoon, Director of the National Intelligence Service
- Do Jong-hwan, Minister of Culture, Sports and Tourism
- Kim Hyun-mee, Minister of Land, Infrastructure and Transport
- Kim Young-choon, Minister of Oceans and Fisheries
- Kim Jae-hyun, Director of the Korea Forest Service
- Kim Hyun-cheol, Economic Advisor to the Presidential Policy Office
- Kwun Hyuk-ki, Director of the Presidential Security Service
- Kim Eui-kyeom, Blue House spokesperson
- Kim Jong-cheon, Protocol Secretary of the Presidential Secretariat
- Yoon Geon-young, Director of the National Situation Office of the Presidential Secretariat

In addition, South Korea also sent 52 special entourage members from various sectors including politics, economy, society, culture, and civil society.

== The summit ==
=== 18 September (Day 1) ===
The summit began as scheduled on 18 September and lasted three days. South Korean President Moon Jae-in said at a staff meeting the day before his departure that he would “frankly face off” with Kim Jong Un and communicate on denuclearization and the elimination of hostile relations, and stressed that the establishment of a permanent peace mechanism on the Korean Peninsula was not subject to international influence. At 8:40 a.m. the next day, Moon Jae-in and his wife Kim Jong-suk led a delegation of members from Seoul Air Base and flew over the Yellow Sea to Pyongyang by special plane. This route was the same as that taken by Kim Dae-jung when he visited North Korea in 2000. At 9:50 a.m., the special plane arrived at Pyongyang Sunan International Airport, where Moon Jae-in and his wife were they got a rousing reception, which featured a marchpast by the guard of honor and the Central Military Band of the Korean People's Army. They were greeted by Kim Jong Un, who embraced Moon, and his wife Ri Sol-ju. Then, Moon Jae-in inspected the guard of honor of the Korean People's Army, and the commander shouted “Here is the ceremony to welcome His Excellency the President” and fired a 21-gun salute. In the previous summits, the gun salute ceremony was omitted due to the special relationship between the two countries. At the same time, it was unprecedented for Moon Jae-in to be addressed as “Your Excellency the President” by North Korea. Shortly afterward, Moon Jae-in shook hands with North Korean senior officials, including Kim Yong-nam, President of the Presidium of the Supreme People’s Assembly, and Choe Ryong-hae, Vice Chairman of the Central Committee of the Workers’ Party of Korea, while Kim Jong Un spoke with members of the South Korean official delegation.

At 10:20 a.m., Kim Jong Un and Moon Jae-in left the airport together in an open-top car and toured the city center, passing the Three Revolutions Exhibition, the Immortality Tower, Ryomyong Avenue and the Kumsusan Palace of the Sun. Along the way, the two waved to the people holding the Korean Reunification Flag and the flag of North Korea. An hour later, Moon Jae-in arrived at the Paekhwawon State Guest House where he was staying to rest and have lunch. At 3:45 p.m., the two leaders, together with Suh Hoon, director of the South Korean National Intelligence Service, Chung Eui-yong, director of the Office of National Security of the Blue House, Kim Yo Jong, first vice minister of the Central Committee of the Workers' Party of Korea, and Kim Yong-chol, vice chairman of the Central Committee of the Workers' Party of Korea, held talks at the headquarters building of the Workers' Party of Korea. In his opening remarks, Kim Jong Un thanked Moon Jae-in for achieving the "historic" summit between the leaders of North Korea and the United States, and pointed out that the situation on the Korean Peninsula has gradually stabilized after the summit between the leaders of North Korea and the United States. He believed that the dialogue between North Korea and the United States could bring more fruitful results. Moon Jae-in expressed his gratitude to Kim Jong Un for “decisively deciding to usher in a new era”. On the other hand, the two first ladies, Kim Jong-suk and Ri Sol-ju, visited the Okryu Children’s Hospital and the Pyongyang University of Music and Dance. The South Korean special delegation met with Kim Yong-nam, President of the Presidium of the Supreme People’s Assembly, and representatives of the business and public sector met with Ri Yong-nam, Vice Premier of North Korea. Representatives of political parties met with An Dong-chun, Vice Chairman of the Supreme People’s Assembly, and representatives of society met with Kim Yong-dae, Chairman of the Central Committee of the Korean Social Democratic Party, at the People’s Palace of Culture.

At 6:30 p.m., the two leaders and their spouses appeared at the Pyongyang Grand Theater to watch the performance of the Samjiyon Orchestra. Two hours later, North Korea held a welcome banquet for South Korea at the Mokran Hall. In his welcoming speech, Kim Jong Un said that in order to fulfill the Panmunjom Declaration, he would "strive to achieve a new era of peace and a prosperous history for the nation", and emphasized that "there are still many difficulties on the road ahead", but as long as the two countries work together, they will be able to "move forward with greater strength". Moon Jae-in then spoke, expressing his deep gratitude to the North Korean compatriots who gave him a warm welcome on the streets this morning, and conveying the greetings of the South Korean compatriots. He also pointed out that the two countries would seriously discuss the issues of denuclearization and the complete elimination of military tensions between the two sides in this meeting; the fact that the two leaders met at any time and place proved that a new era of inter-Korean relations had arrived.

=== 19 September (Day 2) ===
At 10 a.m., Kim Jong Un and Moon Jae-in held a one-on-one meeting at the Paekhwawon State Guest House. The meeting lasted 70 minutes, during which the two sides discussed issues such as the denuclearization of the Korean Peninsula, the development of relations between the two countries, and solutions to ease military tensions. After the meeting, Moon Jae-in and Kim Jong Un signed the Pyongyang Joint Declaration of September 2018, which calls for a military agreement, civilian exchanges and cooperation in many areas, and conditions to denuclearize North Korea. In it, the two countries agreed to end military hostilities in the demilitarized zone, eliminate the crisis of war, launch the North-South Military Joint Committee for regular communication and close consultation, expand economic cooperation, restore the Kaesong Industrial Region and Mount Kumgang Tourist Region, start construction on the railway and highway connecting the West Sea and the Seohae Line, fundamentally solve the problem of separated families, establish a permanent meeting place for separated families in the Mount Kumgang area, further enhance cultural and artistic exchanges, send representatives from both countries to attend cultural performances in Pyongyang and Seoul, form a joint team to participate in the 2020 Tokyo Summer Olympics, jointly bid for the 2032 Summer Olympics and jointly hold the 100th anniversary of the March First Movement, and achieve denuclearization of the Korean Peninsula, while North Korea would allow experts to visit the dismantling process of the Dongchang-ri missile launch site. In addition, Kim Jong Un would also visit South Korea within the year.

At the same time, South Korean Defense Minister Song Young-moo and North Korean People's Armed Forces Minister No Kwang-chol also signed the Agreement on Reconciliation, Non-Aggression, Exchanges and Cooperation (aka "Basic Agreement") known as the "Agreement on the Implementation of the Historic Panmunjom Declaration in the Military Domain" (also called the Comprehensive Military Agreement, or CMA) to help ensure less military tension between both countries and greater arms control. The two countries agreed to end the "comprehensive cessation of hostile acts" on 1 November this year: On land, the two countries would completely stop artillery firing training and field maneuver training at the company level and above within 5 kilometers of the military demarcation line; at sea, artillery firing and maritime maneuver training would be prohibited in the waters from the sea south of the Northern Limit Line to the waters south of Tongchon; in the air, tactical training that prohibits the firing of air-to-air missiles and other live ammunition is prohibited in the airspace over the western region. The agreement calls for the removal of landmines, guard posts, weapons, and personnel in the JSA from both sides of the North-South Korean border. The agreement also called for the creation of joint military buffer zones. North Korea agreed to dismantle its nuclear complex in the presence of international experts if the U.S. takes correlative action. North Korea also agreed to complete its dismantling of the Sohae Satellite Launching Station, which started in July 2018, and that the dismantling of Sohae's missile engine test site and launch pad would be observed by international experts as well. Kim Jong Un also pledged to visit the South Korean capital of Seoul "in the near future."

On the other hand, South Korean First Lady Kim Jung-sook and several members of her special delegation visited the Mangyongdae Children's Palace in the morning and watched a performance by local students. Meanwhile, members of the special delegation representing the economic sector visited the Korean People's Army Nursery No. 122, while representatives of the political sector met with Kim Yong-nam, Choe Kum-chol, vice chairman of the Central Committee of the Korean Social Democratic Party, and An Dong-chun, vice chairman of the Supreme People's Assembly. At noon, Moon Jae-in and Kim Jong Un had lunch with members of the South Korean delegation at the Okryu-gwan. At 2:30 p.m., Moon Jae-in participated in a tree-planting ceremony with Choe Ryong-hae at the Paekhwawon State Guest House. The tree, planted by South Korea 10 years ago, symbolizes that the tree will grow strong and bear fruit, just like the relationship between North and South Korea. Subsequently, Kim Sung-hye, head of the United Front Department of the Workers' Party of Korea, and Ri Son-gwon, chairman of the Committee for the Peaceful Reunification of the Fatherland, accompanied Moon Jae-in and his wife to visit the Mansudae Art Studio. Moon Jae-bang wrote on the list: "Art will become a bridge connecting North and South Korea" and viewed the artworks.

At 7 p.m., Kim Jong Un, Moon Jae-in and his wife, and some members of the special delegation dined at the Taedonggang Seafood Restaurant. Before arriving in Pyongyang, Moon Jae-in expressed his wish to have dinner at a restaurant frequented by locals, and Pyongyang recommended this restaurant to him. Two hours later, Kim Jong Un and Moon Jae-in, accompanied by their respective wives, watched the large-scale song and dance drama Arirang at the Rungrado 1st of May Stadium. Moon Jae-in was greeted with a standing ovation and cheers from 150,000 local spectators as he entered the stadium, and delivered a seven-minute speech to the North Korean people present. He became the first South Korean president to publicly address the North Korean people. In his speech, Moon Jae-in calling for cultural unity and reunification of both Koreas. He said that the two countries would build their beautiful land into a country free of nuclear weapons and nuclear threats and leave it to future generations. He also said that the Korean Peninsula has been divided for 70 years, and now is the time to end hostility and move towards a new future. In addition, the Blue House explained that although Moon Jae-in watched "Glorious Country," which tells the story of North Korea's historical perspective, Pyongyang had "taken our position to the greatest extent possible" into account the content.

=== 20 September (Day 3) ===
At 6:39 a.m., Moon Jae-in left the Paekhwawon Guest House in Pyongyang and boarded the South Korean Air Force No. 2 special plane, arriving at Samjiyon Airport at 8:20 a.m. Kim Jong Un and his wife arrived at Samjiyon Airport early in the morning to hold a welcoming ceremony for Moon Jae-in and his wife, and set off together to climb Mount Paektu at around 8:30 a.m. Moon Jae-in and his wife arrived at General Peak with Kim Jong Un and his wife in the same car, and after a short stay at the Alley Station, the train station for traveling to and from Mount Paektu, they took a cable car at 10:10 a.m. and arrived at Cheonchi at 10:20 a.m. When climbing Mount Paektu, Moon Jae-in said that he hoped that the South Korean people could visit the place one day. They then rode vehicles to the mountain on the China–North Korea border. The leaders also rode together in a cable car to reach Heaven Lake, located in a crater atop the mountain's sacred volcano area. Moon was the first South Korean President to visit Mount Paektu. After reaching the lake, Kim and Moon, along with their wives, posed together in front of it for a picture. The mountain's volcano and Heaven Lake is considered to be the most sacred sites in Korean mythology and Kim's family has long identified themselves as the "Mount Paektu bloodline." Before Moon returned to South Korea, a stone marker was dedicated during a tree planting ceremony in Pyongyang to commemorate his trip to North Korea. Kim also shipped two tons of North Korean pine mushrooms, known locally as songyi, across the border before Moon returned as well. Moon press secretary Yoon Young-chan stated that the mushrooms would be given to 4,000 South Koreans who had family members in North Korea. Senior citizens in this group also had the privilege of eating 500 grams each before the Chuseok festival.

Then, after the two leaders had lunch in Samjiyon, Moon Jae-in and his wife and the delegation members would return home. At 3:30 p.m., Moon Jae-in returned to Seoul Seongnam Airport from Samjiyon by special plane, while the other members of the delegation returned home from Pyongyang Sunan International Airport, officially ending the three-day summit.

== Reactions ==
=== Reactions in Korea ===
The press center for this summit was located at Dongdaemun Design Plaza in Seoul, and the information obtained by the reporters covering the summit in Pyongyang was transmitted to the press center in real time. As of 17 September, a total of 2,761 people, including 2,224 South Korean reporters and 447 foreign reporters, came to cover the summit.

In North Korea, the official newspaper Rodong Sinmun published a front-page report on the summit on 18 September, titled “North-South Summit, South Korean President Moon Jae-in Visits Pyongyang,” and emphasized that the summit would further accelerate the development of North-South relations. In the summits of 2000 and 2007, Rodong Sinmun only informed the public that the talks were underway the following day. The day after the summit, the Korean Central News Agency (KCNA) reported in detail on Moon Jae-in’s arrival in Pyongyang, where he was personally greeted by Kim Jong Un and his wife and toured the city. On the third day of the summit, North Korean state media continued to report extensively on the matter. KCNA published seven reports, while Rodong Sinmun devoted four out of six pages to related content, including the signing of the Pyongyang Joint Declaration and the Military Agreement aimed at fulfilling the historic Panmunjom Declaration. On the first day after the talks, KCNA reported that the two leaders had climbed Mount Paektu, calling it a “historic event that will be recorded in the annals of the nation”. That same afternoon, Korean Central Television broadcast footage of the two leaders’ visit to Mount Paektu. The following day, the television station broadcast a 1 hour and 10 minute documentary recounting the process of the summit. In South Korea, the talks were broadcast live by three television stations and six news channels. The combined viewership of the Pyongyang Joint Declaration was 13.76% at the time of its signing.

After signing the Military Agreement aimed at fulfilling the historic Panmunjom Declaration, Moon Jae-in said, "A Korean Peninsula without war has begun. We will turn the peninsula into a permanent peace zone and restore normal life." Upon returning home, Moon Jae-in reiterated the significance of the talks and pointed out that the most important outcome of the meeting was the formulation of a military agreement. Regarding the Pyongyang Joint Declaration, the Blue House argued that it was equivalent to a declaration ending the Korean War.

South Korea's political parties had different views on the talks. The ruling Democratic Party believed that the Pyongyang Joint Declaration had successfully achieved denuclearization, eased military tensions, and promoted inter-Korean exchanges and cooperation, and was a further result of the Panmunjom Declaration. The Party for Democracy and Peace said that the Korean Peninsula would "enter an irreversible phase of peace" through the military agreement. The Bareunmirae Party was relatively neutral, believing that the signing of the agreement would greatly reduce the chances of South Korea being attacked by Pyongyang, but at the same time said that Kim Jong Un's will to implement denuclearization was "still not enough". The Liberty Korea Party criticized the talks for "no progress" and that they had weakened national defense.

Newspapers also held polarized views on the talks. The Hankyoreh stated that Moon Jae-in's ability to speak in front of 150,000 Pyongyang citizens was "unconventional". Kukmin Ilbo pointed out that from Moon Jae-in being addressed as "Your Excellency the President" by the Korean People's Army honor guard to being arranged to meet at the headquarters of the Workers' Party of Korea, it was clear that Pyongyang was treating him with courtesy, which was sufficient to prove the normalization of relations between North and South Korea. However, the Maeil Business Newspaper criticized the talks for focusing only on economic cooperation and for not making any progress on specific plans for denuclearization, namely the declaration and verification of nuclear warheads, nuclear materials, and nuclear facilities. The Chosun Ilbo believed that the South Korean delegation's overly friendly attitude towards North Korea was disrespectful to the victims of the 2010 Yeonpyeondo bombardment and the sinking of ROKS Cheonan.

Nevertheless, the general public was satisfied with the outcome of the talks. After the talks, Realmeter surveyed 501 adult citizens and found that 71.6% of respondents gave a positive evaluation of the talks, 22.1% gave a negative evaluation, and the remaining 6.3% said they did not know or did not answer. In addition, MBC TV surveyed 1,008 adult citizens nationwide on the same day. 82.8% of respondents welcomed Kim Jong Un’s visit to Seoul, 67.8% expressed trust in him, and 29.6% expressed distrust. Gallup Korea conducted a survey after the signing of the Pyongyang Joint Declaration and the military agreement, asking citizens whether they believed that North Korea would fulfill the above agreements. 49% of respondents said they believed, and another 35% thought they would not. After the signing of the Panmunjom Declaration in April of the same year, Gallup Korea asked a similar question, and only 9% of respondents were optimistic at that time.

In North Korea, Rodong Sinmun summarized the summit talks over the past few days as "further consolidating the precious results of North-South cooperation," thus enabling the two countries to "move onto a new track of peace" and "accelerate development on the track of reconciliation and cooperation," "creating a golden age for the cause of unification and marking an epoch-making turning point". The propaganda agency attributed the success of the talks to Kim Jong Un. The KCNA praised Kim Jong Un for "possessing lofty fraternal love and a firm will for unification" and "exerting outstanding political strength" under the title "Outstanding Political Strength Guiding the Cause of Peace and Unification on the Korean Peninsula".

=== International reactions ===
The countries surrounding the Korean Peninsula were certainly involved in the talks. Japanese Chief Cabinet Secretary Yoshihide Suga expressed his hope that the Pyongyang Joint Declaration would lead to the complete denuclearization of the Korean Peninsula and paid tribute to the efforts of the two leaders. Geng Shuang, spokesperson for the Ministry of Foreign Affairs of China, praised the meeting, stating that it produced positive effects easing military tensions, promoting peace talks and the progressing denuclearization process, and looked forward to the second DPRK-US talks being held as soon as possible. The Russian Ministry of Foreign Affairs issued a communiqué welcoming the declaration and suggested that the United States should respond to its previous commitments to North Korea and take constructive actions. In the United States, President Trump said that "things are going very well." On the other hand, Secretary of State Mike Pompeo said that the United States would hold talks with North Korea on nuclear weapons. UN Secretary-General António Guterres also affirmed the talks and praised the positive performance of the two leaders during the talks.

The overseas media gave different evaluations of the talks. Chinese state media Xinhua News Agency greeted the decision of holding the next inter-Korea leaders' summit in Pyongyang. Xinhua expressed that the U.S. has had a vital impact on the "Korean Peninsula issue" and requested on Washington to play a more dynamic role in regional matters. Xinhua also viewed negatively the United States' North Korea policy with "maximum pressure" although Pyongyang has made efforts to "shut down" the Punggye-ri primary nuclear test site, return the remains of the U.S. soldiers from the Korean War, and stimulate negotiations between North and South. CNN reported on the matter on its front page with the headline "The Age of No War Has Arrived". The Wall Street Journal headlined it "North Korea Allows Foreign Experts to Inspect Nuclear Weapons," and said it was Kim Jong Un's "bold strategy" that would break the deadlock with the United States and bring new hope. Scholar Andrei Lankov said in his column for NK News that the two countries "went in the right direction" in the talks. However, The Washington Post criticized the two leaders for not putting forward any concrete plans on denuclearization. The Associated Press also said it was a pity that the two countries did not mention a nuclear list and a phased timetable.

== Aftermath ==
On Chuseok, Moon Jae-in delivered a national address, stating that the Korean people can only become strong by uniting as one. He said that the recently concluded Pyongyang summit had removed the threat of war on the peninsula and would open a new path for North and South Korea. At the same time, he would meet with Trump on the eve of the upcoming seventy-third session of the United Nations General Assembly to discuss the situation on the Korean Peninsula. On 24 September, the two met in New York City. Moon said that Kim Jong Un hoped to hold denuclearization negotiations with the United States as soon as possible, and emphasized that Pyongyang had put the issue of denuclearization on the agenda. In response, Trump thanked Moon Jae-in for his efforts for peace on the Korean Peninsula and said that the second North Korea-US summit was "about to be finalized". Moon also met with UN Secretary-General António Guterres, who praised Moon for his efforts in denuclearization of the Korean Peninsula and the establishment of a permanent peace mechanism, and said that he would provide support for the peninsula issue and was willing to call on the international community to pay attention to the issue.

On 21 September, Yonhap News Agency quoted South Korean conglomerate CJ Group chairman Sohn Kyung Shik saying that Kim Jong Un's visit to Seoul would occur in December 2018. On 25 September, Moon attended an event held by the Council on Foreign Relations in the United States and stated that the declaration to end the Korean War was the "inevitable path" to a peace mechanism on the Korean Peninsula and a necessary condition for denuclearization of the peninsula. In an interview with Fox News, he said that North and South Korea and the United States had reached a consensus on the declaration to end the war. In addition, Moon held talks with Japanese Prime Minister Shinzo Abe and mentioned the normalization of Japan–North Korea relations. The next day, Moon said at the UN General Assembly that "miraculous things" had happened on the Korean Peninsula in the past year, and that the many talks had gradually turned the situation on the peninsula from danger to safety. He requested world to acknowledge 'positively' to Kim Jong Un's 'new choices' to inspire denuclearisation, which he said would eventually lead the peninsula to a permanent and stable path of peace. At the same time, the U.S. State Department announced that Secretary of State Mike Pompeo would visit North Korea in October to prepare for the second North Korea-U.S. summit with senior officials in Pyongyang. On 7 October, Pompeo met with Kim Jong Un, and the two exchanged views on the recent situation on the Korean Peninsula and methods for denuclearization, and agreed to hold a summit meeting between the leaders of the two countries as soon as possible. Regarding the location of the meeting, Trump indicated that three or four places have been selected, including Pyongyang and Washington. On 25 October, the two countries lifted the arms and borders of the Joint Security Area, allowing tourists and citizens to freely enter and exit the area.

North Korea also attended the United Nations General Assembly. Foreign Minister Ri Yong-ho stressed at the Non-Aligned Movement on 28 September that now is a critical period for building peace. On 29 September, Ri said at the General Assembly that North Korea’s determination to pursue denuclearization was “unwavering”, but that denuclearization could only be achieved when the United States could make them feel trusted. Among these measures, sanctions in particular exacerbated Pyongyang’s distrust of the United States. US Secretary of State Mike Pompeo earlier assembled with Ri Yong-ho in New York and announced that it's very positive gathering with DPRK during UNGA (General Assembly) to discuss upcoming Trump-Kim summit and next steps toward denuclearization of North Korea.

On the other hand, the summit meeting ensured that North and South Korea maintained friendly relations. On 27 September, the Korean Paralympic Committee announced that the two countries would form a joint team to compete in swimming and table tennis at the 2018 Asian Para Games and march together with the unification flag at the opening ceremony, marking the first time that North and South Korea marched together at an international Paralympic Games. The following day, the Ministry of Unification announced that the two countries would hold a commemorative event in Pyongyang from 4 to 6 October to mark the 11th anniversary of the signing of the North-South Joint Declaration, and that the Blue House would send 150 people to attend the celebration. On the same day, representatives of the two countries held a meeting at the Inter-Korean Liaison Office to discuss the implementation of the Pyongyang Joint Declaration. After discussions, the two countries agreed to conduct on-site surveys of the railway and highway connection project between the east and west coasts and to submit a formal proposal to the International Olympic Committee to jointly apply to host the 2032 Summer Olympics.

On 1 October, in order to implement the Panmunjom Declaration, the North and South Korean armies, together with the United Nations forces, carried out mine clearance operations in the Joint Security Area and the Demilitarized Zone. On 4 October, Pyongyang allowed a South Korean delegation to participate in a joint celebration of the 11th anniversary of the 4 October Declaration. This event also commemorated the 100th anniversary of the March First Movement and was one of the commitments in the Pyongyang Declaration. On 15 October, the two countries held high-level talks at the Peace House in Panmunjom to discuss how to implement the Pyongyang Joint Declaration. The two countries agreed to hold Red Cross talks in November of the same year to discuss the reunification of separated families, and to launch a groundbreaking ceremony for the railway and road connection project between November and December. On 23 October 2018, Moon ratified both the Pyongyang Declaration and the CMA just hours after they were approved by his cabinet. Following the approval, it was acknowledged that the South Korean Constitution allows the President to approve treaties without consent from the National Assembly so long as they do not "give huge financial burdens to the people."

On 30 October 2018, members of a South Korean ad hoc parliamentary special committee on inter-Korean economic cooperation held its first meeting and saw members of both the ruling and opposition parties agree to restore inter-Korean economic cooperation which has ceased for about 10 years and to normalize operations of the now-shuttered North Korean Kaesong Industrial Region and the suspended joint tour project on Mount Kumgang, also located in the North, when conditions are met. Joint economic zones in these two areas were also commitments of the Pyongyang Declaration. Some commitments of the Pyongyang Declaration which had been scheduled to be held in October 2018 were not upheld. Among them were a joint survey for a cross-border railway and sports and health meetings to bolster exchange in the respective areas. A Pyongyang art troupe also did not hold a scheduled performance in Seoul. The Pyongyang Declaration called for a Pyongyang art troupe to hold a performance in Seoul sometime in October 2018 as well. On 31 October, Kim Min-ki of the ruling Democratic Party issued a statement revealing that officials from South Korea's National Intelligence Service had observed several of North Korea's nuclear and missile test sites and that they were now ready for the upcoming international inspections. Kim also stated the now inactive Punggye-ri Nuclear Test Site and the Sohae Satellite Launching Station were included in these observations. The visit by the intelligence officials was also meant to make preparations for the international experts to observe the dismantling of the North Korean nuclear and missile test sites as well. The international experts will also be allowed to witness the dismantling of other North Korean nuclear and missile test sites as well. Yongbyon, the last nuclear facility in North Korea which has yet to be closed, has also been inactive during the past year as well.

The summit also directly boosted Moon Jae-in’s approval rating at home. Gallup Korea surveyed 1,001 adult citizens between 18 and 20 September, and the survey report indicated that 61% of respondents said he could fulfill the duties of president, while 31% disagreed. Compared to the same survey conducted last week, his approval rating rose by 11% and the disapproval rate decreased by 9%. In addition, South Korean media discussed after the summit whether Moon Jae-in, Kim Jong Un and Trump could win the Nobel Peace Prize together. YTN believed that Moon Jae-in facilitated three inter-Korean summits and created a peaceful atmosphere on the Korean Peninsula, but at the same time, Kim Jong Un, due to his status as a dictator, would find it difficult to win the prize. Yonhap News Agency also cooled down the topic, saying that because the list of candidates for the Peace Prize is confidential, it is difficult to predict who will win. The Blue House held the same attitude. In an interview with The Hankyoreh, a spokesperson said that the government had "no particular expectations or ideas" regarding the Peace Prize. In the end, the prize was awarded to Nadia Murad and Denis Mukwege.

On 12 March 2019, a report released by the UN Security Council Sanctions Committee on North Korea experts pointed out that Kim Jong Un's high-class car was an embargoed item that violated the sanctions resolution against North Korea. However, the report chose a photo of Moon Jae-in and Kim Jong Un riding together in a Mercedes-Benz touring Pyongyang during the talks in order to illustrate the point. Although the South Korean Ministry of Foreign Affairs was aware of this in November 2018 and suggested using a different photo, the report still used this photo.

=== Gifts ===
On 27 September 2018, Kim honored a request Moon made during the summit and gave the South Korean leader two rare Pungsans, Korean hunting dogs, named Gomi and Songgang. On 8 November 2018, Moon's office declared the mushrooms safe to eat and were not affected by North Korea's history of nuclear testing. On 11 November 2018, South Korea airlifted 200 tons of tangerines to North Korea from Jeju Island as a goodwill gesture for the mushrooms. On 12 November 2018, Gomi, the female Pungsan, gave birth to six "peace gift" puppies. When they were born, Moon tweeted "As the pregnancy period of dogs is about two months, Gomi must have come to us pregnant," and that "I hope inter-Korean affairs will be like this." On 25 November 2018, Moon presented photos of these "peace gift" puppies to the public.

=== Joint Security Area ===
On 1 October 2018, North and South Korean military engineers began a scheduled 20 day removal process of landmines and other explosives planted across the Joint Security Area of the Korean Demilitarized Zone (DMZ). The Joint Security Area would also undergo major changes following the demining as well. It was also agreed that Arrowhead Hill would afterwards undergo demining by both North and South Korean forces and that they would also assist in searching for potential remains of missing soldiers. Around 800,000 landmines were planted along these two regions since the division of Korea. On 19 October 2018, after just 19 days of mine clearing operations by both sides, the United Nations Command announced that both North and South Korea had completed work to remove landmines from the Joint Security Area.

By 25 October 2018, demining had begun at Arrowhead Hill and resulted in the discovery of Korean War remains. Demining at Arrowhead Hill continued until 30 November 2018. Five more sets of remains from the Korean were discovered at Arrowhead Hill on 19 November 2018. By this point in time, a total of nine sets of Korean War remains had been discovered at Arrowhead Hill Arrowhead Hill had previously been selected for both Koreas to conduct a pilot remains recovery project. A pilot inter-Korean Remains Recovery Project is another commitment which was made in the summit's Comprehensive Military Agreement. On 22 November 2018, a DMZ road was reconnected for the first time in fourteen years in an effort to assist with both the demining and exhumation process. Work between both Koreas to remove landmines from Arrowhead Hill was completed on 30 November 2018.

Once the Joint Security Area is demined, the guard posts would cease to exist. The dismantling of Joint Security Area guard posts was completed on 25 October. The destruction of 20 guard posts located along the "front lines" of the Korean DMZ officially began on 11 November 2018. On 15 November 2018, destruction of two DMZ guard posts, one being located in South Korea and the other located in North Korea, was completed. Work was still ongoing to complete the destruction of other guard posts as well. On 23 November, it was revealed that South Korea had slowly been destroying their guard posts with excavators. As destruction of the guard posts began, it was announced that both Koreas had amended the summit's Comprehensive Military Agreement and decided to preserve two of the twenty-two demilitarized frontline guard posts, one on each side of the border.

On 20 November 2018, North Korea, hoping to further ease tensions with South Korea, destroyed all of their 10 remaining "frontline" guard posts. The South Korean Defense Ministry released photos confirming this and also released a statement stating that North Korea had informed them about the plans to demolish them before it took place. This came in accordance with the earlier summit agreements. On 30 November 2018, both Koreas completed work to dismantle 10 of their "frontline" guard posts. The later agreement for each Korea to preserve one "frontline" post was upheld as well. The "frontline" guard post which was preserved on the North Korean side of the DMZ was visited by Kim Jong Un in 2013 when tensions were rising between both Koreas. The destruction of the 10 guard posts and disarmament and destruction of underground structures at all 11 guard posts were confirmed by inter-Korean inspections which took place when inspectors and soldiers from both Koreas crossed into the opposite countries on 12 December 2018.

The Joint Security Area would no longer be armed with weapons of any kind after it is demined as well. Official disarmament of this area was completed on 25 October. Removal of weapons from all of the DMZ's 22 "frontline" guard posts was completed on 10 November 2018. Any military personnel, regardless of their country, who is stationed at the Joint Security Area on either side of the border would be forced to withdraw when demining is complete. On 25 October, personnel was replaced with 35 unarmed security guards. Withdrawal of military personnel from all of the DMZ's 22 "frontline" guard posts was completed on 10 November 2018.

=== Inter-Korean Liaison Office ===
The first meeting at the Inter-Korean Liaison Office occurred between delegates from both Koreas on 22 October 2018. The meeting concerned, among other things, forestry cooperation between both Koreas. Forest ecology cooperation was one of the commitments in the Pyongyang Declaration. A meeting later took place at the office between South Korean Vice Minister of Culture, Sports and Tourism Roh Tae-kang and North Korean Vice Minister of Physical Culture and Sports Won Kil U on 2 November 2018, talks at the office resulted in agreements for a unified Korean team at the 2020 Olympics and to hold the 2032 Summer Olympics in both Koreas. Another meeting was held on 2 November 2018 between South Korean Vice Unification Minister Chun Hae-sung and his North Korean counterpart, Jon Jong-su. Both men are co-heads of the office and each serve as liaison chief for their perspective country. Both Chun and Jon discussed cooperation in various joint-Korean projects. Following the meeting, it was reported that inter-Korean on-site railway inspections and a performance by a Pyongyang art troupe in Seoul were issues which remained unresolved. A North Korean art troupe previously performed in Seoul and another South Korean city shortly before the 2018 Winter Olympics.

=== Health cooperation ===
On 7 November 2018, health officials from North and South Korea held talks at the Inter-Korean Liaison Office to discuss health care cooperation. Greater cooperation between both countries in the field of health care was another one of the commitments in Pyongyang Declaration. On 11 December 2018, it was revealed that both Koreas agreed to jointly fight infectious diseases. By February 2019, South Korean doctor Kim Young-hoon, who previously made history by traveling to Pyongyang in 2000 to perform pacemaker surgery, was working in both Koreas to expand health care and medical facilities. He has been head of the Inter-Korea Foundation for Health and Medical Education since it was founded in August 2015.

=== Military cooperation ===
On 1 November 2018, officials from the South Korea's Ministry of Defense confirmed that buffer zones were established across the DMZ by the North and South Korean militaries. In compliance with Comprehensive Military Agreement, the buffer zones help ensure that both Koreas will ban hostility on land, sea and air. The buffer zones stretch from the north of Deokjeokdo to the south of Cho Island in the West Sea and the north of Sokcho and south of Tongchon County in the East (Yellow) Sea. Both North and South Korea are prohibited from conducting live-fire artillery drills and regiment-level field maneuvering exercises or those by bigger units within 5 kilometers of the Military Demarcation Line (MDL). No-fly zones have also been established along the DMZ to ban the operation of drones, helicopters and other aircraft over an area up to 40 km away from the MDL. Both Koreas also established "peace zones" near their disputed Yellow Sea border. A buffer zone was also established in the Yellow Sea's Northern Limit Line (NLL).

On 12 December 2018, soldiers from both Koreas crossed the MDL into the opposition countries for the first time in history. These soldiers, numbers in the dozens, helped verify the destruction of "frontline" guard posts. The verification of the guard post removal was also an objective of the Comprehensive Military Agreement. Accompanying these soldiers were inspectors who confirmed the destruction and disarmament of "frontline" guard posts, as well as the destruction of underground facilities near the guard posts.

On 1 April 2019, excavation work along the Arrowhead Hill in the DMZ for Korean War remains began. However, the agreed inter-Korean project did not take place, as South Korea was working alone. On 8 May 2019, the US Defense Department suspended the remains recovery project.

=== Establishment of Joint Utilization Zones along Han and Imjin River estuaries ===
On 4 November 2018, a 20-member team consisting of 10 people from North Korea and 10 people from South Korea began a joint inter-Korean survey which will lead to the development Joint Utilization Zones along the Han and Imjin River estuaries. The Zones will allow civilians to access the estuary for tourism, ecological protection and the collection of construction aggregate under the protection of militaries from both sides of the Korean border. The establish of this Joint Utilization Zone and a joint survey beforehand is one of the objectives of the Comprehensive Military Agreement On 5 November 2018, the councils of South Korea's Gangwon and Gyeonggi provinces, which border the DMZ, signed a "peace working agreement" at Dorasan Station in Paju, giving local approval to various DMZ's projects, including the Joint Utilization Zones.

The inter-Korean survey of the estuaries in the Han and Imjin Rivers was completed on 9 December 2018. It was announced afterwards that 21 new reefs had been discovered during the joint survey and that the new maps for both of the rivers' estuaries will be made public by 25 January 2019.

=== Unified sports bids ===
In October 2018, both Koreas participated as a united team at the 2018 Asian Para Games. On 4 October 2018, it was announced that both Koreas would also participate as a unified team at the 2019 World Men's Handball Championship as well. On 2 November 2018, officials from both North and South Korea announced that their countries would participate at the 2020 Summer Olympics, held in Tokyo, Japan, as a unified team. The officials from both Koreas also announced that the letters they would send to the International Olympic Committee (IOC) regarding their bids for hosting the 2032 Summer Olympics would also consist of co-host bids so that the Olympic activities would take place in both nations if their bids were accepted as well. Participation as a united team in the 2020 Summer Olympics and other international games, as well as the bid for both Koreas to co-host 2032 Summer Olympic Games, were obligations which were agreed to in the Pyongyang Declaration. On 26 November 2018, the Unesco accepted a joint bid by North and South Korea and granted world cultural heritage status to Korean wrestling. The sport, which consists of traditional wrestling, is known in South Korea as Ssireum and in North Korea as Ssirum.

=== Inter-Korean transportation ===
On 14 October 2018, North and South Korea, agreed to meet the summit's goal of restoring railway and road transportation which had been cut since the Korean War by either late November or early December 2018. On 22 November 2018, North and South Korea completed construction to connect a three kilometer road along the DMZ. This road, which crosses the MDL Korean land border, consists of 1.7 km in South Korea and 1.3 km in North Korea. The road was reconnected for the first time in 14 years in an effort to assist with a process at the DMZ's Arrowhead Hill involving the removal of landmines and exhumation of Korean War remains.

On 24 November 2018, it was announced that the UN Security Council had granted South Korea exemptions from sanctions so that both North and South Korea could finally conduct a planned inter-Korean railway survey. In November 2018, North Korea shut down the railroad link between North and South Korea. However, railroad transportation from South Korea to North Korea resumed again on 30 November 2018, when a South Korean train carrying railroad inspectors entered North Korea. The same day, 30 officials from North and South Korea began an 18-day survey in both Koreas to connect the Korean railroads.

The survey, which had previously been obstructed by the Korean Demilitarized Zone's (DMZ) "frontline" guard posts and landmines located at the DMZ's Arrowhead Hill, consists of a 400-kilometre (248-mile) railroad section between Kaesong and Sinuiju that cuts through the North's central region and northeastern coast. The inter-Korean survey, as well as the railroad ground-breaking ceremony which will follow to symbolize the opening of the new inter-Korean railroad and road in this area, were both objectives of the Pyongyang Agreement. On 30 November 2018, councils of Gangwon and Gyeongui Provinces met at the Dorasan Station in Paju to include the railroad survey as one of many local projects.

On 5 December 2018, the survey of the Gyeongui (Seoul-Sinuiju) railway line was completed. On 8 December 2018, an inter-Korean survey began for the Donghae railway. South Korean railway inspectors traveled into North Korea by bus before the survey began. Plans have also been made to extend the inter-Korean road surveying to include the road connecting Goseong in South Korea's Gangwon Province and Wonsan in North Korea's Kangwon Province A joint inter-Korean survey of the road in North Korea which connects Kaesong to Pyongyang was previously conducted in August 2018.

On 13 December, it was announced that the groundbreaking ceremony to symbolize the reconnection of the roads and railways in both Koreas will be held on 26 December 2018 in Kaesong. On 17 December 2018, the latest inter-Korean railway survey, which involved an 800-kilometer rail from Kumgangsan near the inter-Korean border to the Tumen River bordering Russia in the east, was completed. South Korean inspectors afterwards returned home by bus. A threat to the groundbreaking ceremony emerged after it was revealed that the North Korean railway was in poor condition. On 21 December 2018, however, the United States agreed to no longer obstruct plans by both Koreas to hold a groundbreaking ceremony. The same day, a four day inter-Korean road survey began when ten working-level South Korean surveyors entered North Korea to work with ten North Korean surveyors on a three day survey 100-kilometer-long section on the eastern Donghae Line. On 24 December 2018, the four-day survey was completed after a separate team of ten South Korean surveyors entered North Korea and joined ten North Korean surveyors to survey a 4-kilometer-long road in Kaesong. On 26 December 2018, the groundbreaking ceremony was held as scheduled in Kaesong. About 100 South Korean officials attended the ceremony after traveling to North Korea by train.

== See also ==
- 2017–18 North Korea crisis
- 2018 inter-Korean summit (April)
- 2018 inter-Korean summit (May)
- 2018 North Korea–United States Singapore Summit
- 2018–19 Korean peace process
- Inter-Korean House of Freedom
- Inter-Korean summits
- Kim–Xi meetings
- Korean reunification
- List of international trips made by Kim Jong Un
- North Korea–South Korea relations
- Northern Limit Line
- Peace Treaty on Korean Peninsula
