= 2007 inter-Korean summit =

Korean summit was held in 2007 for North and South Korea

- 2–4 October 2007
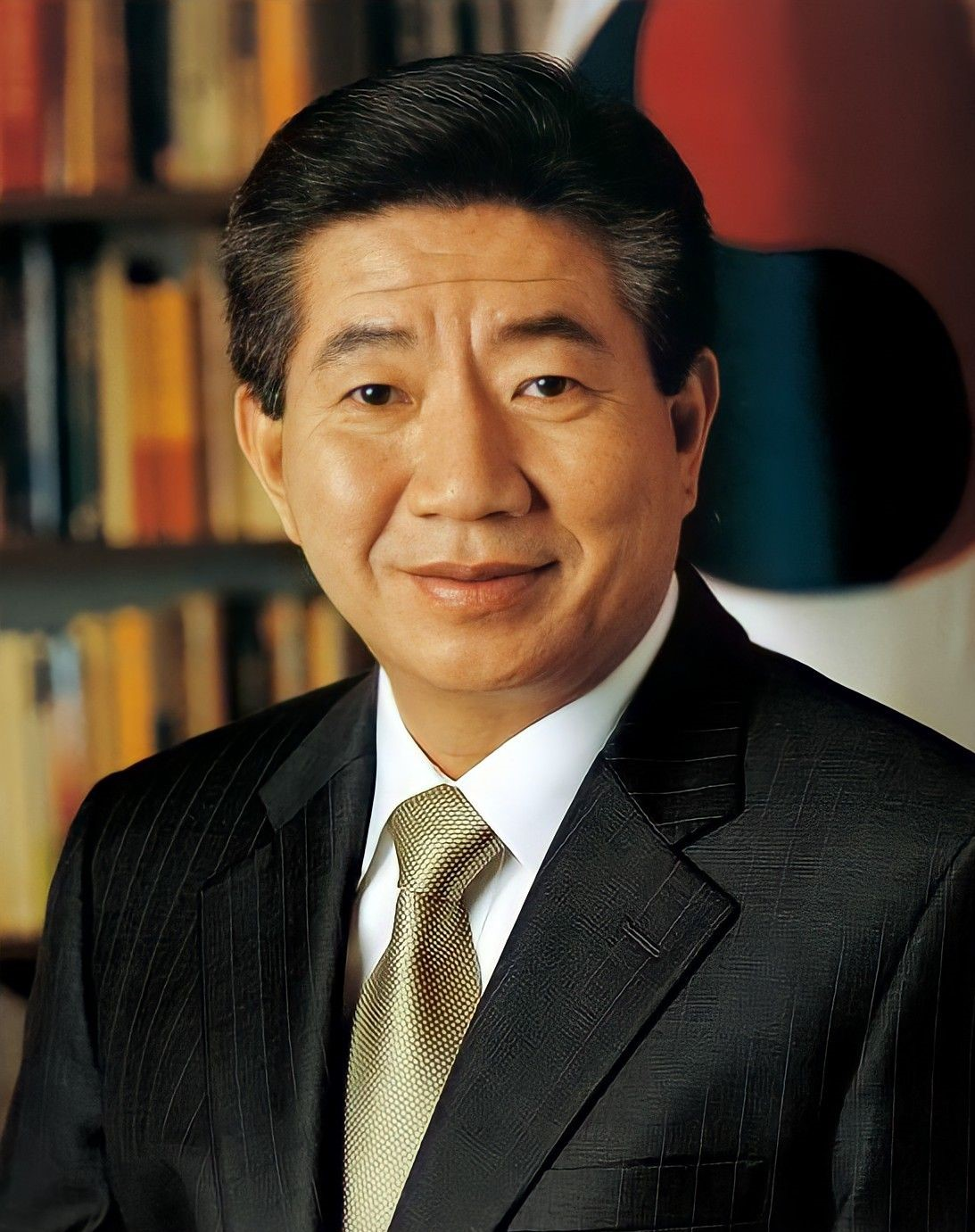
- South Korean president Roh Moo-hyun (left) and North Korean supreme leader Kim Jong Il (right).
- Host country: North Korea
- Venues: Pyongyang
- Participants: (North Korea) Kim Jong Il (South Korea) Roh Moo-hyun

The 2007 inter-Korean summit was a meeting between South Korean president Roh Moo-hyun and North Korean leader Kim Jong Il held between 2 October and 4 October 2007, in Pyongyang. It is the second inter-Korean summit following the 2000 inter-Korean summit. It is also called the 10.4 Inter-Korean summit. Before the meeting, Roh Moo-hyun and his wife Kwon Yang-sook crossed the 38th parallel on foot, becoming the first South Korean president to cross the inter-Korean military demarcation line into North Korea. After the meeting, the two countries signed the Declaration on the Development of North-South Relations and Peace and Prosperity, agreeing to hold a summit, sign a peace treaty to formally end the Korean War, hold inter-Korean summits at any time, and develop economic cooperation projects.

== Background ==
=== Proposals for talks ===
Since the 2000 inter-Korean summit, South Korea had hoped to meet with North Korea again. In December 2004, South Korean President Roh Moo-hyun said at a press conference at the Blue House that if talks could be held, "we would accept them at any time and place". However, North Korea’s renewed development of nuclear weapons in 2003, coupled with stalemate in the six-party talks, made inter-Korean talks seem a long way off. However, with North Korea’s initial agreement on denuclearization in 2006, talks were able to get back on track. In January 2007, South Korean Foreign Minister Song Min-soon indicated that there was a "great chance" of a North-South summit meeting being held within the year. A month later, the two countries held a ministerial meeting. During the meeting, Kim Man-bok, director of the National Intelligence Service of South Korea, submitted a letter to North Korean officials requesting secret contact. On 29 July, Kim Yang-gon, director of the United Front Department of the Workers' Party of Korea, replied to the Blue House, requesting Kim Man-bok to secretly visit Pyongyang on 2 and 3 August. Kim Man-bok then visited North Korea as a special envoy of the president to discuss the summit meeting. After returning home, Kim Man-bok informed Roh Moo-hyun of the results of the discussion, who was satisfied with the outcome and considered it the right time to hold the meeting. He also expressed his agreement to hold the meeting to Pyongyang.

Subsequently, on 8 August 2007, the Blue House announced that Roh Moo-hyun and Kim Jong Il would hold talks in Pyongyang from 28 to 30 August. On the same day, the Korean Central News Agency also made the same report. On 18 August, North Korea experienced severe flooding, and Pyongyang requested that the talks be postponed, with the timing to be decided by the Blue House. Ultimately, the talks were rescheduled for 2 to 4 October. On 7 September, the Blue House announced the official list of accompanying personnel for the talks.

- Deputy Prime Minister and Minister of Finance and Economy Kwon O-kyu
- Deputy Prime Minister and Minister of Science and Technology Kim Woo-sik
- Minister of Unification Lee Jae-joung
- Minister of Defense Kim Jang-soo
- Minister of Agriculture and Forestry Lim Sang-kyu
- Minister of Health and Welfare Lee Byung-gyu
- National Intelligence Service Director Kim Man-bok
- Presidential Policy Chief Byun Yang-kyun
- Presidential Security Advisor Paik Jong-cheon
- Presidential Security Service Chief of Staff Yeom Sang-guk
- Presidential Spokesperson Cheon Ho-seon
- Presidential Protocol Secretary Oh Sang-ho
- Presidential Security Policy Secretary Cho Myong-kyun

Compared to the previous meeting, South Korea had three more official accompanying personnel and twice as many ministerial-level personnel. In addition, 49 special accompanying personnel were appointed, who came from the business, religious, cultural and women's fields.

=== Preparations before the talks ===
To facilitate Roh Moo-hyun's visit to Pyongyang, North Korea agreed to allow South Korea to visit by land. During the 2000 summit, South Korean President Kim Dae-jung had to avoid flying over the North Korean military demarcation line, which required the aircraft to detour over the sea west of the Korean Peninsula. In addition, to ensure the smooth running of the talks, the Blue House sent a 35-person advance team to Pyongyang on 18 and 27 September to conduct on-site inspections and determine the hotels, meeting venues, and places to visit during the formal talks. In addition, the inspection team also watched the large-scale cultural performance Arirang to decide whether Roh Moo-hyun would be allowed to watch the politically propaganda-oriented performance during the formal talks. At the same time, considering the working needs of the South Korean delegation, North Korea would lend the delegation 30 mobile phones, but only for use within Pyongyang. The press center for the summit was located at the Seoul Hilton Hotel, where news of the summit was released. In addition, North Korea paved roads in and around Pyongyang and made preparations in the capital in preparation for the summit.

== The summit ==
=== 2 October ===
The talks were held from 2 to 4 October 2007, lasting three days. Roh Moo-hyun led a 300-person delegation to Pyongyang, the capital of North Korea. The delegation included 13 official staff, 49 special staff, 88 ordinary staff, 50 journalists, 98 staff members and live broadcast technicians. At 7:46 a.m. Seoul time on 2 October, Roh Moo-hyun delivered a speech at the Blue House, stating that the focus of the talks was "to achieve peace, stability and economic development," and that he believed the talks could contribute to peace on the Korean Peninsula and in Northeast Asia. Subsequently, Roh Moo-hyun arrived at the 38th parallel in his car. He got out of the car in front of the military demarcation line and gave a short speech, stating that the demarcation line divides the Korean Peninsula in two, bringing endless suffering to the people of both countries and hindering the development of the peninsula. Therefore, as the president of South Korea, he would cross this dividing line. After he returned from Pyongyang, more people would be able to cross this dividing line and travel between the two countries, eventually causing the dividing line to disappear. After speaking, he and his first wife, Kwon Yang-sook, walked across the 38th parallel into North Korea, becoming the first South Korean president to cross this dividing line. Roh Moo-hyun was greeted by Choe Seong-chol, the vice minister of the United Front Department of the Workers' Party of Korea, and then boarded his special car again to go to Pyongyang.

At noon, Roh Moo-hyun and his entourage arrived at the People's Palace of Culture in Pyongyang and met with Kim Yong-nam, Chairman of the Standing Committee of the Supreme People's Assembly of North Korea. They then transferred to an open-top car to attend the welcoming ceremony at the April 25 House of Culture. During the ceremony, they were greeted by hundreds of thousands of local people lining the streets. At the welcoming ceremony, North Korean leader Kim Jong Il, together with Kim Yong-il, Premier of the Cabinet, Kim Il-chol, Minister of the People's Armed Forces, Choe Tae-bok, Chairman of the Supreme People's Assembly, Kim Ki-nam, Secretary of the Central Secretariat of the Workers' Party of Korea, Kang Sok-ju, First Vice Minister of Foreign Affairs, Kim Yong-dae, Vice Chairman of the Standing Committee of the Supreme People's Assembly, and Park Soon-hee, Chairwoman of the Socialist Women's Union of Korea, greeted Roh Moo-hyun and Kwon Yang-sook. The two shook hands and expressed their pleasure at seeing each other. They then inspected the air force honor guard together. After the welcoming ceremony, Roh Moo-hyun and his wife stayed at the Paekhwawon Guest House and had lunch.

At 4 p.m., Roh Moo-hyun met with Kim Yong-nam at the Mansudae Assembly Hall. Before the meeting, Roh wrote on the assembly hall's register of names: "The happiness of the people is the temple of the people's sovereignty". Afterwards, the two countries officially began their talks. The South Korean representatives were Roh Moo-hyun, Kwon O-kyu, Deputy Prime Minister and Minister of Finance and Economy, Kim Woo-sik, Deputy Prime Minister and Minister of Science and Technology, Lee Jae-joung, Minister of Unification, Kim Jang-soo, Director of the National Intelligence Service, Kim Man-bok, Minister of Health and Welfare, Lee Byung-kyu, Minister of Agriculture and Forestry, and Kim Woo-sik, Director of the Blue House Policy Office. The North Korean representatives were Kim Jong Il; Kim Yong-il, Premier of the Cabinet; Roh Tu-chol, Vice Premier of the Cabinet; Kwon Ho-ong, Advisor to the Cabinet Secretariat; Choe Seong-chol, Vice Minister of the United Front Department of the Workers' Party of Korea; Choe Tae-bok, Chairman of the Supreme People's Assembly; Kim Yong-sam, Minister of Railways; Roh Dong-hwi, Minister of Land and Maritime Transport; Choe Chang-sik, Minister of Health; and Lee Kyong-sik, Minister of Agriculture. The two sides discussed the issues that had been prepared beforehand and exchanged views on the "solution to achieve reconciliation and unification". The talks were originally scheduled to last one hour, but ended at 5 p.m., which was too long. Therefore, the planned visit to the exhibition halls of the Three Revolutions Exhibition was cancelled.

At 7 p.m., Roh Moo-hyun attended a welcome banquet at the Mokran Hall. Kim Jong Il did not participate, and the task of entertaining was handed over to Kim Yong-nam. Kim Yong-nam told the attendees at the banquet that the two countries had demonstrated their determination to unify the nation to the world seven years ago, and that the June 15th North–South Joint Declaration was a "common monument" to national unity, unification and prosperity; and that to further improve relations between the two countries and resolve the unification issue, "today is the beginning". Roh Moo-hyun emphasized economic cooperation, saying that if the two countries could make good use of each other's advantages and gradually expand cooperation bases such as the Kaesong Industrial Region, it would become the interests of both North and South Korea, and could eventually develop into an economic community. The banquet lasted for 2 hours and 10 minutes, and Roh Moo-hyun then returned to the Paekhwawon State Guest House to rest.

=== 3 October ===
Two rounds of summit talks will be held the day after the talks, with the theme of "common prosperity between North and South Korea, peace on the Korean Peninsula, reconciliation and unification". The first round of summit talks was originally scheduled to begin at 10:00 a.m. at the Paekhwawon State Guest House, but was eventually moved up by 26 minutes. In addition to Roh Moo-hyun, the South Korean representatives participating in the talks included Kwon O-kyu, Lee Jae-joung, Kim Man-bok and Paik Jong-cheon; the North Korean representatives were Kim Jong Il and Kim Yang-gon. The talks ended at 11:45 a.m., and at Pyongyang’s request, neither side was allowed to disclose the content of the talks. Nevertheless, Blue House spokesperson Chun Ho-sun said that the two leaders "had in-depth discussions". On the other hand, the 49 special entourage members selected by Roh Moo-hyun held special talks with North Korean officials at the People’s Palace of Culture and the Mansudae Assembly Hall in seven areas, including politics, economy, culture and academia. After the special talks, the special entourage visited the Kim Won-gyun Music University, the Mansudae Art Studio, and the Three Revolutions Exhibition in Pyongyang. As for the First Lady Kwon Yang-sook, she visited the Korean Central History Museum and the Korean Academy of Medical Sciences accompanied by North Korean officials.

At noon, Roh Moo-hyun dined at Okryu-gwan. Then at 2:30 p.m., the second round of summit talks continued. Kim Jong Il once asked Roh Moo-hyun to stay in Pyongyang for another day, but then withdrew his statement an hour and a half later. Although the request to stay for another day was not ultimately fulfilled, the two leaders reached a consensus during the talks, and the results of the discussions will be announced tomorrow. Chun Ho-sun also explained that since the two sides had "fully discussed" the matter, it was "okay" not to extend the schedule. At 8 p.m., Roh Moo-hyun and Kim Yong-nam went to the Rungrado 1st of May Stadium to watch the performance of Arirang. Kim Jong Il did not attend. The performance was originally scheduled for 7:30 p.m., but was delayed due to rain. After the performance, Roh Moo-hyun hosted a banquet to thank North Korea for its hospitality over the past few days. The dinner was held at the People's Palace of Culture at 10:10 p.m. Roh Moo-hyun expressed his gratitude for Kim Jong Il's hospitality and pointed out that through this meeting, he once again felt the importance of trust. He also emphasized that the "economic contractual system" is the way to ensure peace on the Korean Peninsula.

=== 4 October ===
The day's agenda included a visit, a joint tree planting, and the issuance of a declaration on the outcome of the talks. At 8 a.m., Roh Moo-hyun and his party departed from Pyongyang to visit the Pyeonghwa Automobile Factory in Nampo, a joint venture between North and South Korean companies. Spending 20 minutes at the factory, they visited the West Sea Barrier at the Posseongdi Dam. There, Roh Moo-hyun inscribed the words: "The people are great." At 1 p.m., Roh Moo-hyun returned to the Paekhwawon Guest House in Pyongyang to announce the outcome of the talks and to sign the Declaration on the Development of North-South Relations and Peace and Prosperity with Kim Jong Il. According to the declaration, the two countries agreed that:

1. North and South Korea adhere to the June 15 Joint Declaration and actively embody it.
2. North and South Korea have decided to transcend differences in ideology and systems and achieve inter-Korean relations based on mutual respect and trust.
3. The two Koreas decided to end their military hostilities and cooperate closely to ease tensions and promote peace on the Korean Peninsula.
4. Both North and South Korea agreed that the current armistice should be ended and a permanent peace mechanism should be established. At the same time, the leaders of the three or four directly related parties will meet in the Korean Peninsula to cooperate in advancing the issue of declaring an end to the war.
5. In order to achieve balanced economic development and common prosperity for both North and South Korea, they have decided to actively develop and continuously expand economic cooperation.
6. North and South Korea have decided to promote exchanges and cooperation in socio-cultural fields such as history, language, education, science and technology, culture and art, and sports, in order to carry forward the nation's long history and excellent culture.
7. Both the North and South Korea decided to actively promote humanitarian cooperation.
8. Both sides decided to strengthen cooperation on the international stage regarding national interests and the rights and interests of overseas compatriots.

In addition, the two countries will continue to expand and develop economic cooperation "under the principle of mutual benefit and common prosperity" and seek balanced development and common prosperity of national economies; establish the "West Sea Peace Cooperation Special Zone" including the Pahaeju area, accelerate the development of the Kaesong Industrial Region, establish shipbuilding cooperation parks in Anbyon County and Nampo City, and promote cooperation in agriculture, medical and health care, environmental protection and other fields; upgrade the existing "North-South Economic Cooperation Promotion Committee" to the "North-South Economic Cooperation Joint Committee" at the vice-premier level; use the West Sea Railway to transport the joint cheering team to the 2008 Beijing Olympic Games; expand the reunion of separated families from the North and South, promote the exchange of audio and video and letters, and carry out normal reunions of separated families after the completion of the Kumgangsan Meeting Place.

Next, Roh Moo-hyun, together with his wife Kwon Yang-sook and Kim Yong-nam, planted a pine tree at the Central Botanical Garden in North Korea to commemorate the inter-Korean summit. The tree was planted in a mixture of soil from North Korea’s Mount Paektu and South Korea’s Hallasan, and was irrigated with water from Heaven Lake in North Korea’s Mount Paektu and Baekrokdam Lake in South Korea’s Jeju Island. At 4:50 p.m., Roh Moo-hyun attended a farewell ceremony at the People’s Palace of Culture, ending his three-day visit. Kim Yong-nam, along with Choi Tae-bok, Kim Yong-il, Park Soon-hee, and others, saw off the South Korean delegation. Roh Moo-hyun then left Pyongyang in a special car, where local citizens shouted slogans such as "Our wish is unification" and "We are one" as they welcomed the South Korean president. At 7:30 p.m., Roh Moo-hyun visited the Kaesong Industrial Region, his last stop in North Korea. There, he affirmed the economic achievements of the industrial complex and called it a symbol of "North-South unity." At the same time, he believed that the industrial city would be successful. At 9 p.m., Roh Moo-hyun left the North Korean border and returned to Dorasan in South Korea, officially ending the summit with North Korea.

== Reports and commentary ==
The Korean Broadcasting System organized a live broadcast of Roh Moo-hyun's journey from the Blue House to crossing the 38th parallel. With permission from North Korea, the reporters from the corporation temporarily crossed the Northern Limit Line and returned to the South Korean border after completing their filming. In addition to broadcasting this footage, CNN also broadcast the scene of Kim Jong Il welcoming Roh Moo-hyun at the People's Palace of Culture. On the North Korean side, as with the summit in 2000, the Korean Central Television (KCTV) did not broadcast the summit live, but only recorded the report. On the first day of the summit, the KCTV broadcast the scene of Roh Moo-hyun and his wife crossing the 38th parallel and the meeting between the two leaders at the People's Palace of Culture. The Chosun Sinbo, published by the General Association of Korean Residents in Japan, indicated that North Koreans rushed home after work to watch the reports on the summit, which became a common topic of conversation among them. On the other hand, the Rodong Sinmun did not report any news about the meeting between the two leaders on the first day of the talks, but reported on it on three of its four pages the following day. The cover headline read, "President Roh Moo-hyun visits Pyongyang, and the great leader Comrade Kim Jong Il welcomes President Roh Moo-hyun." It also emphasized that the leaders would further expand North-South relations based on the spirit of the "North-South Joint Declaration" and "between our nations," and create a new situation of peace, common prosperity, and national reunification on the Korean Peninsula. Subsequently, the "Declaration on the Development of North-South Relations and Peace and Prosperity" was recognized by the North Korean authorities, who said it brought "a new situation of independent reunification" to the Korean Peninsula.

Kim Jong Il gave his presidential guest Roh Moo-hyun four tonnes of prized songi (matsutake mushrooms) worth up to US$2.6 million at their summit. A kilogram of these mushrooms, which is a Korean delicacy, can sell for as much as 600,000 won (US$656) in South Korean stores. Kim Jong Il had 500 boxes of the mushrooms trucked to the border for President Roh to take back after their three-day summit. This was similar to the first summit when Kim Jong Il gave South Korea's then-president Kim Dae-jung three tonnes of the same mushrooms. Roh Moo-hyun had first given Kim Jong Il a collection of South Korean films and television dramas which included his favorite actress Elizabeth Taylor, normally banned in the North, as well as a painted folding screen and a fine tea set.

The talks boosted Roh Moo-hyun’s low approval ratings. A survey of 670 adult citizens conducted by CBS and Realmeter during the talks showed that Roh’s approval rating jumped from 21.5% last week to 30.7%. However, Lee Myung-bak, the presidential candidate of the Grand National Party, was dissatisfied with the outcome of the talks, criticizing Roh for making "economic aid commitments that could become a burden" and believing that South Korea should take a tougher stance against North Korea.

=== International reactions ===
- United Nations: The United Nations welcomed the outcome of the talks, and Secretary-General Ban Ki-moon believed that the declaration was an important step in strengthening inter-Korean cooperation and promoting peace and stability on the Korean Peninsula and in Northeast Asia.
- China: The Ministry of Foreign Affairs of China said that the talks had achieved "positive results" and believed that this would help the peace process on the peninsula.
- United States: The United States focused on the denuclearization of the Korean Peninsula, and the White House was "very pleased" that the leaders of the two Koreas signed a joint declaration, but hoped that North Korea would fulfill its commitment to resolve the nuclear issue.

== Aftermath ==
To resolve the details of the "Declaration on the Development of Inter-Korean Relations and Peace and Prosperity" and to discuss its implementation plan, South Korean Prime Minister Han Duck-soo and Kim Yong-il held a three-day inter-Korean prime ministerial meeting in Seoul starting on 14 November 2007. The two countries reached a consensus on cooperation in areas such as railways, roads and medical care, and signed the "Inter-Korean Prime Ministers' Meeting Agreement", the "Agreement on the Promotion Committee for the Special Zone for Peace and Cooperation in the West Sea" and the "Agreement on the Establishment and Operation of the Joint Committee for Inter-Korean Economic Cooperation". On 27 November 2007, the two countries held a general-level military meeting again after a seven-year hiatus. The two sides discussed the establishment of a joint fishing zone and peace waters, but failed to reach a consensus and did not sign a joint document. However, the situation on the Korean Peninsula changed with the election of Lee Myung-bak, who belonged to the conservative faction, in the presidential election in December 2007. Lee Myung-bak believed that the two progressive former presidents, Kim Dae-jung and Roh Moo-hyun, had too moderate a stance toward North Korea, so he decided to terminate the Sunshine Policy. This directly led to a rapid deterioration in relations between the two countries. North Korean state media Rodong Sinmun said that Lee Myung-bak’s decision "brought disappointment to the nation". In response, North Korea expelled South Korean officials from the inter-Korean exchange and cooperation office in the Kaesong Industrial Region on 27 March 2008, and then test-fired missiles in the West Sea the next day. On 29 March 2008, the North Korean military announced the suspension of inter-Korean dialogue, and the plan to march together under the unification flag at the opening ceremony of the 2008 Beijing Olympic Games was also canceled. In 2010, the sinking of ROKS Cheonan and the Yeonpyeongdo bombardment occurred, which further strained relations between North and South Korea.

A transcript of the summit talks was not placed in the South Korean national archives, which led to later disputes about what exactly was said in discussions. On 8 October 2012, Chung Moon-heon, a member of the Liberty Korea Party, claimed in the National Assembly that Roh Moo-hyun had told Kim Jong Il during the 2007 inter-Korean summit that he was willing to abandon the Northern Limit Line, causing an uproar in the political world. To explain to the public, the National Intelligence Service decided on 24 June 2013 to release the original second-class classified dialogue, and emphasized that Roh Moo-hyun's statement about abandoning the Northern Limit Line was "fabricated and distorted". In the final transcript, it was recorded that Roh had said "I agree with [leader Kim Jong Il] that the Northern Limit Line should be changed." On 17 November, after investigation by the prosecution, it was confirmed that Roh Moo-hyun had not mentioned the Northern Limit Line. In December of the following year, Chung Moon-heon was prosecuted by the Seoul Central District Court and was eventually fined 10 million won. The content of the dialogue at the Blue House public meeting aroused Pyongyang's dissatisfaction. The Committee for the Peaceful Reunification of the Fatherland issued an emergency statement on 27 June 2013, condemning the South Korean government's actions and considering it an insult and a serious provocation. It said the Korean People's Army and the people would not tolerate the South Korean government's reckless actions. After that, no more inter-Korean summits were held until the third meeting in 2018.
