= People's Palace =

People's Palace may refer to:

- People's Palace, Adelaide, a former Salvation Army hostel in Australia
- People's Palace, Brisbane, a former temperance hotel in Australia
- People's Palace, Djibouti City, a monument in Djibouti City, Djibouti
- People's Palace, Glasgow, a museum and glasshouse in Glasgow, Scotland
- People's Palace, Mile End, built in 1886 in the East End of London, and now part of Queen Mary University of London
- People's Palace, the Presidential Palace in Damascus, Syria
- Alexandra Palace, London, also called "The People's Palace"
- Palace of the Parliament, Bucharest, formerly known as "Palace of the People"
- People's Palace (Algiers), a public building in Algiers
- Palais du Peuple (Brazzaville), the presidential palace in Brazzaville, Republic of the Congo
- Palais du Peuple (Guinea), a parliament building in Guinea
- Palais du Peuple (Kinshasa), a parliament building in the Democratic Republic of Congo
- Sultan's Palace, Zanzibar, formerly "The People's Palace"
- People's Palace, Khartoum, between 1971 and 1985, now the Republican Palace, Khartoum

== See also ==
- People's Palace of Culture, a palace and theater in Pyongyang, North Korea
- Maison du Peuple (Brussels), a demolished building in Brussels
