= Minnie James =

British chief librarian and author (1865–1903)

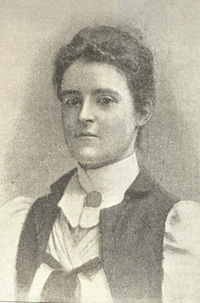
- Born: 7 July 1865; Aldeburgh
- Died: 5 June 1903; Boston
- Occupations: Librarian, writer

Minnie Stewart Rhodes James (7 July 1865 – 5 June 1903) was a chief librarian in London's East End and an author. She was one of the first women to lead a major library and published her ideas on the subject. She went to work for the Library Bureau and moved to work at their head office in Massachusetts.

== Life ==
James was born in 1865 and within a year her mother Sophia Helen (born Courthope) had died. Her father Henry Haughton James who had been in the Indian Navy married again 1867 and he and Annie (born Sparkes) had two more children making a total of five. Her sister was Margaret Helen James, author of Bogie Tales of East Anglia.

James came to notice again after the first People's Palace opened in Mile End in 1886/7 as a source of both training and recreation for the local population. It was a new design by Edward Robert Robson and it was heated by hot water and lit by gas. The octagonal library was based on the Prior's Kitchen of Durham Cathedral and it could hold 250,000 books. It boasted that it employed women librarians at the suggestion of Sir Edmund Hay Currie, who was the chair of the trustees, and Walter Besant. The first two women librarians were called Miss Black and Miss Low. James was employed as an assistant librarian in 1887. The library had an iron spiral staircase that allowed access to the galleries and books could be sent down on wires in brass fittings that could carry 112lb of books.

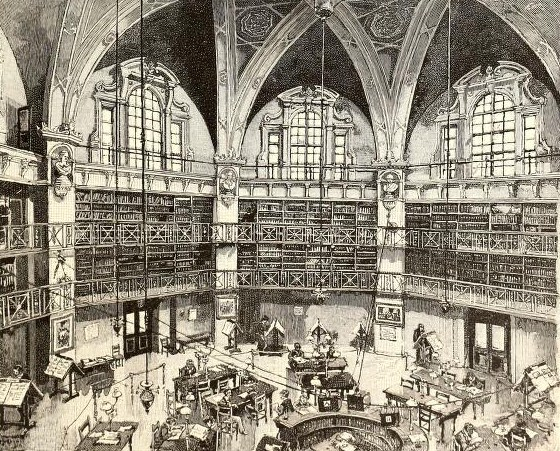
Reading Room at the People's Palace, 1890 magazine illustration.

In 1889 James became one of the first women to lead a major UK library. She understood her working class clientele and she encouraged the reading of novels and she made sure the library opened on Sundays. She joined the Library Association where she founded their summer school in 1893. She joined the Library Assistants Association and she was active in making sure that they received the correct training. She left the People's Palace in 1894 in protest at the poor funding.

She was then employed by the Library Bureau as a librarian until in 1897 she took up the same position for the same company in Boston, Massachusetts. In 1900 she published Women Librarians and Their Future Prospects. She could see enormous opportunity for women in libraries, but she reported that there were "so few such women have been employed in British libraries in really responsible positions". She became ill that year but she would hold her position in Boston until her early death from typhoid fever in 1903.
