= Inter-Korean summits =

Series of meetings between the leaders of North and South Korea

- South Korean name
- Hangul: 남북정상회담
- Hanja: 南北頂上會談
- RR: Nambuk jeongsang hoedam
- MR: Nambuk chŏngsang hoedam

North Korean name
- Hangul: 북남수뇌상봉
- Hanja: 北南首腦相逢
- RR: Bungnam sunoe sangbong
- MR: Pungnam sunoe sangbong

Inter-Korean summits are meetings between the leaders of North and South Korea. To date, there have been five such meetings so far (2000, 2007, April 2018, May 2018, and September 2018), three of them being in Pyongyang, with another two in Panmunjom. The importance of these summits lies in the lack of formal communication between North and South Korea, which makes discussing political and economic issues difficult. The summits' agendas have included topics such as the ending of the 1950-53 war (currently there remains an armistice in force), the massive deployment of troops at the DMZ (approximately two million in total), the development of nuclear weapons by North Korea, and human rights issues.

Originally, the first inter-Korean summit was planned to take place on 25 July 1994 but the death of Kim Il Sung on 8 July, just 17 days prior to the scheduled meeting, meant these plans were abandoned.

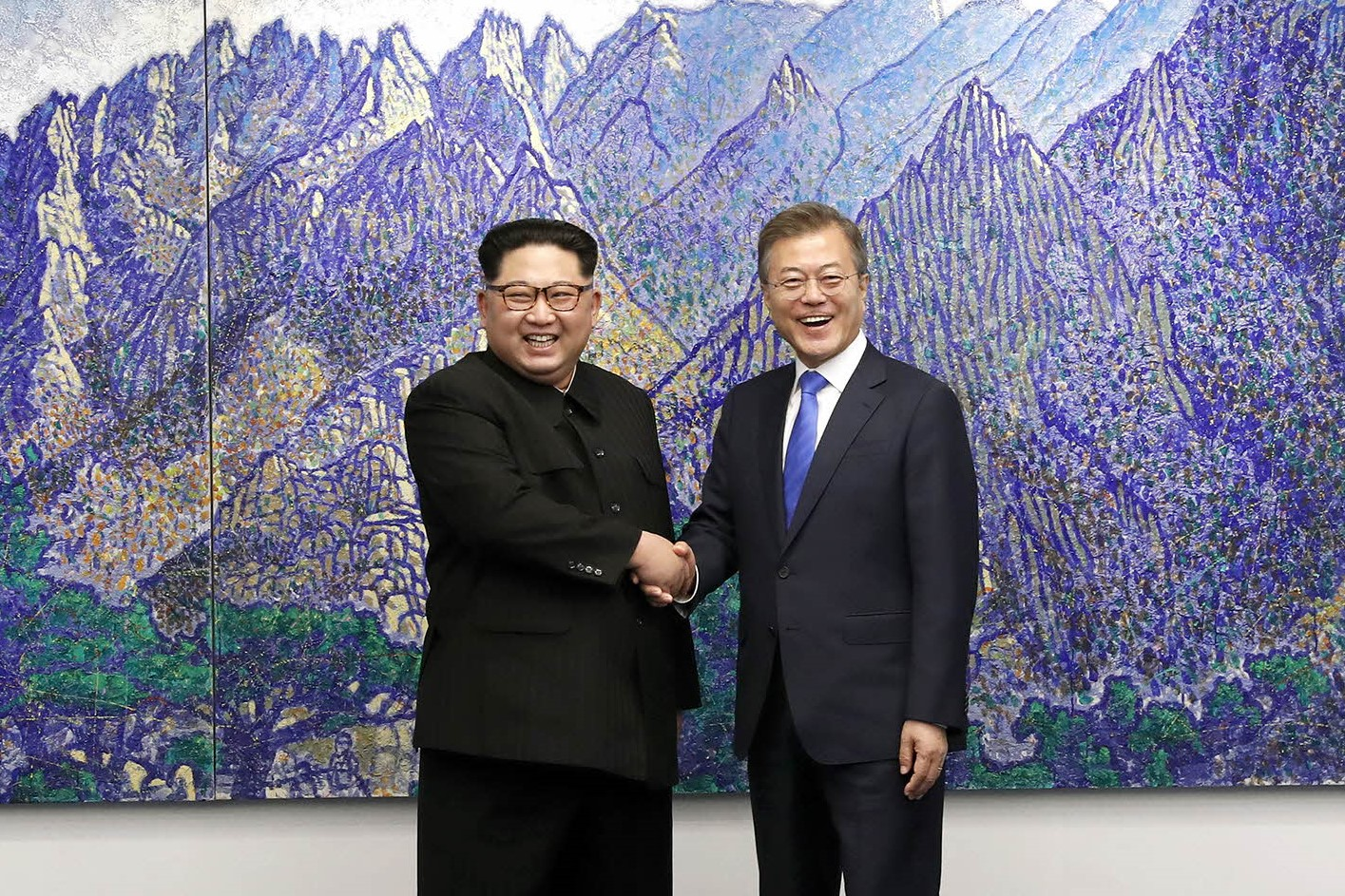
Kim Jong Un and Moon Jae-in shaking hands

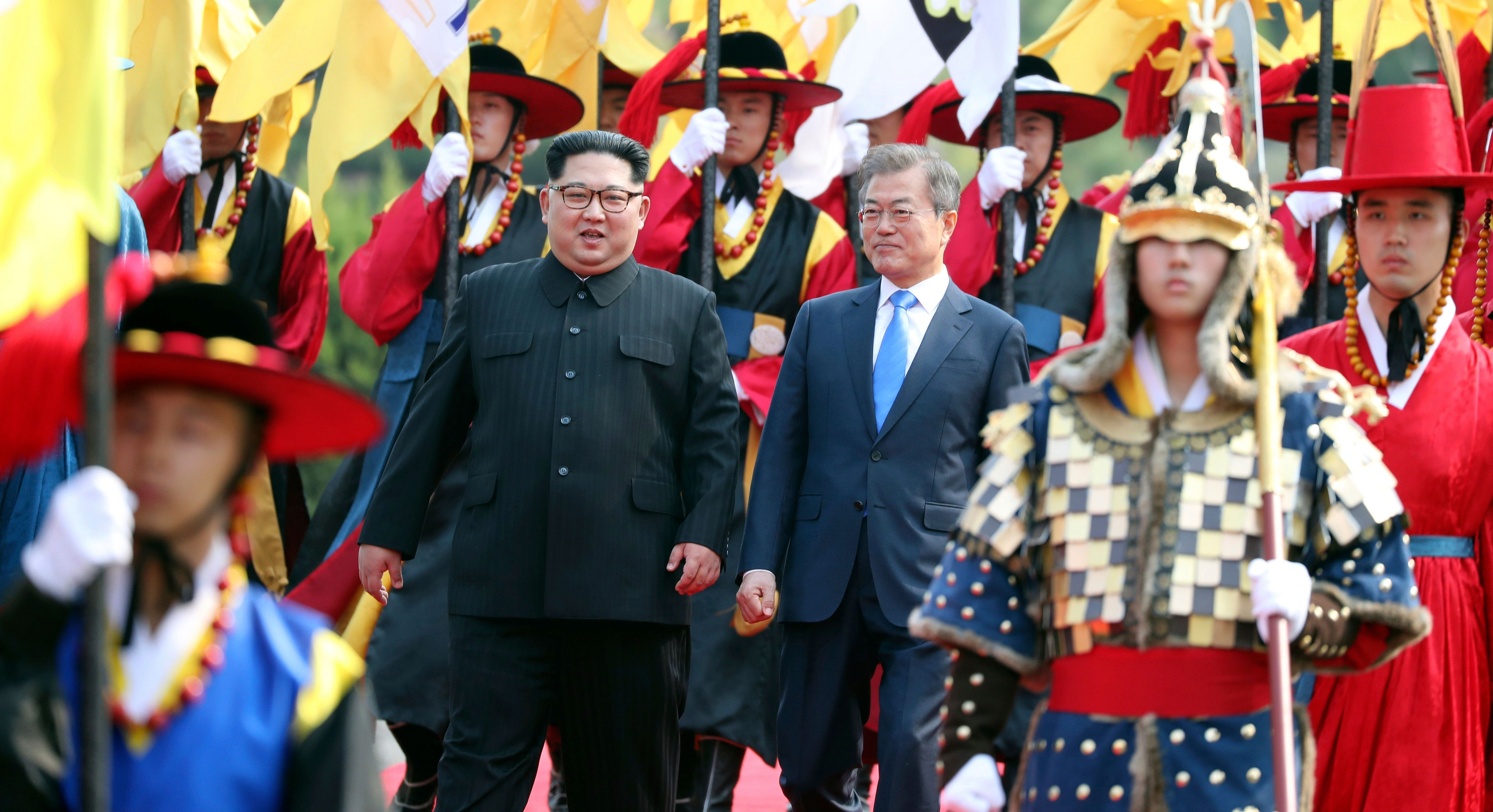
Review of the South Korean military traditional honor guard

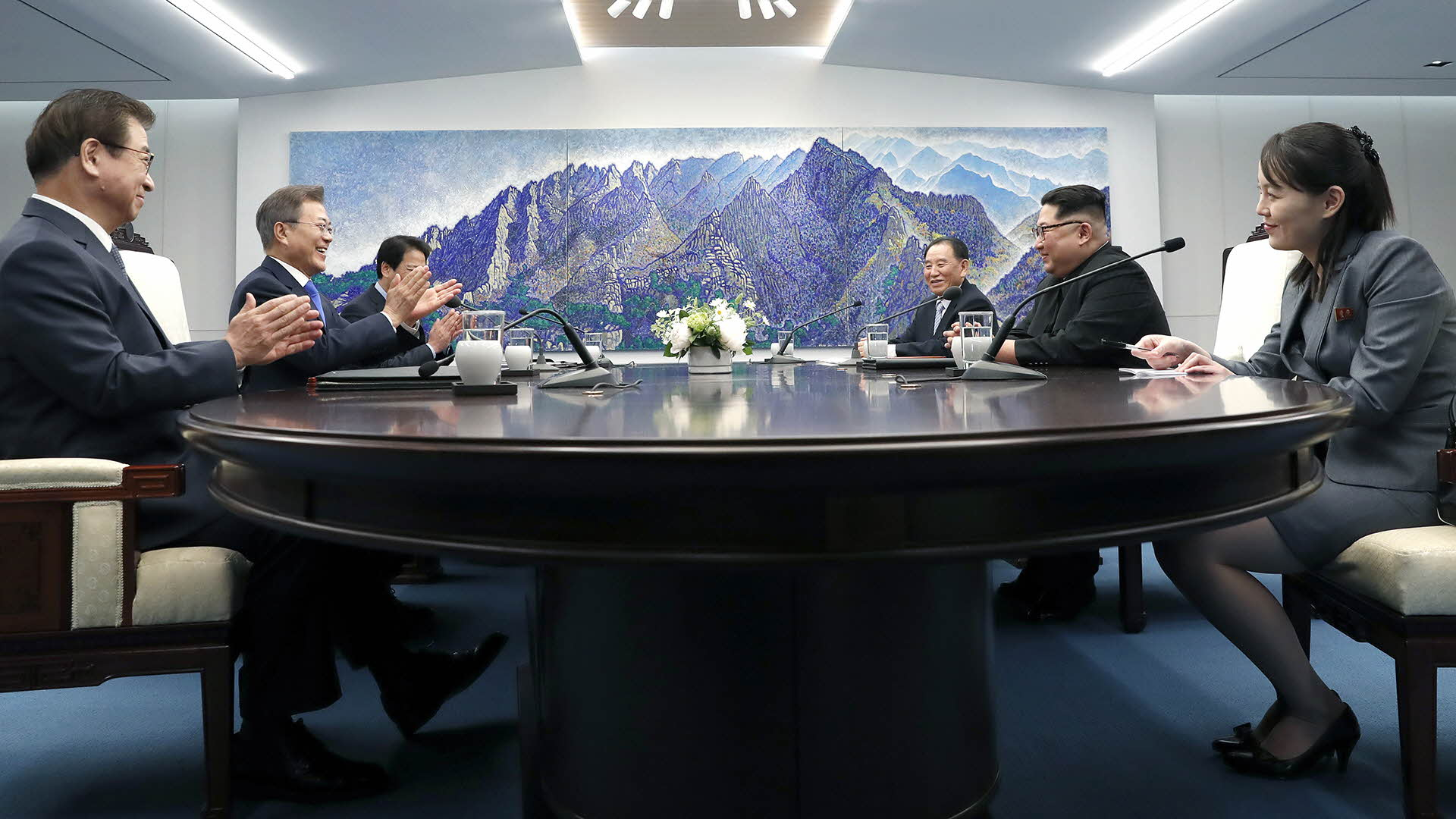
Talks inside the Peace House

== 2000 summit ==
In 2000, the representatives of the two governments met for the first time since the division of the Korean peninsula. Kim Dae-jung, the President of South Korea, who arrived at Pyongyang Sunan International Airport, met Kim Jong Il, Supreme Leader of North Korea, directly under the trap of the airport, and the rallies and divisions of the People's Army Corps were held.

- Participants: Kim Dae-jung, President of South Korea, and Kim Jong Il, Supreme Leader of North Korea
- Place of meeting: Pyongyang, North Korea
- Date of the meeting: June 13–15, 2000
- Results of talks: June 15th North–South Joint Declaration

== 2007 summit ==
In June 2007, a summit declaration was adopted, which included the realization of the June 15 Joint Declaration, the promotion of a three-party or four-party summit meeting to resolve the nuclear issue on the Korean peninsula, and active promotion of inter-Korean economic cooperation projects.

- Participants: Roh Moo-hyun, President of South Korea, and Kim Jong Il, Supreme Leader of North Korea
- Place of meeting: Pyongyang, North Korea
- Date of the meeting: October 2–4, 2007
- Results of talks: 2007 North–South Summit Declaration

== April 2018 summit ==
A summit was held on 27 April 2018 in South Korea's portion of the Joint Security Area. It was the third summit between South and North Korea, agreed by South Korea's president, Moon Jae-in, and North Korea's Supreme Leader, Kim Jong Un.

- Participants: Moon Jae-in, President of South Korea, and Kim Jong Un, Supreme Leader of North Korea
- Place of meeting: Joint Security Area, South Korea
- Date of the meeting: April 27, 2018
- Results of talks: Panmunjom Declaration

== May 2018 summit ==
On 26 May 2018, Kim and Moon met again in the Joint Security Area. The meeting took two hours, and unlike other summits it had not been publicly announced beforehand.

== September 2018 summit ==
On 13 August, Blue House announced that South Korea's president attended the third inter-Korean summit with leader Kim Jong Un in Pyongyang on 18–20 September. The agenda would be finding the strategy of the breakthrough in its hampered talks with U.S. and solution for the denuclearization on the Korean peninsula.

- Participants: Moon Jae-in, President of South Korea, and Kim Jong Un, Supreme Leader of North Korea
- Place of meeting: Pyongyang, North Korea
- Date of the meeting: September 18–20, 2018
- Results of talks: Pyongyang Joint Declaration of September 2018 along with a commitment for a future summit meeting in Seoul.

== See also ==
- 2018–19 Korean peace process
- Sunshine Policy
- Northern Limit Line
- Peace Treaty on Korean Peninsula
- 2018 North Korea–United States Singapore Summit
- 2019 North Korea–United States Hanoi Summit
- 2019 Koreas–United States DMZ Summit

== Press releases ==
- Two Koreas to hold summit (CNN, Aug 7, 2007)
- New hope of inter-Korean detente (UPI, Aug 10, 2007)
- Inter-Korean summit (chinaview, Aug 8, 2007)
- Korean summit postponed by floods (CNN, Aug 18, 2007)
