= Margaret Helen James =

English regional folklorist (1859–1938)

- Born: 1859; Suffolk, England
- Died: 9 December 1938 (aged 78–79)
- Occupations: Regional folklorist and indexer
- Notable work: Bogie Tales of East Anglia (1891)
- Relatives: Minnie James (sister); Montague Rhodes James (cousin)

Margaret Helen James (1859 – 9 December 1938) was an English regional folklorist and indexer. She published the book Bogie Tales of East Anglia (1891) under the name M. H. James. It was the first book devoted to the local folklore of East Anglia.

== Family ==
James was born in 1859 in Suffolk. Her father was Henry Haughton James (1827–1885), who had served in the Royal Indian Navy. She had a sister, Minnie James (1865–1903), who became the chief librarian in the East End of London. The sisters lived together at Torrington Square, Bloomsbury, London, in 1891.

Henry Haughton James was also the younger brother of Herbert James (1822–1909), Rector of Great Livermere and the father of the writer and scholar Montague Rhodes James (1862–1936), making Margaret Helen James and Montague Rhodes James first cousins.

== Career ==
In 1891, James published Bogie Tales of East Anglia, which collected folk stories from Norfolk and Suffolk and was the first book devoted to the folklore of East Anglia. She published the book under the name "M. H. James."

Bogie Tales of East Anglia covered witchcraft, ghosts, charms, traditional cures, legendary tales and an assortment of "terrifying" spectres. It outlined how "the black dog" or "the black shuck" was associated with the seaside town of Aldeburgh, Suffolk, and described him as a fierce and protective guard dog who will allow you to walk safely if you walk on his preferred pathway across the common. The book also recorded the story of Mother Chergrave the witch of Loddon, Norfolk, who made a pact with Satan, and her two biting imp familiars who she kept in an old carved wooden box. Another folk tale from the book was of the "Spectress of Spixworth Hall", a ghost who wore a jewelled wedding dress, carried a candle and was driven in a hearse, which dated to the 15th-century. James collected many of these folk tales from rural women.

Bogie Tales of East Anglia was republished in 2019 with a 15-page introduction by Francis Young. Her identity had been unconfirmed until 2017, when researchers Andrew Lohrum and Rosemary Pardoe discovered an obituary about her from 1939. The obituary revealed that she worked as a professional indexer for her cousin Montague Rhodes James, which corroborated with her occupation on census records. She also indexed works by Winston Churchill, Millicent Garrett Fawcett and Arthur Ruppin. She was a lifelong friend of Garrett Fawcett.

== Death ==
James died from pneumonia on 9 December 1938, aged 79.
