= People's Palace, Mile End =

Building in Mile End, London

People's Palace
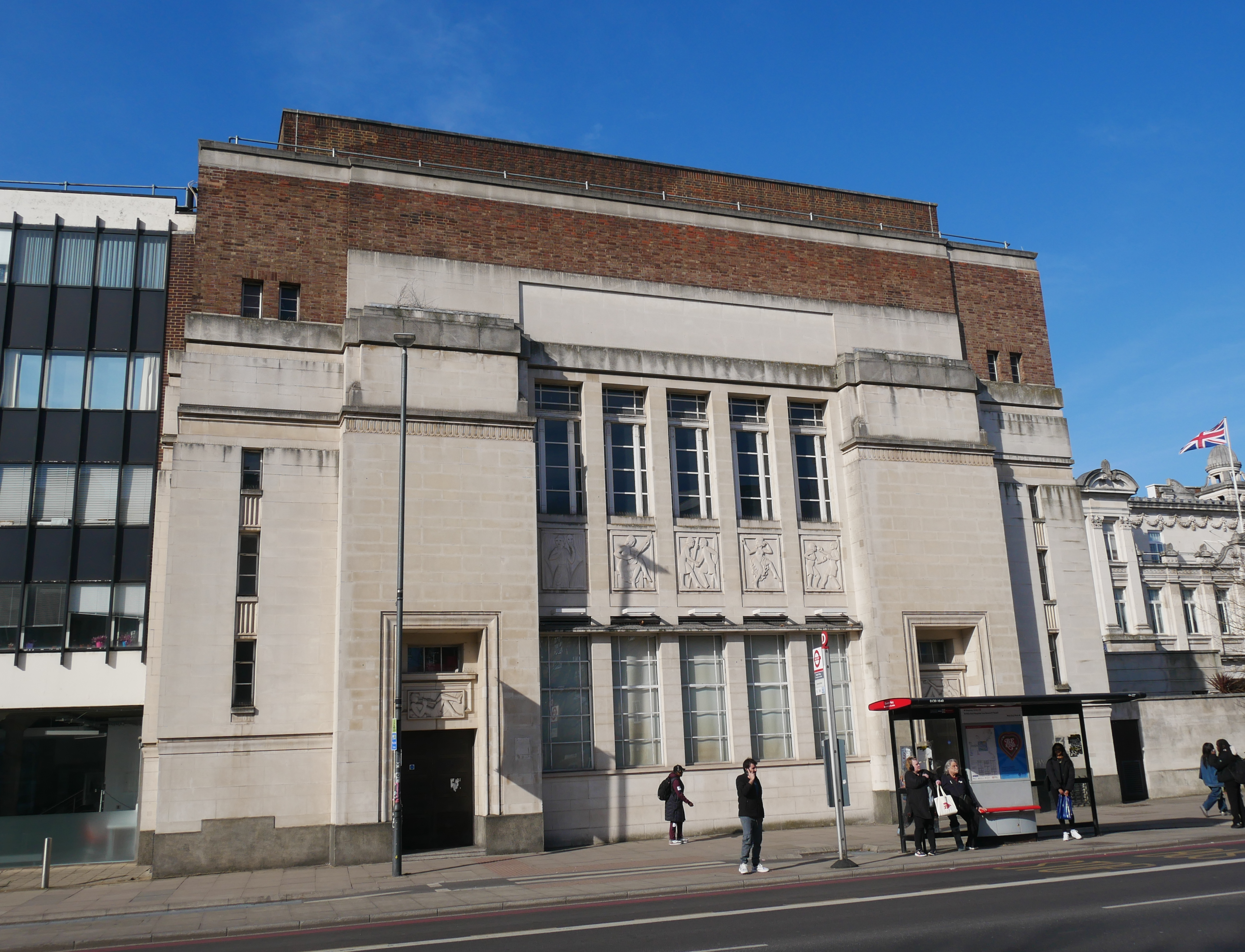
- The People's Palace in 2025

General information
- Architectural style: Art Deco
- Location: Mile End, London, England
- Coordinates: 51.5230°N 0.0412°W
- Opened: 13 February 1937

The People's Palace is a Grade II listed building in Mile End in the London Borough of Tower Hamlets. It is home to the Great Hall, a large theatre and entertainment venue, and is now part of Queen Mary University of London. It was the site of the first People's Palace (1887) which provided local people with a library, education and recreation.

== History ==
"The institution ... for the education and recreation of the residents of Whitechapel, East London. ... was the result of a visit from Walter Besant, the famous novelist, who was casting about in this portion of London in search of material for a new romance. A short time after his visit he produced a work of fiction called All Sorts and Conditions of Men (1882). The story is of a dream, in which a great "Palace of Delight" has been erected, where the lower classes gather for instruction and amusement ... ." The story inspired several philanthropists and charities to fund this fictional dream into reality.

The first People's Palace was built on the site of what is now the Queens' Building, and was officially opened on May 14, 1887 by the Queen with other dignitaries as a source of training and recreation. About 25,000 attended the grand opening along the route, including security, as the Queen toured in an open carriage through this poor district called "The City".

It was designed by Edward Robert Robson and it was heated by hot water and lit by gas. The octagonal library was based on the Prior's Kitchen of Durham Cathedral and it could hold 250,000 books. It boasted that it employed women librarians at the suggestion of Sir Edmund Hay Currie who was the chair of the trustees and Walter Besant. The first two women librarians were called Miss Black and Miss Low. There was an iron spiral staircase that allowed access to the galleries and books could be sent down on wires in brass fittings that could carry 112lb of books.

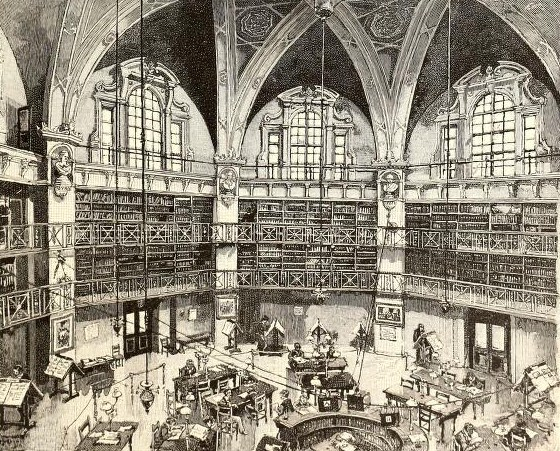
Reading Room at the People's Palace, 1890 magazine illustration.

In 1889 Minnie James became one of the first women to lead a major UK library. She understood her working class clientele and she introduced novels and opened the library on Sundays. She left in 1894 in protest at the poor funding. The library closed in 1901 for a few years.

It was destroyed by a fire in 1931, and a new People's Palace was built on the current site, immediately adjacent to the former. It was opened by King George VI on 13 February 1937, in what was his first public engagement as king.

The People's Palace was acquired by Queen Mary College in 1954.

== See also ==
- People's Palace, other organisations with the same name
