= Edward Robert Robson =

English architect

Edward Robert Robson FRIBA FSA FSI
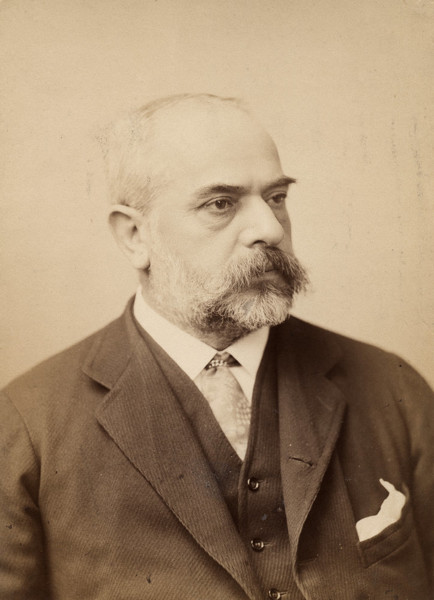
- Born: 2 March 1836; Durham, England
- Died: 19 January 1917 (aged 80); London, England
- Occupation: Architect
- Buildings: People's Palace, Mile End; Cheltenham Ladies' College; Jews' Free School

Edward Robert Robson FRIBA FSA FSI (2 March 1836 – 19 January 1917) was an English architect famous for the progressive spirit of his London state-funded school buildings of the 1870s and early 1880s.

== Life ==
Born in Durham, he was the elder son of Robert Robson, a Durham Justice of the Peace. He apprenticed in Newcastle upon Tyne with John Dobson, who worked in a classicising, Italianate manner; he then worked under Sir George Gilbert Scott (1854–59) during the restoration of Durham Cathedral's tower, taking a break in 1858 for "extensive Continental travel", and went on to serve as architect in charge of the Cathedral for six years. He was also in partnership for a time prior to 20 August 1862 with John Wilson Walton (c. 1822–1910). His first church, St. Cuthbert's, North Road, Durham (1863), was inspired in part by the plain 13th-century church at Formigny, Normandy. During (1865-71) he served as architect and surveyor to the city of Liverpool, which served to give him sufficient experience when he was the surprising choice as chief architect for the newly erected School Board of London, in 1871. He became a fellow of the Royal Institute of British Architects. Under the terms of the reforming Elementary Education Act 1870, a great number of new state-funded schools had to be built as quickly as possible, especially in the East End.

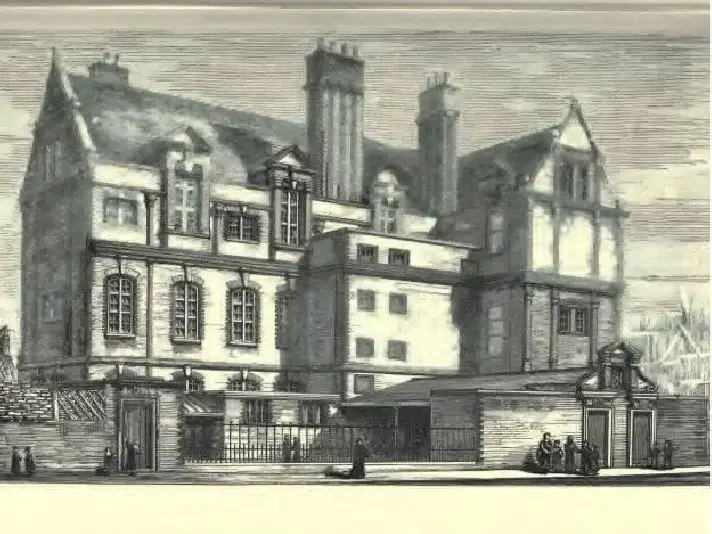
The Orange Street School building (where Elizabeth Burgwin introduced free school meals) from his 1874 book

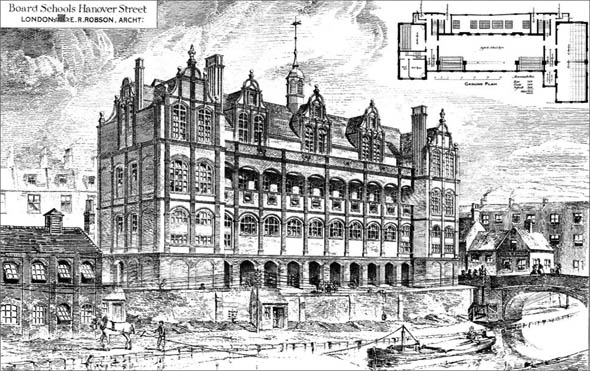
Board Schools, Hanover Street, London, by Edward Robert Robson.

Robson's experience, for which he travelled in the Continent for the most up-to-date school-planning ideas, was encapsulated in his School Architecture (1874). For the workload, he formed a partnership with J. J. Stevenson from 1871 until 1876. The schools themselves were of brick and architectural terracotta in the many-gabled free Anglo-Flemish Renaissance style known at the time as "Queen Anne style", which Robson chose as more suitably enlightened and secular than Gothic Revival and in which Stevenson had already shown himself proficient.

During his years with the School Board, Robson designed several hundred schools in London, and after leaving the Board in 1884 he remained as consulting architect to the Education Department.

His early connections with the Pre-Raphaelite Brotherhood may have made him an obvious choice in 1888 for remodelling some market buildings with great dispatch for the New Gallery, Regent Street, a venue for art of the Brotherhood and other progressive arts.

Robson also built the People's Palace, Mile End in 1886/7 as well as working on new school structures, notably Primrose Hill Infants' School and the Cheltenham Ladies' College (1896) and the Jews' Free School in Spitalfields (1904).

He is also credited with design of some residential houses. For example, Glenwood (99 Mycenae Road in Westcombe Park, London SE3) is described as "an impressive late-Victorian red brick mansion with half-timbered gable ends, and fine joinery detailing."

He married Marian, daughter of Henry Longden, of Sheffield, and Who's Who notes his recreations as "golf, bicycling, billiards". At the time of his death, he was a Fellow of the Royal Institute of British Architects, the Society of Antiquaries of London, and the Chartered Surveyors' Institution.

In his later years he worked with his son, Philip Appleby Robson. He was twice offered a knighthood, which he refused. He died in London.
