= 2000 inter-Korean summit =

Summit between the North and South Korean leaders

- 13–15 June 2000
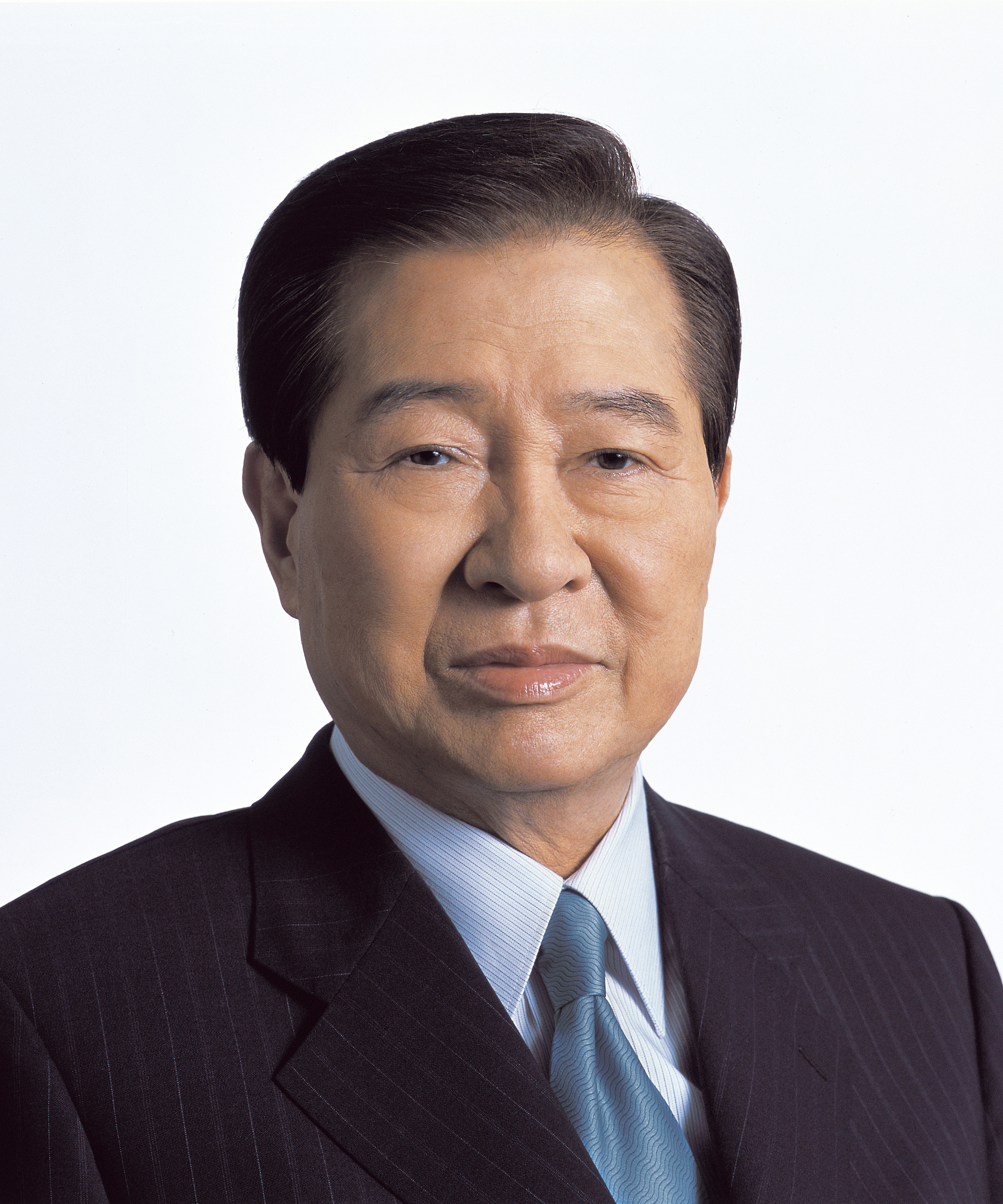
- South Korean president Kim Dae-jung (left) and North Korean supreme leader Kim Jong Il (right).
- Host country: North Korea
- Venues: Pyongyang
- Participants: (North Korea) Kim Jong Il (South Korea) Kim Dae-jung

The 2000 inter-Korean summit was a meeting between South Korean president Kim Dae-jung and North Korean leader Kim Jong Il, which took place in Pyongyang, North Korea from 13 to 15 June 2000. Following the summit, the two countries signed the June 15th North–South Joint Declaration, agreeing to resolve the issue of reunification independently, immediately address humanitarian concerns, and establish cooperative relations in all areas.

This meeting marked the first face-to-face dialogue between the leaders of North Korea and South Korea since the division of Korea. Besides successfully leading to the signing of the North–South Joint Declaration, the summit improved relations between the two countries, changed their perceptions of each other, and paved the way for future inter-Korean summits. Kim Dae-jung was subsequently awarded the Nobel Peace Prize the same year. The meeting became one of the most important events in South Korea. However, as time passed, South Korea developed different views on this meeting; North Korea, on the other hand, has always regarded it as a "historic" national event.

== Background ==
After the end of World War II, the Korean Peninsula, which was under Japanese rule, was placed under the administration of the Soviet Union and the United States. For strategic reasons, neither country wanted the peninsula to be controlled by the other, and they decided to establish two regimes with the 38th parallel as the boundary: North Korea, which was pro-Soviet, and South Korea, which was pro-American. Afterwards, North and South Korea emphasized that they were the only legitimate regimes on the Korean Peninsula and refused to recognize the existence of the other. North Korea launched the Korean War in 1950 in order to achieve unification. In 1953, the war ended in a stalemate. Both sides accused each other of being the culprits of starting the civil war, and the relationship became even worse. Until the 1970s, the relationship between the United States and the Soviet Union improved, and the tensions between North and South Korea was also eased. During this period, the July 4 South–North Joint Statement was formulated, and a joint team was formed to participate in the World Table Tennis Championships and various cultural exchange activities. In these 20 years, exchanges between the two countries have gradually increased.

In 1994, the United States accused North Korea of developing nuclear facilities in Yongbyon County and advocated sending aircraft carriers and warships to bomb them. South Korean President Kim Young-sam stressed that he would not support the United States’ actions, which led the United States to abandon its military action. Subsequently, Kim Young-sam expressed his intention to visit Pyongyang, which was agreed to by North Korean leader Kim Il Sung, and the schedule was set for 25 July of the same year. However, the talks were canceled on 8 July after Kim Il Sung suddenly passed away. In 1997, Kim Dae-jung won the South Korean presidential election. In his inaugural address the following year, he said that the Cold War model was not conducive to the relationship between North and South Korea, and that only reconciliation between the two sides could achieve peace and unification on the peninsula. To this end, Kim Dae-jung implemented the Sunshine Policy after taking office, advocating to eliminate distrust between the two sides through action and achieve genuine reconciliation. However, South Korea was in the midst of the Asian financial crisis at this time. Therefore, Kim Dae-jung had to deal with economic issues first.

As 2000 approached, South Korea’s economy improved, allowing Kim Dae-jung to focus on North Korean affairs. In his New Year’s address that year, he called for the establishment of a North-South economic community. A month later, he issued the Berlin Declaration at the Free University of Berlin, stating that he would provide financial assistance to Pyongyang to develop its economy and jointly develop infrastructure in order to achieve reconciliation between the two countries. Initially, North Korea was very wary of the declaration, believing that the Blue House was using economic aid as a pretext to overthrow the North Korean regime. However, as Kim Dae-jung repeatedly emphasized that the purpose of the aid program was only to help North Korea improve its economic level and that there was no other intention, Pyongyang’s position softened. Then, North Korea began to make contact with South Korea through unofficial channels and sent a special envoy to the Blue House to express its willingness to hold a summit meeting. Therefore, South Korean Minister of Culture and Tourism Park Jie-won and North Korean Vice Chairman of the Korea Asia-Pacific Peace Committee Song Ho-kyung held three informal meetings in Shanghai and Beijing from March to April 2000 as special envoys to prepare for the summit meeting. On 2 April, Kim Dae-jung said in an interview with Time magazine that dialogue was the way for North and South Korea to coexist peacefully, and said that he would "consider" holding a summit meeting between the leaders of North and South Korea after the National Assembly elections, but "needed the support of the people". On 8 April, Park and Song reached a consensus on the summit meeting and signed an agreement in Beijing. Two days later, Unification Minister Park Jae-kyu announced that Kim Dae-jung would visit Pyongyang from 12 to 14 June of the same year to hold talks with Kim Jong Il. On the same day, North Korea announced the news to the people on the front page of major newspapers, stating that the peaceful reunification of the peninsula is the greatest wish of the people and the legacy of the late President Kim Il Sung.

=== Preparations before the talks ===
On the eve of the announcement of the summit meeting at the Blue House, in order to build mutual trust, Major General Mike Dan of the ROK/US Combined Forces Command informed Lieutenant General Ri Chan-bok of the Korean People's Army in a private letter that the ROK-US joint military exercise would be held from 15 to 21 April, and emphasized that the exercise was only routine. After the announcement of the summit meeting, North and South Korea held five meetings at the Peace House and Unification Pavilion in Panmunjom from 22 April to 18 May to prepare for the summit meeting. They reached an agreement on 15 items, including the composition and size of the delegation, the form and topics of the talks, the dispatch of the advance team and transportation, and signed the North-South Working Procedure Agreement. In addition, Kim Dae-jung would not visit Mansudae, where a bronze statue of Kim Il Sung is placed, or the Juche Tower, which has political symbolism, during his visit; the flags of both sides will not be displayed at the meeting venues and the hotels where the delegations stay. Meanwhile, to ensure the smooth progress of the talks, North Korea entered a state of emergency in May and banned foreigners from entering the country throughout June; it also renovated Pyongyang Sunan International Airport, the main roads of the capital and the Paekhwawon State Guesthouse where the delegation stayed.

On the other hand, to create a friendly atmosphere, Pyongyang sent children's art troupes and variety troupes to Seoul to perform on 26 and 29 May. At the same time, North Korea cut off broadcasts criticizing the South Korean regime in the 38th parallel area and replaced them with traditional Korean music; the slogans were also changed to "Our people should not kill each other". On 30 May, the two countries agreed to carry a unified flag and appear together at the opening ceremony of the Sydney Summer Olympics, which will be held four months later. On the same day, South Korea sent a delegation of 30 people to Pyongyang via Panmunjom to make final preparations for the summit. This was the first time that South Korean officials had entered North Korea through Panmunjom since the high-level talks between North and South Korea in September 1992. In addition, Kim Jong Il also met with Chinese leader Jiang Zemin in Beijing at the same time to exchange views on the upcoming summit. This was the first visit by a North Korean leader to China in 13 years. Prior to the meeting, Japanese officials warned South Korean President Kim Dae-jung against touching on sensitive topics, such as ballistic missiles, since it may aggravate relations with the North and hinder opportunities for future meetings. On 5 June, the Blue House announced the list of personnel visiting North Korea. Among them, there were 10 official accompanying personnel.

- Prime Minister and Minister of Finance and Economy Lee Hun-jai
- Minister of Unification Park Jae-kyu
- Minister of Culture and Tourism Park Jie-won
- Chief of Staff of the President Han Kwang-ok
- Chief Secretary to the President Hwang Won-tak
- Presidential Chief Secretary and Spokesperson Park Jun-young
- Presidential Security Service Chief Ahn Ju-seop
- Presidential Chief Economic Secretary Lee Ki-ho
- Presidential Protocol Secretary Kim Ha-jung
- Presidential Physician Heo Gap-beom

In addition, the delegation included 24 special entourage members and 96 ordinary entourage members, totaling 130 people. Among them, the special entourage members came from political parties, business circles, cultural circles, academic circles and social figures with family members in North Korea. Then, the South Korean advance team conducted a field study in Pyongyang and successfully sent messages from there to Seoul.

== The summit ==
=== 13 June ===
On the evening of 10 June, North Korea made an emergency phone call, stating that it would postpone the summit by one day due to "technical relations". The Blue House then accepted the notification and called on the media not to speculate too much. As a result, Kim Dae-jung and his delegation postponed their departure by one day. On the morning of 13 June, before departing for Pyongyang, Kim Dae-jung addressed the nation, stating that he would visit North Korea "with the passion of loving the nation and the calm mind of reality", and hoped that the talks would open up a "path to peace" on the Korean Peninsula, eliminate the threat of war, and enable the 70 million people on the peninsula to live in peace. At the same time, he believed that the talks would not end with his return home, but would continue.

At 9 a.m., Kim Dae-jung, his wife Lee Hee-ho, and the rest of the delegation departed from Seongnam International Airport. Considering that there are no diplomatic relations between North and South Korea, Kim Dae-jung’s departure ceremony was kept simple in accordance with diplomatic protocol: there was no honor guard or foreign envoys to accompany him. Asiana Airlines was selected as the dedicated aircraft for this meeting. Based on the similarity between the airline’s Taegeuk symbol and the South Korean flag, in order to avoid misunderstanding and to comply with the agreement with North Korea not to display the national flag, the Taegeuk symbol near the tail of the dedicated aircraft was painted off. After arriving at Pyongyang Sunan International Airport, the national anthem was not played. In addition, although the distance between Seongnam Airport and Pyongyang Airport is only 160 kilometers, in order to avoid flying over the North Korean military demarcation line, the dedicated aircraft had to detour through the Yellow Sea, making the entire flight time more than an hour. However, as Kim Dae-jung flew to the North, it was still uncertain whether the meeting would go ahead. The editor of the Korea Herald reflected on the day, stating: "whether (North Korean leader) Kim Jong Il would show up or not at the airport was the talk of the town". 50 South Korean journalists accompanied Kim Dae-jung to the summit, while non-Korean journalists were prohibited from joining the South Korean President's delegation. A Chinese and a Russian news agency were the only non-Korean media in attendance. CNN, an American news network known for its favorable relationship with North Korea, was refused entry. Some of the South Korean journalists tried to leave the Koryo Hotel for an early morning stroll, but were informed that engaging in "personal contacts with Pyongyang citizens would depart from the spirit of the summit agreement".

At 10:30 a.m., Kim Dae-jung and his party arrived in Pyongyang and were greeted and shaken hands by Kim Jong Il. This was the first time he had personally received foreign guests since taking office. Then, Kim Dae-jung gave a speech to the North Korean people, saying that he thought he would never be able to set foot on the land of the North, but now he had "fulfilled his lifelong wish" and was therefore very happy. At the same time, he thanked Kim Jong Il for the welcome and hoped that the talks would "achieve reconciliation and cooperation". Kim was greeted with an elaborate welcome featuring a military band and women in traditional Korean dresses. Kim Dae-jung walked down the steps of the aircraft and towards the North Korean leader, and the two shook hands, each using both hands, while smiling. After the welcoming ceremony at the airport, Kim Jong Il and Kim Dae-jung drove to the city center of Pyongyang. During the journey, the two got out of the car and waved to the welcoming citizens. Finally, the motorcade arrived at the Paekhwawon State Guesthouse, and the whole process attracted 600,000 citizens to watch shaking bouquets of pink paper. After a short rest, North and South Korea held formal talks at the Paekhwawon State Guesthouse at 11:45 a.m. South Korea’s representatives included Kim Dae-jung, Unification Minister Park Jae-gyu, and Prime Minister and Minister of Finance and Economy Lee Heon-jae. North Korea ’s representatives were Kim Jong Il and Kim Yong-nam, Chairman of the Standing Committee of the Supreme People’s Assembly. The two countries reached an agreement to establish a direct telephone line so that the two leaders could resolve various issues through direct dialogue. Afterwards, Kim Dae-jung and his wife attended a welcome banquet held at the People’s Palace of Culture. Kim Yong-nam, who was in charge of the meeting, said he hoped that the talks would "liberate 70 million compatriots from the fear of war." Kim Dae-jung responded that the trip could transform the relationship of distrust and confrontation that had lasted for half a century into one of reconciliation and cooperation.

=== 14 June ===
Three different types of talks were held the day after the talks. At 9:45 a.m., North and South Korea held a large-scale meeting at the Mansudae Assembly Hall. The South Korean representatives were Kim Dae-jung and Park Jae-gyu, while North Korea sent Kim Yong-nam and Yang Hyong-seop, vice chairman of the Standing Committee of the Supreme People's Assembly. The two sides discussed the reunion of separated families and cooperation and exchanges in various aspects. On the other hand, Kim Dae-jung's wife, Lee Hee-ho, visited the Pyongyang Changgwang Kindergarten and the Embroidery Research Institute in the morning and talked with local children and women. Afterwards, Kim Dae-jung and his wife met and had lunch at the Okryu-gwan and watched a performance at the Mangyongdae Children's Palace. There. children played non-political yet patriotic tunes on the gayageum (a traditional Korean harp) for their South Korean guests.

At 3 p.m., Kim Jong Il and Kim Dae-jung met again at the Paekhwawon State Guesthouse, accompanied by Ri Ki-ho and Hwang Won-tak; Kim Yong-sun, chairman of the North Korean Asia-Pacific Peace Committee, also participated. The two sides ended their talks at 6:50 p.m., lasting nearly 4 hours. The two countries finally exchanged views on four topics: methods to ease tensions on the peninsula, reunion of separated families, and exchanges and cooperation in economic, social and cultural aspects, and finally reached a consensus and signed the Agreement on the Prevention of Double Taxation and the Agreement on Investment Protection. On the other hand, 24 special entourage members from South Korea met with North Korean officials at the Mansudae Assembly Hall for special talks on economic, women's, social and academic aspects. At the same time, Ri Hee-ho visited the Pyongyang Maternity Hospital and a handicraft company. In the evening, Kim Dae-jung held a thank-you dinner at the Mokran Hall, which Kim Jong Il attended at the invitation. Kim Dae-jung delivered a speech at the banquet, stating that the talks had been successfully held and that "the bright future of the nation is now before us". Therefore, he suggested that North and South Korea should cooperate sincerely to "move towards prosperity together". At the same time, he invited Kim Jong Il and others to visit Seoul. In his reply, Kim Yong-nam stated that the talks "repeatedly confirmed" that the two countries are inseparable flesh and blood.

After the dinner, Kim Jong Il and Kim Dae-jung announced at 11:20 that they would sign the North-South Joint Declaration, which would be signed and published at midnight. Therefore, the signing date of the declaration was 15 June. According to the declaration, the two countries agreed:

1. Both the North and the South agreed to resolve the issue of national reunification independently through the joint efforts of the entire nation.
2. Regarding the unification of North and South, the Southern federal government's proposal and the Northern loose coalition government's vision share common elements. Both sides agree to promote unification in this direction.
3. Both sides agreed to resolve humanitarian issues immediately, such as the reunion of separated families on Liberation Day, 15 August, and the issue of imprisoned communists in the South.
4. Both sides agreed to enhance mutual trust by developing mutually beneficial economic cooperation and people-to-people exchanges and cooperation in areas such as civil society, culture, sports, healthcare, environmental protection, and others.
5. Both North and South Korea agreed to hold relevant dialogues in the near future to achieve the above agreement.

According to Kim Dae-jung's later explanation, the declaration was originally scheduled to be signed and announced at 9 p.m. that day, but was postponed due to the dinner.

=== 15 June ===
The day's itinerary included attending a farewell luncheon. The luncheon was held at 12:20 p.m. at the Paekhwawon State Guesthouse, and was attended by Kim Jong Il, Kim Dae-jung, and members of the North and South Korean delegations. Jo Myong-rok, Director of the General Political Bureau of the Korean People's Army, and Lim Dong-won, Director of the National Intelligence Service of South Korea, delivered speeches and proposed a toast. Kim Jong Il and Kim Dae-jung then clinked glasses with each other. Following this, the attendees responded to Park Ji-won's suggestion and sang the song "Our Wish is Unification". At 4:20 p.m., Kim Dae-jung and the South Korean delegation flew back to South Korea, where they were personally seen off by Kim Jong Il, concluding the three-day summit.

=== Peace declaration (eight-point agreement) ===
1. South and North Korea are to implement the June 15 Joint Declaration
2. South and North Korea are to work for mutual respect and trust in order to overcome differences in ideology, system.
3. South and North Korea are to ease military tensions, hold defense ministerial talks in November in Pyongyang to discuss ways of supporting inter-Korean economic cooperation and easing tension.
4. The two sides agree on the need to end the current armistice and establish permanent peace.
5. The two sides are to create a special peace zone around Haeju in North Korea and nearby areas.
6. South and North Korea are to develop cooperation in the history, language, education, technology, culture, sports, and social sectors.
7. South and North Korea are to actively push for humanitarian cooperation and expansion of the reunions of separated families.
8. South and North Korea are to strengthen cooperation for national interest in the international stage and the benefits of Korean residents abroad.

== Aftermath and impact ==
The summit meeting promoted relations between North and South Korea. In order to implement the North-South Joint Declaration, the Kim Dae-jung government held 60 bilateral meetings with North Korea before leaving office in February 2003, including 13 general-level military talks, 17 military field meetings, 21 meetings on economic issues and 9 social cooperation meetings. In August 2000, in response to the agreement of the summit meeting, the two countries held a two-day reunion event for separated families in Seoul. Subsequently, the North Korean National Symphony Orchestra visited South Korea and held a joint concert with the KBS Symphony Orchestra. This was the second time that musicians from both countries had performed together since the "Yun Isan Unification Concert" in 1998. On 2 September, the Blue House repatriated 63 non-retrograde prisoners who had been captured during the Korean War and refused to give up their political stance to North Korea. On 15 September, the two countries marched together with a unified flag at the opening ceremony of the Sydney Olympics. Afterwards, the two countries held several official talks. From 25 to 26 September, the two sides agreed at the defense ministers’ meeting to work toward easing tensions on the Korean Peninsula. The ministerial meeting from 27 to 30 September led to the establishment of the "North-South Economic Cooperation Promotion Committee". On 28 November, the North-South working-level military meeting discussed the reconnection of the two countries’ railways and highways. The North-South ministerial meeting from 12 to 16 December reached a consensus on sending an economic observation mission. On 31 January 2001, the two countries agreed at the North-South Red Cross meeting to hold another reunion of separated families and allow separated families to exchange letters. Since then, until Kim Dae-jung left office, the two countries held six reunion events for separated families. In addition, the two countries also agreed to clear landmines in the demilitarized zone and establish a reunion center for separated families during this period. Meanwhile, the KBS Symphony Orchestra visited Pyongyang from 16 to 22 September, 2002, and performed with the North Korean National Symphony Orchestra. On 29 September, North Korea sent a delegation of 184 people to participate in the Busan Asian Games in 2002, and entered the opening ceremony with the host South Korea carrying the unification flag. On 26 October, Pyongyang sent an 18-person economic observation team to South Korea for inspection.

On the other hand, the summit changed South Koreans’ perception of North Korea and its leader Kim Jong Il. Before the summit, most South Koreans thought North Korea was a completely uncivilized country, and Kim Jong Il was unable to speak due to a stroke. As the summit progressed, South Koreans gradually became interested in North Korea, and various North Korean foods and goods became popular. Universities began to offer courses on the country. At the same time, South Korean television broadcast many scenes of Pyongyang during the live broadcast of the summit, which made South Koreans re-understand the city. North Korea’s non-interference in the reports and filming by South Korean television also changed South Koreans’ perception of North Korea. On the other hand, Kim Jong Il’s humorous remarks and respect for Kim Dae-jung during the summit won the favor of South Koreans. During this period, South Koreans set up fan clubs and dedicated websites for him. In Seoul, some citizens even wore clothes with his image printed on them. The Korea Broadcasting Promotion Agency conducted telephone interviews with 650 adult citizens across the country, and the results showed that the public’s positive evaluation of Kim Jong Il increased significantly. In terms of leadership ability, the positive evaluation rose sharply from 20.2% before the talks to 53.7%; in terms of credibility, the positive evaluation rose sharply from 15.1% to 51.2%. A survey conducted by The Dong-A Ilbo found that before the talks, only 4.7% of respondents felt "good" about Kim Jong Il, but after the talks, this figure rose to 53.8%. At the same time, 97.3% of people said they welcomed Kim Jong Il’s visit to Seoul, up from 81.9% before the talks. For North Korea, the summit also changed their stance on South Korea. Previously, Pyongyang would refer to the Blue House as a "puppet regime of the United States" and its president as a lackey of the United States. However, after the talks, the North Korean government changed the names of the two to "South Korean regime" and "South Korean president".

Kim Dae-jung also benefited from the summit. Every year, Gallup Korea conducts quarterly polls on the president’s performance of his duties. In the second quarter before the summit, 38% of the public had a positive opinion of Kim Dae-jung and 26% had a negative opinion. However, in the third quarter after the summit, the positive opinion jumped to 54% and the negative opinion dropped to 18%, the fastest drop in the negative opinion since the poll was established. Subsequently, in recognition of Kim Dae-jung’s contribution to facilitating the summit and achieving "reconciliation between North and South Korea," the Nobel Committee awarded him the Nobel Peace Prize on 13 October 2000, making him the first South Korean to receive this honor. Kim Dae-jung died of pneumonia on 13 July 2009. In consideration of his contributions to the country during his lifetime, the Blue House decided to hold a state funeral for him, which is the first time South Korea has held a state funeral since Park Chung Hee was assassinated in 1979. Pyongyang sent a delegation of mourners, headed by Kim Ki-nam, secretary of the Central Committee of the Workers' Party of Korea, to Seoul to attend the funeral and wrote on the list of honorees: "We mourn the justice and conscience of former President Kim Dae-jung and the indelible mark he left on the nation."

== Reports and interviews ==
The Koryo Hotel in North Korea and the Lotte Hotel in Seoul served as the press centers for the talks, and news was transmitted from the Koryo Hotel to the Lotte Hotel. Given that North Korea restricted South Korea to sending only 50 journalists to Pyongyang for interviews and did not welcome journalists from third countries, journalists from major media outlets around the world flocked to the press center of the Lotte Hotel in Seoul. In the end, the summit attracted 622 journalists from 113 South Korean media outlets and more than 490 journalists from 163 overseas media outlets. Among the 50 South Korean journalists in Pyongyang, they came from various newspapers, news agencies and television stations. These journalists would conduct joint interviews under the name of the "summit interview team" and were not allowed to send transcripts, videos and pictures privately. All articles would be sent to Seoul under the name of the "joint interview team".

In South Korea, the summit was broadcast live by three television stations : KBS 1, MBC and SBS. North Korea’s decision to postpone the summit by one day caught the television stations, which originally planned to broadcast it on the 12th, off guard. They filled the program by showing North Korean films such as Hong Gil-dong. In North Korea, neither the state media, the Korean Central Television and the Rodong Sinmun, reported that the summit would be postponed by one day, leaving some Pyongyang citizens who planned to come to welcome Kim Dae-jung disappointed. On the 13th, the Korean Central News Agency reported that "the South Korean delegation has arrived in Pyongyang for the historic inter-Korean summit. Comrade Kim Jong Il welcomed President Kim Dae-jung at the airport" and commented: "This summit is a historic opportunity to put national reconciliation and unity, exchange and cooperation, peace and unification before us. It is a major event to realize the cause of unification through the efforts of the national subject and to demonstrate the firm will of the nation." The Korean Central Broadcasting Station and Pyongyang Broadcasting Station first reported the news of Kim Dae-jung's visit to Pyongyang in their news broadcasts at 5 p.m., and the Korean Central Television also began broadcasting the news at 7 p.m. that day.

The following day, North Korea gave extensive coverage to the talks. The Rodong Sinmun devoted six out of eight pages to the detailed report. The cover featured a large picture of Kim Jong Il welcoming President Kim Dae-jung at the airport, with the headline "Southern Delegation Arrives in Pyongyang." That morning, the Central Television informed the nation that Kim Dae-jung was holding talks with Kim Yong-nam. The talks were repeatedly shown in the special news at 5 p.m. and 7 p.m., and Kim Dae-jung's speech was broadcast in the news report at 8 p.m. Then, until 17 June, the Rodong Sinmun continued to report on the talks on its cover, after which the coverage was reduced. On the other hand, North Korean propaganda agencies reported on the sudden goodwill of South Koreans toward Kim Jong Il, telling the people that Kim Jong Il had won the hearts of the South Korean people: children were vying to imitate his words and actions during the talks, female college students were happily waving his photos, and people were reading his works.

== Reactions ==
After the summit, Kim Dae-jung called it "the biggest event in our history". He said that the talks would bring a "new day" to the Korean Peninsula, putting an end to 55 years of division and hostility on the peninsula and bringing a turning point in the nation’s history. Kim Jong-pil, president of the ruling coalition of the United Liberal Democrats, considered the talks "historic" and said that the party should change its hardline stance toward North Korea. However, the Grand National Party criticized Kim Dae-jung for not mentioning the nuclear issue in the talks, saying it was "unacceptable." Nevertheless, the South Korean people were generally satisfied with the results of the talks. The JoongAng Ilbo conducted a telephone survey of 1,100 people nationwide after the talks, and the results showed that 97.4% of people thought the talks were "successful." A poll conducted by the Korea Daily also showed that 95.7% of people were satisfied with the results of the talks. The mainstream media were all satisfied with the results of the talks. The Chosun Ilbo compared the talks to Nixon’s visit to China in 1972 and hoped that "the seeds of reconciliation and peace will be sown". The weekly magazine "Nation 21" believed that the talks "generated a huge shock and moved people". North Korea also gave high praise to the talks. The Korean Foreign Languages Publishing House called the talks "unprecedented" and "a major event that opened up a turning point in the cause of national reunification". The Rodong Sinmun described the joint declaration as a document of "independence, peaceful reunification and national unity". However, the South Korean Government paid North Korea approximately US$500 million to attend the Summit. This payment was kept secret at the time and only emerged three years later, causing a major political scandal called the Cash-for-summit scandal. It was later discovered that South Korea had secretly paid the North Korean Government $200 million to attend, and because of this issue 6 South Korean businessmen and officials were convicted.

The countries also welcomed the results of the summit. US President Bill Clinton called the talks "very successful" and said that the signing of the North-South Joint Declaration was "the first step toward cooperation". Japanese Foreign Minister Yohei Kono said that the two leaders had gained the trust of the people and believed that the results of the talks would definitely be concrete. Zhu Bangzao, spokesperson for the Ministry of Foreign Affairs of the People’s Republic of China, believed that the talks would "make a great contribution" to peace and stability on the Korean Peninsula. The Russian Ministry of Foreign Affairs issued a statement saying that it was "very satisfied" with the results of the talks and praised the "sincere and goodwill" of North and South Korea in resolving the issue "with their own strength". UN Secretary-General Kofi Annan’s statement expressed his respect for Kim Dae-jung and Kim Jong Il, who held the talks, and believed that the concrete results of the talks would bring peace and stability to the Korean Peninsula and the surrounding region.

Meanwhile, the media gave the talks a positive review. The BBC News described the talks as a step toward unification between North and South Korea. The New York Times praised the two leaders for their boldness, saying that Kim Dae-jung had restored dialogue between North and South Korea, which would be a major change in the modern history of South Korea; while Kim Jong Il "showed his attitude and got out of hiding". The Asahi Shimbun believed that North and South Korea would move toward reconciliation and trust, which would have a major impact on the situation in Northeast Asia, such as the relationship between Japan and North Korea, and between the United States and North Korea. The talks were also selected as one of the top ten news stories of the year. The Hankyoreh ranked it as the top domestic news story of 2000. The Dong-A Ilbo ranked it as the second biggest domestic news story of the year. In addition, the Associated Press ranked the talks as the fifth of the top ten world news stories of the year. The Yomiuri Shimbun also ranked it as the third of the top ten global news stories.

On the eve of the 2007 inter-Korean summit, South Korea re-evaluated the 2000 summit. The JoongAng Ilbo pointed out that at the time of the first summit, the people were full of hope for the improvement of inter-Korean relations. However, apart from some progress in economic cooperation, there was no fundamental change in inter-Korean reconciliation. The Chosun Ilbo also criticized the North-South Joint Declaration for becoming a political propaganda tool of Pyongyang. However, Lee Hwa-young, a member of the Open National Party, believed that the 2000 summit, "taking reconciliation and cooperation as an opportunity," had "declaration significance." In 2018, before the first summit between South Korean President Moon Jae-in and North Korean leader Kim Jong-un, the 2000 summit was brought up again. This time, the Digital Times pointed out that the North-South Joint Declaration did expand inter-Korean exchanges and cooperation, but the failure to make the summit regular was a limitation. The Democratic Peace Party argues that the talks were "history of us forging our own destiny". In North Korea, the 2000 talks and joint declarations have been highly valued by the Workers' Party of Korea. In a joint New Year’s commentary in 2007, the joint declaration was described as "hope to open the path to our nation’s prosperity". In 2018, the Anti-Imperialist National Democratic Front, a branch of the Workers' Party, declared that the declaration was "opening a gap in the history of 55 years of confrontation and hostility".

== See also ==
- Sunshine Policy
- Northern Limit Line
- Inter-Korean summit
- 2007 inter-Korean summit

== Press releases ==
- Two Koreas to hold summit (CNN, Aug 7, 2007)
- New hope of inter-Korean detente (UPI, Aug 10, 2007)
- Inter-Korean summit (chinaview, Aug 8, 2007)
- Korean summit postponed by floods (CNN, Aug 18, 2007)
