= 2007 North–South Summit Declaration =

- Hangul: 2007 남북 공동선언
- Hanja: 2007 南北 共同宣言
- RR: 2007 nambuk gongdongseoneon
- MR: 2007 nambuk kongdongsŏnŏn

North Korean name
- Hangul: 2007 북남 공동선언
- Hanja: 2007 北南 共同宣言
- RR: 2007 bungnam gongdongseoneon
- MR: 2007 pungnam kongdongsŏnŏn

The 2007 North–South Summit Declaration is the declaration for the development of inter-Korean relations and peace and prosperity. It is the declaration agreed upon between South Korea's 16th president Roh Moo-hyun and North Korea's representative Kim Jong Il at the 2007 inter-Korean summit. It is often called the 10.4 South-North Summit Declaration or the 2007 North–South Summit Declaration, and it is also referred to as the 10.4 Declaration. On October 4, 2007, at 1 pm, the North and South Korean leaders signed jointly at the Paekhwawon State Guesthouse, Pyongyang.

== Summary ==
1. The South and the North shall uphold and endeavor actively to realize the June 15 Declaration. The South and the North have agreed to resolve the issue of unification on their own initiative and according to the spirit of "by-the-Korean-people-themselves." The South and the North will work out ways to commemorate the June 15 anniversary of the announcement of the South-North Joint Declaration to reflect the common will to faithfully carry it out.

2. The South and the North have agreed to firmly transform inter-Korean relations into ties of mutual respect and trust, transcending the differences in ideology and systems. The South and the North have agreed not to interfere in the internal affairs of the other and agreed to resolve inter-Korean issues in the spirit of reconciliation, cooperation and reunification.

3. The South and the North have agreed to closely work together to put an end to military hostilities, mitigate tensions and guarantee peace on the Korean Peninsula. The South and the North have agreed not to antagonize each other, reduce military tension, and resolve issues in dispute through dialogue and negotiation.

4. The South and the North both recognize the need to end the current armistice regime and build a permanent peace regime. The South and the North have also agreed to work together to advance the matter of having the leaders of the three or four parties directly concerned to convene on the Peninsula and declare an end to the war.

5. The South and the North have agreed to facilitate, expand, and further develop inter-Korean economic cooperation projects on a continual basis for balanced economic development and co-prosperity on the Korean Peninsula in accordance with the principles of common interests, co-prosperity and mutual aid.

== See also ==
- Sunshine policy
- Inter-Korean summit 2007 summit
- Unconverted long-term prisoners, communists imprisoned by South Korea
- Ten Point Programme for Reunification of the Country
