= People's Palace of Culture =

Palace and theater in Pyongyang, North Korea

Coordinates: 39.0254°N 125.7384°E

- 인민문화궁전
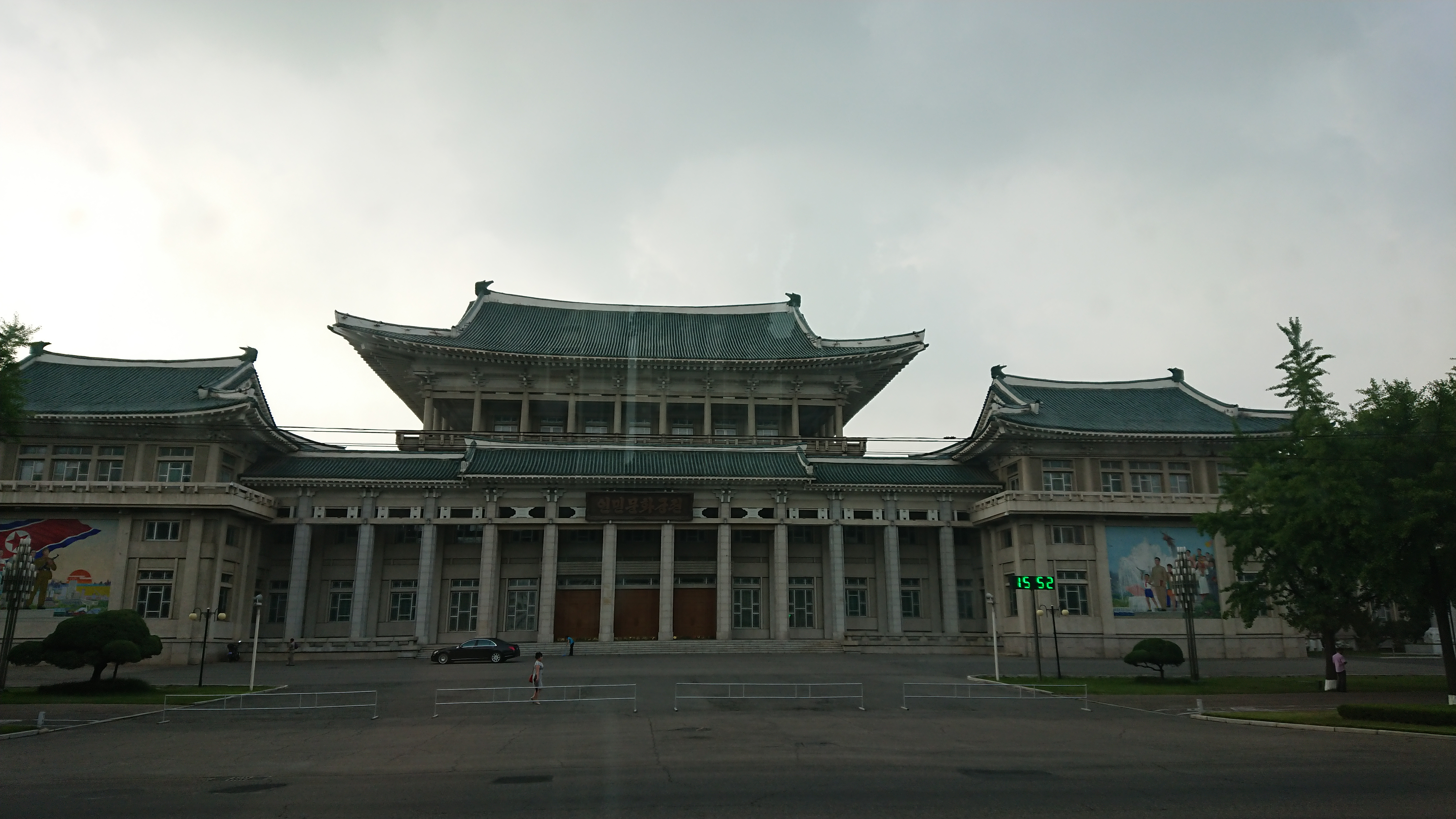
- Interactive map of People's Palace of Culture
- Location: Chollima Street, Central District Pyongyang, North Korea

Construction
- Opened: April 1974

- People's Palace of Culture
- Hangul: 인민문화궁전
- Hanja: 人民文化宮殿
- RR: Inmin munhwa gungjeon
- MR: Inmin munhwa kungjŏn

The People's Palace of Culture (Korean: 인민문화궁전) is a palace and theater located in Pyongyang, North Korea. Construction of the building finished in January 1974 and was opened to the public in April 1974. South Korean President Kim Dae-jung was given a welcome ceremony at the People's Palace of Culture during the 2000 inter-Korean summit.

The building is four stories tall and has a basement floor as well.

== See also ==
- List of theatres in North Korea
