= NIS illegal wiretapping scandal =

2002 political scandal in South Korea

The National Intelligence Service of the Republic of Korea’s illegal eavesdropping case occurred during the Kim Dae-Jung administration when the National Intelligence Service was wiretapping civilians and the opposite political party’s politicians. It was revealed by the Grand National Party lawmaker Chung Hyung-Geun in October 2002, and was considered an election disclosure ahead of the presidential election; however, three years of the investigation confirmed that the allegation of NIS wiretapping was true. In December 2000, during the so-called 'Kwon No-gap's resignation scandal', the phone conversations of young Democratic Party lawmakers and those involved in Jin Seung-Hyun's gate were wiretapped. At the time of Choi Kyu-sun's gate in 2000, it was confirmed that Choi Kyu-sun's business operations, money and women relations, and the details of personnel appointments of high-ranking officials such as the NIS director were also wiretapped.

It has been also confirmed that a phone call by ULD lawmaker Lee regarding Hwang Jang-Yup's visit to the U.S. in 2001 and the dismissal of Unification Minister Lim Dong-won in the same year were also wiretapped. In April 2001, a telephone conversation between Kim Yoon-hwan of the Democratic People's Party and Kim Yoon-Hwan of the Democratic Party was also wiretapped. The contents of the NIS's call to the Provincial Police Agency between 1998 and 2002 were compiled into several A4 paper reports. The reports were reported to the directors through the deputy director of the National Intelligence Service.

In April 2005, prosecutors concluded that documents released by Rep. Chung Hyung-Geun of the Grand National Party in 2002 as wiretapping details of the NIS cannot be regarded as documents made by the NIS due to different forms and texts. However, after the prosecution's reinvestigation into the Mirim team and Samsung's X-file scandal that year, the National Intelligence Service's wiretapping was confirmed to be true. Soon after, the board members of the National Intelligence Service and Kim-Eun Seong, the Second Conductor were arrested. Because there were concealment instructions and additional suspicion, the director and other related people were punished.

== Background ==
In September and October 2002, Rep. Chung Hyung-Keun raised suspicions of illegal wiretapping by the NIS through the standing committee and the parliamentary audit. In December, additional revelations by Lee Bu-young, vice chairman of the GNP's election committee, were exposed. In October 2002, the alleged wiretapping of the National Intelligence Service, which was raised by Rep. Chung Hyung-Geun of the Grand National Party, was amplified by media reports, which later turned into political issues. However, there was no specific evidence, so it remained a suspicion. It was revealed in 2005 after the Mirim team investigation.

During the 2002 South Korean presidential election, Chung Hyung-Geun obtained a copy of the documents confirming that the NIS was wiretapping some opposing party's politicians in the summer of 2002. In September and October of that year, Chung Hyung-Geun announced the rest of the documents to the National Assembly.

In March 2005, the South Korean prosecution was also reportedly planning to clear the NIS's alleged wiretapping of mobile phones, which Rep. Chung Hyung-Keun revealed. However, in July of that year, the secret inspection of the Mirim Team was revealed by Kim Ki-sam and Gong Eun-Yeong and others, and the investigation began again.

== National Assemblyman Chung Hyung-Keun's disclosure ==
In October 2002, Chung Hyung-Keun of the Grand National Party released 25 pages of A4 paper, saying, "It contains details of wiretapping by the National Intelligence Service," which sparked a series of accusations and solidarity of participation between the ruling and opposition parties.

The accusation spread after failing to prove the charges in detail other than the documents. The case, which was raised through the National Assemblyman Chung Hyung-Keun's revelation, became an issue as media reports such as "the National Intelligence Service is securing mobile phone wiretapping equipment," followed by complaints and accusations. At that time, the People's Solidarity for Participatory Democracy filed a complaint with the NIS, the Grand National Party lawmakers filed a complaint against the NIS chief at the time, and the NIS staff accused the GNP lawmakers of defamation.

Six complaints were filed by Rep. Chung Hyung-Keun of the Grand National Party regarding the alleged wiretapping of the National Intelligence Service's mobile phone. The prosecution concluded the accusation case by deciding that it was innocent and not guilty. The Seoul Central District Prosecutors' Office said on 1 April, "The investigation so far has not confirmed that the NIS has illegally wiretapped the police department of public security at the Seoul Central District Prosecutors' Office. Accordingly, the prosecution cleared all six accusations and accusations filed after disclosing 25 pages of A4 paper submitted by Rep. Chung Hyung-Keun of the 2 Grand National Party.

=== The prosecution's acquittal ===
In April 2005, prosecutors claimed that cell phone wiretapping was impossible. They said that the NIS can't collect information by conducting massive mobile phone wiretapping every minute, just like the alleged wiretapping of the National Intelligence Service.

"It's impossible to wiretap a cell phone unless you follow someone who wants to wiretap while moving the entire base station."

The prosecution explained the reason why wiretapping mobile phones are "theoretically possible but practically impossible." According to a survey conducted by experts and university professors at each telecommunications company, cell phone call voice data can be coded and tapped within 250 meters, but it is not realistic to have such equipment within a few hundred meters. A prosecution official said, "Even if it was within a 250-meter radius, not all of them could be wiretapped, and technically only a part of the radius can be wiretapped."

The prosecution also concluded that some claims that wiretapping is possible with a cloned cell phone during the interview on 1 April 2005, were groundless. According to the prosecution's experiment with the experts, when one cell phone was opened when the phone was called, the other cell phone turned off and the contents of the call were not heard. Prosecutors also said they had asked CCS about allegations that the U.S. CCS developed and sold mobile phone wiretapping devices in Korea through the U.S. Justice Department and judicial cooperation. The prosecution conducted various experiments on the possibility of mobile phone wiretapping but failed to reveal the source of the "National Intelligence Service wiretapping document" revealed by Rep. Chung Hyung-Keun.

The data still contains highly reliable information, especially Hanwha's alleged acquisition of Korea Life Insurance, which still raises questions about the source, but Chung, a reference, did not cooperate with the investigation, and no progress was made. The prosecution applied to the court for a pre-trial witness interrogation of lawmaker Chung but only fined him ₩500,000 (won) through the court for failing to attend.

== NIS wiretapping activities ==
In December 2000, during the so-called 'Kwon No-gap's resignation scandal', phone conversations of young Democratic Party lawmakers and those involved in Jin Seung-hyun's gate were wiretapped. At the time of Choi Kyu-sun's gate in 2000, it was confirmed that Choi Kyu-sun's business operations, money, and women relations, and the details of personnel appointments of high-ranking officials such as the NIS director were surveilled by wiretapping.

The NIS illegally used the R-2 wire monitoring system between 2000 and 2001. At that time, when digital cell phones began commercializing in 1996, the NIS developed six sets of R2s from 1998 to 1999 to wiretap mobile phones. In April 2001, Democratic Party leader Kim Yoon-hwan and Democratic Party representative Choi Kyu-sun, the head of the Future Urban Environment, and related figures were also wiretapped by the Choi Kyu-sun Gate, a power corruption case.

It has been confirmed that the contents of the ULD lawmaker Lee's phone call regarding Hwang Jang-yup's visit to the U.S. in 2001 and the dismissal of Unification Minister Lim Dong-won in the same year were also wiretapped. In April 2001, a telephone conversation between Kim Yoon-hwan of the Democratic People's Party and Kim Yoon-hwan of the Democratic Party also wiretapped. The contents of the NIS's call to the Provincial Police Agency between 1998 and 2002 were compiled into several A4 paper reports. At that time, NIS officials were reported to Deputy Director Kim Eun-sung and others every day in a half-sized report on A4 paper about the information gained by wiretapping.

According to Kim Eun-sung, the format of the intelligence report is to, "Write a title on a half-sized A4 paper, draw a line under the title, write a brief line, 'Hong Gil-dong talked to someone on the phone.'

The 25-page A4 data submitted by Chung Hyeong-Keun in October 2002 saying, "It contains the details of the National Intelligence Service's phone wiretapping," turned out to be true three years after the initial announcement in October 2002. However, during the investigation, the two former NIS chiefs flatly denied the allegations, and after the arrest, statements, and additional evidence of some director-level or higher officials, the full story was revealed in November 2005.

=== Wiretapping of the Democratic Party of Korea's younger politicians ===
The provincial government is not just for the Grand National Party, the Liberal Democratic Union, and the Democratic People's Party, but also for younger members of the Democratic Party. From October 2000 to November 2001, Kim Eun-sung, deputy director of the National Intelligence Service, and others are suspected of ordering NIS officials to illegally spy on politicians and others using wiretapping equipment.

The scandal is spreading as he ordered the then supreme council member Kwon Noh-Kap of the Democratic Party to listen to phone calls made between young members of the Democratic Party over the resignation in December 2000. According to a prosecutor's investigation in September 2005, the NIS also ordered Jin Seung-Hyun, a party of the gate, to wiretap several unspecified calls related to his acquisition of the company and illegal loans.

== NIS wiretapping and wiretapping practices ==
Former NIS chiefs and intelligence chiefs have ordered a ban on the provincial government. However, after their instructions, the provincial governor's report continued to be posted, and the directors and managers continued to receive it. After the charges were revealed in October 2005, Kim Eun-sung, one of the commanders of the case, admitted during the trial that the provincial government had already existed since before the Korean Central Intelligence Agency became the NIS in 1999. At the second hearing held at the Seoul Central District Court on 28 November, Kim Eun-sung said he knew there had been illegal wiretapping since the early 1970s when he joined the office.

"The defendant has served at the NIS since 1971," Kim said after making a statement to the effect that he "feels responsible for wiretapping" in a lawyer's newspaper. The "When did you know that employees were illegally wiretapping?" was asked in the court, he answered, "I knew from the beginning of my employment." It has been around since the early 1970s.

In addition, the Central Intelligence Agency, the National Intelligence Service, then-chiefs and directors of the National Intelligence Service ordered a ban on wiretapping and inspections. The next day, however, the wiretapping and wiretapping reports were posted on the desk of the head of the Central Intelligence Agency, the head of the National Intelligence Service, and the head of the NIS. Regarding the order of the directors to eradicate illegal wiretapping, "I've heard these four things for 30 years in the National Intelligence Service, 'Don't wiretapping, don't overpower, don't inspect politics, don't expose your identity," he said. "No director didn't talk about this, but the next day, the report went up." "The director ordered the eradication of wiretapping, but I didn't take it seriously because it was a kind of practice," a senior official said.

On 8 October, Kim Eun-sung said in a warrant review by the Seoul Central District Court, "The wiretapping was done conventionally in order to preserve the sovereignty of the state, not for the purpose of political inspection."

== Reinvestigation ==
=== Re-investigation background ===
On 1 May 2005, the Public Security Department of the Seoul Central District Prosecutors' Office cleared Shin Geon of the NIS's suspicion of wiretapping, which led to a dispute between the ruling and opposition parties ahead of the 2002 presidential election. The prosecution also concluded that it was technically impossible to determine whether the NIS had wiretapped its mobile phones. Kim Soo-min, the second deputy chief of the Seoul Central District Prosecutors' Office, said, "As a result of an on-site investigation of NIS officials and wiretapping facilities in the NIS, it was not confirmed that they were illegally wiretapping or had cell phone wiretapping equipment." In particular, the prosecution concluded that the documents released by Rep. Chung Hyung-Keun of the Grand National Party, calling them "the wiretapping details of the NIS," are difficult to see as documents by the NIS. However, in July of that year, Kim Ki-sam and others exposed the operation of the Mirim team by appearing in MBC's Son Seok-hee's eyes. Around that time, Park In-hee, a Korean-American who received data from the Mirim team's manager, threatened Samsung. However, Samsung filed a complaint against Park In-hee, believing that she was making false threats with fake information. And Park In-hee sends the data to the Hankyoreh newspaper through her acquaintance. Things are spread of Kim Dae-Jung administration became about the wiretapping of the investigation at the National Intelligence Service. Suspicions of illegal wiretapping of local politicians by the NIS began to be raised. Kim Eun-sung was accused of ordering NIS officials to illegally spy on politicians and others using wiretapping equipment from October 2000 to November 2001. The introduction of a new type of wiretapping equipment, instructions from the directors, and acquiescence will also be further investigated.

=== Confirmed illegal wiretapping ===
On 1 August, the National Assembly Intelligence Committee held a plenary session with Kim Seung-kyu, the head of the National Intelligence Service, to report the results of the first intermediate investigation into the X-file scandal. Kim Seung-Gyu was present to explain the truth about the Samsung X-file incident that occurred in July 2005 following the revelation of the Mirim team, Kim Ki-sam, and Park In-hee's scandal on Samsung, who took over some of the data from former employee Gong Team Leader. Lawmakers from the ruling and opposition parties criticized the illegal wiretapping practices of intelligence agencies in one voice, demanding accurate truth-finding, punishment of related officials, and measures to prevent a recurrence. In the NIS report, Kim said, "Through cooperation with the prosecution, 20 key people, including Korean-American Park In-hoe, have been subject to immigration regulations since the 22nd of last month, and major figures who have difficulty in immigration will be banned from leaving the country on the 29th of last month." Park, who was arrested by the prosecution on the 29th of last month, said, "If the NIS had already left the country because there was no suspension from leaving the country, the related investigation would have been in a mystery." "The investigation schedule has been disrupted due to self-inflicted injuries of Gong Un-Yeong, a key person involved, but we are investigating the Mirim team's illegal surveillance instructions, lines, and tape leaks in the hospital room in close cooperation with the prosecution," Kim stressed. Kim, however, said that some former NIS key figures have said they will take responsibility in the process, but have refused to make statements about the facts, making it difficult to proceed with the investigation quickly. Kim Seung-Gyu pointed out, "Oh Jung-so, former deputy chief of staff," when asked by lawmakers who were the key officials. However, Kim's "insincere" attitude at the time became a problem. "I will be reborn based on my reflection of past mistakes," Kim said. However, the details of the investigation and key issues were consistent with "I don't know," "I need to take more time to investigate," and "I don't know yet." When asked about the process of rebuilding Mirim and reporting lines of the special wiretapping team in 1994, Kim avoided an immediate answer, saying, "It is hard to say because I can't figure out the whole story." He also reportedly refused to comment on whether former NIS chief Chun Yong-Taek, who was reported to the media, was investigated, saying, "I will tell you later whether it was investigated or not." He also reportedly did not answer whether Mirim's team's wiretapping was reported to Hyun-Chul, the second son of former President Kim Young-sam. Kim Seung-Gyu, however, refuted the NIS's alleged wiretapping by the opposition party, saying, "The NIS is not currently conducting any illegal wiretapping." However, Rep. Kwon claimed that he did not give a clear answer to the question of Rep. Kwon Young-se of the Grand National Party, saying, "I can't confirm it now." Representative Kwon said, "Kim's failure to respond properly is interpreted as acknowledging the wiretapping of mobile phones," but the NIS said, "Technically, it is impossible to monitor mobile phones." During the Mirim Team incident and the National Security Agency X-Files incident, some of the facts of the provincial government were admitted. However, some senior NIS officials admitted to the charges when they began questioning the prosecution for wiretapping, recording data, and CCTV. On 5 August, Kim Seung-kyu, head of the National Intelligence Service, will partially admit that the wiretapping was in place. After Kim Seung-Gyu admitted to illegal wiretapping on 5 August, he met Shin several times or talked on the phone until he was arrested in late October. According to Kim Eun-sung's trial statement, "We have no choice but to reveal everything now." It's time for political positions to come forward and resolve them,' he suggested several times to do it. The Seoul Central District Prosecutors' Office and the Central Investigation Department of the Supreme Prosecutors' Office began an internal investigation of high-ranking NIS officials, believing that suspicions raised by Chung Hyeong-Keun were credible due to the Mirim team case and the National Security Agency's X-file case.

=== Re-investigation and evidence of suspicion ===
The prosecution concluded in April 2004 that it was technically impossible for the NIS to monitor mobile phones, which had been raised in connection with the case. On 1 April, Kim Soo-min, then deputy chief of the Seoul Central District Prosecutors` Office, said, "The investigation by NIS officials and on-site inspections of the NIS facilities have not confirmed that the NIS is illegally wiretapping or has mobile phone surveillance equipment." However, the investigation began again in July when the inspection of the Ministry of the Interior and Safety emerged.

The prosecution listed seven cases in the indictment of former Deputy Director Kim that the National Intelligence Service illegally wiretapped using R-2, a wire relay network monitoring equipment between 2000 and 2001. According to the prosecution, Kim Eun-sung was accused of wiretapping the Democratic-Liberal Party's policy coalition in April 2001 and wiretapping Choi Kyu-sun, the head of the Future Urban Environment Group. Kim was also found to have wiretapped phone calls regarding Hwang Jang-yup's visit to the U.S. in the summer of 2001 and illegally wiretapped phone calls between ULD lawmaker Lee and ULD officials in September that year.

Prosecutors investigating the "illegal wiretapping" case in October 2005 found that the heads of the NIS at the time of the government of Lim Dong-won and the new people conspired to illegally wiretapping. Also, five more cases of illegal wiretapping by Kim Eun-sung, former deputy director of the NIS, were found and included in the indictment. Prosecutors also found five additional wiretapping cases. The prosecution confirmed that two former NIS chiefs, Lim Dong-won and Shin Geon, conspired to illegally wiretapping. In an interview with the media in 2005, a prosecution official nailed, "In the indictment of Kim Eun-sung, former deputy director of the NIS, Kim conspired with former directors Lim Dong-won and Shin Geon to illegally wiretapping."

In addition to the two former chiefs, about 10 people, including one director of the Science and Security Bureau, one director, and one employee, were also cited as conspirators. Besides, the prosecution found seven more cases in which former deputy department head Kim Eun-sung illegally wiretapping using R2 (Al2), a wireline network wiretapping device, and included them in the indictment.

Accordingly, the prosecution summoned former directors Lim Dong-won and Shin Geon and took legal action as soon as further investigation into Kim Eun-sung was completed. The scandal spread in October 2005 after an investigation revealed allegations of indiscriminate wiretapping during the people's government. Three years after Chung Hyung-Keun raised suspicions in October 2002, the National Intelligence Service's act of wiretapping was found to be true. The incident made headlines along with the Mirim Team incident and the Samsung X file.

=== Suspected destruction of evidence and arrest of deputy chief ===
Suspected destruction of evidence and arrest of deputy chief were made. On 24 Sept., Shin Kun called Kim Eun-sung, a former deputy director in charge of domestic affairs, and Kim, a former director of Eight Countries in charge of the provincial government, for dinner. Kim had already confessed to the wiretapping at the prosecution. According to the prosecution's investigation, Shin Geon was angry at the former director Kim and ordered, "Revert the statement that you admitted to wiretapping," and "Represent that Korean wiretapping was for security purposes."

However, the prosecution was investigating their case. Prosecutors arrested Kim Eun-sung on 3 October after finding out the move to remove evidence. Deputy Director Kim Eun-sung was arrested on suspicion of destruction of evidence and escape. At the same time, the prosecution also imposed a travel ban on the two former NIS chiefs.

After the trial, a battle took place during the cross-examination process. Kim Eun-sung, in court, refuted Im Dong-won's claim that he denied wiretapping his cell phone. When Kim Eun-sung advised Lim in 2000, "If you use Cas, the director's cell phone can also be tapped," Lim ordered him to "make operational guidelines." At the same time, Kim's successor, Lee Soo-il, was also investigated.

== The course of a trial ==
=== Arrest and prosecution of deputy director and two former chiefs ===
In November 2005, Kim Eun-sung was accused of ordering employees to wiretap telephone conversations of key figures in Korea with wireline-based wiretapping equipment (R2) and mobile phone monitoring equipment (CAS) while working as deputy director of the NIS. Kim Sang-Chul, a senior judge at the Seoul Central District Court, sentenced Kim Eun-sung, former deputy chief of the National Intelligence Service, to two years in prison on the 23rd for violating the Communication Security Law.

Regarding former NIS chiefs Lim Dong-won and Shin Gun, they judged that they seemed to have implicitly conspired to illegally wiretapping. The court said, "The illegal wiretapping of the National Intelligence Service has raised fears that not only the victims of the wiretapping but also the general public can leak the contents of the call." The court then said, "The prosecution also judges this part for sentencing because they indicted the two former directors together like conspirators." "It is highly likely that they ignored the wiretapping."

Former NIS chiefs Lim Dong-won and Shin Geon consistently denied the charges in their first hearing on Wednesday. The two former presidents claimed at a hearing held at the Seoul Central District Court on the 22nd (Chief Judge Choi Wan-Joo) that "I have never received a report of communication intelligence written by illegal wiretapping." When the prosecution said, "The deputy director and the director and director stated that there was illegal surveillance of domestic personnel," Lim claimed, "If it was reported, he would have caught it and ordered it to quit."

"Kim Eun-sung, former deputy director of the NIS, made a court statement that he proposed to enact guidelines for the operation of the 'CAS', a wiretapping equipment, to prevent abuse of the wiretapping," Lim said. Lim Dong-won also said, "The NIS employees are professional information workers who have worked for 20-30 years, but the director is a traveler who works once," and added, "They must have had secrets about the director." Former director Shin also denied the charges, saying, "Simple intelligence from the working department is not reported to the NIS chief." "I have never received a communication intelligence report containing a list of key figures from Eight Countries (the department in charge of the National Intelligence Service), and if I knew it, I would have eliminated it," Shin said.

=== A rebuttal of the two principals ===
The key issue is whether the two directors received the report even though they knew it was collected through the provincial government. On 11 December, Lim Dong-won repeatedly argued, "The director of the National Intelligence Service receives only major information among the completed information," and added, "He did not order us to receive or collect illegal 'communication intelligence'."I knew that the National Assembly and the media had raised the issue of mobile phone tapping, so if I had known about it, I would have acted immediately," he said. "I believed in their report that there was no illegal wiretapping." "The National Intelligence Service failed to develop wiretapping equipment between mobile phones, but it was for legitimate wiretapping," he said. "We can wiretapping → mobile phones, but we haven't heard anything about wiretapping, and we've never heard of CAS or R2 names.

Shin Geon also said, "I don't know what the director is doing after receiving reports, but the prosecution relies too much on the statements of former deputy director Kim and employees of Eight Countries." "We will refute the results of the prosecution's investigation in the future." However, the prosecution showed confidence, saying that it has the necessary evidence for public ownership. "In addition to the statements made by the staff of the National Intelligence Service, there is also evidence to prove the allegations of the two directors," a prosecution official said. "There will be no major difficulties in public ownership."

=== A cover-up scandal ===
Some NIS officials testified in the statement that they were asked to reverse the statement by a senior official. Kim Eun-sung will also make the same statement. During the investigation, Kim Eun-sung stated that former NIS chief Shin Geon ordered the prosecution not to admit that he had illegally been wiretapped. During the investigation, Shin Geon ordered several former employees to reverse their statements at the next statement, saying, "Why did you admit it?"

Deputy Director Kim Eun-sung told investigators, "Why did Shin admit to Kim when he met with Kim, who served as director of the 8th bureau in charge of the wiretapping, at a restaurant in Gangnam, Seoul on September 24?" I heard him say, 'Revert your statement at the next prosecution investigation.' "We have met with Shin several times or talked on the phone until NIS chief Kim Seung-kyu admitted to the illegal wiretapping on August 5 and was arrested at the end of October. It's time for political positions to come forward and resolve them," he said several times.

=== Concealment directive excommunication ===
Deputy Director Kim Eun-sung also confessed that he knew that Eight Countries (Science Security Agency) had been conducting illegal surveillance for a long time since he was appointed as the second deputy director of the NIS in April 2000. Lim Dong-won, former director of the company, said, "I don't know if he knew about the illegal surveillance, but I think he knew it," citing four reasons, including the fact that there was no special action to upload the report every day. He added, "In response to the daily communication intelligence report to the director of the National Intelligence Service, the two directors once said, "We should be careful not to go outside." After Kim Eun-sung's statement, the Seoul Central District Prosecutors' Office and the Central Investigation Department of the Supreme Prosecutors' Office continued to investigate the former and current director-level officials.

=== Securing additional charges ===
Lim Dong-won and Shin Geon complained that they did not know the details of the information because the NIS director was a political official. However, during the trial, Shin Kun was found to have wiretapped Lee Hee-ho's nephew in December 2005.

The Seoul Central District Prosecutors' Office indicted former NIS chiefs Lim Dong-won and Shin Gun-Koo, who were arrested on charges of violating the Communication Secret Protection Act on 15 November, while on trial. According to the prosecution, they were accused of illegally wiretapping mobile phones of major figures in Korea by operating a three-shift, the 8th bureau's surveillance team during their tenure as NIS chief. They were also found to have received six to 10 reports of important items classified as A-level twice a day in the form of communication intelligence.[20] In particular, the prosecution found and included 10 additional cases of illegal wiretapping against Shin Kun.

Kim Eun-sung (60), former deputy director of the National Intelligence Service, told the court that Lim Dong-won and Shin Geon, former NIS chiefs, "caught" wiretapping. At the first hearing held at the Seoul Central District Court, Judge Kim Sang-Chul said, "The envelope containing the communication report comes to the director's desk every 12 months a year. If the report was not necessary, the director would have told me not to upload it anymore. "The NIS' illegal surveillance was pending at every parliamentary audit, but the director never ordered the inspection to be conducted at the NIS' internal investigation office," he said. "If not, why did he order to destroy the wiretapping equipment?" However, the two principals denied the allegations. They countered that they were not in a position to know exactly what was going on because they were in a political position.

Kim Eun-sung also said in a statement, "We met with former director Shin, his lawyer, 8 director Kim Byung-doo, and former deputy director Lee Soo-il on September 24 to discuss countermeasures." Kim also confessed that he met with Shin several times since August to discuss countermeasures. "The responsibility of the illegal wiretapping is not to the employees, but the commanders such as the deputy director and the director," he said. "I apologize to the people, and I confess to the restoration of the organization that has been in for 30 years." He is Kim Dae-Jung administration, from January 2001 to April 2000, Lim Dong-won and Shin Kuhn of wiretapping by serving as second deputy director under the instructions on 26 November, arrested and indicted on charges of.

== Lee Soo-il suicide scandal ==
Lee Soo-il, deputy director of the National Intelligence Service, who had been under internal investigation by the prosecution since August 2005, hanged himself at the office of the president of Honam University. He was questioned by the prosecution over whether he was involved in illegal wiretapping of the NIS' mobile phones during his tenure, and whether he reported the wiretapping to former director Shin Kun and others. The police investigated the exact circumstances of the suicide, believing that Lee killed himself because he could not overcome such psychological pressure.

Lee Soo-il was also suspected of handing over evidence to Chung Hyeong-Keun for his revelation in 2002. It has been reported that the NIS's wiretapping documents released by the Grand National Party ahead of the 2002 presidential election have also been investigated by Chung Hyung-Keun and former lawmaker Kim Young-il.

Former NIS chief Shin Gun, who he assisted, was arrested in connection with the case, and some executives who were in the provincial government's approval line were reportedly prosecuted, which led to intense mental pressure during the investigation. A person close to Lee said, "I understand that Lee's recent statements at the prosecution regarding the wiretapping incident did not match those of others and was in danger of being brought to justice."

Regarding Lee Soo-il's death, there were calls for responsibility for Shin Geon and Lim Dong-won. On 21 November, gukssamo (The former senior member of the intelligence community and of the NSP) Song Yeong-In, claimed to be "Lee Soo-il, former deputy chief of the National Intelligence Service committed suicide on January 20 is because of president Kim Dae-Jung and ex-chief Shin Gun". He appeared on the PBC Radio 'Open World' today! I'm Jang Sung-min,' and said "Even though it's already been revealed, (former President Kim) lied and insisted that he was not, which made Lee to commit suicide." He added, "I would have made the same decision as Lee. "

=== Denouncing public opinion ===
The Supreme Prosecutors' Office's fact-finding team, which investigated the suicide of former NIS deputy chief Lee Soo-il on 2 Dec., said it was found that the Seoul Central District Prosecutors' Office had no excessive investigation or human rights violations. Kwon Jae-jin, head of the investigation team, concluded, "Lee is presumed to have committed suicide by failing to overcome his remorse for making unfavorable statements about the NIS and the head of the NIS chief Kwon Jae-jin said. The investigation team investigated through reviewing the investigation records of the Central District Prosecutors' Office, listening to Lee's lawyer and high school alumni' statements, and checking phone call details, but did not find any special motivation for Lee's suicide.

The prosecution's fact-finding team added that △ Lee encountered Kim Eun-sung (60) at the prosecution and heard that he might have to testify in front of the director, later, he told "I'd rather die than die." △ "I tried to live with justice; where is the perfect person? I am really sorry to people around me" to his best friend on the day of suicide.

The former NIS employee Song Yeong-In said Kim Dae-Jung needs to be honest and apologize to the people. He added how Kim is smiling. He also added to Shin Geon, saying "He should not be shameless as the chief for so many years." In addition, he said, even himself as a former official of NIS, he does not understand how Kim Dae Jung appointed Shin as the Chief.

Song Young-in said that the investigation into illegal wiretapping was initiated by NIS chief Kim Seung-kyu, adding, "Didn't NIS chief Kim confess his conscience (for illegally wiretapping by the NIS) because he revealed the history? What did they do to the NIS organization that saved the country and led the security of the Republic of Korea to this point?" Song Young-in, a former NIS official, stressed, "As long as the NIS chief has asked the prosecution to investigate, the prosecution should make sure of the investigation and NIS employees should tell the prosecution what the director ordered." He added, "If you deny (the facts) like former President Kim and former NIS chief Shin Geon, former and current NIS employees will protest by suicide." The suicide of Lee Soo-il led to public criticism against the principals who denied the charges. The former head of the National Intelligence Service denied the charges, but after Lee Soo-il's suicide, he believed it was certain that the directors were involved and began to persuade internal investigations and statements about NIS officials.

=== The arrest of the director ===
In the wake of Lee Soo-il's suicide, the prosecution's investigation team decided to arrest the two chiefs. The investigation team announced the results of the investigation this morning, and Kwon Jae-jin, the head of the investigation team, said, "Lee Soo-il seems to have felt guilty for making unfavorable statements about the NIS and the former NIS chief."

The prosecution investigator said, "It seems that he took his own life because he could not overcome the psychological burden of testifying to Jeon's face during the future trial." He also said he met with prosecutors, provincial investigation teams, Lee's lawyer, NIS staff, and bereaved families to determine whether there were any problems such as human rights violations. The Supreme Prosecutors' Office has been conducting fact-finding activities with Kwon Jae-jin, head of the public security department, since 21 December, shortly after Lee committed suicide.

Judging that there was pressure on former chiefs, the prosecution planned to indict and arrest the two former NIS chiefs on the morning of 2 December. The Seoul Central District Prosecutors' Office said it will indict former NIS chiefs Lim Dong-won and Shin Geon as early as this afternoon. The prosecution planned an arrest investigation of the two directors as allegations arose that there was pressure on employees along with the demand for a reversal of the statement.

== Result ==
Shin Geon was accused of wiretapping Lee Hee-ho's nephew Lee Hyung-taek's "Treasure Ship Salvage Project" in December 2001 and the "Democratic Party presidential nomination" between then-Democratic Party lawmakers Lee Kang-rae and KBS President Park Kwon-sang in March 2002. Shin was found to have received a report from Eight Countries, which were the department of wiretapping in 1998, on the development of wiretapping network monitoring equipment and the development plan of mobile wiretapping equipment.

Former director Lim Dong-won was asked to enact operational guidelines for the equipment after receiving a report from Deputy Director Kim Eun-sung on the completion of the development of 20 sets of CAS mobile interception equipment in May 2000. Unlike his wife, the prosecution's investigation revealed that the two former chiefs were also involved in the development of wiretapping equipment. As the allegations were revealed, the Seoul Central District Prosecutors' Office arrested and indicted two former NIS chiefs, Lim Dong-won and Shin Geon, on charges of violating the Communication Secret Protection Act on 2 December.

The prosecution said, "The National Intelligence Service violated the president's order to eradicate wiretapping and actually conducted domestic political inspections using illegal wiretapping." On 2 December, two former heads of the National Intelligence Service, Lim Dong-won and Shin Geon, arrested and imprisoned additional suspects. As a result, the alleged wiretapping of the NIS revealed by Jeong Hyeong-Geun turned out to be true after three years and three months.

== Additional information ==
The wiretapping of the NIS was a national crime committed chronically since the 3rd Republic when the Korean Central Intelligence Agency was established. Even in the era of dictatorship, the failure of presidents to eradicate wiretapping in the democratic era shows that vivid wiretapping information is a temptation for the ruling party to resist.

Meanwhile, Kim Eun-sung and others met then GNP chief of staff Lee Hoi-chang to ask for cooperation in the Anpung case, and in June 2000, former Democratic Party lawmaker Jang Sung-min criticized Kwon No-gap.

During the trial, Kim Eun-sung's statement said, "Director Lim Dong-won is trying to reform too rapidly. Meet me and warn me." In addition, NIS officials also intervened in the issue of private interests with the materials they heard. Some senior NIS officials met with Rep. Lee Shin-beom and others as Lim Dong-won ordered "meet Lee Shin-beom and give him some slack" over Kim Hong-gul's house lawsuit.
