= Suh Hoon =

Former South Korean government official

- 서훈
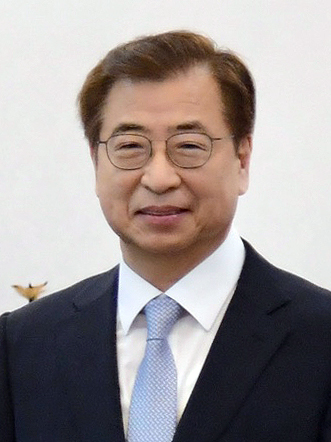
- Suh Hoon in 2020

Director of National Security Office
- In office 3 July 2020 – 9 May 2022
- President: Moon Jae-in
- Preceded by: Chung Eui-yong
- Succeeded by: Kim Sung-han

13th Director of the National Intelligence Service
- In office 1 June 2017 – 2 July 2020
- President: Moon Jae-in
- Preceded by: Lee Byung-ho
- Succeeded by: Park Jie-won

Personal details
- Born: 1954 (age 71–72)

Korean name
- Hangul: 서훈
- Hanja: 徐薰
- RR: Seo Hun
- MR: Sŏ Hun

Suh Hoon (Korean: 서훈; born 1954) is a South Korean government official who served as the Director of National Security Office from 2020 to 2022 and previously as the director of the National Intelligence Service from 2017 to 2020.

== Overview ==
In 1980, he started public service at the Ministry of National Security Planning with 17 public affairs and worked for National Intelligence Service for 28 years and 3 months until his retirement in March 2008. He was the third deputy of the Roh Moo-hyun administration after going through the Strategic Chief of the National Intelligence Service. In 2017, he was appointed as President Moon Jae-in's first director of National Intelligence Service. In July 2020 he was designated as Moon's second director of National Security Office replacing Chung Eui-yong. This makes Suh as one of four people who continue to serve President Moon as cabinet minister or ministerial-level government official from the beginning of Moon's presidency in 2017 along with Hong Nam-ki, Kim Sang-jo and Kang Kyung-wha as of December 2020.

== Education ==
- BA in education, Seoul National University
- Johns Hopkins University Graduate School of International Politics
- Dongguk University Graduate School of North Korean Studies

== Career ==
- 1996: Representative of Korean Peninsula Energy Development Organization
- February 2004: Chief of information security office of National Security Council
- December 2004: Chief Strategy Officer of the National Intelligence Service
- November 2006: The third deputy director of the National Intelligence Service Visiting Professor, Department of North Korean Studies, Ewha Womans University
- June 2017: Director of the 13th National Intelligence Service of South Korea
- July 2020: Director of National Security Office

== Political activity ==
- In March 2018, Suh visited Pyongyang, North Korea for discussing the required steps to denuclearization of North Korea
- Suh briefed Japanese Prime Minister Shinzo Abe and foreign minister the same month after his Pyongyang visit.
- Suh Hoon played a critical role in historical April 2018 inter-Korean summit. He also helped establish two previous first and second inter-Korean summits in 2000 and 2007, is seen as the country's prime expert on the subject with North Korea. He is known as the South Korean who met with the previous North Korean leader Kim Jong-il the most.
- In April 2018, Suh Hoon visited North Korea as a South Korean envoy for organising the historic inter-Korean summit. He entered North Korea with a high-level delegation of South Korean officials.

== Arrest ==
In December 2022 Suh was arrested in South Korea on charges of tampering with evidence that was related to the killing of a South Korean Ministry of Oceans and Fisheries official by North Korean espionage agents near the Northern Limit Line in September 2020. He was acquitted in December 2025.

In February 2025, Suh was sentenced to a suspended prison term of ten months by the Seoul Central District Court for abuse of power involving the forced repatriation of two North Korean fishermen who had killed 16 of their colleagues in the Sea of Japan in 2019.

== See also ==
- 2018 North Korea–United States summit
- April 2018 inter-Korean summit
- May 2018 inter-Korean summit

Political offices
Preceded by Lee Byung-ho	Director of the National Intelligence Service; 2017–2020	Succeeded by Park Jie-won
Preceded by Chung Eui-yong	Director of National Security Office; 2020–present	Incumbent
