= April 2018 inter-Korean summit =

International summit

April 2018 Inter-Korean summit South Korea: 2018년 남북정상회담 North Korea: 2018년 북남수뇌상봉
- 27 April 2018
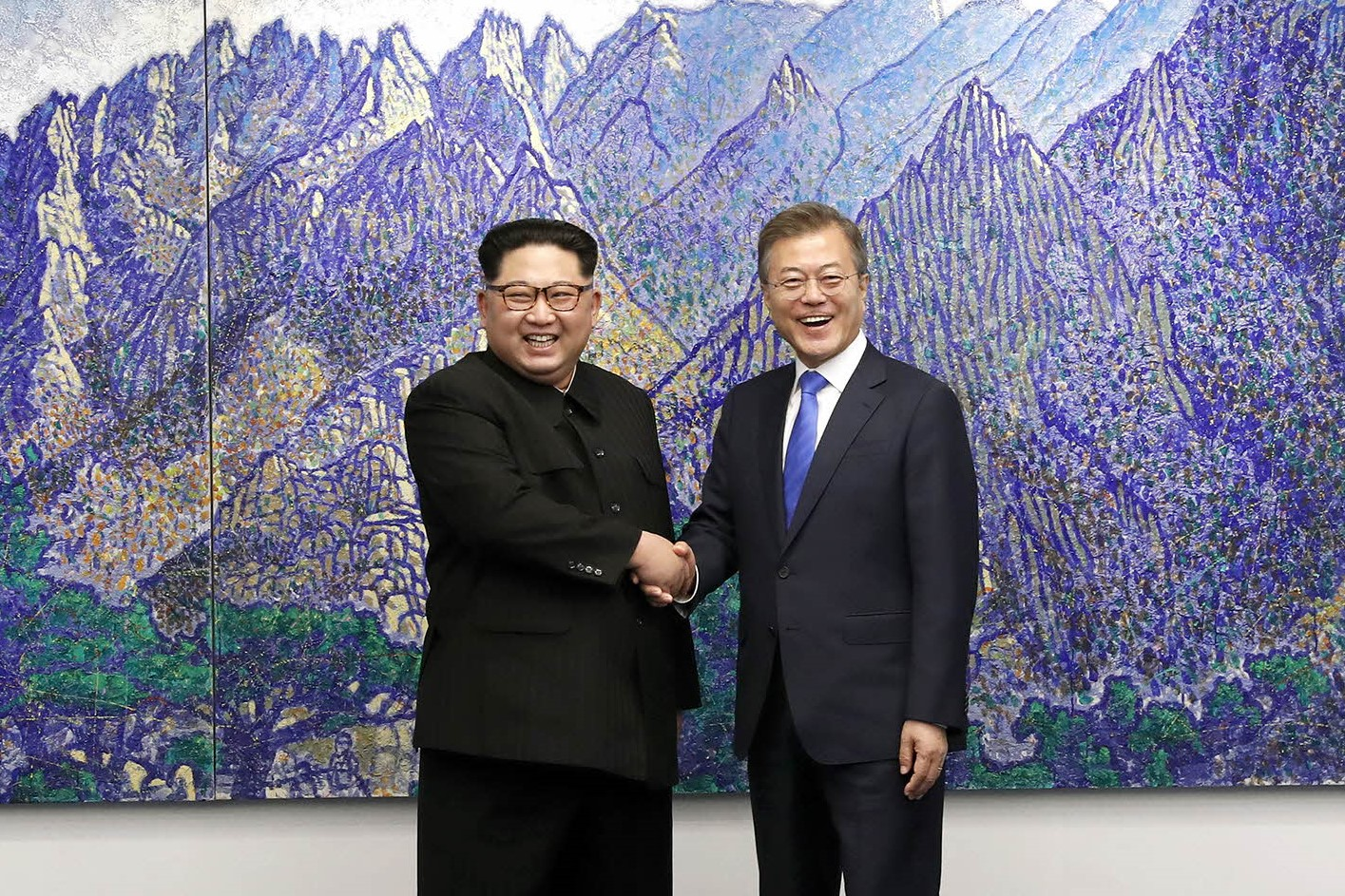
- Kim Jong Un shakes hands with Moon Jae-in
- Host country: South Korea
- Motto: 평화, 새로운 시작 (Peace, A New Start)
- Venues: Inter-Korean Peace House
- Participants: (North Korea) Kim Jong Un (South Korea) Moon Jae-in
- Website: 2018 Inter-Korean Summit

The April 2018 inter-Korean summit took place on 27 April 2018 on the South Korean side of the Joint Security Area, between Moon Jae-in, President of South Korea, and Kim Jong Un, Chairman of the Workers' Party of Korea and Supreme Leader of North Korea. The summit was the third inter-Korean summit – the first in eleven years. It was also the first time since the end of the Korean War in 1953 that a North Korean leader entered the South's territory; President Moon also briefly crossed into the North's territory.

The summit took place after the two sides had already held several meetings in preparation for their joint attendance at the 2018 Winter Olympics. The idea was initially brought forward through an official invitation from the North to conduct a meeting. The summit was focused on the North Korean nuclear weapons program and denuclearization of the Korean Peninsula. The Panmunjom Declaration was made following the summit.

== Terminology ==
South Korean media and the Blue House called the meeting the 2018 North-South Summit Meeting (Korean: 2018년남북정상회담). The latter explained that the official reason for not calling the meeting the third inter-Korean meeting was that they hoped the inter-Korean summit would no longer be a "special event" but could be held regularly. Rodong Sinmun, the official newspaper of the Workers' Party of Korea, called it the 2018 North-South Summit Meeting (Korean: 2018년북남수뇌상봉). The slogan of the meeting was "Peace, A New Start" (Korean: 평화, 새로운시작).

== Background ==
=== Winter Olympics breakthrough ===
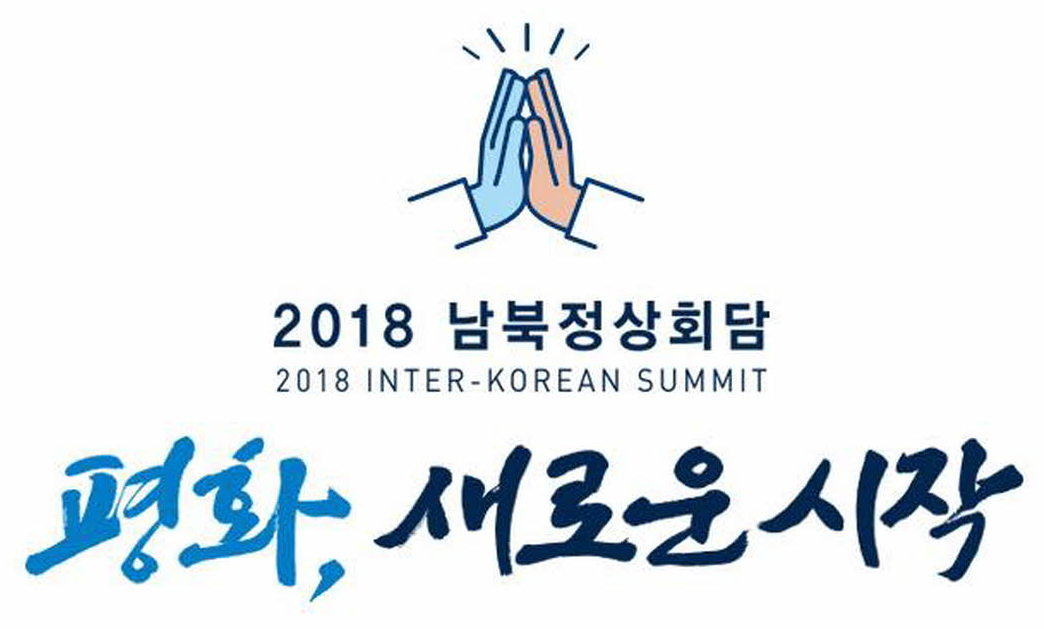
Logo of the 2018 Inter-Korean Summit

On 6 July 2017, South Korean President Moon Jae-in delivered a speech entitled "Berlin Peace Initiative" at the Körber Foundation in Germany, stating that in order to ease tensions on the Korean Peninsula, it is necessary to establish lasting peace through dialogue.

North and South Korea must join hands to achieve a breakthrough in their peace process. I propose to North Korea that we begin with the easier things. … Fourth, resume contact and dialogue for peace and cooperation on the peninsula. Easing tensions on the peninsula is the most pressing issue. The current lack of contact between the authorities is extremely dangerous. To address the current situation, we need to initiate contact and engage in meaningful dialogue. Furthermore, I am willing to meet with North Korean leader Kim Jong Un anytime, anywhere, if the conditions are met. Now is the time to change the tensions and confrontation on the peninsula. We can put all bilateral interests, including the nuclear issue and the peace treaty, on the table to discuss peace on the peninsula and North-South cooperation. This will be more than just a dialogue; a journey of a thousand miles begins with a single step. I look forward to North Korea's decision.

In addition, Moon advocated taking the Chuseok as an opportunity to hold a reunion of separated families that had been suspended for many years; taking the signing of the armistice agreement as an opportunity to stop hostile acts on the military demarcation line; and inviting North Korea to participate in the 2018 Winter Olympics to be held in Pyeongchang the following year. Pyongyang initially had an ambiguous attitude toward the "Berlin concept". On 15 July, North Korean state media Rodong Sinmun published a commentary entitled "We should find out what the path to achieving peace and unification on the Korean Peninsula is", which pointed out that Moon's suggestion to dialogue was "a dreamlike sophistry" and criticized him for advocating dialogue on the one hand and imposing economic sanctions on North Korea on the other hand, which it said was self-contradictory. However, at the same time, the evaluation left some room for maneuver and praised him for "determined to respect and implement the June 15 Joint Declaration and the October 4 Declaration".

As 2018 began, the situation on the Korean Peninsula changed. In his New Year's address, North Korean leader Kim Jong Un expressed his willingness to improve relations between the two countries: "We look forward to achieving results at the Pyeongchang Winter Olympics and will send a delegation. To this end, we may hold talks as soon as possible." Thus, the two countries held a ministerial meeting at the Peace House on 9 January. North Korea agreed to send a team to participate in the Pyeongchang Winter Olympics and would send a cheerleading team, an art troupe, a visiting group, a taekwondo performance group, and a press delegation to visit South Korea during the Games. On 9 February, Kim Jong Un sent his younger sister, Kim Yo Jong, First Deputy Department Director of the Central Committee of the Workers' Party of Korea, along with senior cadres of the Workers' Party of Korea, including Kim Yong-nam, the President of the Presidium of the Supreme People's Assembly, to attend the opening ceremony of the Winter Olympics and visit South Korea for three days. During the opening ceremony, athletes from both countries carried the Korean Unification Flag together. On 5 March, the South Korean special envoy returned to Pyongyang, North Korea. After the meeting, Chung Eui-yong announced that the third inter-Korean summit would be held at the end of April. In order to create a friendly atmosphere, the two countries took several actions in April. Kim Jong Un first invited South Korean artists to perform in Pyongyang, and later announced at a meeting of the Workers' Party of Korea that a hotline between leaders would be opened, nuclear tests and intercontinental ballistic missile launch tests would be suspended, and the nuclear test site would be closed. South Korea stopped using loudspeakers to broadcast messages to North Korea at the border.

=== Preparation and Implementation ===
In preparation for the upcoming summit, officials from both sides met at Panmunjom on 29 March for 1 hour and 31 minutes. After the meeting, the two sides issued a joint statement announcing that the 2018 summit would be held at the Peace House in the Korean Demilitarized Zone south of Panmunjom, which was accepted as the meeting's location by North Korea from among the venues proposed by South Korea. The two Koreas' high government officials held a working-level meeting on 4 April 2018 to discuss summit details at the Peace House. The agenda was planned to include denuclearization, peace establishment and improvement of inter-Korean relations for their mutual benefit. More than 200 NGOs called for human rights issues in the North to be added to the agenda and Japanese Prime Minister Shinzō Abe petitioned to include the North Korean abductions of Japanese citizens as well, but these topics were ultimately excluded from the summit. The official website of the Blue House had a petition that was signed by over a thousand people who opposed the reception.

On 14 April, the two countries discussed communications at the Unification Pavilion north of the demarcation line. The following day, the Blue House stated at a press conference that the slogan of the meeting was "Peace, A New Start," and indicated that the talks and the subsequent North Korea-U.S. summit were "confirmed." On 25 April the South Korean Ministry of National Defense stated that in order to reflect "high-level courtesy and mutual respect," the Army, Navy and Air Force honor guards would perform the protocol duties for the talks, and Kim Jong Un would inspect the guard of honors. This was the first time that the North Korean leader had inspected South Korea's guard of honors. In addition, given the limited space at Panmunjom, the guard of honor inspection ceremony would be simplified. There was some controversy with the arrangement of a joint-service guard of honor formed by the Republic of Korea Armed Forces for Kim. The Ministry of National Defense justified this move by pointing out that Presidents Kim Dae-jung and Roh Moo-hyun were given an equally welcoming reception during their visits to North Korea in 2000 and 2007, respectively. The Ministry also used the Cold War as a historical reference, saying that "when violent conflicts continued between the United States and the Soviet Union, the United States and China, honor guards were organized for leaders of other countries".

On 26 April, Im Jong-seok, chairman of the preparatory committee for the inter-Korean summit, announced the specific schedule for the summit and confirmed the official list of accompanying personnel, as follows:

==== North Korea ====
- Kim Yong-nam, President of the Presidium of the Supreme People's Assembly
- Kim Yo Jong, sister of Kim Jong Un, alternate member of the Politburo
- Kim Yong-chol, Vice Chairman of the Workers' Party of Korea
- Choe Hwi, Vice Chairman of the Workers' Party of Korea
- Ri Son-gwon, Chairman of the Committee for the Peaceful Reunification of the Fatherland
- Ri Myong-su, Chief of the General Staff of the Korean People's Army
- Ri Yong-ho, Minister of Foreign Affairs
- Ri Su-yong, Vice Chairman of the Workers' Party of Korea
- Pak Yong-sik, Minister of People's Armed Forces

==== South Korea ====
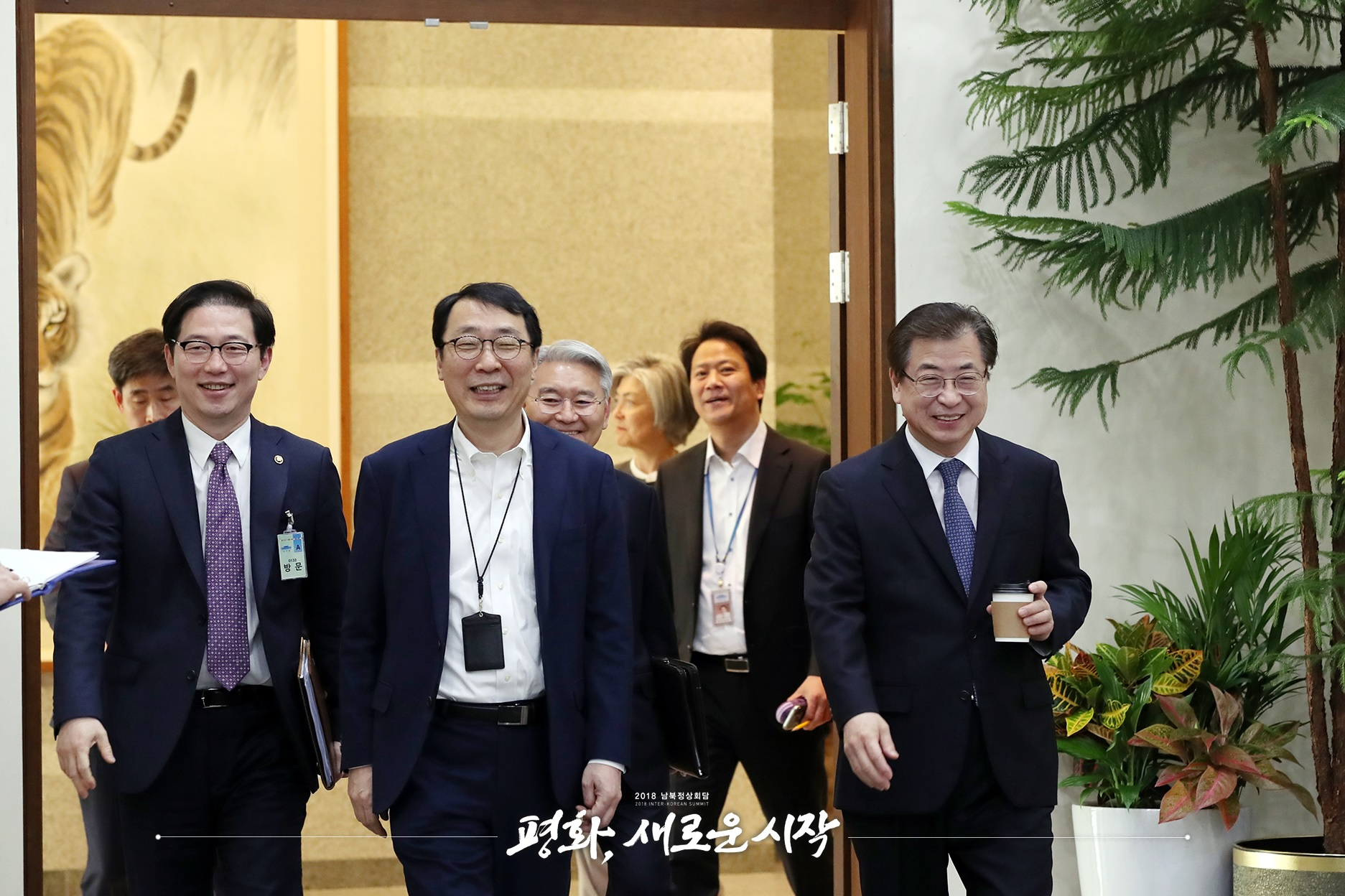
Members of the South Korean delegation

- Chung Eui-yong, Director of the Office of National Security
- Suh Hoon, Director of the National Intelligence Service
- Cho Myoung-gyon, Minister of Unification
- Im Jong-seok, Chief of Staff to the President
- Song Young-moo, Minister of National Defense
- Kang Kyung-wha, Minister of Foreign Affairs
- Jeong Kyeong-doo, Chairman of the Joint Chiefs of Staff

== Meeting ==
=== Morning ===
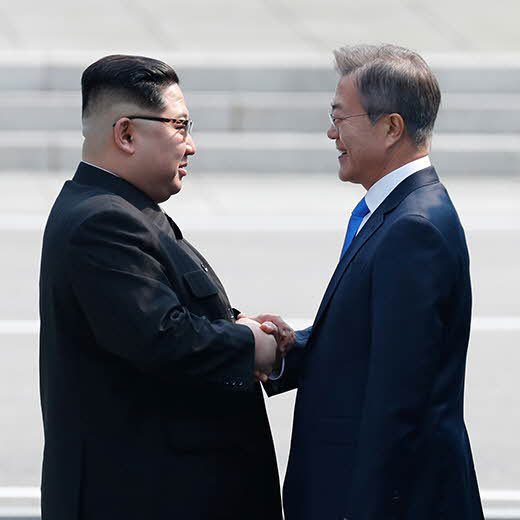
Moon and Kim shaking hands over the demarcation line

At 9:30 a.m. Seoul time on 27 April 2018 (9:00 a.m. Pyongyang time; 0:30 a.m. UTC), Kim Jong Un crossed the military demarcation line and entered the South Korean side, where he was welcomed by Moon Jae-in who was waiting by the line. The meeting was the first visit by a North Korean leader to South Korean territory after the Korean War (1950–53). The start of the meeting was broadcast live and featured the two leaders shaking hands over the demarcation line. The two addressed each other in their formal capacities. Moon Jae-in addressed Kim Jong Un as "Chairman", while Kim Jong Un addressed Moon Jae-in as "President". Moon Jae-in asked when he could visit North Korea, and Kim Jong Un responded "now." Moon then accepted an invitation from Kim to briefly step over to the North's side of the line, a seemingly impromptu moment. The two crossed the military demarcation line hand in hand and briefly stayed in the North Korean territory before walking hand in hand into the South Korean territory.

Afterwards, two children living in Daeseong-dong presented flowers to Kim Jong Un. Subsequently, the South Korean side held a traditional welcoming ceremony for Kim Jong Un, including the drum ceremony, the Arirang ceremony, and a military parade. This was also the first time that the North Korean leader had inspected the South Korean honor guard. As the two were on their way to the main platform with the honor guard, Moon Jae-in said to Kim Jong Un, "Foreign countries also like traditional honor guards, but today we are presenting you with a simplified version, which is a bit of a pity. If you come to the Blue House, we can show you a better scene." Kim Jong Un responded, "Oh, is that so? If the President gives me an invitation, I can go to the Blue House anytime." Afterwards, the two entered the Peace House, where Kim Jong Un personally wrote in the guestbook: "A new history begins now, standing at the starting point of an era of peace and history. Kim Jong Un 2018.4.27".

At around 10:15 Seoul time, the two leaders held formal talks on the topic of denuclearization of the Korean Peninsula. Analysts also believe that the two discussed issues such as a peace mechanism to ease military tensions on the peninsula and economic cooperation. The talks lasted about 100 minutes in the morning, and both leaders were satisfied with the talks. Moon Jae-in said that he had a "beneficial discussion" with Kim Jong Un and hoped to "present a great gift" to the people of both countries and the world. Kim Jong Un said that "this is just the beginning" and hoped that the contents of the talks would be "satisfactory to some extent" to all parties after they were compiled and released. At noon, the two leaders had lunch separately, and Kim Jong Un returned to the North Korean territory to have lunch.

=== Afternoon ===
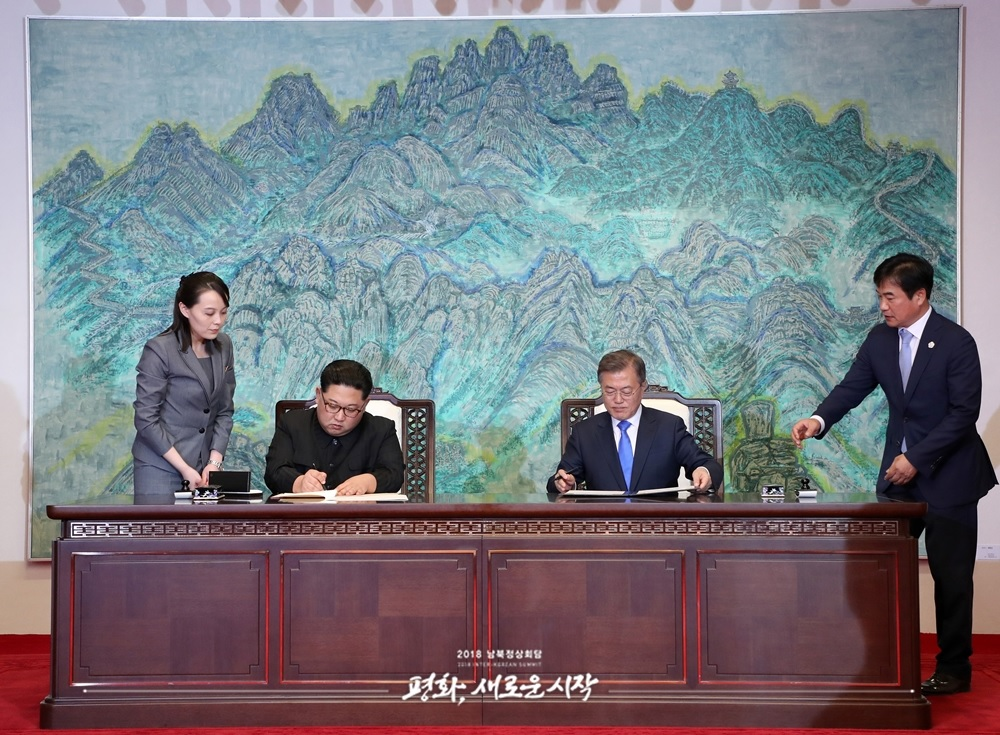
Kim and Moon signing the Panmunjom Declaration

Along with the scheduled talks, the two leaders conducted a tree-planting ceremony using soil and water from both territories and attended a banquet. In the afternoon, Moon Jae-in and Kim Jong Un planted a tree together and erected a tree-planting monument. Many elements of the meeting were expressly designed for symbolism, including an oval meeting table measuring 2,018 millimetres to represent the year. The tree used in the ceremony was a pine tree from 1953, the year the Korean Armistice Agreement was signed. The pine tree was planted in a mixture of soil taken from Mount Paektu in North Korea and Mount Halla in South Korea, and the irrigation water came from the Taedong River in North Korea and the Han River in South Korea. After the tree-planting activity, the two leaders took a walk and talked together, and then returned to the Peace House for the afternoon talks. After the talks, the two sides signed the Panmunjom Declaration for the Promotion of Peace, Prosperity and Unification of the Korean Peninsula and published the contents of the agreement.

Notably, these included the two countries agreeing to completely abandon nuclear weapons a pledge to work towards the denuclearization of the Korean Peninsula, although Kim did not explicitly agree to give up the North's nuclear weapons. The two leaders also agreed to convert the Korean Armistice Agreement into a full peace treaty later that year, formally ending the Korean War after 65 years. Additionally, they pledged to end "hostile activities" between their nations, exchange views through hotline telephone. resume reunion meetings for divided families on Liberation Day, hold high-level talks and dialogues in various fields in the near future, improve connections along their border, cease propaganda broadcasts across the border from 1 May, and jointly participate in the 2018 Asian Games. In addition, South Korea would also open a permanent liaison office in Kaesong, a city on the border of North Korea. Subsequently, Moon Jae-in and Kim Jong Un attended the press conference together. In the joint press conference, Kim and Moon made a number of pledges regarding co-operation and peace. As the press conference concluded, the two leaders pledged greater communication between themselves and planned for Moon to visit Pyongyang in late 2018.

=== Dinner ===
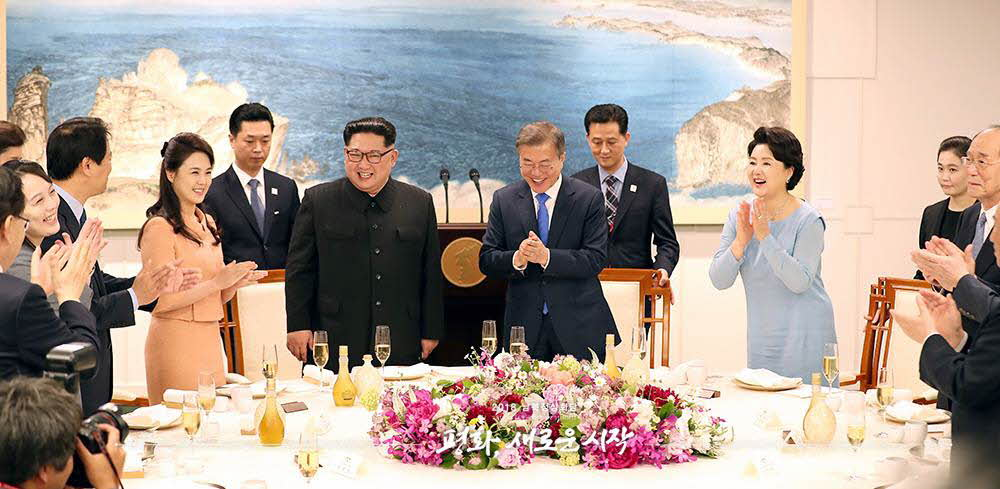
Kim and Moon dining at the summit

After the meeting, the two sides had a dinner together. A total of 32 people from South Korea attended the dinner, including the delegation itself, First Lady Kim Jung-sook, Choo Mi-ae, representative of the ruling Democratic Party, Do Jong-hwan, Minister of Culture and Sports, Park Yong-man, Chairman of the Federation of Korean Industries, and singer Cho Yong-pil. North Korea sent 26 people to attend. Lee Myung-soo, Park Young-sik and Lee Yong-ho had already returned to their country. In their place were First Lady Ri Sol-ju, Hyon Song-wol, director of the Samjiyon Orchestra, and others who had visited South Korea and had connections with the South Korean side or were aides who assisted Kim Jong Un. This was the first time that the leaders of North and South Korea met together with their first ladies. Before the dinner, artists from both countries played several songs together with the haegeum and ongnyugeum, symbolizing overcoming differences and harmonious resonance.

The dinner menu included yellow croaker, sea cucumber dumplings, duck rice, grilled bream, and Pyongyang Okryu-gwan naengmyeon. These dishes were symbolic: the yellow croaker and sea cucumber came from Sinan County, Jeonnam-Gwangju, the hometown of former South Korean President Kim Dae-jung; the duck rice came from Bongha Village, where former President Roh Moo-hyun farmed after leaving office; and the grilled bream was a dish from Busan, the hometown of Moon Jae-in. In addition, the naengmyeon were ordered by North Korea for Moon Jae-in, and the Korean Swiss potato pancakes were prepared by South Korea for Kim Jong Un, who had studied in Switzerland. After the dinner, officials from both sides watched a light show and held a farewell ceremony. The farewell ceremony lasted about 10 minutes. A short film titled Spring was shown on the outer wall of the Peace House, telling the story of "the past, present and future of the Korean Peninsula". After that, traditional instruments and an orchestra played the folk songs "Arirang" and "Bird, Bird, Bluebird". Finally, scenes of the talks and the song "One Dream One Korea" were played. At about 9:15 p.m. Seoul time, Kim Jong Un returned to Pyongyang.

== Reactions ==
=== North Korea ===
- North Korea's propaganda apparatus made no comment on the day of the talks, only reporting that North Korean leader Kim Jong Un had gone to the south of Panmunjom for a "historic" meeting. Meanwhile, the Korean Central Television did not broadcast the talks live due to the country's policy is to not broadcast live events involving its leader, but only recorded a report at 3 p.m. The next day, state media announced the results of the meeting, stating that "there will be no more war on the Korean Peninsula and a new era of peace has begun." Rodong Sinmun reported on the meeting on the same day with four of its six pages and 62 color photos, attributing the results of the talks to Kim Jong Un, saying that he had changed the relationship between North and South Korea with "a boundless love for the country and superb political skills." However, the newspaper did not tell how North Korea would implement denuclearization.
- The South Korea-based website NK News interviewed foreigners living in Pyongyang and North Korean businessmen trading along the China–North Korea border to observe their reactions to the talks and found that most people were happy about them. The report indicated that Pyongyang citizens were satisfied with the outcome of the talks and believed that the Kaesong Industrial Region would be restarted; North Korean businessmen told reporters that the talks were a "special moment" and that they found the meeting between the two leaders "unbelievable."

=== South Korea ===
- Kim Hyun-jung, a spokesperson for the ruling Democratic Party, said at a press conference after Moon Jae-in and Kim Jong Un issued a declaration that the declaration was not only a turning point in inter-Korean relations, but also a turning point in the situation on the Korean Peninsula. Choi Gyung-hwan a spokesperson for the Party for Democracy and Peace, said the declaration was a "new historical milestone for peace and prosperity" and would "open up the destiny of the Korean Peninsula." The Bareunmirae Party was satisfied with the results, but at the same time urged the two countries to reach a consensus on a concrete plan for denuclearization.
- The opposition Liberty Korea Party was dissatisfied with the talks. Representative Hong Joon-pyo criticized the inter-Korean summit as a "fake peace show" put on by Kim Jong Un and Moon Jae-in, and believed that North Korea would not repeat its promise of denuclearization. He also questioned whether Moon's handling of the North Korean nuclear issue could truly protect the lives and property of the people. The party's floor leader Kim Sung-tae said that the talks were a turning point in inter-Korean relations and he was pleased with it, but at the same time reminded the public not to be misled by the current atmosphere, because the nuclear issue would not be completely resolved. Lawmaker Na Kyung-won believed that North Korea had not put forward any concrete plan for denuclearization and was frustrated with the outcome of the talks.
- In the public, the conservative organization "National Emergency Countermeasures Committee" called on 300 members to hold a protest rally at Imjingak on the day of the talks, claiming that the talks were a "peaceful fraud". During the rally, members clashed with groups supporting the talks, but no injuries were caused. In addition, there was a rally in Jung District, Seoul, against the talks, but no clashes occurred during the rally.
- On 30 April, the Korean Broadcasting System conducted an online survey of 1,077 people aged 19 and over across the country. The results showed that 94% of the respondents were sure about the outcome of the talks, and more than 70% believed that North Korea would implement its denuclearization declaration. The Munhwa Broadcasting Corporation commissioned the Korea Survey Center to conduct a telephone survey of more than 1,000 people aged 19 and over across the country. The survey found that 88% of the respondents gave a positive evaluation of the talks, and 77.5% trusted Kim Jong Un. CBS conducted a survey of 500 adult citizens after the talks. 64.7% of the respondents expressed "trust in North Korea", compared to only 14.7% before the talks, while 78.3% did not trust the country.

=== International reactions ===
- China: On 27 April, Lu Kang, spokesperson for the Ministry of Foreign Affairs of China, expressed his congratulations and welcome to the successful convening of the meeting and stated that the meeting had a positive impact on promoting peace and stability on the Korean Peninsula. He hoped that all parties concerned would continue to maintain and develop this good situation. At a press conference, Foreign Ministry spokesperson Hua Chunying stated, "We applaud the historic step taken by the leaders of North and South Korea, appreciate their political resolve and courage, and sincerely wish this meeting a positive outcome." She also added, "We look forward to using this historic Panmunjom meeting as an opportunity to further embark on a new journey of lasting peace and stability on the Korean Peninsula." She also quoted a poem, saying, "Having weathered countless storms, brothers remain; a smile at our reunion dissolves all enmity."
- Japan: Japanese Prime Minister Shinzo Abe welcomed the outcome of the talks, calling the declaration "positive" and expressing his expectation that North Korea would take concrete action on denuclearization. At the same time, he said that Japan would work closely with other countries on the Korean Peninsula issue. One of the desserts served at the dinner was a mango mousse decorated with a map of the Korean Peninsula, showing the disputed Dokdo (known as Takeshima in Japan). Japan protested the move, On 24 April 2018, the Japanese Foreign Ministry protested to the Embassy of the South Korea in Japan, citing the appearance of desserts named "Dokdo" on the dinner menu that was to be used during the summit. Dokdo is the Korean name of a small island group, known as Takeshima in Japanese, that is midway between South Korea and Japan. It is the subject of a long-standing sovereignty dispute. The mango mousse desserts were accompanied by Korean-style decorations and a depiction of the Korean Peninsula that included the islands. On 27 April 2018, Taro Kono, Japanese Minister of Foreign Affairs, said he felt it was unnecessary to have a "Dokdo" dessert and reiterated claims that the island group is a territory of Japan. Despite the complaint, the Dokdo desserts were served to both Moon Jae-in and Kim Jong Un during the summit. Both men also personally cracked open their desserts with small mallets to symbolize a new relationship.
- Russia: The Kremlin hailed the summit between North and South Korea as good news, saying that President Vladimir Putin has long advocated for direct dialogue between the two Koreas. When asked whether U.S. President Donald Trump was also expected to meet with North Korean leader Kim Jong Un, Kremlin spokesman Dmitry Peskov said that Russia would welcome any move that would help reduce tensions on the Korean Peninsula.
- Taiwan: The Taiwanese government said it is optimistic about the successful holding of the third summit between North and South Korea. The Ministry of Foreign Affairs issued a press release in its official position, stating that the Republic of China supports the regional denuclearization position and hopes that all parties concerned will continue to resolve the relevant issues on the Korean Peninsula peacefully through dialogue. As an important member of the East Asian region, the Republic of China would not only continue to closely monitor the development of the relevant situation, but also make positive contributions and work with the international community to promote the early realization of regional peace, stability and prosperity.
- United Kingdom: British Foreign Secretary Boris Johnson issued a statement saying: "I welcome the announcement that the two Koreas will work towards the complete, verifiable, and irreversible denuclearisation of North Korea, improve bilateral ties and reduce border tensions." He said "The UK will continue to work with our international partners to strictly enforce existing sanctions until such time that North Korea turns its commitments into concrete steps towards denuclearisation."
- United States: After the talks, U.S. President Donald Trump made several comments on his Twitter account, saying that the outcome of the talks was "good," especially that Kim and Moon had helped to formally end the Korean War. However, he also said that time would tell whether Pyongyang would keep its promises, and stressed that he would not be "played" by Kim Jong Un in the upcoming U.S.-North Korea talks. Vice President Mike Pence issued a statement saying that the peace agreement between North and South Korea is a step toward the denuclearization of the Korean Peninsula; however, the U.S. would remain cautious and reserved about any assurances from North Korea. Preparations for the U.S.-North Korea summit would continue, but U.S. sanctions against North Korea would not be eased.

== Aftermath ==
On 30 April, the third day after the talks, Kim Jong Un first announced that he would unify Pyongyang time and Seoul time on 5 May. He said that he was saddened to see two clocks with Pyongyang time and Seoul time on the wall of the Peace House, hence the decision. On the same day, the South Korean Ministry of National Defense said it would remove dozens of loudspeaker broadcasting devices facing North Korea from the front line of the demilitarized zone on 1 May and expected North Korea to take the same action. This commitment was fulfilled as planned and both sides committed to ending their balloon propaganda campaigns as well. On 5 May, an attempt by North Korean defectors to continue the balloon campaign across the border from South Korea was halted by the South Korean government. Also on 5 May, North Korea changed its time zone so that it would match South Korea's. At the same time, the Ministry of Unification also asked social activists in the country who are concerned about North Korea to suspend the distribution of political propaganda leaflets to the country.

In addition, in order to realize the joint team to participate in the 2018 Asian Games as stated in the declaration, the South Korean Ministry of Culture, Sports and Tourism would start preparations and discuss specific methods to implement this. During the 2018 World Team Table Tennis Championships, the table tennis teams from the two Koreas entered separately, but when they were paired against each other at the quarter-final of the women's event, they negotiated instead to field a joint team for the semifinal, with the agreement of the International Table Tennis Federation. On 3 May, in the women's team competition of the 2018 World Table Tennis Team Championships, the North Korean and South Korean teams, who were originally scheduled to face each other in the semifinals, announced that they would merge to form the "Korean-North Korean Joint Team". Both teams advanced to the next round of the competition together. In the end, the joint team lost to Japan in the semifinals. Since there was no bronze medal match in the competition, the joint team won the bronze medal. This was the first time in six years that South Korea had won a medal in this competition. A week later, the Korean Table Tennis Association stated that South Korea intended to accept North Korea's invitation to participate in the Pyongyang International Table Tennis Invitational Tournament, which was to be held on 13 May.

On the other hand, after the talks, the North Korean government launched a series of political propaganda campaigns. The secretary of the Workers' Party of Korea gave speeches and propaganda to government agencies, factories and schools, telling the people that "this meeting is a great achievement in the history of the nation" and that "the supreme leader worked hard for several days and nights to achieve victory", so he called on the people to "work harder to repay the debt". On 9 May, the Korean Central News Agency published an editorial, saying that the talks were the result of the joint efforts of the North and the South, and that unification could only be achieved if the people of the Korean Peninsula were united. On 11 May, Rodong Sinmun said that the Panmunjom Declaration was a "great declaration" to eliminate the danger of war, ease tensions and bring peace and security. At the same time, in order to respond to the promise of denuclearization and to create a friendly atmosphere for the upcoming North Korea-US talks, the Ministry of Foreign Affairs announced on 12 Nay that it would dismantle the Punggye-ri Nuclear Test Site from 23 to 25 May and would invite journalists from China, Russia, the United States, the United Kingdom and South Korea to cover the event on site. Finally, North Korea demolished the nuclear test site by explosion on 24 May. Two days later, the leaders of North and South Korea held another meeting at the Tongil Pavilion in Panmunjom. The Inter-Korean Liaison Office was established on 14 September. In response to the autumn promise, the leaders of the two countries said they will hold their third meeting of the year from 19 to 21 September.

In addition, the talks also boosted Moon Jae-in’s approval rating. South Korea’s two major polling organizations, Gallup Korea and Current Survey, release the president’s approval rating every week. Before the talks, his approval rating was around 65%-70%. After the talks, his approval rating rose to 83%, and the approval rating of his Democratic Party also rose to 55%, a new high since the party’s founding.

=== May 2018 summit ===
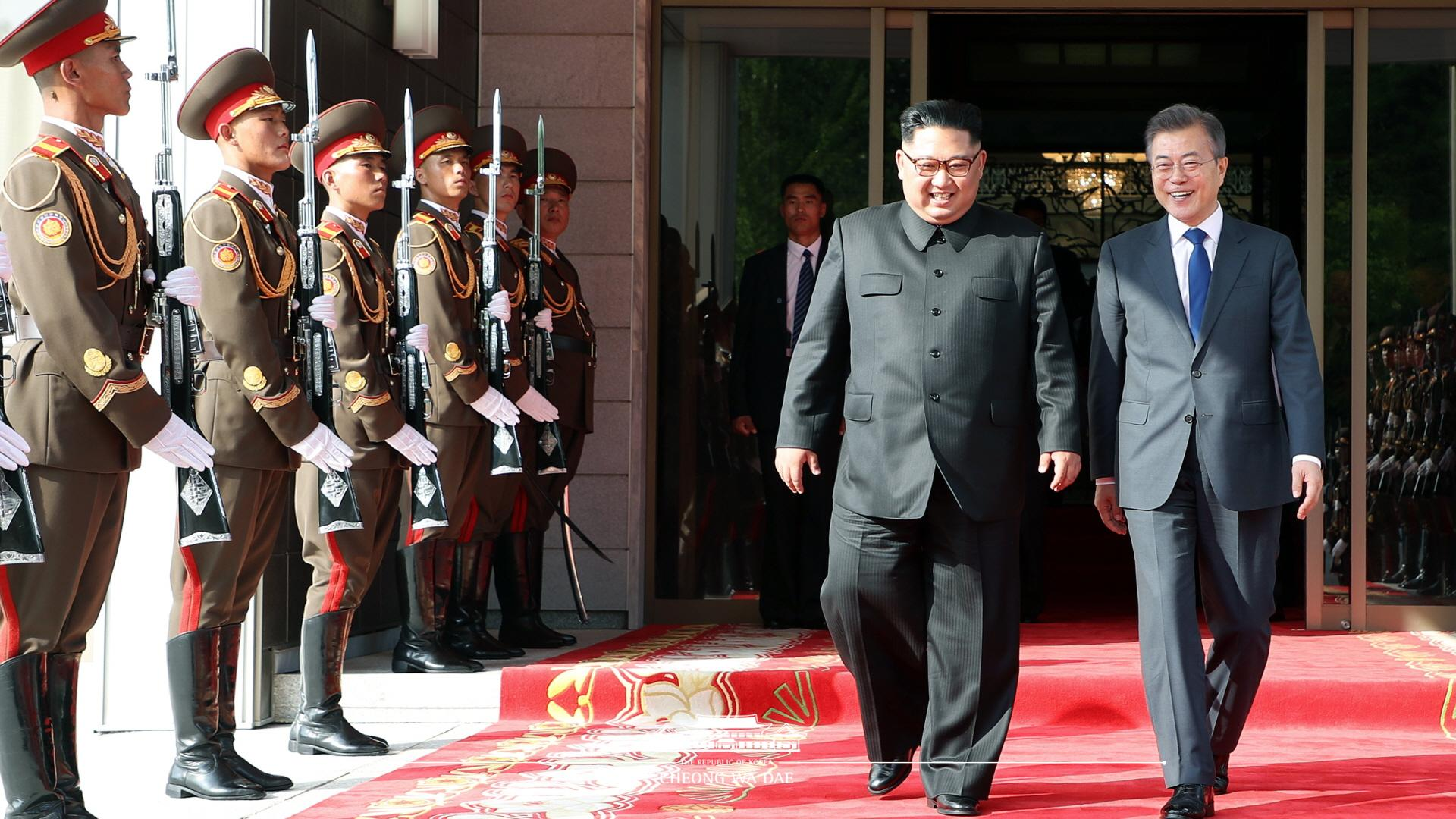
Kim and Moon at the May 2018 Summit on the North Korean side of Panmunjom

On 26 May, Kim and Moon met again in the Joint Security Area, this time on the North Korean side of the Panmunjom village. The meeting took two hours, and unlike other summits it was not publicly announced beforehand. Photos released by South Korea's presidential office showed Moon arriving at the northern side of the Panmunjom truce village and shaking hands with Kim's sister, Kim Yo Jong, before sitting down with Kim for their summit. Moon was accompanied by his spy chief, Suh Hoon, while Kim was joined by Kim Yong-chol, a former military intelligence chief who was now a vice chairman of the North Korean ruling party's central committee tasked with inter-Korean relations. The meeting was largely centered around Kim Jong Un's upcoming summit with U.S. President Donald Trump. Kim and Moon also embraced before Moon returned to South Korea. Moon revealed details of the summit in a public address on 27 May.

=== September 2018 summit ===
On 13 August, it was announced that a third 2018 inter-Korean summit would be held in the North Korean capital of Pyongyang on an unspecified day in September. The meeting was designed to capitalize on what was accomplished at the previous two summits. Ri Son Gwon, the head of the North Korean delegation, told reporters that a specific date for the summit was already set, but that they wanted to "keep reporters wondering." It was announced on 31 August that South Korean President Moon Jae-In would send a special delegation to North Korea on 5 September to hold more nuclear talks and set up the summit. The summit lasted three days, from 18 September to 20 September.

== See also ==
- Inter-Korean summits
- 2018 North Korea–United States Singapore Summit
- North Korea–South Korea relations
- Korean reunification
- Northern Limit Line
- 2017–18 North Korea crisis
- Inter-Korean House of Freedom
- List of international trips made by Kim Jong Un
- Kim–Xi meetings
