= Mokpo (constituency) =

Constituency in South Jeolla, South Korea

- Single-member constituency for the National Assembly
- Location of the constituency
- District(s): Mokpo
- Region: South Jeolla
- Electorate: 189,615 (2020)

Current constituency
- Created: 2000
- Seats: 1
- Party: Democratic Party
- Member: Kim Won-i
- Created from: Mokpo–Sinan A Mokpo–Sinan B

Mokpo (Korean: 목포시) is a constituency of the National Assembly of South Korea. The constituency consists of the entirety of Mokpo city. As of 2020, 189,615 eligible voters were registered in the constituency. The constituency was created in 2000 from the Mokpo–Sinan A and Mokpo–Sinan B constituencies.

== History ==
Mokpo, like most other constituencies located in the Honam region, is considered a stronghold for the liberal Democratic Party. The area has consistently voted for the Democratic Party, its predecessor parties, and affiliated independents; the only exception being the 2016 South Korean legislative election where influential politicians from Honam left the New Politics Alliance for Democracy and joined the People Party led by Ahn Cheol-soo.

Kim Hong-il, the eldest son of President Kim Dae-jung, was the first member to represent the constituency as a member of the liberal Millennium Democratic Party. He won the election in a landslide against Bae Jong-deok of the conservative Grand National Party, securing 91.79% of the vote. He was succeeded by Lee Sang-yul of the Millennium Democratic Party who won with 50.9% of the vote in the 2004 legislative election. Lee planned to run as an independent in the 2008 election, but resigned as a candidate after declaring his support for Jeong Young-sik of the United Democratic Party. In the general election, independent Park Jie-won, who served as the Chief of Staff to President Kim Dae-jung, won with 53.59% of the vote. Park successfully won re-election in 2012 and 2016, winning 71.17% and 56.38% of the vote respectively. However, he was defeated in the 2020 election by Kim Won-i of the Democratic Party.

== Boundaries ==
The constituency encompasses the entire of Mokpo city. It is bordered by the constituency of Yeongam–Muan–Sinan to the north, east, and west and Haenam–Wando–Jindo to the south.

== List of members of the National Assembly ==
Election	Member	Party	Dates	Notes
2000	Kim Hong-il	Millennium Democratic	2000–2004	Eldest son of President Kim Dae-jung
2004	Lee Sang-yul	Millennium Democratic	2004–2008	
2008	Park Jie-won	Independent	2008–2020	Senior Secretary to Public Relations & Spokesperson of the Office of the President (1998–1999) Minister of Culture, Sports and Tourism (1999–2000); Senior Secretary to Policy Planning (2001); Chief of Staff to the President (2002–2003); Floor leader of the Democratic Party (2010–2011); Floor leader of the Democratic United Party (2012); Floor leader of the People's Party (2016); Leader of the People's Party (2017); Director of the National Intelligence Service (2020–2022)
2012	Park Jie-won	Democratic United	2008–2020	Senior Secretary to Public Relations & Spokesperson of the Office of the President (1998–1999) Minister of Culture, Sports and Tourism (1999–2000); Senior Secretary to Policy Planning (2001); Chief of Staff to the President (2002–2003); Floor leader of the Democratic Party (2010–2011); Floor leader of the Democratic United Party (2012); Floor leader of the People's Party (2016); Leader of the People's Party (2017); Director of the National Intelligence Service (2020–2022)
2016	Park Jie-won	People	2008–2020	Senior Secretary to Public Relations & Spokesperson of the Office of the President (1998–1999) Minister of Culture, Sports and Tourism (1999–2000); Senior Secretary to Policy Planning (2001); Chief of Staff to the President (2002–2003); Floor leader of the Democratic Party (2010–2011); Floor leader of the Democratic United Party (2012); Floor leader of the People's Party (2016); Leader of the People's Party (2017); Director of the National Intelligence Service (2020–2022)
2020	Kim Won-i	Democratic	2020–present	Chief Secretary to the Mayor of Eunpyeong; Aide State Affairs of Mayor of Seoul; Senior Secretary for Political Affairs of Mayor of Seoul; Aide State Affairs Minister of Education (2018–2019); Deputy Mayor of Seoul (2019)
2024	Kim Won-i	Democratic	2020–present	Chief Secretary to the Mayor of Eunpyeong; Aide State Affairs of Mayor of Seoul; Senior Secretary for Political Affairs of Mayor of Seoul; Aide State Affairs Minister of Education (2018–2019); Deputy Mayor of Seoul (2019)

== Election results ==
=== 2024 ===
Legislative Election 2024: Mokpo
Party	Candidate	Votes	%	±%
Democratic	Kim Won-i	82,700	71.43	▲22.67
Independent	Lee Yoon-seok	15,811	13.65	new
People Power	Yoon Seon-woong	6,393	5.52	▲3.52
PTP	Choi Dae-zip	4,647	4.01	new
Progressive	Choi Kuk-jin	3,546	3.06	new
Green Justice	Park Myung-ki	2,677	2.31	▼9.57
Rejected ballots		2,001	–	
Turnout		117,775	64.91	▼2.96
Registered electors		181,418		
Democratic hold		Swing		

=== 2020 ===
Legislative Election 2020: Mokpo
Party	Candidate	Votes	%	±%
Democratic	Kim Won-i	62,065	48.76	▲28.5
Minsaeng	Park Jie-won	47,258	37.34	▼19.04
Justice	Yun So-ha	15,122	11.88	▲6.43
United Future	Hwang Gyu-won	2,554	2.00	▼4.54
Rejected ballots		1,419	–	
Turnout		128,688	67.87	▲11.84
Registered electors		189,615		
Democratic gain from Minsaeng		Swing		

=== 2016 ===
Legislative Election 2016: Mokpo
Party	Candidate	Votes	%	±%
People	Park Jie-won	58,630	56.38	new
Democratic	Cho Sang-ki	21,078	20.26	▼50.91
Independent	Yoo Seon-ho	8,655	8.32	new
Saenuri	Park Seok-man	6,804	6.54	new
Justice	Moon Bo-hyeon	5,670	5.45	new
People's United	Kim Hwan-seok	1,760	1.69	new
Independent	Kim Han-chang	721	0.69	new
Independent	Song Tae-hwa	672	0.64	new
Rejected ballots		1,068	–	
Turnout		105,058	56.03	▼1.47
Registered electors		187,494		
People hold		Swing		

=== 2012 ===
Legislative Election 2012: Mokpo
Party	Candidate	Votes	%	±%
Democratic United	Park Jie-won	63,705	71.17	▲17.58
Unified Progressive	Yun So-ha	14,587	15.45	▲9.91
Independent	Bae Jong-ho	10,685	11.93	new
Democratic Reunification	Chung Il-yong	524	0.58	new
Rejected ballots		915	–	
Turnout		90,416	48.75	▼0.02
Registered electors		185,469		
Democratic United hold		Swing		

=== 2008 ===
Legislative Election 2008: Mokpo
Party	Candidate	Votes	%	±%
Independent	Park Jie-won	45,415	53.59	new
United Democratic	Jeong Young-sik	32,271	38.08	new
Democratic Labor	Yun So-ha	4,695	5.54	▲0.73
Grand National	Chun Sung-bok	1,802	2.13	new
Family Party for Peace and Unity	Choi Seung-kyu	565	0.67	new
Rejected ballots		2,706	–	
Turnout		87,454	48.77	▼7.89
Registered electors		179,322		
Independent gain from Independent		Swing		

=== 2004 ===
Legislative Election 2004: Mokpo
Party	Candidate	Votes	%	±%
Millennium Democratic	Lee Sang-yul	48,745	50.90	▼40.89
Uri	Kim Dae-jung	38,832	40.55	new
Democratic Labor	Choi Song-chun	4,605	4.81	new
Independent	Bae Jong-deok	3,593	3.75	▼4.46
Rejected ballots		1,179	–	
Turnout		96,954	56.66	▼1.62
Registered electors		171,129		
Millennium Democratic hold		Swing		

=== 2000 ===
Legislative Election 2000: Mokpo
Party	Candidate	Votes	%	±%
Millennium Democratic	Kim Hong-il	87,354	91.79	–
Grand National	Bae Jong-deok	7,828	8.21	–
Rejected ballots		1,543	–	
Turnout		96,715	58.28	–
Registered electors		165,956		
Millennium Democratic win (new seat)				

== See also ==
- List of constituencies of the National Assembly of South Korea
