= Chung Eui-yong =

South Korean politician (born 1946)

- 정의용
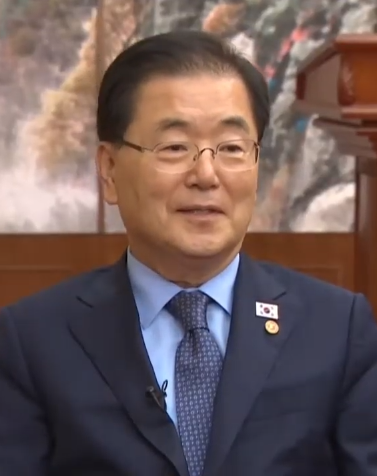
- Chung in 2018

37th Minister of Foreign Affairs
- In office February 9, 2021 – May 12, 2022
- President: Moon Jae-in
- Prime Minister: Chung Sye-kyun; Kim Boo-kyum
- Preceded by: Kang Kyung-wha
- Succeeded by: Park Jin

Special Advisor to the President on Foreign Affairs, Diplomacy and National Security
- In office July 3, 2020 – January 20, 2021
- President: Moon Jae-in
- Succeeded by: Kim Hyun-jong

Director of the National Security Office
- In office May 20, 2017 – July 2, 2020
- President: Moon Jae-in
- Preceded by: Kim Kwan-jin
- Succeeded by: Suh Hoon

Personal details
- Born: April 14, 1946 (age 80)
- Education: Seoul National University; Harvard University

Korean name
- Hangul: 정의용
- Hanja: 鄭義溶
- RR: Jeong Uiyong
- MR: Chŏng Ŭiyong

Chung Eui-yong (Korean: 정의용; born April 14, 1946) is a South Korean diplomat and a politician who served as Minister of Foreign Affairs from 2021 to 2022. Chung was previously President Moon Jae-in's first Director of National Security from 2017 to 2020.

== Career ==
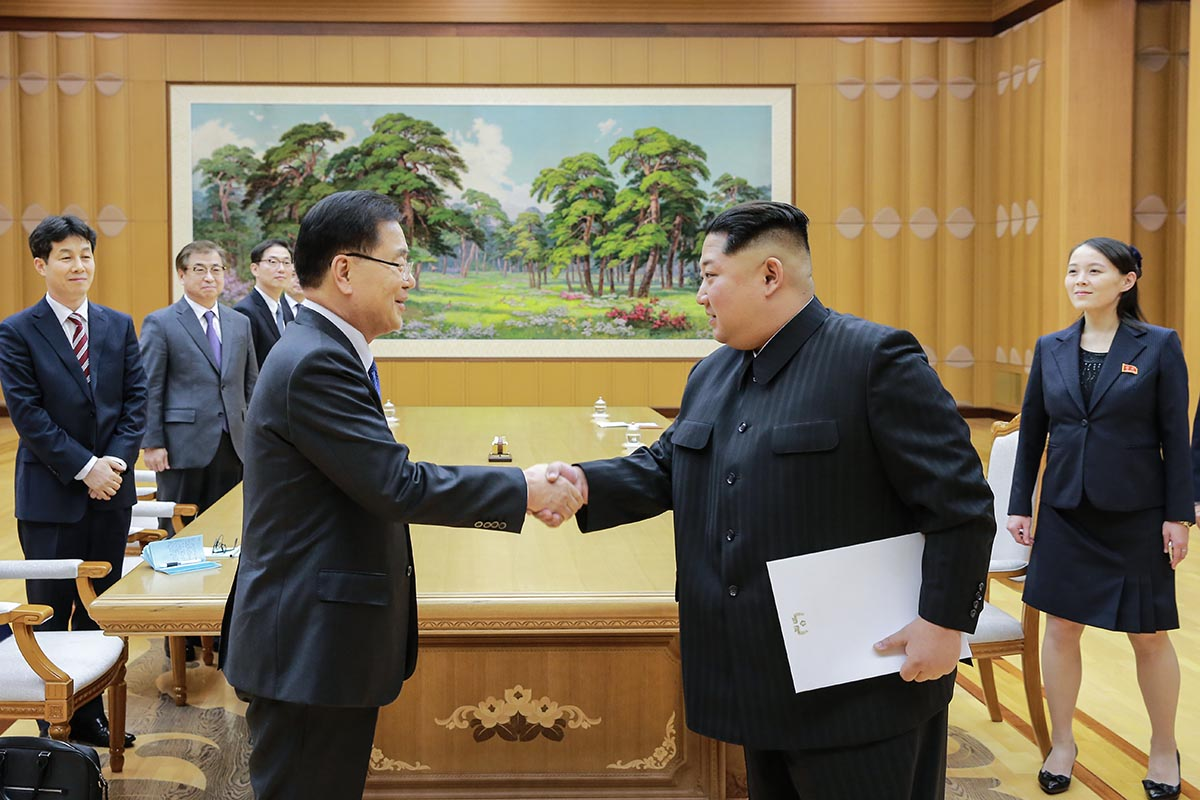
Chung Eui-yong (left) and Kim Jong Un

A 1968 graduate of Seoul National University, Chung joined the Ministry of Foreign Affairs in 1971. He subsequently served as Korean Ambassador to Israel (1997–1998), Deputy Minister for Trade (1998–2001), and as Korean Ambassador to the Permanent Mission of the Republic of Korea to the UN Secretariat and International Organizations in Geneva (2001–2004). He was returned to the 17th National Assembly in the 2004 elections as a proportional representative for the Uri Party. In the National Assembly, he was a member of the Special Committee on United States–Korea Free Trade Agreement. He then became Secretary-General of the International Conference of Asian Political Parties. On May 20, 2017, newly-inaugurated president Moon Jae-in appointed him as the ministerial-level Director of the National Security Office. In July 2020, Chung was replaced by Suh Hoon and reshuffled to President Moon's Special Advisor on Foreign Affairs, Diplomacy and National Security. In January 2021, he replaced Kang Kyung-hwa as the new South Korean Foreign Minister.

== Political activity ==
In March 2018, as South Korea's Special Envoy to North Korea, Chung Eui-yong visited Pyongyang to discuss the required steps to denuclearise North Korea. He then flew to the United States for a meeting with President Donald Trump and to announce the Trump-Kim summit.

On November 4, 2019, at a waiting room on the sidelines of the ASEAN Plus 3 (Japan, China, and South Korea) summit held near Bangkok, when Japanese Prime Minister Shinzo Abe talked with South Korean President Moon Jae-in for 11 minutes, Chung Eui-yong took photos, and they were published without the approval of the Japanese side.

Chung had been in charge of bilateral intelligence-sharing agreement, the General Security of Military Information Agreement (GSOMIA), with Japan.

== Conviction ==
On February 19, 2025, Chung was sentenced to a suspended prison term of ten months by the Seoul Central District Court for abuse of power involving the forced repatriation of two North Korean fishermen who had killed 16 of their colleagues in the East Sea in 2019.

== Election results ==
Year	Elections	Constituency	Political party	Votes (%)	Results
2004	17th National Assembly General Election	Proportional representation (10th)	Uri	8,145,824 (38.26%)	Elected

== See also ==
- 2018 North Korea–United States Singapore Summit
- April 2018 inter-Korean summit
- 2017–18 North Korea crisis
- List of current foreign ministers
- List of foreign ministers in 2021

Political offices
Preceded by Kim Kwan-jin	Director of National Security Office; 2017–2020	Succeeded by Suh Hoon
Preceded by Kang Kyung-wha	Minister of Foreign Affairs; 2021–2022	Succeeded by Park Jin
