= X-file scandal =

2005 South Korean political scandal

The X-file scandal was a South Korean political scandal in 2005. The scandal revolved around the release of wiretapped conversations to the media. Many of the conversations were of conservative politicians in the Grand National Party arranging bribes during the South Korean presidential election of 1997. The tapes were made illegally. The scandal looked at the general role of the National Intelligence Service (NIS) in political and personal affairs.

In July, 2005, South Korean police raided the home of NIS intelligence operative Kong Un-young, retrieving 274 tapes. Kong attempted suicide, but was unsuccessful. Because of this evidence of NIS involvement, some Grand National Party leaders claimed that the administration of Roh Moo-hyun must have been aware of the wiretaps. However, members of the pro-government Uri Party claimed that GNP leaders were also aware of them.

== See also ==
- Politics of South Korea
- NIS illegal wiretapping scandal
