= National Security Council (South Korea) =

South Korean governmental body

- 국가안전보장회의

Agency overview
- Formed: 17 December 1963
- Headquarters: Presidential residence, Seoul
- Agency executives: Lee Jae-myung, President of the Republic of Korea; Wi Sung-lac, Standing Committee Chairperson - Director of National Security Office; Kim Tae-hyo, Executive Secretary - 1st Deputy Director.; Lim Sang-beom, National Security Office Security Strategy Secretary
- Parent agency: President of South Korea

Korean name
- Hangul: 국가안전보장회의
- Hanja: 國家安全保障會議
- RR: Gukga anjeon bojang hoeui
- MR: Kukka anjŏn pojang hoeŭi

National Security Council (Korean: 국가안전보장회의) is an advisory body to the President of South Korea on foreign, military and domestic policies related to national security.

== Membership ==
Structure of the National Security Council
Chairperson	President
Statutory Attendees	Prime Minister; Minister of Foreign Affairs; Minister of Unification; Minister of National Defense; Director of National Intelligence Service
Regular Attendees	Minister of the Interior and Safety; Chief of Staff to the President; Director of the Office of National Security; 1st Deputy Director of the Office of National Security; 2nd Deputy Director of the Office of National Security
Additional Participants	Personnel appointed by the President
