= Park Jie-won =

South Korean politician (born 1942)

- 박지원
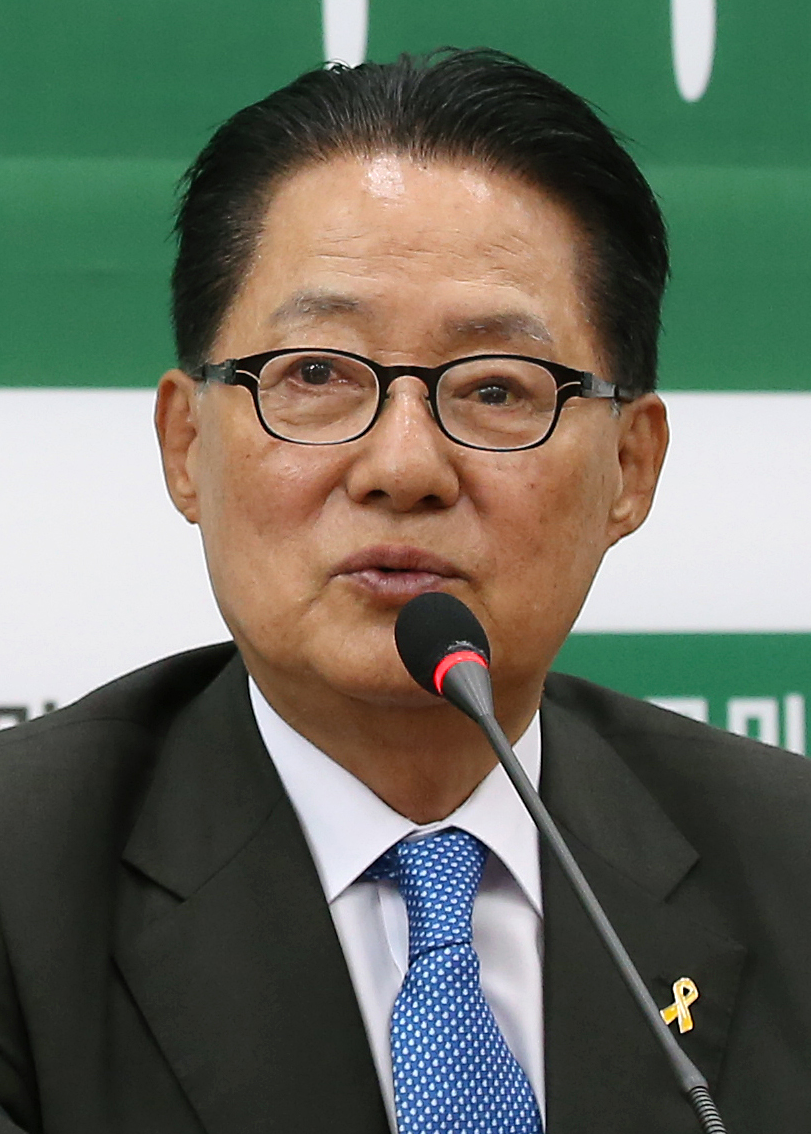
- Park in 2017

Director of the National Intelligence Service
- In office 29 July 2020 – 11 May 2022
- President: Moon Jae-in; Yoon Suk Yeol
- Preceded by: Suh Hoon
- Succeeded by: Kim Kyou-hyun

Floor Leader of the People's Party
- In office 30 May 2016 – 29 December 2016
- Preceded by: Joo Seung-yong
- Succeeded by: Joo Seung-yong

Leader of the People's Party
- In office 15 January 2017 – 10 May 2017
- Preceded by: Ahn Cheol-soo, Chun Jung-bae (co-leader) himself (interim); Kim Dong-cheol (interim)
- Succeeded by: Joo Seung-yong (acting); Park Joo-sun (interim); Ahn Cheol-soo
- In office 29 June 2016 – 5 December 2016 (Interim)
- Preceded by: Ahn Cheol-soo, Chun Jung-bae (co-leader)
- Succeeded by: Kim Dong-cheol (interim)

Member of the National Assembly
- Incumbent
- Assumed office 30 May 2024
- Preceded by: Yoon Jae-kab
- Constituency: Haenam–Wando–Jindo (South Jeolla)
- In office 30 May 2008 – 29 May 2020
- Preceded by: Lee Sang-yul
- Succeeded by: Kim Won-i
- Constituency: Mokpo (South Jeolla)
- In office 30 May 1992 – 31 August 1995
- Constituency: Proportional Representation

Chief Presidential Secretary
- In office 15 April 2002 – 24 February 2003
- President: Kim Dae-jung
- Preceded by: Jeon Yun-churl
- Succeeded by: Moon Hee-sang

Minister of Culture, Sports and Tourism
- In office 23 May 1999 – 19 September 2000
- President: Kim Dae-jung
- Preceded by: Shin Nak-gyun
- Succeeded by: Kim Han-gil

Personal details
- Born: 5 June 1942 (age 84) Jindo, Zenranan Province, Korea, Empire of Japan
- Party: Democratic Party of Korea (2022- )
- Other political affiliations: Independent (2020–2022); Minsaeng Party (2020); New Alternatives (2020); Democracy and Peace (2018–2019); People's (2016–2018); Independent (2016); Democratic (2015) (2015–2016); NPAD (2014–2015); Democratic (2013) (2013–2014); Democratic United Party (2011–2013); Democratic (2008) (2008–2011); Independent (2008); United Democratic (2008); GDNP (2008); Independent (2001–2003, 2004–2008); Millennium Democratic Party (MDP) (1998–1999, 2000–2001, 2003–2004); NCNP (1995–1998, 1999–2000); Democratic (1991) (1991–1995); NUDP (1991); PDP (1987–1991); Independent (1981–1987); DJP (1981)
- Education: Dankook University
- Website: www.jwp615.com

Korean name
- Hangul: 박지원
- Hanja: 朴智源
- RR: Bak Jiwon
- MR: Pak Chiwŏn

Park Jie-won (Korean: 박지원; born 5 June 1942) is a South Korean politician who served as Director of the National Intelligence Service. He was the chief presidential secretary to President Kim Dae-jung, and served as the Minister of Ministry of Culture, Sports and Tourism and coined the term "Esports" during his administration. On 9 April 2008, he was elected as a member of 18th National Assembly of South Korea for Mokpo as an independent. After being elected, he returned to the Democratic Party. In May 2012, he became the floor leader for the Democratic United Party.

In 2018, he declared that he would leave People's Party and joined the Party for Democracy and Peace.

== Early life and education ==
Park Jie-won attended Moontae High School in Mokpo and graduated in 1960. Park studied business in Dankook University and graduated in 1969. Park joined Lucky Goldstar (now LG) in 1970.

== Life in the United States ==
Park Jie-won immigrated to the United States in 1972, and became popular among the expat Korean community. He was elected to become the 16th President of the Korean American Association of Greater New York and subsequently became the 4th President of the Federation of Korean Associations, USA.

== Scandal ==
Park Jie-won was charged with abusing his power and violating domestic laws on foreign exchange trade and inter-Korean cooperation affairs while orchestrating covert money transfers by Hyundai to North Korea. He played a pivotal role in arranging the first Inter-Korean summit between South and North Korean leader in June 2000. Hyundai transferred $500 million to the North just months before the summit, triggering criticism that the South Korean Government paid for the summit. Hyundai claimed the money was a payment for exclusive business rights in electric power facilities, communication lines, an industrial park, cross-border roads and railway lines in North Korea.

In December 2003, he was sentenced to twelve years in prison for his role in the Cash-for-summit scandal, though he was subsequently acquitted of bribery by the Supreme Court of Korea. Park was subsequently indicted on charges of receiving bribes from several conglomerates, including SK Group, and sentenced to three years in prison in 2004. He temporarily released for medical treatment in November 2006, and was officially released in February 2007. He was later pardoned in December 2007, which enabled him to run for a legislative election in April 2008. He was defeated in the 2020 election and lost his seat.

== Director of the National Intelligence Service ==
On 3 July 2020, Park was nominated the Director of the National Intelligence Service. He was finally appointed to the position on 28 July. In December 2020, the Moon administration subsequently passed a reform bill to remove the NIS's involvement in domestic intelligence and activities and transferring of such powers to the National Police Agency. Park, on behalf of the NIS, proclaimed that the agency would never meddle in domestic politics again. He was accused of involvement in the coverup of the 2020 murder of a South Korean fisheries official by North Korean soldiers near the Northern Limit Line, but was acquitted in 2025.

== Election results ==
Year	Elections	Constituency	Political party	Votes (%)	Results
1992	14th National Assembly General Election	National (21st)	Democratic (1991)	6,004,578 (29.17%)	Elected
1996	15th National Assembly General Election	Bucheon Sosa (Gyeonggi)	NCNP	31,786 (37.25%)	Defeated (2nd)
2008	18th National Assembly General Election	Mokpo (South Jeolla)	Independent	45,415 (53.59%)	Won
2012	19th National Assembly General Election	Mokpo (South Jeolla)	DUP	63,705 (71.17%)	Won
2016	20th National Assembly General Election	Mokpo (South Jeolla)	People's	58,630 (56.38%)	Won
2020	21st National Assembly General Election	Mokpo (South Jeolla)	Minsaeng	47,528 (37.34%)	Defeated (2nd)
2024	22nd National Assembly General Election	Haenam–Wando–Jindo (South Jeolla)	Democratic (2015)	78,324 (92.35%)	Won

== See also ==
- Cash-for-summit scandal

Political offices
Preceded by Shin Nak-gyun	Minister of Culture, Sports and Tourism; 23 May 1999–19 September 2000	Succeeded by Kim Han-gil
Preceded by Jeon Yun-churl	Chief Presidential Secretary; 15 April 2002–24 February 2003	Succeeded by Moon Hee-sang
Preceded by Suh Hoon	Director of the National Intelligence Service; 29 July 2020–11 May 2022	Succeeded by Kim Kyou-hyun
National Assembly of the Republic of Korea
Preceded by	Member of the National Assembly from National (21st, Democratic Party); 30 May 1992–31 August 1995	Succeeded by
Preceded by Lee Sang-Yul	Member of the National Assembly from Mokpo (South Jeolla); 30 May 2008–29 May 2020	Succeeded by Kim Won-i
Preceded by Yoon Jae-kab	Member of the National Assembly from Haenam–Wando–Jindo (South Jeolla); 30 May 2024–	Incumbent
Party political offices
Preceded by Lee Kang-rae	Floor Leader of the Democratic Party; 30 May 2009–29 May 2010	Succeeded by Kim Jin-pyo
Preceded by Chung Sye-kyun	Interim Chairman of the Democratic Party; 3 August 2010–2 October 2010	Succeeded by Sohn Hak-kyu
Preceded by Kim Jin-pyo	Floor Leader of the Democratic United Party; 4 May 2012–21 December 2012	Succeeded by Park Ki-choon
Preceded by Moon Sung-keun (Acting)	Interim Chairman of the Democratic United Party; 4 May 2012–8 June 2012	Succeeded by Lee Hae-chan
Preceded by Joo Seung-ryong	Floor Leader of the People's Party; 27 April 2016–28 December 2016	Succeeded by Joo Seung-ryong
Preceded by Ahn Cheol-soo, Chun Jung-bae (Co-Leader)	Interim Leader of the People's Party; 29 June 2016–4 December 2016	Succeeded by Kim Dong-cheol (Interim)
Preceded by Ahn Cheol-soo, Chun Jung-bae (Co-Leader); Himself (Interim); Kim Dong-cheol (Interim	Leader of the People's Party; 15 January 2017–10 May 2017	Succeeded by Joo Seung-ryong (Acting); Park Joo-sun (Interim); Ahn Cheol-soo
