= Shin Kuhn =

South Korean lawyer and politician

- Hangul: 신건
- Hanja: 辛建
- RR: Sin Geon
- MR: Sin Kŏn

Shin Kuhn (Korean: 신건; 12 February 1941 – 24 November 2015) was a Korean lawyer and politician who was the 25th director of the National Intelligence Service of South Korea.

Preceded by Lim Dong-won	Director of the National Intelligence Service; 26 March 2001–24 April 2003	Succeeded by Ko Young-koo
