= List of directors of the National Intelligence Service (South Korea) and predecessor organizations =

This is a list of the current and past directors of the National Intelligence Service of South Korea and its predecessor organizations, the Korean Central Intelligence Agency and the Agency for National Security Planning.

Name	Hangul	Hanja	Tenure
Kim Jong-pil	김종필	金鍾泌	1961-05-20 - 1963-01-06
Kim Yong-soon	김용순	金容珣	1963-01-07 - 1963-02-20
Kim Jae-choon	김재춘	金在春	1963-02-21 - 1963-07-11
Kim Hyong-uk	김형욱	金炯旭	1963-07-12 - 1969-10-20
Kim Kye-won	김계원	金桂元	1969-10-21 - 1970-12-20
Lee Hu-rak	이후락	李厚洛	1970-12-21 - 1973-12-02
Shin Jik-soo	신직수	申稙秀	1973-12-03 - 1976-12-03
Kim Jae-kyu	김재규	金載圭	1976-12-04 - 1979-10-26
Lee Hee-sung	이희성	李熺性	1979-10-30 - 1979-12-12
Yoon Il-gyun	윤일균	尹鎰均	1979-12-13 - 1980-04-13
Chun Doo-hwan	전두환	全斗煥	1980-04-14 - 1980-07-17
Yoo Hak-sung	유학성	兪學聖	1980-07-18 - 1982-06-01
Lho Shin-yong	노신영	盧信永	1982-06-02 - 1985-02-18
Chang Se-dong	장세동	張世東	1985-02-19 - 1987-05-25
Ahn Moo-hyuk	안무혁	安武赫	1987-05-26 - 1988-05-06
Bae Myong-in	배명인	裵命仁	1988-05-07 - 1988-12-04
Park Seh-jik	박세직	朴世直	1988-12-05 - 1989-07-18
Suh Dong-kwon	서동권	徐東權	1989-07-19 - 1992-03-30
Lee Sang-yun	이상연	李相淵	1992-03-31 - 1992-10-08
Lee Hyun-Woo	이현우	李賢雨	1992-10-09 - 1993-02-25
Kim Deok	김덕	金悳	1993-02-26 - 1994-12-23
Kwon Young-hae	권영해	權寧海	1994-12-24 - 1998-03-04
Lee Jong-chan	이종찬	李鍾贊	1998-03-04 - 1999-05-25
Chun Yong-taek	천용택	千容宅	1999-05-26 - 1999-12-23
Lim Dong-won	임동원	林東源	1999-12-24 - 2001-03-26
Shin Kuhn	신건	辛建	2001-03-27 - 2003-04-24
Ko Young-koo	고영구	高榮九	2003-04-25 - 2005-07-11
Kim Seung-kew	김승규	金昇圭	2005-07-11 - 2006-11-23
Kim Man-bok	김만복	金萬福	2006-11-23 - 2008-02-29
Kim Sung-ho	김성호	金成浩	2008-03-26 - 2009-02-12
Won Sei-hoon	원세훈	元世勳	2009-02-12 - 2013-03-21
Nam Jae-joon	남재준	南在俊	2013-03-21 - 2014-05-21
Lee Byung-kee	이병기	李丙琪	2014-07-16 - 2015-03-01
Lee Byung-ho	이병호	李炳浩	2015-03-18 - 2017-05-10
Suh Hoon	서훈	徐薰	2017-05-10 - 2020-07-03
Park Jie-won	박지원	朴智源	2020-07-29 - 2022-05-11
Kim Kyou-hyun	김규현	金奎顯	2022-05-26 - 2023-11-26
Cho Tae-yong	조태용	趙太庸	2024-01-06 - 2025-06-04
Lee Jong-seok	이종석	李鍾奭	2025-06-25 - Present
