= Wi Sung-lac =

South Korean politician (born 1954)

- Wi in 2026

Director of National Security
- Incumbent
- Assumed office 5 June 2025
- President: Lee Jae Myung
- Prime Minister: Lee Ju-ho (acting); Kim Min-Seok; Han Seong-sook

Standing Chairman of the National Security Council
- Incumbent
- Assumed office 5 June 2025
- President: Lee Jae Myung
- Prime Minister: Lee Ju-ho (acting); Kim Min-Seok; Han Seong-sook

Member of the National Assembly
- In office 30 May 2024 – 5 June 2025
- Constituency: Proportional representation

Ambassador to Russia
- In office 2011–2015

Personal details
- Born: September 14, 1954 (age 72) Jangheung South Jeolla, South Korea
- Party: Democratic Party of Korea
- Education: Seoul National University; Russian Academy of Sciences

Wi Sung-lac (Korean: 위성락; born September 14, 1954) is a South Korean politician. Wi was the Ambassador to Russia and a member of the National Assembly. Wi is the Director of National Security.

== Biography ==
Wi was born on September 14, 1954 in Jangheung, South Korea. He gained a bachelor's and master's degrees in diplomacy from Seoul National University. Wi also obtained a Ph.D. from the Institute of World Economy and International Relations in the Russian Academy of Sciences.

After passing the Foreign Service Exam in 1979, Wi was the First Secretary at the Permanent Mission to Geneva from 1991 to 1993 and First Secretary at the Embassy of Korea in Russia from 1993 to 1996. From 1996 to 1997, Wi was the Director of the Eastern European Affairs Division at the Ministry of Foreign Affairs. From 1999 to 2002, Wi was the Counsellor at the Embassy of Korea in the United States and the Special Advisor to the Minister of Foreign Affairs from 2002 to 2003.

From 2003 to 2004, Wi was the Director-General for North American Affairs at the Ministry of Foreign Affairs and Trade. In 2004, Wi was the Director for Policy Coordination at the Policy Coordination Office of the National Security Council. In 2009, Wi became the Chief Negotiator for Korean Peninsula Peace and Security Affairs at the Ministry of Foreign Affairs. In 2026, Wi became the chairman of the Democratic Party of Korea's Northeast Asia special committee.

From 2011 to 2015, Wi was the ambassador to Russia. Wi was elected to the National Assembly in 2024. During his time in the National Assembly, Wi was a member of the Foreign Affairs and Unification Committee and the Intelligence Committee. Wi became the Director of National Security and Standing Chairman of the National Security Council in June 2025.

== Election results ==
Year	Elections	Constituency	Political party	Votes (%)	Results
2024	22nd National Assembly General Election	Proportional representation (2nd)	Democratic Alliance of Korea	7,567,459 (26.69%)	Elected
