= Yun So-ha =

South Korean politician (born 1961)

- 윤소하
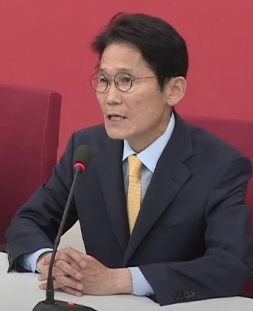

Member of the National Assembly
- In office 30 May 2016 – 30 May 2020
- Constituency: Proportional representation

Floor Leader of the Justice Party
- In office 21 August 2018 – 30 May 2020
- Preceded by: Roh Hoe-chan
- Succeeded by: Bae Jin-gyo

Personal details
- Born: September 10, 1961 (age 65) Okcheon-myeon, Haenam County, South Jeolla Province, South Korea
- Party: Democratic Party of Korea (2025–)
- Other political affiliations: Independent (2024–2025); Justice Party (2012–2024); Unified Progressive Party (2011–2012); Democratic Labor Party (before 2011)
- Education: University of Mokpo

Yun So-ha also written as Youn So-ha (Korean: 윤소하; Hanja: 尹昭夏; born 10 September 1961) is a South Korean politician. He was a member of the National Assembly and served as the Floor Leader of the Justice Party.

== Early life and education ==
Yun was born in Okcheon-myeon, Haenam County, South Jeolla Province, South Korea in 1961. He graduated from the University of Mokpo; majoring in business administration. As a university student, he attempted to help citizens of Gwangju during the Gwangju Uprising.

== Activism ==
Yun joined the Mokpo Youth Union in 1985; a social movement that advocated for an end to the regime of Chun Doo-hwan.

In 1986, Yun was sent to prison after he protested against the School Stabilization Law which was a proposed law by Chun Doo-hwan to punish students that protested against his regime. After being released from prison in 1987, Yun took part in the June Struggle.

== Election results ==
Year	Elections	Constituency	Political party	Votes (%)	Results
2008	18th National Assembly General Election	Mokpo (South Jeolla)	DLP	4,695 (5.53%)	Defeated (3rd)
2012	19th National Assembly General Election	Mokpo (South Jeolla)	UPP	14,587 (16.29%)	Defeated (2nd)
2016	20th National Assembly General Election	Proportional representation (4th)	Justice	1,719,891 (7.23%)	Elected
2020	21st National Assembly General Election	Mokpo (South Jeolla)	Justice	15,122 (11.88%)	Defeated (3rd)

== Political career ==
In 2008, Yun ran for representative of Mokpo under the Democratic Labor Party, he came in third place.

In 2012, he once again ran for representative of Mokpo, he came in second place.

Due to proportional representation, Yun became a member of the National Assembly in 2016. He plans to run for representative of Mokpo in the upcoming 2020 South Korean legislative election.

Due to death of Roh Hoe-chan in 2018, Yun assumed the position of acting Floor Leader of the Justice Party. He was officially elected by party members on August 21, 2018.

On 22 January 2025, he, alongside Choo Hye-seon and Bae Jin-gyo, joined the Democratic Party.
