= Hyundai Asan =

Arm of the Hyundai Group conglomerate

- Company logo

Korean name
- Hangul: 현대아산
- Hanja: 現代峨山
- RR: Hyeondae Asan
- MR: Hyŏndae Asan

Hyundai Asan (Korean: 현대아산) is an arm of the South Korean conglomerate Hyundai Group and a major investor in North Korea. The company managed a number of projects, including the resort at the Mount Kumgang Tourist Region and road/rail building operations. It was also involved in the Kaesong Industrial Park project.

== Hyundai split ==
The family-controlled Hyundai Group, which used to be South Korea's largest Chaebol, was split into three sub-groups after the Asian financial crisis. Chung Mong-hun was involved in a power struggle with his elder brother, Chung Mong-koo, who heads another part of the Hyundai Group, the automaker Hyundai Motor Company.

== Accusations of corruption ==
Hyundai Asan has faced accusations of being a vehicle for illegally transferring US$100 million to North Korea from the government of former South Korean President Kim Dae-jung. The money was supposedly used to persuade North Korean leader Kim Jong Il to attend the inter-Korean summit in 2000. Hyundai Asan is building an industrial park, cross-border roads and railway lines in North Korea. The delay of the projects, due to political difficulties, put severe financial strains on the company. The head of Hyundai Asan, Chung Mong-hun, faced corruption and embezzlement charges. Chung was tried on charges of manipulating company accounting records to hide the secret transfers and embezzling more than twelve million dollars of company funds to pay bribes. On August 4, 2003, he committed suicide by leaping from his 12th floor office.

== Kaesong Industrial Park ==
Hyundai Asan was hired by North Korea to develop the land for Kaesong Industrial Park close to the border with South Korea in the early 2000s. With this Industrial Park, a total of 124 firms took advantage of low-cost labor available in the North employing around 54,000 people from DPRK to compete with China to create low-end goods such as shoes, clothes, and watches before its abrupt closure in February 2016.

== See also ==
- Division of Korea
- Economy of North Korea
- Hyundai Group
- Chaebol
- North-South presidential summit corruption allegations
- Chung Ju-yung
