= Cash-for-summit scandal =

Korean political scandal

- Hangul: 대북 송금 사건
- Lit.: North Korea remittance incident
- RR: daebuk songgeum sageon
- MR: taebuk songgŭm sakŏn

Cash-for-summit (Korean: 대북 송금 사건) is the name of a political scandal that broke in South Korea in February 2003 and revolved around the secret payment by the Kim Dae-jung administration to North Korea of USD500 million to secure the landmark June 2000 North–South summit between the two Koreas.

The payment, worth USD500 million, was criticized by right wing groups of South Korea in particular. Some of them claimed that Kim Dae-jung had "bought" his 2000 Nobel Peace Prize that he received following the diplomatically successful summit. According to scholar Andrei Lankov, these accusations have a "kernel of truth", since Kim was known for never missing an opportunity to promote his lifelong political career.

Hyundai claimed the money was a payment for exclusive business rights in electric power facilities, communication lines, an industrial park, cross-border roads and railway lines in North Korea. It transferred $500 million to the North just months before the summit, triggering criticism that the South Korean Government paid for the summit. Following this, Park Jie-won, the chief presidential secretary, was charged with violating domestic laws on foreign exchange trade and inter-Korean cooperation affairs while orchestrating covert money transfers by Hyundai to North Korea. Park played a pivotal role in arranging the first Inter-Korean summit between South and North Korean leader in June 2000. In December 2003, Park was sentenced to twelve years in prison; the Korean Supreme Court later acquitted him of bribery in 2004.

Kim Dae-jung had been nominated for the Nobel Peace Prize every year from 1987 to 2000. His nominations were in recognition of his work towards the Inter-Korean summit, and his lifelong commitment to democracy. The Nobel Committee decided to award the 2000 Nobel Peace Prize to Kim for his work to preserve democracy and human rights in formerly authoritarian South Korea and East Asia, and for his efforts to establish peace and reconciliation with North Korea and Japan. Additionally, his diplomatic activities in campaigning against repression in East Timor in 1999 were considered.

== See also ==
- Chaebol
- Division of Korea
- Workers' Party of Korea
- Korean reunification
- Political corruption
- Uri Party
