= National Intelligence Service (South Korea) =

Intelligence agency of South Korea

- 국가정보원

Agency overview
- Formed: 13 June 1961; 65 years ago
- Preceding agencies: Korea Central Intelligence Agency (1961–1981); Agency for National Security Planning (1981–1999)
- Type: Independent
- Jurisdiction: Government of South Korea
- Headquarters: Naegok-dong, Seocho District, Seoul
- Motto: "Intelligence is National Power"
- Employees: Classified
- Annual budget: Classified
- Minister responsible: Lee Jong-seok, Director of the National Intelligence
- Agency executives: Lee Dong-su, 1st Deputy Director (Overseas Intelligence, Counterintelligence & Counterterrorism Operations); Hwang Won-jin, 2nd Deputy Director (North Korea Intelligence & Counterintelligence Operations); Kim Ho-hong, 3rd Deputy Director (Cyber Security and Science & Technology); Kim Hee-soo, Vice Director for Planning and Coordination Office (Organization Management & Budget)
- Website: eng.nis.go.kr

Korean name
- Hangul: 국가정보원
- Hanja: 國家情報院
- RR: Gukga jeongbowon
- MR: Kukka chŏngbowŏn

Short name
- Hangul: 국정원
- Hanja: 國情院
- RR: Gukjeongwon
- MR: Kukchŏngwŏn

The National Intelligence Service (NIS; Korean: 국가정보원, 국정원) is the chief intelligence agency of South Korea. The agency was officially established in 1961 as the Korean Central Intelligence Agency (KCIA; Korean: 중앙정보부; Hanja: 中央情報部; RR: Jungangjeongbobu; MR: Chungangjŏngbobu), during the rule of general Park Chung Hee's military Supreme Council for National Reconstruction, which displaced the Second Republic of Korea. The original duties of the KCIA were to "supervise and coordinate both international and domestic intelligence activities and criminal investigation by all government intelligence agencies, including that of the military." The agency's broad powers allowed it to actively intervene in politics. Agents undergo years of training and checks before they are officially inducted and receive their first assignments.

The agency took on the name Agency for National Security Planning (ANSP; Korean: 국가안전기획부, 안기부; Hanja: 國家安全企劃部, 安企部) in 1981, as part of a series of reforms instituted by the Fifth Republic of Korea under President Chun Doo-hwan. Besides trying to acquire intelligence on North Korea and suppress South Korean activists, the ANSP, like its predecessor, was heavily involved in activities outside its sphere, including domestic politics and promoting the 1988 Summer Olympics. During its existence, the ANSP engaged in numerous cases of human rights abuse such as torture, as well as election tampering.

In 1999, the agency assumed its current name. The more democratic and current Sixth Republic of Korea has seen a significant reduction in the role of the NIS in response to public criticisms about past abuses.

Most specifics regarding the agency's organizational makeup remain classified by the Seoul government. A 1998 investigation by the Sisa Journal into the structure of the agency (then the ANSP) estimated that it employed some 60,000 employees across 39 headquarters and regionally-based departments, spending an estimated 700–800 billion South Korean won per year.

== History ==
=== Korean Central Intelligence Agency ===
KCIA flag / Logo (until 1981)

The agency's origins can be traced back to the Korean Counterintelligence Corps (KCIC), formed during the Korean War. The KCIA was founded on 13 June 1961 by Kim Jong-pil, who drew much of the organization's initial 3,000-strong membership from the KCIC. Kim, a Korean Military Academy graduate and nephew of Park Chung Hee by marriage, is also credited with masterminding the 1961 coup d'État that installed Park before he was elected president of Korea.

President Park's government extensively used the intelligence service to suppress and disrupt anti-government or pro–North Korean or other pro-communist movements, including the widespread student protests on university campuses and the activities of overseas Koreans. The KCIA developed a reputation for interfering in domestic politics and international affairs beyond its jurisdiction. The KCIA's original charter, the Act Concerning Protection of Military Secrets, was designed to oversee the coordination of activities related to counterespionage and national security, but a majority of its activities and budget were devoted to things unrelated to its original charter.

In 1968, KCIA agents kidnapped 17 Koreans living in West Germany. They were transported back to Seoul, where they were tortured and brought up on charges of having violated the National Security Law by engaging in pro-Northern activities. The victims became a cause célèbre as the kidnapping created a firestorm of international criticism that almost brought the West German government to break off diplomatic relations with South Korea. It further served as a harbinger when the much-publicised kidnapping of a dissident, Kim Dae-jung—who would later become the president of Korea and the country's first Nobel Peace Prize recipient, in 2000—took place in 1973 off the coast of a Japanese resort town.

The KCIA's virtually unlimited and completely unchecked power to arrest and detain any person on any charge created a climate of extreme fear and repression. The frequent detention and torture of students, dissidents, opposition figures, communists, reporters, or anyone perceived to be critical of the government was symptomatic of the Park presidency and the subsequent administration. In another departure from its original charter, the KCIA's assumptive role as political machine extraordinaire and domination of the country's political life began to take on even more bizarre forms such as exercising a free hand in drafting the South Korean constitution and acting as a political fundraiser for the incumbent party.

In addition to its presumptive intelligence and secret police role, which was ostensibly authorized by its original charter, it also became, by default, through a network of agents at home and abroad, the de facto attorney general and inspector general of the South Korean government. Domestically, the KCIA made itself the philanthropical arm of the government by being an avid supporter of the arts, promoter of tourism, and purveyor of national culture.

The KCIA is known to have raised funds through extortion and stock market manipulation, which were in turn used to bribe and cajole companies, individuals and even foreign governments, as happened during the Koreagate scandal in the United States in 1976. Investigations by United States Congressman Donald M. Fraser found the KCIA to have funneled bribes and favors through Korean businessman Tongsun Park in an attempt to gain favor and influence in Washington, D.C.; some 115 Members of Congress were implicated in the affair.

=== Agency for National Security Planning ===
The KCIA was purged after the agency's director, Kim Jae-kyu, assassinated President Park Chung Hee in 1979. Chun Doo-hwan was the next director in 1980. In 1981, it was renamed the Agency for National Security Planning (ANSP) with newly defined powers. The ANSP maintained its cabinet-level agency status under the president. In March 1981, the ANSP became the principal agency handling intelligence, with all other agencies being required to coordinate such activities with it. Additional legislation that year incorporated "public safety against communists and plots to overthrow the government" into its functions. The ANSP managed secrets of the state and investigated "crimes of insurrection and foreign aggression, crimes of rebellion, aiding and abetting the enemy, disclosure of military secrets, and crimes provided for in the Act Concerning Protection of Military Secrets and the National Security Act" in addition to "crimes related to duties of intelligence personnel, the supervision of information collection, and the compilation and distribution of information on other agencies' activities designed to maintain public safety."

By 1983, the ANSP's status had recovered from the purge. However, it did not have "free access to all government offices and files" under the Sixth Republic. And "overt" agents from the ANSP and other agencies, which collected information from within the National Assembly of Korea, were withdrawn from the building in May 1988. The budget of the ANSP was not made public or made available for use to the National Assembly. In July 1989, the ANSP was inspected and audited by the National Assembly "for the first time in eighteen years" after being pressured. The ANSP subsequently removed agents from the Seoul Criminal Court and the Supreme Court. The ANSP Information Coordination Committee was also disbanded due to its influence on other authorities, such as the Office of the Prosecutor General. And under allegations of human rights violations, the ANSP set up a watchdog office for supervising domestic investigations and preventing abuse by agents during interrogation.

The ANSP, however, remained involved in domestic politics through methods including "wiretapping, surveillance, and financial investigations." Although it was stripped of investigating powers over pro-North Korean activity in 1989, the ANSP continued its enforcement.

In 1994, the ANSP had a significant revision of its charter, which effectively limited its activities, following an agreement between Korea's ruling and opposition parties. As a result, an "Information Committee" in the National Assembly was established to lay a foundation for the agency's removal from the political scene and an assumption of political neutrality. The ANSP also began to develop procedures and mechanisms to thwart international crime and terrorism. In 1995, the ANSP moved to a new headquarters site in Naegok-dong, southern Seoul, from its previous location on Namsan mountain, in Imun-dong, where it had been located for the past 34 years.

=== National Intelligence Service ===
In 1999, it was officially renamed the National Intelligence Service.

According to its official publications, the NIS is divided into three directorates: International affairs, Domestic affairs, and North Korean affairs. Its current officially stated mission assigns the NIS responsibility for the:

- Collection, coordination, and distribution of information on the nation's strategy and security.
- Maintenance of documents, materials, and facilities related to the nation's classified information.
- Investigation of crimes affecting national security, such as the Military Secrecy Protection Law and the National Security Law.
- Investigation of crimes related to the missions of NIS staff.
- Planning and coordination of information and classified.

The election of Roh Moo-hyun to the South Korean presidency in 2003 brought more concerted efforts to reform the agency. Roh appointed Ko Young-koo, a former human rights lawyer, to the position of director, expressing a desire to find "someone who will set the agency straight". The anti-communist bureau of the agency was slated to be eliminated, and many domestic intelligence and surveillance activities were either abandoned or transferred to national police forces.

In December 2008, it was alleged by the official media arm of North Korea, the Korean Central News Agency, that a NIS-trained North Korean citizen had been apprehended as part of a plot to assassinate Kim Jong-il, the North Korean leader. Both the NIS and the South Korean government denied any involvement.

The NIS officially admitted in 2011 that it wiretapped Gmail accounts of South Korean citizens in the South Korean Constitutional Court.

The 2012 budget for the NIS could potentially get cut as it had shown its inefficiencies.

In the presidential election held in December 2012, NIS committed a serious crime by secretly helping Park Geun-hye's campaign, according to the Korean police investigation report. Korean prosecutors investigated the incident. in February 2015, Won was convicted on charges of instructing NIS officials to manipulate internet comments and was sentenced to three years in prison. After an appeal, the conviction was overturned. In a second trial in 2017, Won was sentenced to four years in prison. The Supreme Court upheld the sentence in April 2018. When Moon Jae-in won the 2017 election, his administration pursued nine additional charges of political interference against Won, resulting in a subsequent 7 year jail sentence in 2020. In August of 2017, the NIS formally acknowledged that it was involved in the election manipulation after an internal inquiry.

In 2015, Hacking Team's breached data showed that NIS purchased spyware from Hacking Team. An agent related to the hack was found dead in an apparent suicide. In his note, he said that the agency didn't spy on civilians or on political reactions related to 2012's presidential election.

NIS Logo (2016–2021)

In 2016, a prosecutors' investigation turned up evidence that the NIS orchestrated conservative groups since president Lee Myung-bak's administration. The evidence showed the NIS's involvement in newspaper political advertisements as well as one-person protests.

On 13 December 2020, the National Security Law was amended. This law, adopted in 1948, was designed to protect the country from North Korean threats. It stated that South Korean citizens could not praise, sympathise, correspond or aid North Koreans. However, this law has been said to have allowed the NIS to violate some important human rights, such as the forcing of confessions, as well as conducting "anti-communist" investigations. This law allowed authorities to imprison someone for up to seven years for simply possessing a book relating to North Korean ideologies. The law also extended to punishing "anti-governmental organizations", allowing the NIS to punish civilians who spoke out against or had differing ideals to the government, breaching their right to the freedom of speech. Due to the continuous threat from North Korea, there are concerns that amending this law would further exacerbate this issue.

Despite this amendment, there are still major concerns that the NIS will continue to breach human rights. Even though the amendment forbids the NIS from conducting criminal investigations, it still allows the collection of information on anyone violating the National Security Law. This new amendment will prohibit the involvement of the NIS in domestic politics following their attempt to influence the 2012 elections with a slanderous campaign against candidate Moon Jae-in. Effective from 1 January 2024, the amendment will now transfer the power to investigate domestic concerns to the national police service.

In June 2018, three former NIS directors (Lee Byung-kee, Lee Byung-ho, and Nam Jae-joon) who served in the Park administration were found guilty of bribery, related to the 2016 Park Geun-hye scandals. They illegally transferred money from the NIS budget to Park's presidential office without any approval or oversight from the National Assembly. This illegally obtained money was used by Park and her associates for private use and to pay bribes.

On 14 December 2020, the National Assembly passed a bill that transferred investigation authority of the NIS into North Korean activities in South Korea to the Korean National Police Agency.

On 2 February 2024, the South Korean National Intelligence Service (NIS) and the Defense Counterintelligence Command (DCC) are investigating whether Indonesian engineers dispatched to KAI violated the Defense Technology Security Act for allegedly attempting to leak KF-21 jet fighter technical data outside after storing it on an unauthorized USB drive.

In July 2025, it was reported that NIS has stopped broadcasting five radio channels and one TV channel to North Korea.

== Related South Korean legislative bodies ==
Term	Organisation	Motto	Legislative Body
1961–1981	Korea Central Intelligence Agency	"We work in the dark to serve the light"	Supreme Council for National Reconstruction (Successive Military Juntas)
1981–1998	Agency for National Security Planning	"We work in the dark to serve the light"	Supreme Council for National Reconstruction (Successive Military Juntas)
1998–1999	Agency for National Security Planning	"Intelligence is a national power"	Kim Dae-jung government
1999–2008	National Intelligence Service	"Intelligence is a national power"	Kim Dae-jung government
2008–2016	National Intelligence Service	"An innominate commitment to freedom and truth"	Lee Myung-bak government
2016–2021	National Intelligence Service	"A silent devotion, solely for the protection and glory of The Republic of Korea"	Park Geun-hye government
2021–2022	National Intelligence Service	"Serving Our Nation and People with Unwavering Loyalty and Devotion"	Moon Jae-in government
2022–2025	National Intelligence Service	"We work in the dark to serve the light"	Yoon Suk Yeol government
2025–	National Intelligence Service	"Intelligence is a national power"	Lee Jae Myung government

=== Scandals ===
==== Kim Dae-jung government ====
In 2000, $500,000,000 ($100,000,000 of government money, and $400,000,000 from Hyundai) was used to secure the Inter-Korean Summit. This was perceived by the general public as a bribe and a method of buying the summit, consequently leading to a public scandal in 2003. It was also rumoured that this large sum of money was the reason that Kim was awarded the 2002 Global Peace Prize for his 'Sunshine Policy' of that year. The scandal ultimately led to the arrest of former National Intelligence Service director Lim Dong-won, under the accusation of 'violating laws on foreign exchange transactions'. In May 2006, the current National Intelligence Service director, Park Jie-won, was also sentenced to three years imprisonment for his participation in the scandal, but was released in February 2007 and pardoned in December of that year.

In 2003, the scandal surrounding public eavesdropping and the illegal interception of phone calls took place under Kim Dae-jung's government. The act was later admitted to being true and to have taken place until March 2002, shortly before the end of Kim's term. The National Intelligence Service claimed that Kim Dae-jung was not informed of the illegal activities taking place.

==== Park Geun-hye government ====
In 2012, Park Geun-hye's presidential election was revealed to have been manipulated by members of the National Intelligence Service (NIS) in order to ensure that a conservative candidate came into power. Agents were accused of manipulating public opinions surrounding the election through means such as social media, as ordered by the NIS. This led to former spy chief Won Sei-hoon's three-year imprisonment in 2015 in connection to the case. Park Geun-hye was later charged on 31 March 2017, and again on 17 April of that year for the abuse of power, bribery, coercion, and leaking of government secrets. Similar manipulations were revealed to have taken place in 2011 and earlier in 2012, with surveillance being placed on other opposing politicians.

Following the 2016 South Korean political scandal and corruption surrounding Park Geun-hye's presidential role, two former NIS chiefs were arrested in November 2017. Nam Jae-joon and Lee Byung-kee were arrested for embezzlement and bribery, having illegally funded ₩4 billion won ($3.6 million) to Park and her presidential office. The money came directly from the NIS' budget without oversight from the National Assembly, though the confidentiality of the financing dictates that the NIS not be obligated to disclose all expenditures.

==== Lee Myung-bak government ====
As Park Geun-hye's predecessor, the Lee Myung-bak administration was under suspicion of involvement with the 2012 Public Opinion Manipulation scandal with the National Intelligence Service.

On 15 March 2018, Lee also admitted to receiving ₩106 million won ($100,000) of money originally allocated to the NIS. Lee denied most other corruption charges but refused to state what the ₩106 million won was used for, with many claiming that it contributed to North Korea-related activities.

== Cybersecurity ==
The National Intelligence Service in Korea is responsible for overseeing national cybersecurity policy and defending against cyber threats, including distributed denial of service (DDoS) attacks. The NIS also investigates any cyber intrusions and conducts information analyses on cyber threats. The NIS' responsibility to protect networks against cyber threats has become increasingly more important following the 2009 and 2011 cyber attacks.

The South Korean National Intelligence Service implemented the Security Verification Scheme in order to amplify the security of the national information communications network. The Security Verification Scheme is a system that verifies the safety of 'information security systems, network devices, and other IT products' used in government and public institutions. The NIS also established the Korea Cryptographic Module Validation Program in 2005 which focuses on validating the security and implementing 'conformance of a CM for the protection of sensitive information' in both governmental and public institutions.

== Intelligence on North Korea ==
One of the National Intelligence Service's core duties is to collect intelligence on North Korea. The primary goal of this activity is to provide the government with information to formulate inter-Korean strategies that both protect South Korea and lead towards future reunification. According to the NIS website, one of the key types of intelligence that the NIS works to gather are signs of possible North Korean provocations and potential security threats. Through surveilling these areas, they then construct measures to combat such risks. The NIS also monitors North Korea's political, military, diplomatic, economic and social developments in order to assess their impact on inter-Korean relations and therefore assist in providing the government context to help create effective policy.

Ultimately, the NIS also claims to 'support [the] establishment of a unified Korea led by the Republic of Korea'. While protecting the South from North Korean aggression, the NIS also states that one of its main goals is to simultaneously preserve international relations in order to 'support [the] creation of a unified Korea under liberal democracy'.

=== Controversy ===
The National Intelligence Service has come under fire on numerous occasions for providing inaccurate intelligence on North Korea. In 2011, the NIS appeared to have no prior knowledge of the death of Kim Jong-il and has also failed to provide forewarning on Pyongyang's nuclear missile tests in the past. In 2016, the accuracy of NIS intelligence was further brought into question after they were allegedly responsible for falsely reporting the death of North Korean army official Ri Yong-il, who was later found to be alive.

Former deputy director of the North Korea bureau at the NIS, Ra Jong-yil, defended the organisation, stating that "in the case of the NIS, it is particularly handicapped by the fact that its main target is a country which is the most secretive, hermetically sealed from the outside". In an interview with The Diplomat, he argued that the NIS was at a disadvantage due to the opening up of the government which in turn resulted in their activities becoming overexposed. He theorised that in some cases this could also allow for North Korea to intentionally act deceptively in order to publicly discredit one of their main South Korean targets.

In 2016, the South Korean government voted to reduce the role of the NIS in intelligence activities and pass the duty of investigating those with ties to North Korea to the national police service. This came after numerous reports of the NIS "aiding conservative politicians in elections and persecuting opposing voices by linking them to North Korea". During the 2012 election, the NIS participated in a smear-campaign against candidate Moon Jae-in that ultimately contributed to Park Geun-hye securing the win.

== See also ==
- Category:National Intelligence Service (South Korea) in fiction
- List of Directors of the National Intelligence Service (South Korea) and predecessor organizations
- Manipulation of public opinion by National Intelligence Service during 2012 South Korean presidential election
- NIS illegal wiretapping scandal

== General and cited references ==
- John Larkin, "Cleaning House: South Korea's shady spy agency is being overhauled, but will it still be able to catch North Korean spooks?" Time Asia, 9 June 2003.
- Dolf-Alexander Neuhaus, "South Korea", in: Intelligence Communities and Cultures in Asia and the Middle East: A Comprehensive Reference, 315–336. Edited by Bob de Graaff, Lynne Rienner Publishers, Incorporated, 2020.
