= Won Sei-hoon =

South Korean civil servant (born 1951)

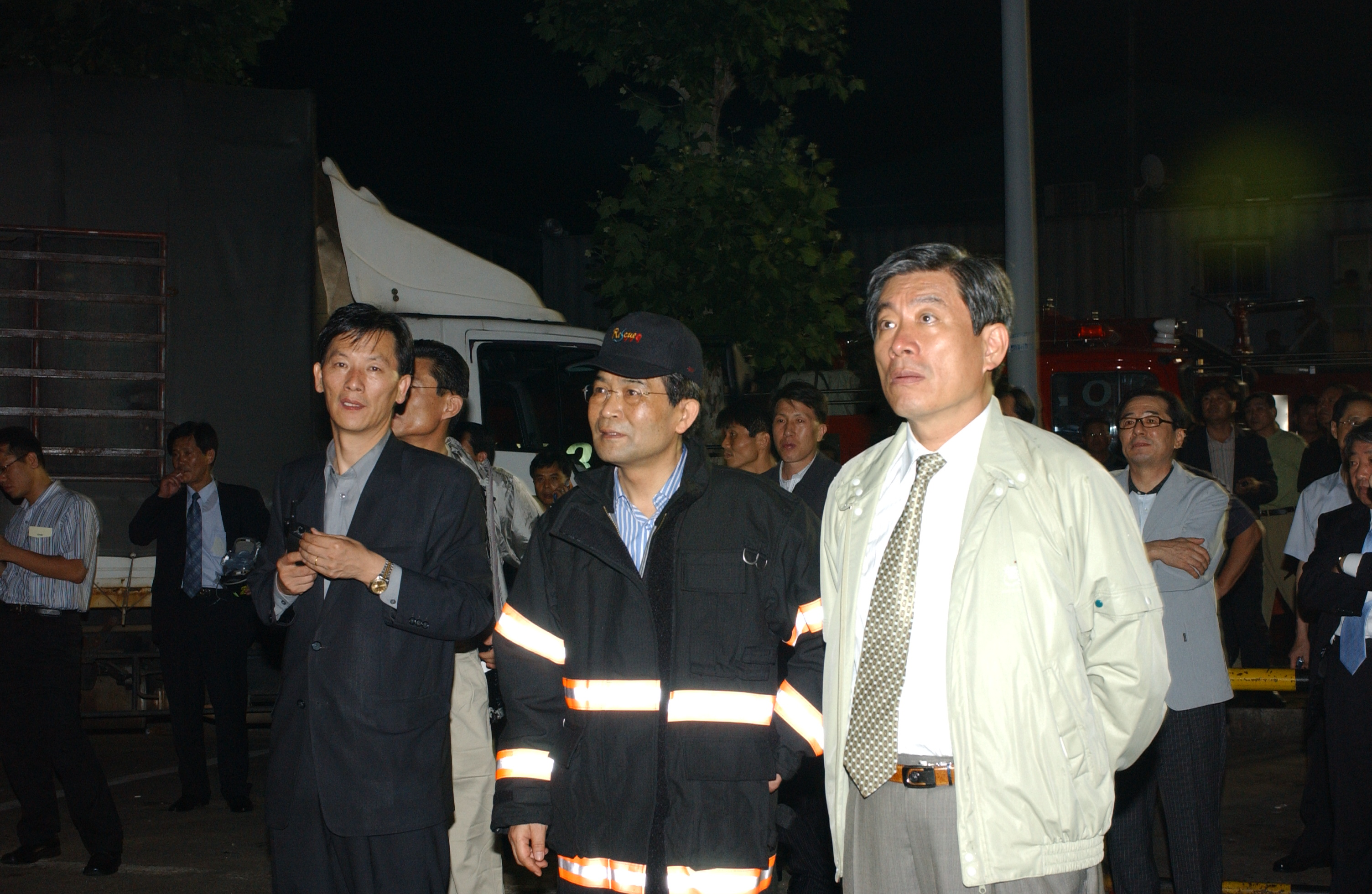
- Won Sei-hoon (right)

Korean name
- Hangul: 원세훈
- Hanja: 元世勳
- RR: Won Sehun
- MR: Wŏn Sehun

Won Sei-hoon (born January 31, 1951) is a former South Korean public servant. Born in Yeongju, he obtained a Masters in Urban Administration from Hanyang University. In 2009, he was appointed the 10th Director of the National Intelligence Service. He was indicted in June 2013 for attempted interference in the 2012 South Korean presidential election by allegedly ordering an online misinformation campaign against opposition candidates. On January 22, 2014, he was found guilty for graft. He got a 2-year jail term and a fine of some 160 million won. In 2015, the Supreme Court returned to a lower court this ruling. On August 30, 2017, he was sentenced to four years in prison by the Seoul High Court.
