= Lim Dong-won =

South Korean politician (born 1934)

- Hangul: 임동원
- Hanja: 林東源
- RR: Im Dongwon
- MR: Im Tongwŏn

Lim Dong-won (Korean: 임동원; born 1934) is a retired South Korean politician who was a top aide during the administration of Kim Dae-jung and a key architect of the Sunshine Policy, holding the post of Unification Minister until losing a no-confidence vote on September 3, 2001; he stepped down after being impeached on December 23, 2001. His involvement in secret payments to North Korea to facilitate the 2000 summit meeting resulted in an 18-month suspended jail sentence in 2003. In 2004 he was named the head of the Sejong Institute. In his retirement he has been critical of United States policy on North Korea. He has also been indicted in connection with an extensive wiretapping scandal uncovered in 2005.

Before joining Kim Dae-jung's administration he had served as head of Kim's Asia-Pacific Peace Foundation; deputy chief of the unification board under Roh Tae-woo; and ambassador to Nigeria and Australia in the 1980s.

Preceded by Chun Yong-taek	Director of the National Intelligence Service; December 24, 1999–March 26, 2001	Succeeded by Shin Kuhn
Preceded by Kang In-duk	Unification Minister of South Korea; March 27, 2001–January 2002	Succeeded by Hong Soon-young
