= Office of National Security =

South Korean government agency

- 국가안보실

Agency overview
- Formed: 23 March 2013
- Jurisdiction: Government of South Korea
- Headquarters: Presidential Residence, Seoul
- Agency executives: Wi Sung-lac, Director; Kim Tae-hyo, 1st Deputy Director (Foreign Affairs); Yin Sung-hwan, 2nd Deputy Director (Defense); Wang Yun-jong, 3rd Deputy Director (Economic Security)
- Parent department: President of South Korea
- Child agency: National Center for Crisis Management

Korean name
- Hangul: 국가안보실
- Hanja: 國家安保室
- RR: Gukga anbosil
- MR: Kukka anbosil

The Office of National Security (Korean: 국가안보실) assists the President of South Korea. It is led by a ministerial-level Director who is appointed by the President without nomination hearing at the legislature unlike other ministerial-level posts. The director often serves as the counterpart of National Security Advisor of the United States. Moreover, the director serves as the chairperson of the standing committee of National Security Council, which is established by Article 91 of the Constitution and chaired by the President, whilst its first Deputy Director serves as the Council's secretary-general.

== History ==
The very first attempt to install a control tower to oversee the national security issues within South Korean government was initiated in Roh administration. The prototype organisation was established during Roh Moo-hyun administration but was abolished by Roh's successor, Lee Myung-bak. In 2013 the following Park Geun-hye administration established the Office to revive the organisation which oversees national security affairs and supports National Security Council. President Moon Jae-in restructured the Office and expanded its functions. Under President Moon, the first deputy dealt with security affairs whilst its second deputy foreign affairs and Inter-Korean relations. Under Moon's successor, Yoon Suk-yeol, deputies' roles have been reversed.

In January 2024, the third deputy director position was created.

== Organisation ==
This is the organization of the National Security Bureau with the names of the current senior officials placed in each position.

The First Deputy Director coordinates and manages pending issues in the fields of diplomacy and security as well as overall policies of the National Security Office, and concurrently serves as the Secretary-General of the National Security Council.

The Second Deputy Director maintains the national crisis management system at all times while managing pending defense policy issues.

The Third Deputy Director is responsible for emerging security affairs, including economic security, science and technology, and cyber security. The Office of the Secretary for Economic Security under the Third Deputy Director handles supply chain, export control, nuclear power, and science and technology security affairs, while the Office of the Secretary for Cyber Security is also under the Third Deputy Director.

- National Security Office Director : Wi Sung-lac

- 1st Deputy General Manager ( In charge of Diplomatic Security and Unification) : Kim Tae-hyo

- Secretary for Security Strategy : Kang Jae-won
- Secretary for Foreign : Lee Chung-myeon
- Secretary for Unification : Lee In-bae

- 2nd Deputy General Manager (in charge of national defense and security) : Yin Sung-hwan

- Secretary of Defense : Choi Byung-ok
- Director of the National Crisis Management Center : Kim Sang-ho

- 3rd Deputy General Manager (in charge of Security Economic) : Wang Yun-jong

- Secretary of Economic Security : Kim Hyun Wook
- Secretary of Cyber Security : Shin Yeong-seok
