= 2020 killing of a South Korean fisheries official =

- Maritime dispute between North and South Korea in the Yellow Sea
- Date: 21 September 2020
- Location: Waters near Yeonpyeongdo

On 21 September 2020, Lee Dae-jun, a 47-year-old civil servant from the South Korean Ministry of Oceans and Fisheries, swam into North Korean waters west of the island Yeonpyeongdo and was shot and killed by North Korean soldiers, who then burned and disposed of his body. This incident marks the second such killing of a South Korean civilian since the accidental shooting of a South Korean civilian by North Korea in July 2008. Following this incident, leaders of both North and South Korea expressed their apologies to the South Korean public.

== Background ==
The communication channels between North and South Korea were completely cut off by North Korea on 9 June 2020. Subsequently, on 16 June, the Inter-Korean Liaison Office was destroyed. South Korean Unification Minister Kim Yeon-chul resigned the following day, taking responsibility for the deterioration of inter-Korean relations. As the COVID-19 pandemic continued, the North Korean government stated in August that the emergency quarantine agencies in the coastal areas would further strengthen the epidemic prevention and control monitoring of the coast and its surrounding areas, set up additional coastal monitoring stations, and collect, burn and bury the garbage washed ashore in accordance with epidemic prevention regulations. The government also stated that it would take strong measures in epidemic prevention to completely close and block the border, the boundary line and the coastline, and further deepen the work of eliminating abnormal phenomena from the root. On 10 September, United States Forces Korea Commander Robert B. Abrams said at an online meeting of the Center for Strategic and International Studies that the North Korean government had set up a new buffer zone about 1 to 2 kilometers from the China–North Korea border, established special forces and issued shooting orders. After the incident, South Korean officials believed that North Korea did this for the purpose of epidemic prevention and that it was probably an accident. BBC News Seoul correspondent Laura Bicker said that in addition to North Korea's attitude of epidemic prevention, another reason was that North Korea was about to hold a large-scale military parade to celebrate the 75th anniversary of the founding of the Workers' Party of Korea, and the appearance of suspicious South Koreans on the maritime boundary line may raise the vigilance of the patrolling soldiers.

== The events ==
On 21 September 2020, Lee Dae-jun, a South Korean civil servant, went missing while on duty near Yeonpyeongdo, the northernmost point of the western sea of South Korea. He was found by a North Korean fisheries vessel at around 3:30 p.m. that day. After receiving the news, the South Korean Coast Guard immediately dispatched 20 search and rescue vessels and helicopters to conduct a sea and air search and rescue operation, but found nothing. The South Korean Ministry of National Defense stated that it was initially confirmed that the civil servant jumped into the sea from the ship en route to defect to North Korea, but was shot at from a distance by North Korean guards and died on the spot. It said that his body was taken away by North Korea and cremated. The Republic of Korea Armed Forces stated that the fire was observed in the North Korean waters at Yeonpyeongdo at the time, confirming that North Korea was burning the body. In response, the North Korean side stated that the person was wearing a life jacket and entered North Korean territorial waters by relying on a floating object, but did not answer the military's question to confirm his identity. The military first fired two blank shots, and then fired more than ten bullets at him in accordance with the maritime patrol and duty operation guidelines.

After the incident, the South Korean Ministry of National Defense released details of the incident and condemned North Korea's actions as violating the Panmunjom Declaration, and as "barbaric acts". In response, North Korea issued a notice through the United Front Department of the Workers' Party of Korea, stating that there were discrepancies between the two Koreas regarding the incident, and that South Korea had "unilaterally" released its speculation on the incident without requesting North Korea to explain the law enforcement process, using strong words with a confrontational tone such as "barbaric acts," to which North Korea "could not help but express strong regret". On 24 September, the South Korean Ministry of National Defense gave a non-public report to the National Assembly's Defense Committee and Intelligence Committee, stating that the North Korean Navy Command may have received reports of South Korean citizens drifting into North Korean waters. The South Korean military also detected signs of North Korea conducting search and rescue operations after discovering the victim, but it is unknown who issued the shooting order. The National Assembly's Defense Committee and Intelligence Committee also indicated that around 3:30 p.m. on the day of the incident, after the victim's boat was discovered by the North Korean military, they began to monitor the North Korean military's boats until the North Korean military issued the shooting order at 9 p.m., when the situation became tense.

On 25 September, the South Korean Coast Guard dispatched four 500-ton ships, three 300-ton ships, six small ships and two aircraft, while the Navy dispatched 16 ships and four aircraft to conduct a search. At a press conference on 27 September, Suh Joo-seok, Director of the Secretariat of the National Security Council of South Korea, said that the South Korean government formally requested a joint investigation with North Korea on 27 September and hoped that both sides would investigate the facts in an open manner. On the same day, the Korean Central News Agency published an article "Warning the South Korean Authorities" stating that North Korea would not interfere with what kind of search operations South Korea conducted in its territorial waters, but would not stand idly by in the face of violations of North Korean territorial waters. The South Korean Coast Guard denied entering North Korean waters, stating that the search was limited to the waters south of the Northern Limit Line.

== Impact and reactions ==
This incident is the second shooting of a South Korean civilian since Park Wang-ja, a South Korean woman, was shot and killed in July 2008 while traveling in the Mount Kumgang Tourist Region in North Korea, allegedly because she accidentally entered a North Korean military restricted area. This incident has further exacerbated tensions between North and South Korea. As for whether North Korea violated the Pyongyang Joint Declaration signed on 19 September 2018, the South Korean Ministry of National Defense stated that it only applies to artillery fire and not to shooting, which has drawn criticism from South Korean society. The report pointed out that the South Korean government had contacted North Korea multiple times through the United Nations forces and other channels on 23 September, but had not received a response. Therefore, regarding the fact that North Korea did not take the initiative to report the incident, the South Korean government only responded that it would study whether it violated the spirit of the relevant declaration.

=== Apologies from North Korea and South Korea ===
After the incident, North Korean leader Kim Jong Un apologized to South Korean President Moon Jae-in on 25 September, stating that "we apologize to you for this incident in our waters that is of no benefit to inter-Korean relations." He only admitted to the shooting but denied burning the body, and apologized to the South Korean people through the United Front Department of the Workers' Party of Korea. Three days later, when South Korean President Moon Jae-in chaired a meeting of the Blue House staff, he said that although the two Koreas were in a state of division, the incident should not have happened. He also expressed his deepest condolences and sympathies to the victim's family regardless of how the victim arrived in North Korean waters. On 6 October, Moon Jae-in also wrote a personal letter to the victim's child, expressing that he was "also heartbroken".

=== Accountability after the fact ===
On 24 September, The Chosun Ilbo reported that the deceased's brother called the newspaper to say that the South Korean government and military had not formally notified the family of the matter. He said that the South Korean government's accusation that the deceased attempted to cross the border was a smear. He pointed out that the location where his brother was shot and where he went missing was about 38 kilometers away, during which time he drifted for more than 30 hours. He questioned, “Did he know that he would exhaust his strength to swim to North Korea?” He also asked the South Korean government to provide a detailed and clear explanation. The missing civil servant's colleagues also said that they had not found any signs that he might defect to North Korea. Regarding the doubts about whether the deceased had attempted to cross the border, Yonhap News Agency reported that the evidence held by the South Korean side was obtained through intelligence obtained by listening to North Korean communications. Although the South Korean National Intelligence Service was not able to make a complete judgment on this, according to the intelligence obtained by South Korea and the United States through various channels, the relevant arguments have been set.

On 1 October, Ravina Shamdasani, spokesperson for the Office of the United Nations High Commissioner for Human Rights (OHCHR), said that the OHCHR urged North and South Korea to immediately launch a fair investigation into the shooting of a South Korean civil servant. Both sides should find out the truth and confirm whether the incident violated the right to life and arbitrarily deprived others of their lives. On 6 October, the deceased's brother submitted an application to the OHCHR Seoul Office, requesting an investigation into the truth of his brother's death. On 23 October, South Korean Unification Minister Lee In-young said that the North Korean government had said that it would send the civil servant back once the body was found, and the South Korean government would never give up on continuing to search for the body. On 23 October, Tomás Ojea Quintana, the United Nations Special Rapporteur on North Korean Human Rights, attended a video conference of the United Nations General Assembly Third Committee and said that North Korea's shooting of a South Korean civil servant violated the International Human Rights Law and urged the North Korean government to immediately stop using gunfire to prohibit entry into the country as part of the COVID-19 prevention and control measures. Oh Hyun-joo, South Korea's deputy representative to the United Nations, said, “We hope that North Korea will respond to our request for a thorough joint investigation,” and pointed out that “the inter-Korean military communication lines should also be restored in order to discuss related matters.”

The report from the Korean Central News Agency pointed out that the primary responsibility for this incident lies with South Korea. It was because South Korea failed to properly manage its people in the relevant waters during the COVID-19 pandemic that this incident occurred. It also pointed out that North Korea was unaware of the reason why the South Korean resident entered North Korean waters. Tomás Ojea Quintana, the UN Special Rapporteur on North Korean Human Rights, subsequently sent a letter to the South Korean government in November regarding this incident, urging the release of information about the North Korean military shooting of a South Korean civil servant. On 15 January 2021, the South Korean government replied that it had provided relevant information to the family members of the civil servant who was shot by North Korea through various channels, and that it was revising its procedures to prevent similar incidents from happening again, focusing on requesting North Korea's cooperation in the investigation of the case through the communication network. A South Korean government official revealed that the South Korean government had not sent any telegrams to the North Korean government inquiring about the incident after the inter-Korean liaison office resumed communication in October 2021.

=== Reopening the investigation ===
On 14 June 2022, following the inauguration of Yoon Suk Yeol, the National Security Office stated that it would promptly release more information regarding the follow-up of the incident on the premise of "not harming the major interests of the country". Subsequently, on 16 June, the Office of the President stated that the Moon Jae-in administration had not responded effectively to the demands of the bereaved family of the civil servant who was shot and killed by the North Korean army two years ago to find out the truth. On the same day, the Coast Guard held a press conference stating that the victim of the incident had no intention of "crossing the border" and overturned the conclusion of the previous investigation report after one year and two months. The Commissioner of the Coast Guard, Jeong Bong-hoon, apologized for the results of this investigation. The following day, the South Korean Board of Audit and Inspection announced that it would launch an investigation into the two major government departments, the Coast Guard and the Ministry of National Defense, regarding the incident. On the same day, the Coast Guard Commissioner Jeong Bong-hoon resigned due to a series of controversies arising from the investigation of the incident. In addition, eight other Coast Guard officers also expressed their intention to resign. In response, the Office of the President decided on 24 June to persuade them to resign collectively, and stated that although it understood their position, the Board of Audit and Inspection and other units were investigating the relevant departments, and the resignations of the relevant personnel would be returned.,Former National Security Office Director Suh Hoon said that he would actively cooperate with the relevant departments to find out the truth regarding the reopening of the investigation of the incident, and had no intention of evading the investigation.

On 16 June, the Ministry of National Defense of South Korea issued a statement saying that “the statement released at the time speculated that the murdered civil servant was trying to defect to North Korea, which confused the public’s view. At the same time, due to security reasons, we were unable to disclose more facts, which we deeply regret”. At a regular press conference on 20 June, the Deputy Spokesperson of the Ministry of National Defense, Moon Hong-sik, said that the Ministry of National Defense and the military should obey the decision made in accordance with laws and regulations. The specific scope and content of information disclosure will be further negotiated at that time. The following day, he pointed out that although the judgment that the person involved in the incident “defected to North Korea” was overturned, no new evidence was obtained to prove that he did not intend to defect to North Korea. South Korean President Yoon Suk Yeol said that the demand for disclosure was difficult to accept, and thus denied the demand for disclosure of intelligence, because it would bear a huge burden that was not conducive to security and the opposition of the United States. On 23 June, the Presidential Archives of South Korea did not respond to the family's request to disclose the relevant presidential archives on the grounds that “the existence of the relevant archives could not be confirmed”.

In August, South Korean prosecutors seized and searched the presidential archives. In September, they summoned former Unification Minister Kim Yeon-chul, former 3rd Deputy Director of the National Intelligence Service Kim Joon-hwan, and former 1st Deputy Director of the National Security Office of the Blue House Kim Yoo-geun for investigation. In October, they summoned former Chief of Staff to the President Roh Young-min for investigation. In the same month, Suh Wook was arrested. Prosecutors suspected that Suh Wook, then Minister of National Defense, ordered the deletion of military secrets, such as wiretapping information related to the Lee Dae-jun case, on the instructions of Suh Hoon. Suh Wook was released on bail 17 days after his arrest. On 3 December, Suh Hoon was arrested and indicted on December 9. Prosecutors accused the Moon Jae-in government of concluding that Lee Dae-jun voluntarily crossed the border to North Korea without sufficient evidence, and that Suh Hoon was suspected of ordering the deletion of relevant documents to cover up the shooting of Lee Dae-jun. Suh Hoon denied the charges, saying that the Moon Jae-in government's conclusion that Lee Dae-jun surrendered to North Korea was based on intelligence within a limited time. On 13 December, Roh Young-min was questioned again. On 14 December, Park Ji-won, former director of the National Intelligence Service of South Korea, went to the Seoul Central District Prosecutors' Office for questioning. Park Ji-won stated that he had never received any instructions from Moon Jae-in or Suh Hoon to delete the data, and reiterated that he had never instructed staff to delete data during his tenure as director of the National Intelligence Service.
