= Sunshine Policy =

Theoretical basis for South Korea's foreign policy towards North Korea

The Reconciliation and Cooperation Policy Towards the North (Korean: 대북화해협력정책; Hanja: 對北和解協力政策), colloquially referred to as the Sunshine Policy (햇볕정책; 햇볕政策), is a theoretical basis adopted by the South Korean presidential administrations of Kim Dae-jung, Roh Moo-hyun and Moon Jae-in regarding South Korea's foreign policy towards North Korea.

The policy was devised by president Kim Dae-jung in 1998. It resulted in greater political contact between the two states, leading to two inter-Korean summit meetings in Pyongyang (June 2000 and October 2007), as well as several high-profile business ventures, and brief meetings of family members separated by the Korean War. In 2000, Kim was awarded the Nobel Peace Prize for his implementation of the Sunshine Policy.

Moon Jae-in's government began reconciling with North Korea following his election in 2017, thus beginning a revival of the Sunshine Policy. Moon's effort to improve the inter-Korean relationship resulted in three inter-Korean summits in a year, including two summits held in Panmunjom (April and May 2018) that marked the first inter-Korean summits to be held outside of Pyongyang, and one in Pyongyang (September 2018). Moon's version of the Sunshine Policy became known as the "Moonshine Policy".

== Background ==
The policy emerged largely in the context of the growing economic gap between the two Koreas: the South was strengthening itself and experiencing economic prosperity that had begun under President Park Chung Hee in the 1970s while the North was experiencing severe economic decline, consequently caused the 1990s North Korean famine and faced bankruptcy. The Sunshine Policy aimed at mitigating this gap in economic power and restoring lost communication between the two states.

Furthermore, the background to South Korea's decision to engage North Korea through cooperation rather than maintaining a conservative stance in the past shows a historical shift in the South Korea's domestic politics as well. According to Son Key-young, a South Korean author, the Sunshine Policy emerged ultimately as evidence of the evolving South Korean national identity since the Cold War. The end of the Cold War "ushered in an era of unprecedented confusion in South Korea over whether to define North Korea as friend or foe".

== Etymology ==
The policy is also known as The Operational Policy Towards the North (대북운영정책) and The Embracing Policy (포용정책).

The term "Sunshine Policy" originates from a speech given by Kim Dae-jung after his election, in which he referenced The North Wind and the Sun, one of Aesop's fables.

In the tale, the north wind and the sun debate which one is stronger. They challenge each other to see who can get a passing traveler to remove his cloak. The wind tries with all its might to bluster and blow the cloak away, but the wind's chill makes the traveler cling to his cloak even more. The sun, however, has a different effect: its blistering rays cause the traveler to sweat and, unable to continue walking in the sweltering heat, he decides to take off his cloak. Therefore, the meaning can be interpreted as persuasion triumphing over force.

In the framework of this fable, South Korea needs to be warm towards the North in order for the latter to feel secure enough to 'remove its cloak' (make peace and disarm) instead of using the harsh wind (brute force and military aggression) which would only make the North cling to its 'cloak' (nationalism and isolation). Hence, the Sunshine Policy is based upon the notion that kindness and mutual co-operation are more effective than demands and aggression.

== Overview ==
The main aim of the policy was to soften North Korea's attitudes towards the South by encouraging interaction and economic assistance.

The national security policy had three basic principles:

- No military provocation from the North will be accepted;
- The South will not attempt to annex or occupy the North in any way;
- The South will actively seek peace and mutual partnership with the North.

These principles were meant to convey the message that the South does not wish to absorb the North or to undermine its government; its goal was peaceful coexistence rather than regime change. Kim Dae-jung's administration was well aware of the prevalent fear spread within North Korea, afraid of its own identity as a state being taken away through coerced integration or any interaction with the international community.

In line with these principles, Kim ordered that the term "reunification" be removed from the vocabulary used to describe relations with their northern neighbour as this promoted the idea that the South sought to absorb or destroy the North. Instead, they favoured terms such as "inter-Korean relations" or "policy towards North Korea".

Kim's administration also outlined two other core policies. The first was the separation of politics and economics. This hoped to facilitate inter-Korean trade despite any political challenges, boosting the North's economy and, in turn, inducing change in the North's economic policy.

The second component was reciprocity. Initially, it was intended that the two states would treat each other as equals, each making concessions and compromises, with the philosophy that "give and take" was required from both parties. Perhaps most criticism of the policy stemmed from the significant backpedaling by the South on this principle in the face of unexpected rigidity from the North. It ran into trouble just two months into the Sunshine era, when South Korea requested the creation of a reunion center for divided families in exchange for fertilizer assistance; North Korea denounced this as horse trading and cut off talks. A year later, the South announced its goal would be "flexible reciprocity" based on Confucian values; as the "elder brother" of the relationship, the South would provide aid without expecting an immediate reciprocation and without requesting a specific form of reciprocity. The South also announced that it would provide humanitarian assistance without any expectations of concessions in return.

The logic of the policy was based on the belief that, even in light of its continuing shortages and economic duress, the North's government will not collapse, disintegrate, or reform itself, even if the South were to apply strong pressure. It was believed that military tensions can be lessened through bilateral and multilateral frameworks. This emphasized the normalization of political and economic relations between both the United States and North Korea as well as Japan.

Sunshine Policy is often compared to the Western German Chancellor Willy Brandt's Ostpolitik (Eastern Policy) which is a foreign policy of change through détente in the hopes of improving relations with East Germany, the Soviet Union, Poland and other Soviet Bloc countries in the early 1970s.

== Kim Dae-jung Administration: 1998–2003 ==
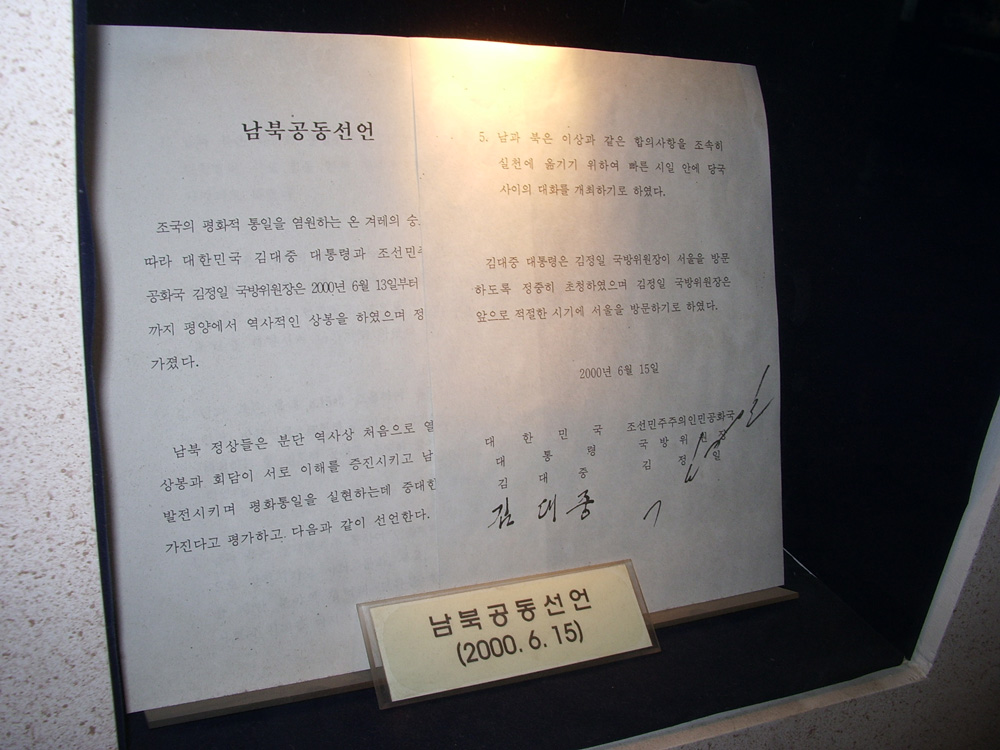
June 15th Joint Declaration 6.15

The Sunshine Policy was first formulated and implemented under Kim Dae-jung's government. North-South cooperative business developments began, including a railroad and the Mount Kumgang Tourist Region, where several thousand South Korean citizens still traveled until 2008, when there was a shooting incident and the trips were cancelled. Though negotiations for them were difficult, three reunions between divided families were held.

The year 2000 marked a significant milestone in relations between the two states when Kim Dae-jung and Kim Jong Il came together for the 2000 inter-Korean summit, the first-time leaders of each Korea had met since the end of the Civil War. The conference was held between 13 and 15 June. By the end of the meeting, the June 15th North–South Joint Declaration was adopted between the two Koreas. In the declaration, the two Koreas reached an agreement on five points, to settle the problem of independent reunification, to promote peaceful reunification, to solve humanitarian problems such as the issue of separated families, to encourage cooperation and exchange in their economy, and to have a dialogue between the North and South. After the summit, however, talks between the two states stalled. Criticism of the policy intensified and Unification Minister Lim Dong-won lost a no-confidence vote on September 3, 2001. Returning from his meeting in Washington with newly elected President Bush, Kim Dae-jung described his meeting as embarrassing while privately cursing President Bush and his hardliner approach. This meeting negated any chance of a North Korean visit to South Korea. With the Bush administration labeling North Korea as being part of the "axis of evil", North Korea renounced the non-proliferation treaty, kicked out UN inspectors, and restarted its nuclear program. In 2002 a short naval skirmish over disputed fishing territory killed six South Korean naval soldiers, further chilling relations.

== Roh Moo-hyun administration: 2003–2008 ==
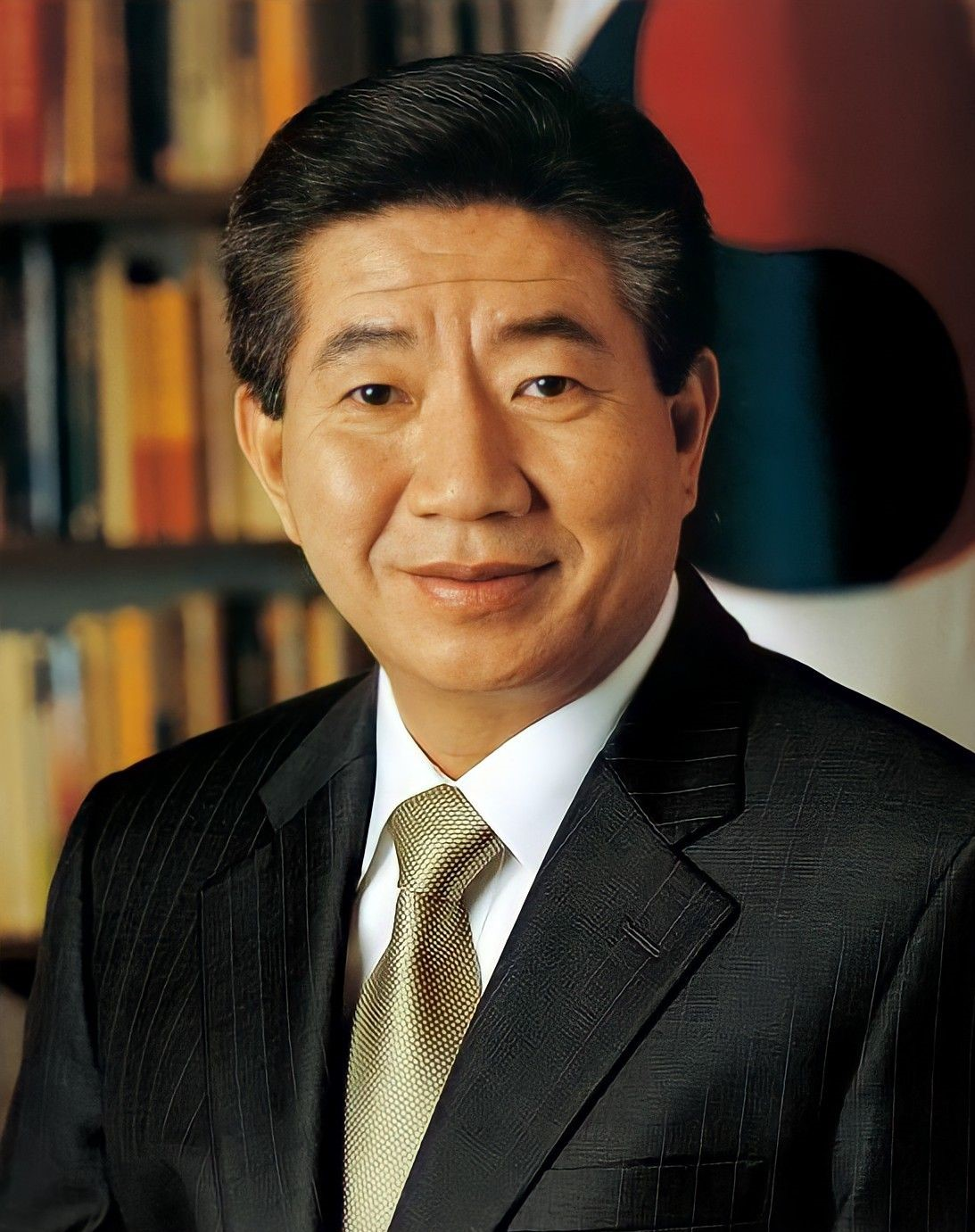
President Roh Moo-hyun

President Roh Moo-hyun continued the policy of his predecessor, and relations on the divided peninsula warmed somewhat from 2002. In 2003, the issue of the North's possession of nuclear weapons surfaced again, with both North Korea and the United States accusing each other of breaching the Agreed Framework.

Nevertheless, Roh stayed committed to the policy and his government continued to supply the North with humanitarian aid. The two governments continued cooperation on the projects begun under Kim Dae-jung and also started the Kaesong Industrial Park, with South Korea spending the equivalent of just over $324 million on aid to the North in 2005.

Both the North and South Korean Governments agreed to hold a summit in Pyongyang on August 20, 2007, but this was later postponed to October 2 to 4 due in part to an internal crisis within North Korea. Unlike his predecessor Kim Dae-jung who travelled to Pyongyang by plane, Roh travelled from Seoul to Pyongyang overland by car on October 2. Roh made a stopover at Panmunjom and crossed the Military Demarcation Line by foot, stating that his gesture would symbolize the future reunification of Korea.

There appeared to be a pro-unification Korean trend in public attitudes during the Roh administration, though there are significant differences between generations, political groups, and regions. But the ruling Uri Party, which strongly supported it, suffered electoral defeats and in 2008 the party lost its majority in the government. The new government took a harsher stance toward North Korea.

== Criticism ==
North Korean defector and journalist Kang Chol-hwan, who spent nine years in a North Korean prison, claims that Kim Dae-jung was mistaken in offering assistance to the North without any conditions of improving human rights in return. Kang disagrees with claims that the Sunshine Policy has led to a settlement of peace between North and South and questions the concept of no-strings-attached humanitarian aid, saying "it is important to understand that North Koreans are starving not because of a lack of aid from South Korea or the U.S., but because they are deprived of freedom. Giving aid only throws a line to the government, and prolongs starvation, surely a perverse outcome."

Furthermore, the policy built upon "flexible reciprocity" is often criticized to be an inappropriate ideal, bound to have realistic obstacles in Inter-Korea relations. Rather than viewing North Korea as a full equal to its power, South Korea took the stance that the stronger counterpart should wait patiently until the other has gained enough power, allowing North Korea to reciprocate with time. It is theorized that the 'time-differential' in the interaction between the two nations did not aid in the restoration of trust and cooperation but led to further problems in missing transparency and the delay in fully understanding the implications of the policy, which did not benefit the mass as much as expected.

Some critics of the Sunshine Policy contend that rather than increasing the chances of reunification or undermining the regime in North Korea, it has been used instead for political gain in domestic politics in the South. They point to what they say are the continuing provocations and criminal activities committed by the North, such as the 2002 sea battle that left several South Korean sailors dead, the counterfeiting of American money, and what they call the North's general unwillingness to reciprocate Seoul's gestures of goodwill, as evidence that the North is interested only in receiving money and aid to prop up the communist regime. Critics also believe that, in exchange for providing humanitarian aid, the South should demand that the North return detained South Korean citizens and the remains of POWs from the Korean War. Some see the Kaesong Industrial Park as merely a way for large South Korean companies to employ cheaper labor.

Many South Korean conservative-leaning observers see the weakening of the US-South Korea alliance as being due in large part to the Sunshine Policy; they say it has led the South to favor the North's interests over those of its ally, the United States, and that it leads South Korean politicians to unreasonably mute or censor criticism of the North and even to ignore the sacrifices of its own soldiers so as to avoid upsetting the North. They say that this is harmful to the South's national interest in being allied with the United States, and actually damages the chances for a smooth and peaceful reunification. Internationally and at home, the South Korean government has been criticized for repeatedly abstaining from United Nations votes condemning the North's human rights record. The government defends the abstentions by citing the special character of inter-Korean relations.

Conspiracies have been alleged about South Korea's motivations for this policy. One North Korean defector who worked on weapons systems claimed that South Korean intelligence wanted to suppress his story, because it would shed a bad light on the policy. According to The Wall Street Journal, several U.S. senators believe his story.

The effectiveness of the Sunshine Policy continues to be debated. Even its opponents agreed that the humanitarian emergency aid provided by the international community and South Korea contributed to the relief of North Korea's great famine during the late 1990s. However, the ensuing cooperation policies in fact produced a backlash to goodwill argument stating that the government guided economic assistance and also direct investment instead saved or even brought back the hyper militarized North Korean regime, which because of these delays the inevitable economic reforms consequently stalled the nuclear crisis. This debate now had entered a very decisive combination. The latest supposedly alleged hydrogen bomb test seemed to very much falsify the effectiveness and also the ability to produce the desired result of positive inducement policies based on the Sunshine Policy. The idea was that South Korean economics assistance could succeed in persuading North Korea's post-communist reform and opening, which would hopefully promote peace between North Korea and South Korea. Even with all this effort and good intentions that were put into the Sunshine Policy, the policy itself began to fall apart and would soon be no more. The South Korean government officially acknowledged the reverse effects of both the current and existing inducement approaches. In an address to the National Assembly, president Park Geun Hye declared "Gone are the days when we caved into the North's provocations and unconditionally pumped aid into the North". This critical reappraisal led to the complete shutdown of the Kaeseong Industrial Complex, the last remaining symbol of the Sunshine Policy. The building was closed on February 11, 2016.

However, it can be suggested that the Sunshine Policy had some positive effect on North Korea's military and nuclear stance. Kim Suk-young mentions that North Korean government is "both strong and weak" and it is affected by "external and internal pressures" and its decisions to militarize and nuclearize or not are made due to the relationship with other countries. The author of Inside the Red Box: North Korea's Post-Totalitarian Politics, Patrick McEachern agrees that North Korea's government policy is not determined by outside influence, noting North Korea has never and likely will never change its behavior to become peaceful due to outside pressure. The view that the Sunshine Policy de-escalated tensions may be supported by the comparative paucity of North Korean missile and nuclear tests while the policy was in place. North Korea engaged in nuclear tests five times and missile tests eight times in the eight years since the policy ended in 2008; by comparison, only one nuclear test and three missile tests were conducted before 2008. However, this increase may be indicative of the North gaining the technological capabilities to conduct extensive nuclear and missile tests circa 2008. (Refer to List of nuclear weapons tests of North Korea, List of North Korean missile tests, Kwangmyŏngsŏng-3, Kwangmyŏngsŏng-1.)

== End of the Sunshine Policy: 2008–2017 ==
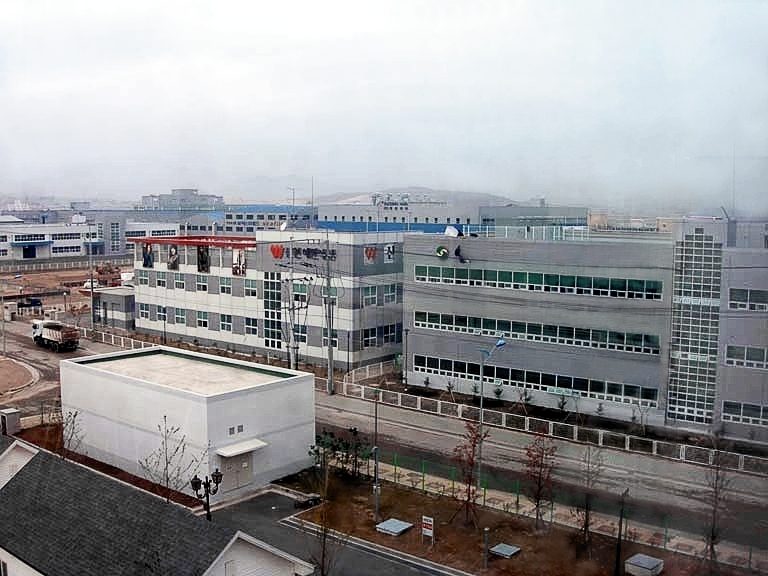
Kaesong Industrial Region

On October 9, 2006, after the nuclear and missile tests, South Korea suspended aid shipments to the North and put their military on high alert status. There was much concern regarding how South Korea can maintain a cooperative policy towards the North when such provocative acts occurred. Nonetheless, the government of South Korea insisted that at least some aspects of the Sunshine Policy, including the Kumgangsan Tourist Region and the Kaesong Industrial Region would continue.

From March 2008, however, the new president of the South, Lee Myung-bak and his conservative Grand National Party took a different stance to North Korea, and the South Korean government stated that any expansion of the economic cooperation at the Kaesong Industrial Region would only happen if the North resolved the international standoff over its nuclear weapons. Relations have again chilled, with North Korea making military moves such as a series of short-range ship-to-ship missile tests.

After the 2009 North Korean nuclear test, the relationship between Seoul and Pyongyang was again strained. According to Jungmin Kang writing in the Bulletin of the Atomic Scientists: "Because of the post-1998 'Sunshine Policy', many South Korean nongovernmental organizations and the public weren't concerned about North Korea's threats, believing that Pyongyang would never use nuclear weapons against them." South Korea's response to the nuclear test, although dampened by the recent death of its former President Roh Moo-hyun, included signing the Proliferation Security Initiative to prevent the shipment of nuclear materials to North Korea.

In November 2010, the South Korean Unification Ministry officially declared the Sunshine Policy a failure, thus bringing the policy to a formal end.

== Return to the Sunshine Policy: 2017–2020 ==
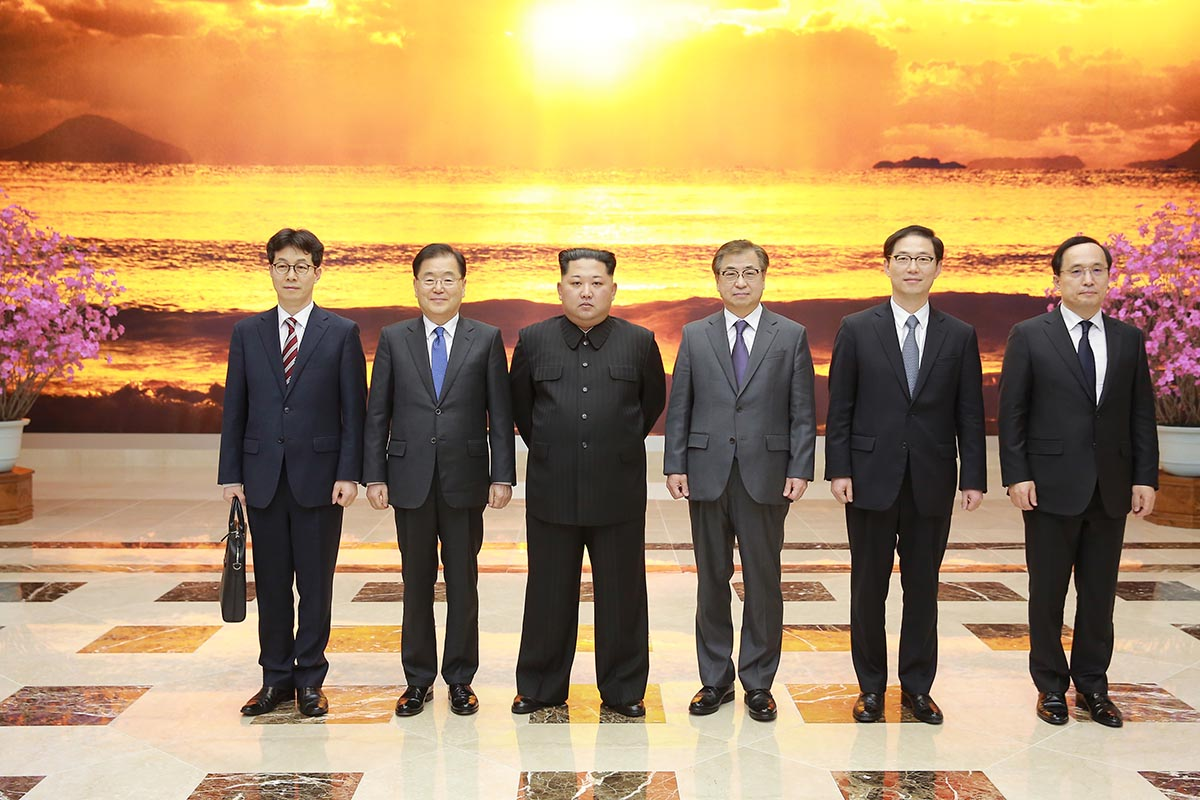
Kim Jong-un meeting with South Korean envoys at the Workers' Party of Korea main building, 6 March 2018

Moon Jae-in was elected President of South Korea in 2017, promising to return South Korea to the Sunshine Policy. 2018 and 2019 saw a rapid acceleration in talks between the two countries, seeking inter-Korean dialogue, denuclearization and demilitarization, and eventual unification of the peninsula.

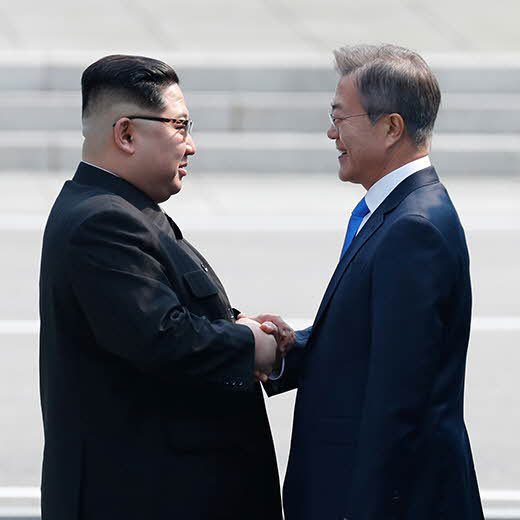
Kim and Moon shake hands in greeting at the demarcation line.

On 27 April 2018, the first of three summits took place between Moon and Kim in the South Korean side of the Joint Security Area inside of the Peace House. The summit ended with both countries pledging to work towards complete denuclearization of the Korean Peninsula. They also vowed to declare an official end to the Korean War within a year. The Panmunjom Declaration was signed by leaders of both countries, which laid out the goals of inter-Korean dialogue and peace negotiations. Both countries called for the end of longstanding military activities in the region of the Korean border and an eventual reunification of the peninsula. Additionally, the leaders agreed to work together to connect and modernize their railway systems.

Moon and Kim met a second time on 26 May, this time on the North Korean side of the Joint Security Area in the Unification Pavilion. This meeting was unannounced to the media prior, but focused on discussions around Kim's upcoming summit with United States President Donald Trump. The summit also resulted on an agreement to reopen a jointly operated liaison office in Kaesong that the South had shut down in February 2016 after a North Korean nuclear test. The office was operational from September 2018 to June 2020 and held many inter-Korean talks, until the building was demolished by North Korea amid rising tensions.

From 18 to 21 September, delegations from both countries met in Pyongyang, North Korea for the third and final summit between Moon and Kim. The summit resulted in agreement in a number of areas, including the removal of land mines and guard posts along areas of the Joint Security Area. North Korea agreed to dismantle their nuclear complex in the presence of international experts if the U.S. takes correlative action, although this never occurred. Moon became the first South Korean leader to give a public address in North Korea.

South Korea announced that it would not conduct annual military exercises with the US in September 2018, and would also stop its own drills in the Yellow Sea, in order to not provoke North Korea and to continue a peaceful dialog. On 1 July 2018 South and North Korea resumed ship-to-ship radio communication, which could prevent accidental clashes between South and North Korean military vessels around the Northern Limit Line (NLL) in the West (Yellow) Sea. On 17 July 2018, South and North Korea fully restored their military communication line on the western part of the peninsula.

Cultural exchanges were also an important aspect of normalizing relations. In preparation for the 2018 Winter Olympics, held in South Korea, North Korean leader Kim Jong Un proposed sending a delegation of athletes and officials. In the opening ceremonies, North and South Korea marched together under the Korean Unification Flag. At the games the two countries fielded a united women's ice hockey team. Apart from their athletic delegation, North Korea sent an unprecedented high-level political delegation. This delegation was headed by Kim Yo Jong, sister of Kim Jong Un, and President Kim Yong-nam, and included musical performers like the Samjiyon Orchestra. The arrival of Kim Yo Jong to the games marked the first time since the Korean War that a member of the Kim ruling dynasty entered South Korean territory. The delegation extended President Moon an invitation to visit North Korea. On 1 April 2018, South Korean K-pop stars performed a concert in Pyongyang entitled "Spring is Coming", which was attended by Kim Jong Un and his wife. In May 2018, North Korea adjusted its time zone to match the South's while the South began removing propaganda loudspeakers from the border area in line with the Panmunjom Declaration.

In recognition of President Moon Jae-in's attempts to restart engagement with North Korea and cooperate with Washington, Moon's return to the Sunshine Policy is sometimes referred to as "Moonshine Policy". While Moon is commended for his attempts at seeking peace for the peninsula, increased military hostility from South Korea and the United States has soured inter-Korean relations since 2019. Denuclearization of North Korea has also made little progress since 2019, while weapons testing has increased.

However, by 2020, negotiations almost completely stalled without progress on denuclearization, with both Trump and Kim focusing on domestic issues. The North Korean foreign ministry criticized the Trump administration that year for "empty promise[s]", and further took action by demolishing the four-story joint-liaison office building it shared with South Korea on June 17.

== Support groups ==
=== Political parties ===
- Democratic Party of Korea
- "Participation faction" (참여계) of the Justice Party
- Minsaeng Party
- People's Democracy Party
- Progressive Party

=== Other ===
- Hyundai Asan
- Korean Confederation of Trade Unions
  - Korean Teachers and Education Workers Union
- Minbyun

== See also ==
- Korean reunification
- North Korea–South Korea relations
- Korean Peninsula Energy Development Organization
- Nordpolitik
