= Inter-Korean Liaison Office bombing =

- Part of the Korean conflict
- Location: 37°55′58.7″N 126°37′18.7″E; Inter-Korean Liaison Office, Kaesong Industrial Region, North Korea
- Date: 16 June 2020
- Attack type: Demolition
- Perpetrator: Kim Yo Jong
- Motive: North Korea claims South Korea violated Article 2(1) of the Panmunjom Declaration
- Verdict: Inter-Korean Liaison Office bombed Korean relations deteriorate, Korean Peninsula tense

The Inter-Korean Liaison Office bombing (Korean: 남북공동연락사무소 폭파사건; lit. 'Inter-Korean Liaison Office Demolition Incident') occurred on 16 June 2020, when the Inter-Korean Liaison Office, located in Kaesong, North Korea, was demolished by the Korean People's Army.

The two Koreas decided to close the office on 30 January in response to the COVID-19 pandemic, and South Korean staff left the same day. Before the incident, North Korean leader Kim Jong-Un's sister Kim Yo Jong blamed North Korean defectors in South Korea for spreading leaflets across the Korean Demilitarized Zone, which North Korea said violated the Panmunjom Declaration. This incident worsened inter-Korean relations.

== Background ==
Following the signing of the Panmunjom Declaration at the April 2018 inter-Korean summit, North Korea and South Korea agreed to establish a "permanent liaison office". Originally scheduled to open in August 2018, the opening of the Inter-Korean Liaison Office was delayed until 14 September, following a visit to North Korea by United States Secretary of State Mike Pompeo. Although operations at the office faced a long-term suspension following the breakdown of the 2019 North Korea–United States Hanoi Summit, twice-daily communications between liaison officers continued.

On 30 January 2020, both nations agreed to suspend operations at the offices in response to the COVID-19 pandemic, and South Korean staff left that day. The South Korean Ministry of Unification stated that the relevant personnel were relocated to Seoul so that operations could continue after the closure.

=== North Korea's dissatisfaction with South Korea's actions ===
On 4 June 2020, Kim Yo Jong, an alternate member of the Political Bureau of the Central Committee of the Workers' Party of Korea and the First Deputy Director of the Organization and Guidance Department, said that the Democratic People's Republic of Korea (DPRK) was dissatisfied with a group of defectors sending 500,000 leaflets, 50 manuals, 2,000 $1 bills, and 1,000 memory cards along the Korean Demilitarized Zone on 31 May toward the DPRK, and demanded to immediately improve the situation. Subsequently, a spokesman for the United Front Department of the Workers' Party of Korea unilaterally announced the closure of the Inter-Korean Liaison Office the following day. Kim Yong-chol, vice chairman of the Central Committee of the Workers' Party of Korea, pointed out at a central government meeting that the dissemination of the leaflets was a hostile act in violation of the inter-Korean peace agreement, and therefore cut off all communication channels with the Korean authorities on 9 June.

On 12 June, Kwon Jeong-geun, the Director General of United States Affairs of the Ministry of Foreign Affairs of North Korea, condemned the remarks made by the South Korean side regarding efforts for the DPRK–US dialogue and denuclearization. Jang Kum-chol, the Head of the United Front Department, also issued a statement stating that he felt distrust of the inaction of the South Korean government. Subsequently, in a speech on 13 June, Kim Yo Jong once again criticized South Korea for ignoring bilateral relations and conniving with defectors, saying that it was "the time to say goodbye" to the South Korean government and authorizing the Korean People's Army to decide on a continuation of the enemy's actions. Kim Yo Jong also pointed out in her speech on the same day that "in the near future, the useless joint liaison office between the North and the South will disappear".

=== South Korea's response ===
After the South Korean government was informed of the North's dissatisfaction, Ministry of Unification spokesman Roh Sang-ki said at a regular press conference on 4 June that the act of spreading anti-DPRK leaflets threatened the safety of people and property in the border area and that the government was studying an effective plan in this regard and called on people not to spread anti-DPRK leaflets at the border. On the same day, the South Korean Ministry of National Defense spokesman Choi Hyun-soo said at a regular press conference that the South Korean government has not changed its position on the implementation of the Pyongyang Joint Declaration, which was signed by the two Koreas on 19 September 2018, in response to the North's unilateral threat to dismantle the agreement.

At a regular press conference in the morning of 8 June, the Ministry of Unification said that according to the routine business arrangement of the Inter-Korean Liaison Office, the two Koreas talk once a day in the morning and once in the afternoon, but in the morning of that day, the North did not answer the phone, which was the first time that the North did not answer the phone after the establishment of the office in 2018. On the following day, a regular press conference of the Ministry of Unification stated that the DPRK answered the phone on the afternoon of the 8 June, but did not mention why they did not take the call in the morning and said that the two sides should maintain communication channels. The North Korean government subsequently cut all communication channels with the South Korean authorities on 9 June, and the South Korean Ministry of Foreign Affairs held a press conference that afternoon, saying that it would closely monitor changes in inter-Korean relations with the United States. In response to the unilateral cut-off, Blue House only said that the inter-Korean communication channels "should continue to be maintained and used according to a mutual agreement", prompting the opposition People Power Party to criticize the Moon Jae-in administration for adopting a low-profile toward North Korea and allowing North Korea to take advantage of it.

On 10 June, the South Korean Ministry of Foreign Affairs reported two groups of defectors who had violated the regulations on the distribution of leaflets to the DPRK under the Korean Exchange and Cooperation Act and decided to cancel their registration licenses. On 14 June, the South Korean government expressed concern over Kim's remarks, and the Ministry of National Defense held an emergency meeting at the Blue House on the same morning to check the military's readiness and discuss how to deal with North Korea.

== Events ==
Yonhap News Agency quoted sources as saying that the South Korean government observed vehicles suspected of carrying explosives at the inter-Korean Joint Liaison Office after Kim and Jung spoke on 13 June. The South Korean military observed flames on the first and second floors of the office the following day.

On the morning of 16 June, the General Staff Department of the Korean People's Army issued a communiqué stating that it is fully prepared for the ongoing deterioration of inter-Korean relations and that it has firmly guaranteed any external measures taken by the party and the government from a military perspective. In response, South Korean Defense Ministry spokesman Choi Hyun-soo stressed at a regular press conference that the South Korean military is on alert to deal with any situation at any time, and said the South Korean side will work closely with the U.S. to keep a close watch and track the movement of the North Korean forces. The government then observed a loud noise and smoke coming from the Kaesong Industrial Region in the afternoon, and the military immediately checked whether it was related to the demolition of the Inter-Korean Liaison Office, and said it was stepping up its surveillance and alert of the North Korean side, while asking the frontline commander to take up his position to command the border guard force. The Republic of Korea Army confirmed through visual observation that the Inter-Korean Liaison Office building in the Kaesong industrial area had been blown up, and the North Korean authorities later confirmed that the General Staff Department of the Korean People's Army had given orders to the mission unit to blow up the Inter-Korean Liaison Office at 2:49 p.m. Pyongyang time, saying through the official media, Korean Central Broadcasting Station, that this was in response to the public opinion of the North Korean people.

After the destruction of the office, the North Korean authorities said that they will redeploy military forces to the Kaesong industrial area and the Geumgang Mountain International Tourism Special Zone at the border, and reestablish posts and restart military drills. In response to the North Korean government's statement, the chief of the Joint Chiefs of Staff, Jeon Dong-jin, said that he will closely monitor the North Korean government's movement 24 hours a day and will respond strongly if provoked by military actions. South Korean president Moon Jae-in convened a plenary session of the National Security Council after learning of the destruction of the office, the ninth time since he took power. After the meeting, Kim Yoo-geun, secretary general of the National Security Council, said that the DPRK's action completely failed to meet the expectations of everyone who is looking forward to the development of inter-Korean relations and permanent peace on the Korean peninsula, and made it clear that the DPRK should be held responsible for all consequences arising from it. In regards to the North's bombing of the office, Yoon Do-han, chief secretary for national communications at Blue House, said that the South Korean government has not received any plans or notifications.

The South Korean diplomatic personnel dormitory adjacent to the office was also affected by the impact of the explosion, resulting in a collapse of the outer wall of the dormitory. According to the photos taken by the television station, Korean Broadcasting System, on 17 June at a height of about 2000 meters in the no-fly zone along the military demarcation line, it was also found that the comprehensive support center for the Kaesong Industrial Area near the office was also affected and seriously damaged. On 19 June, South Korean government sources told the JoongAng Ilbo that after analyzing the images of the South Korean army and the North Korean official media, it was found that the TNT explosives set up by the North Korean explosion should amount to hundreds of kilograms.

== Aftermath ==
=== Inter-Korean relations ===
On 15 June, South Korean president Moon Jae-in, proposed to North Korea to send Chung Eui-yong, the director of the Office of National Security, and Suh Hoon, the director of the National Intelligence Service, as special envoys to meet with North Korean leader Kim Jong Un, but on 17 June, North Korea rejected the proposal. In response to North Korea's unilateral message that it wanted to send envoys, Moon said that although the act was a bit too much, he would continue to explore ways to break through the Korean impasse to keep persuading North Korea and the United States. Under the situation where relations between North and South Korea continue to deteriorate, South Korean Minister of Unification Kim Yeon-chul resigned on 17 June taking responsibility for the degradation of inter-Korean relations. The spokesman of the Blue House, Kang Min Seok, said in a press conference on the morning of 19 June that Moon Jae-in agreed to his resignation and said that Moon Jae-in had dinner with Kim Yeon-chul on the evening of 18 June and listened to Kim Yeon-chul's position.

After the North Korean government bombed the office, United Front Department head Kim Yong-chol said that there would be no more exchanges, cooperations or even talks between the two Koreas in the future, adding that "everything that has happened between the two sides should be treated as a dream", while the North Korean government continued to push forward military measures and said through the official media that it had prepared more than 3,000 balloons and 12 million leaflets for "retaliatory punishment". The leaflets were published with a picture of Moon drinking tea, a string of mocking words and a lot of smoked cigarette butts on the end. The South Korean military said it will pay close attention to how the North Koreans act and the way they take action, and then return with any possible military response. The South Korean military also found that the North Korean government has reinstalled loudspeakers for "psychological warfare" in non-military areas, indicating that the two sides' previous efforts to improve relations have returned to square one.

North Korean leader Kim Jong Un presided over the preparatory meeting of the 5th meeting of the Central Military Commission on 23 June and decided to suspend the implementation of the military action plan. Some official media also deleted critical reports on the South Korean authorities. JoongAng Ilbo pointed out that North Korea had observed the dismantling and reinstallation of loudspeakers at the Peace Observatory in Ganghwa County, Incheon Prefecture, while South Korean Congressman Kim Yong Ho expressed through the media, Suh Ho, South Korea's Deputy Minister of Unification, confirmed that the DPRK had completely removed loudspeakers in the border areas when attending a private forum of the National Committee on Foreign Affairs Unification. After the suspension of critical reporting, the North Korean official media had not published any reports directly criticizing the South Korean government as of 5 July. The North Korean foreign media only resumed writing articles criticizing the South Korean military and political parties on 26 June.

On 25 June, the 70th anniversary of the Korean War, South Korean president Moon Jae-in gave a speech, saying that he would protect the lives and security of his people at all costs and that Seoul has a strong all-round national defense force that will not tolerate any provocation, the first warning message to Pyongyang authorities since Moon took office. The North Korean Foreign Ministry's Institute for Disarmament and Peace Research released a research report on the same day, saying that the withdrawal of the U.S. policy of hostility towards North Korea is the prerequisite for maintaining peace on the Korean Peninsula, and that the U.S. started the Korean War to cause the pain of national division on the Korean Peninsula, which is why North Korea is determined to take the path of nuclear self-defense. South Korean Defense Minister Jeong Kyeong-doo and U.S. Defense Secretary Mark Esper issued a joint statement on the same day, calling on the North Korean authorities to exercise self-restraint and decide to maintain peace and security in Northeast Asia through trilateral and multilateral security cooperation between South Korea, the United States and Japan.

On 8 July, South Korean lawyer Lee Kyung-jae filed a lawsuit against Kim Woong-jung and Park Jung-tien, the chief of staff of the Korean People's Army, for damaging Korean public property. Lee Kyung-jae said that although the Korean government cannot actually punish Kim and Park, it wants to show the Korean people the hypocrisy of their leaders.

On 27 July 2021, Park Soo-hyun, chief secretary for national communication at the Blue House in South Korea, said that the communication channel between the DPRK and the Republic of Korea (ROK) was restored and that this is the first time that the leaders of both sides have reached an agreement on restarting the communication channel after repeatedly discussing the restoration of North Korea–South Korea relations through correspondence since April 2021. The Korean Central News Agency (KCNA) also issued a communiqué on the same day. After the interruption of the communication channel between the two Koreas, the DPRK side had not responded to the daily messages sent to the ROK side through the International Merchant Marine Network (IMN), but seven days after the restoration of the communication channel, the DPRK side responded to the IMN calls, which also led to the full restoration of the military communication channel between the two Koreas. On 1 August, Kim Woong-jung, vice minister of the Central Committee of the Workers' Party of Korea.

In an authorized statement on 10 August, Kim Woong-jung, vice minister of the Central Committee of the Workers' Party of Korea, said that the DPRK was "strongly dismayed by the treacherous behavior of the South Korean authorities" as the U.S. and South Korea insisted on starting joint military exercises that further aggravated the unstable situation despite the unanimous condemnation and opposition from inside and outside. Then, at 5 p.m. that day, the DPRK side did not answer the routine phone calls made by the South Korean side through the liaison office channel and the East-West Sea military communication line, cutting off the communication channel again after only 14 days, which had been restored on 27 July. On the following day, Kim Yong-chol, the Head of the United Front Department, issued a statement through the KCNA, saying that the Korean side had given up the opportunity to improve inter-Korean relations and had reciprocated the North's goodwill with hostile acts, pointing out that Kim Woong-jung, the deputy minister of the Central Committee, had been commissioned by the party's Central Committee to issue a statement on the first day as an opportunity for the North to give the Korean side a choice. In this regard, the Ministry of Unification issued a position on the same day after consolidating the positions of relevant departments, saying that it is not in the interest of any party to aggravate tensions on the Korean peninsula and urging the DPRK to restart dialogue as soon as possible, and that the ROK will not prejudge the direction of the DPRK's response in the future, but will continue to pay close attention to relevant movements.

On 29 September, Kim Jong Un delivered a policy speech on "the current direction of struggle for new development of socialist construction" at the 5th session of the 14th Supreme People's Assembly, pointing out that the pipeline between the two sides is expected to be restored in early October of the same year. The government's position on the issue was published by the Unification Ministry. On 4 October, the KCNA issued a communiqué stating that all communication lines were reopened at 9:00 p.m. that day, and that the relevant South Korean authorities should be aware of the significance of the reopening. The Ministry of Unification also confirmed on the same day that the North-South Joint Liaison Office and the South Korean military had resumed normal bilateral communication, while Blue House did not formally state its position on the resumption of communication between the two sides, but only responded to the position expressed by the Ministry of Unification and the Ministry of National Defense.

=== Japanese and U.S. response ===
On 16 June, Japanese prime minister Shinzo Abe, said he would "work closely with South Korea and the United States and analyze intelligence to respond" after being informed of the bombing of the inter-Korean liaison office, while the Chief Cabinet Secretary Yoshihide Suga said at a press conference on 17 June that the Japanese government was very concerned about North Korea's actions and that it was "maintaining the necessary alert posture to be fully prepared for all incidents.

The United States Department of State issued a statement saying that the North Korean authorities should avoid further counterproductive actions and said it decided to extend sanctions against North Korea for one year, the fourth time since President Donald Trump took office, because North Korea's actions and policies continue to pose "an unusual and extraordinary threat" to U.S. national security, foreign policy and the economy. The U.S. Department of Defense said it will actively discuss with South Korea the feasibility of joint military exercises.

South Korean military sources pointed out on June 17 that U.S. Navy EP-3E electronic reconnaissance aircraft and U.S. Army RC-12X reconnaissance aircraft stationed in Korea were flying over the Korean Capital Territory on that day to implement surveillance and reconnaissance missions against North Korea. A military aircraft tracking site said the U.S. Air Force RC-135W reconnaissance aircraft in the morning of the 18th over the Korean capital circle. On June 22, the military aircraft tracking website also pointed out that two B-52 Stratospheric Fortress bombers were observed flying from Alaska's Aisin base to the Philippine Sea via Japan, which was seen as a measure to warn the North Korean side. The U.S. Air Force released photos of a joint elephant walk exercise with the Japanese Air Self-Defense Force at Misawa Airfield in Aomori Prefecture on the 23rd.

=== Other reactions ===
Following the bombing of the North-South Joint Liaison Office, Kremlin spokesman Dmitry Peskov issued a statement expressing concern about the situation on the Korean Peninsula and calling on both Koreas to remain calm, but at this stage the Russian government has no plans to help ease tensions on the Korean Peninsula. The European Union issued a statement on the matter, stating that it deeply regretted the recent actions of North Korea and said that the Pyongyang authorities should refrain from further provocative and destructive actions. The EU reiterated its support for the South Korean government's efforts to achieve peace and prosperity on the peninsula and the need to reignite dialogue between the parties, according to a joint press release issued after a video conference between European Council President Charles Michel and European Commission President Ursula von der Leyen on 30 June and South Korean President Moon Jae-in.

The Ministry of Foreign Affairs of China said it is working with the government of South Korea to improve the relationship between the two countries, and to maintain peace and stability on the Korean Peninsula. Taiwanese president Tsai Ing-wen, said that the government of the Republic of China is closely concerned about the development of the border conflict between China and India and the tension on the Korean Peninsula. The government has also issued a statement saying that the national security team is closely monitoring the latest developments and is in constant contact with all relevant countries.

== Related disputes ==
=== Airborne flyers controversial content ===
It was pointed out that the flyer floated to North Korea was related to the malicious photograph manipulation of Kim Jong Un's wife, Ri Sol-ju, as the protagonist of a pornographic film, and that South Korean netizens did not approve of the flyer's content and considered it crazy and bad. The named "Free Korean Movement Alliance" said that the leaflet was not produced by it, and pointed out that the leaflet had appeared in 2013. According to a check by the Korean media outlet World Journal, it was confirmed that the malicious leaflet was put out by extreme conservative groups such as Pyongyang Citizens' Association and Blue Union in October 2013 when Park Geun-hye was in power.

=== Concerns about violations of free speech ===
On 17 June, the Ministry of Unification officially revoked the permission for the establishment of the "Free North Korea Movement Alliance" and "Daechuan", a group of North Korean defector groups. The government also said that the groups are not in line with the purpose of their establishment, but also endanger the safety of residents in the border areas of Korea and North Korea, and aggravate the tension in the peninsula, which is detrimental to national interests. The U.S. government is of the opinion that South Korea is giving in to North Korea's demands and abandoning its dignity as an exemplary democracy.

== Subsequent actions ==
=== Propaganda Prohibition Act Against North Korea ===
On 3 December 2020, the ruling Democratic Party sent a draft of the Propaganda Prohibition Act Against North Korea to the National Assembly for scrutiny, which covers the prohibition of propaganda shouting through leaflets and loudspeakers against the North Korean side in border areas. The bill was strongly supported by the Democratic Party and suppresses the opposition's views, causing dissatisfaction among the opposition parties in South Korea. U.S. Republican Party Congressman Chris Smith expressed concern over the implementation of the bill by the National Assembly. In response to concerns about infringement of freedom of speech, South Korean Foreign Minister Kang Kyung-wha said in an interview with CNN that freedom of speech is crucial to human rights, but it does not mean that it is unquestionable, but needs to be restricted.

After the bill was passed on 14 December, Fighters for a Free North Korea, a North Korean defector group, said it would file a lawsuit against the bill for unconstitutionality. The U.S.-based Human Rights Foundation stated that it had sent letters to the National Assembly, the Ministry of Foreign Affairs, the Ministry of Unification, the ruling Democratic Party and the opposition People Power Party before the 9 December debate on the bill, stating that the bill infringes on freedom of speech and is unconstitutional. Human Rights Watch called the bill a misguided strategy to win the favor of Kim Jong Un. After the passage of the bill, the Ministry of Unification said that although freedom of speech is provided for in the South Korean Constitution, the safety of people's lives at the border is more important, and pointed out that the new law only restricts some forms of freedom of speech at a minimum.

At the end of March 2021, the amended Propaganda Prohibition Act Against North Korea came into effect, which prohibits the delivery of anti-North Korean leaflets and loudspeaker shouting along the military demarcation line. The South Korean Ministry of Foreign Affairs said that the hearing did not affect the South Korea-U.S. alliance, and pointed out that the Korean government will continue to introduce the purpose of the law to the U.S. Congress, the U.S. State Department and human rights groups and other relevant parties, and strive for the Korean government's position to be fully reflected in this hearing.

In response to the South Korean government's amendment, the Office of the United Nations High Commissioner for Human Rights wrote to the South Korean government expressing concern about the negative impact of the law on the right to freedom of expression and the legitimate activities of some civil society groups and human rights advocates in South Korea, and requesting information on whether the amendment complies with international human rights law and the scope of illegal activities under the amendment. The UN Special Rapporteur on North Korea, Tomás Ojea Quintana, said last December that he had recommended that South Korea reconsider the amendment in accordance with the due process of the relevant democratic institutions before implementing the law. In protest, the Alliance for a Free North Korea Movement, a group of defectors, again dropped 500,000 flyers from April 25 to 29 along the military demarcation line from Paju City, Gyeonggi Province, to Gangwon Province. Ultimately, the bill was declared unconstitutional by the Constitutional Court of Korea on 26 September 2023.

=== Compensation ===
On 14 June 2023, the South Korean Ministry of Unification filed a lawsuit against North Korea in the Seoul Central District Court, demanding compensation of 44.7 billion won for the losses caused to South Korea by the related incidents. On 16 September 2026, the Seoul Central District Court ruled in favor of the South Korean government, ordering North Korea to pay the full 44.6 billion won sought by South Korea. The Ministry of Unification said that respected the court's ruling and would review necessary follow-up measures.

== See also ==
- Korean reunification
- Korean conflict
- Balloon propaganda campaigns in Korea
