= North Korea–South Korea relations =

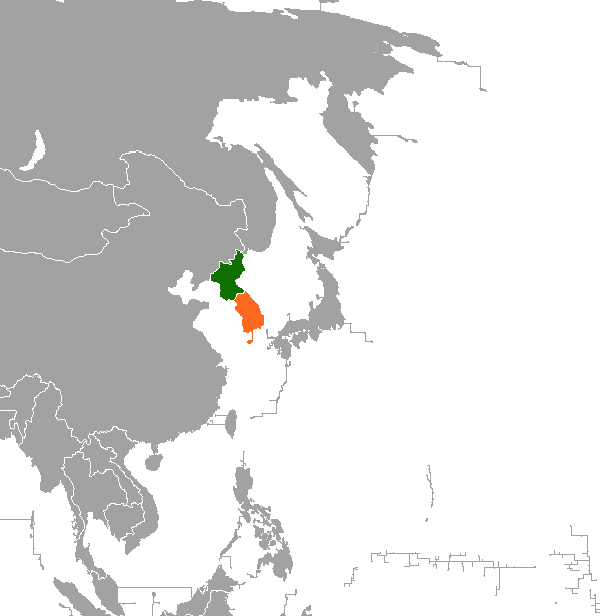

- North Korea: South Korea

- South Korean name
- Hangul: 남북관계
- Hanja: 南北關係
- Lit.: South–North relations
- RR: Nambuk gwangye
- MR: Nambuk kwan'gye

North Korean name (Prior to 2024)
- Hangul: 북남관계
- Hanja: 北南關係
- Lit.: North–South relations
- RR: Bungnam gwangye
- MR: Pungnam kwan'gye

North Korean name (Since 2024)
- Hangul: 조한관계
- Hanja: 朝韓關係
- Lit.: Chosŏn–Han'guk relations
- RR: Johan gwangye
- MR: Chohan kwan'gye

Formerly a single nation that was annexed by Japan in 1910, the Korean Peninsula was divided into occupation zones since the end of World War II on 2 September 1945. The two sovereign countries were founded in the North and South of the peninsula in 1948, leading to the formal division. Despite the separation, both have claimed sovereignty over all of Korea in their constitutions and both have used the name "Korea" in English. The two countries engaged in the Korean War from 1950 to 1953 which ended in an armistice agreement but without a peace treaty. North Korea is a one-party state run by the Kim family. South Korea was formerly governed by a succession of military dictatorships, save for a brief one-year democratic period from 1960 to 1961. This period of military rule lasted until thorough democratization in 1987, which followed the administrations of Park Chung-hee (1961-1979) and Chun Doo-hwan (1979-1987) and was brought about by the June Democratic Struggle and the June 29 Declaration, after which direct elections were held. South Korea continues to claim the entire Korean Peninsula and outlying islands, whereas North Korea abandoned its claim to the south in 2024 in accordance with its two hostile states theory. Both nations joined the United Nations in 1991 and are recognized by most member states. Since the 1970s, both nations have held informal diplomatic dialogues in order to ease military tensions.

In 2000, Kim Dae-jung became the first President of South Korea to visit North Korea, 55 years after the peninsula was divided. Under President Kim, South Korea adopted the Sunshine Policy in pursuit of more peaceful relationships with North Korea. The policy established the Kaesong Industrial Region, among other things. This policy was continued by the next president Roh Moo-hyun who also visited North Korea in 2007 and met with North Korean leader Kim Jong Il. Through this meeting both leaders signed a declaration to pursue peace and recover inter-Korean relations. However, faced with growing criticism, the Sunshine Policy was discontinued under the next two governments. During Lee Myung-bak and Park Geun-hye's presidencies, the relationship between North and South Korea became more hostile.

Under President Moon Jae-in, beginning with North Korea's participation in the 2018 Winter Olympics, the relationship saw a major diplomatic breakthrough and become significantly warmer. In April 2018, the two countries signed the Panmunjom Declaration. The summits between North and South Korea also facilitated positive relationships between North Korea and the United States. However, the negotiations stalled in 2020 and relations deteriorated, particularly during the presidency of Yoon Suk Yeol, with an increase in military tensions.

On 30 December 2023, Kim Jong Un declared peaceful reunification impossible, stating that North Korea was no longer "consanguineous or homogeneous" with South Korea and that the two Koreas had become two separate ethnic nations (minjok). Following this declaration, North Korea officially began referring to the South as "Hanguk" (endonym for South Korea) and characterizing inter-Korean relations as "Chosŏn-Hanguk relations (chohan kwan'gye)" rather than the traditional term "North-South relations." This underscores North Korea's policy of two hostile states theory which departs from its previous South Korea policies that were based on Korean ethnic nationalism. This political and cultural rupture was described as "de-ethnification" by the Daily NK.

== Division of Korea ==
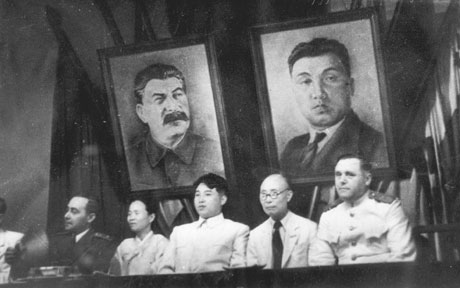
Kim Il Sung, amongst other Korean communists and Soviet representatives, at a conference in Pyongyang in 1946, seated under large portraits of Soviet leader Joseph Stalin and himself.

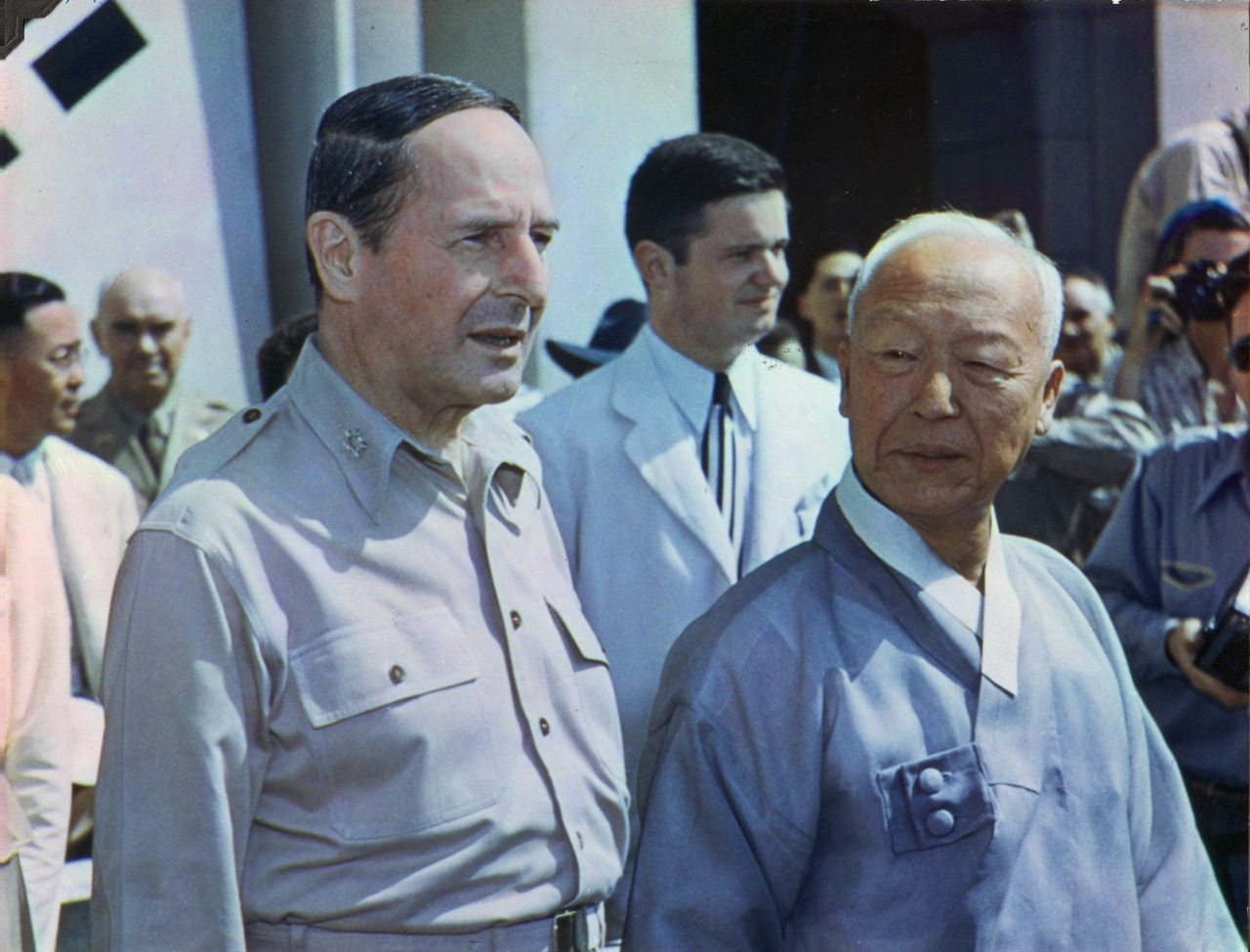
Syngman Rhee together with US general Douglas MacArthur at the grand ceremony inaugurating the government of the Republic of Korea (South Korea) in 1948.

The Korean peninsula was previously an independent state until 1897 when it declared independence from the Qing dynasty's tributary system. In 1905, the Korean Empire became a protectorate of Japan and later annexed into Japan in 1910 beginning its 35-year long colonial rule. On 9 August 1945, in the closing days of World War II, the Soviet Union declared war on Japan and advanced into Korea. Though the Soviet declaration of war had been agreed by the Allies at the Yalta Conference, the US government became concerned at the prospect of all of Korea falling under Soviet control. The US government therefore requested Soviet forces halt their advance at the 38th parallel north, leaving the south of the peninsula, including the capital, Seoul, to be occupied by the US. This was incorporated into General Order No. 1 to Japanese forces after the Surrender of Japan on 15 August. On 24 August, the Red Army entered Pyongyang and established a military government over Korea north of the parallel. American forces landed in the south on 8 September and established the United States Army Military Government in Korea.

The Allies had originally envisaged a joint trusteeship which would steer Korea towards independence, but most Korean nationalists wanted independence immediately. Meanwhile, the wartime co-operation between the Soviet Union and the US deteriorated as the Cold War took hold. Both occupying powers began promoting into positions of authority Koreans aligned with their side of politics and marginalizing their opponents. Many of these emerging political leaders were returning exiles with little popular support. In North Korea, the Soviet Union supported Korean Communists. Kim Il Sung, who from 1941 had served in the Soviet Army, became the major political figure. Society was centralized and collectivized, following the Soviet model. Politics in the South was more tumultuous, but the strongly anti-Communist Syngman Rhee emerged as the most prominent politician.

The US government took the issue to the United Nations, which led to the formation of the United Nations Temporary Commission on Korea (UNTCOK) in 1947. The Soviet Union opposed this move and refused to allow UNTCOK to operate in the North. UNTCOK organized a general election in the South, which was held on 10 May 1948. The Democratic People's Republic of Korea was declared on 10 July, with Kim Il Sung as prime minister appointed on 9 September and the Soviet occupational forces left the North on 10 December 1948. In the south, the Republic of Korea was established with Syngman Rhee as president, and formally replaced the US military occupation on 15 August and its troops withdrew from the South the following year, though the US Korean Military Advisory Group remained to train the Republic of Korea Army.

Both opposing governments considered themselves to be the government of the whole of Korea, and both saw the division as temporary. The DPRK proclaimed Seoul to be its official capital, a position not changed until 1972.

== Korean War ==
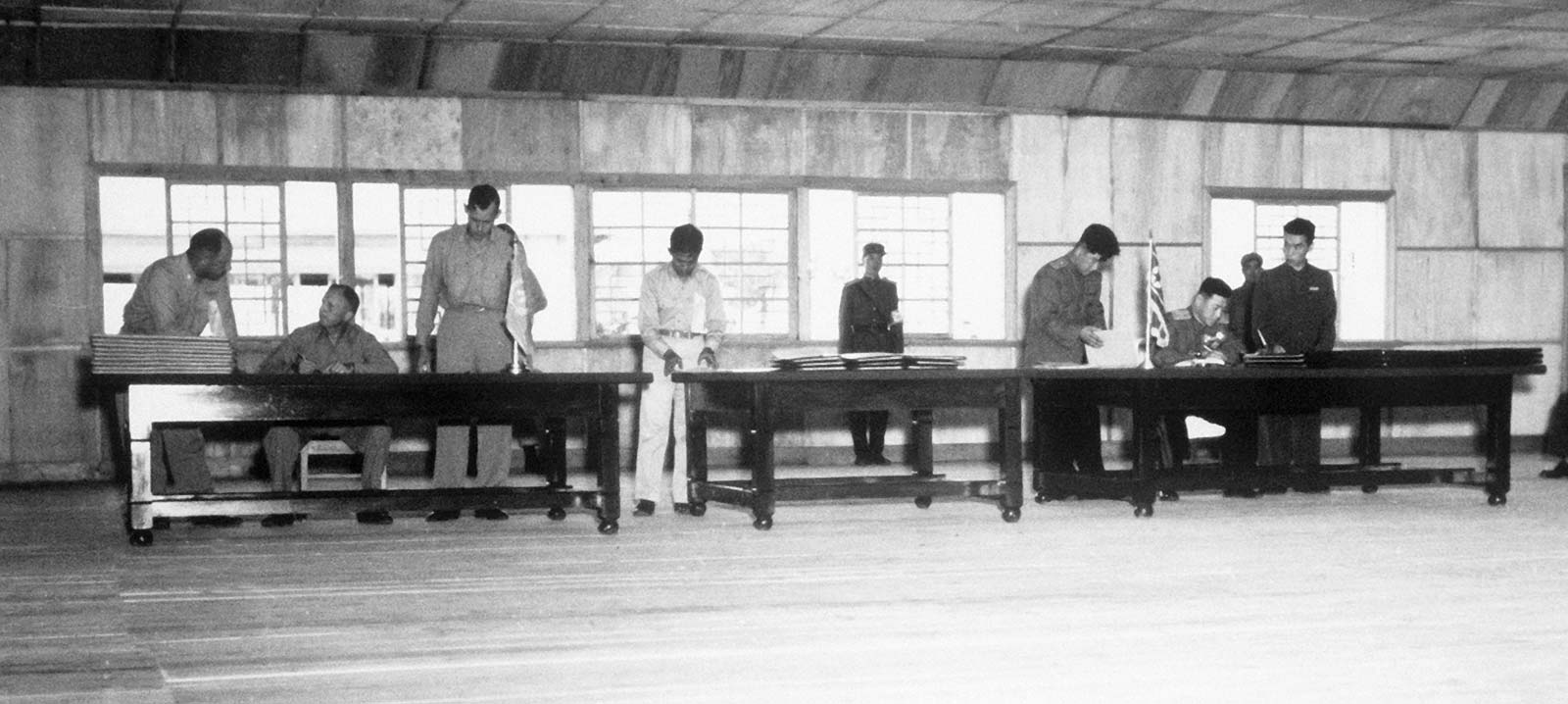
Delegates sign the Korean Armistice Agreement in P'anmunjŏm.

North Korea invaded the South on 25 June 1950, and swiftly overran most of the country. In September 1950 the United Nations force, led by the United States, intervened to defend the South, and advanced into North Korea. As they neared the border with China, Chinese forces intervened on behalf of North Korea, shifting the balance of the war again. Fighting ended on 27 July 1953, with an armistice that approximately restored the original boundaries between North and South Korea. Syngman Rhee refused to sign the armistice, but reluctantly agreed to abide by it. The armistice inaugurated an official ceasefire but did not lead to a peace treaty. It established the Korean Demilitarized Zone (DMZ), a buffer zone between the two sides, that intersected the 38th parallel but did not follow it. North Korea has announced that it will no longer abide by the armistice at least six times, in the years 1994, 1996, 2003, 2006, 2009, and 2013.

Large numbers of people were displaced as a result of the war, and many families were divided by the reconstituted border. In 2007 it was estimated that around 750,000 people remained separated from immediate family members, and family reunions have long been a diplomatic priority for the South.

== Cold War ==
Competition between North and South Korea became key to decision-making on both sides. For example, the construction of the Pyongyang Metro spurred the construction of one in Seoul. In the 1980s, the South Korean government built a 98m tall flagpole in its village of Daeseong-dong in the DMZ. In response, North Korea built a 160m tall flagpole in its nearby village of Kijŏng-dong.

Tensions escalated in the late 1960s with a series of low-level armed clashes known as the Korean DMZ Conflict. During this time, North and South Korea conducted covert raids on each other in a series of retaliatory strikes, which included assassination attempts on the South and North leaders. On 21 January 1968, North Korean commandos attacked the South Korean Blue House. On 11 December 1969, a South Korean airliner was hijacked.

During preparations for US President Nixon's visit to China in 1972, South Korean President Park Chung Hee initiated covert contact with the North's Kim Il Sung. In August 1971, the first Red Cross talks between North and South Korea were held. Many of the participants were really intelligence or party officials. In May 1972, Lee Hu-rak, the director of the Korean Central Intelligence Agency (KCIA), secretly met with Kim Il Sung in Pyongyang. Kim apologized for the Blue House Raid, denying he had approved it. In return, North Korea's deputy premier Pak Song Chol made a secret visit to Seoul. On 4 July 1972, the North-South Joint Statement was issued. The statement announced the Three Principles of Reunification: first, reunification must be solved independently without interference from or reliance on foreign powers; second, reunification must be realized in a peaceful way without use of armed forces against each other; finally, reunification transcend the differences of ideologies and institutions to promote the unification of Korea as one ethnic group. It also established the first "hotline" between the two sides.

North Korea suspended talks in 1973 after the kidnapping of South Korean opposition leader Kim Dae-jung by the KCIA. Talks restarted, however, and between 1973 and 1975 there were 10 meetings of the North-South Coordinating Committee at Panmunjom.

In the late 1970s, US President Jimmy Carter hoped to achieve peace in Korea. However, his plans were derailed because of the unpopularity of his proposed withdrawal of troops.

In 1983, a North Korean proposal for three-way talks with the United States and South Korea coincided with the Rangoon assassination attempt against the South Korean President. This contradictory behavior has never been explained.

In September 1984, North Korea's Red Cross sent emergency supplies to the South after severe floods. Talks resumed, resulting in the first reunion of separated families in 1985, as well as a series of cultural exchanges. Goodwill dissipated with the staging of the US-South Korean military exercise, Team Spirit, in 1986.

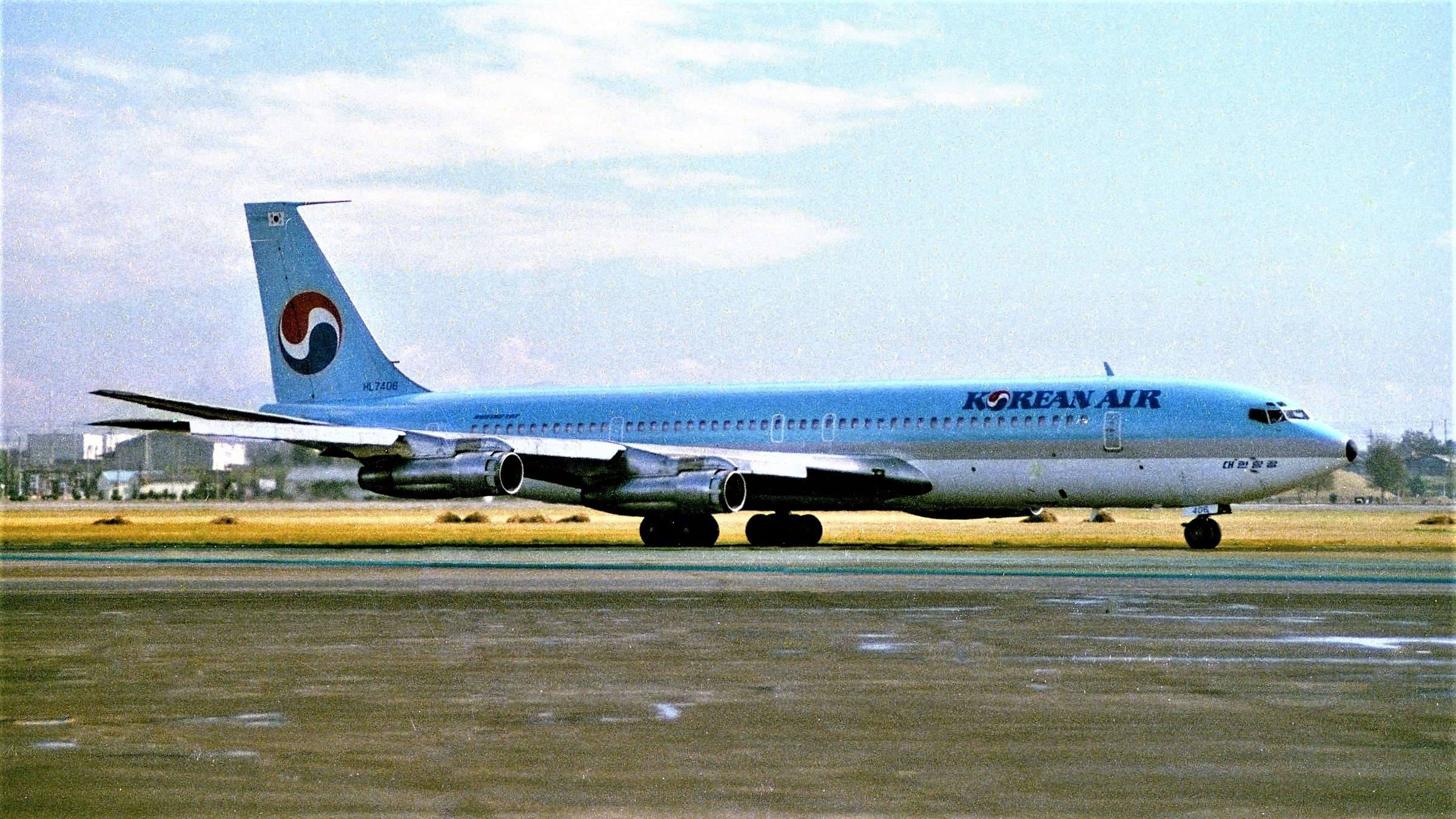
The aircraft involved in the bombing of Korean Air Flight 858, HL7406, seen one month before the destruction

Korean Unification Flag

When Seoul was chosen to host the 1988 Summer Olympics, North Korea tried to arrange a boycott by its Communist allies or a joint hosting of the Games. This failed, and the bombing of Korean Air Flight 858 in 1987 was seen as North Korea's revenge. However, at the same time, amid a global thawing of the Cold War, the newly elected South Korean President Roh Tae-woo launched a diplomatic initiative known as Nordpolitik. This proposed the interim development of a "Korean Community", which was similar to a North Korean proposal for a confederation. From 4 to 7 September 1990, high-level talks were held in Seoul, at the same time that the North was protesting about the Soviet Union normalizing relations with the South. These talks led in 1991 to the Agreement on Reconciliation, Non-Aggression, Exchanges and Cooperation and the Joint Declaration of the Denuclearization of the Korean Peninsula. This coincided with the admission of both North and South Korea into the United Nations. Meanwhile, on 25 March 1991, a unified Korean team first used the Korean Unification Flag at the World Table Tennis Competition in Japan, and on 6 May 1991, a unified team competed at the World Youth Football Competition in Portugal.

There were limits to the thaw in relations, however. In 1989, Lim Su-kyung, a South Korean student activist who participated in the World Youth Festival in Pyongyang, was jailed on her return.

== Sunshine and shadow ==
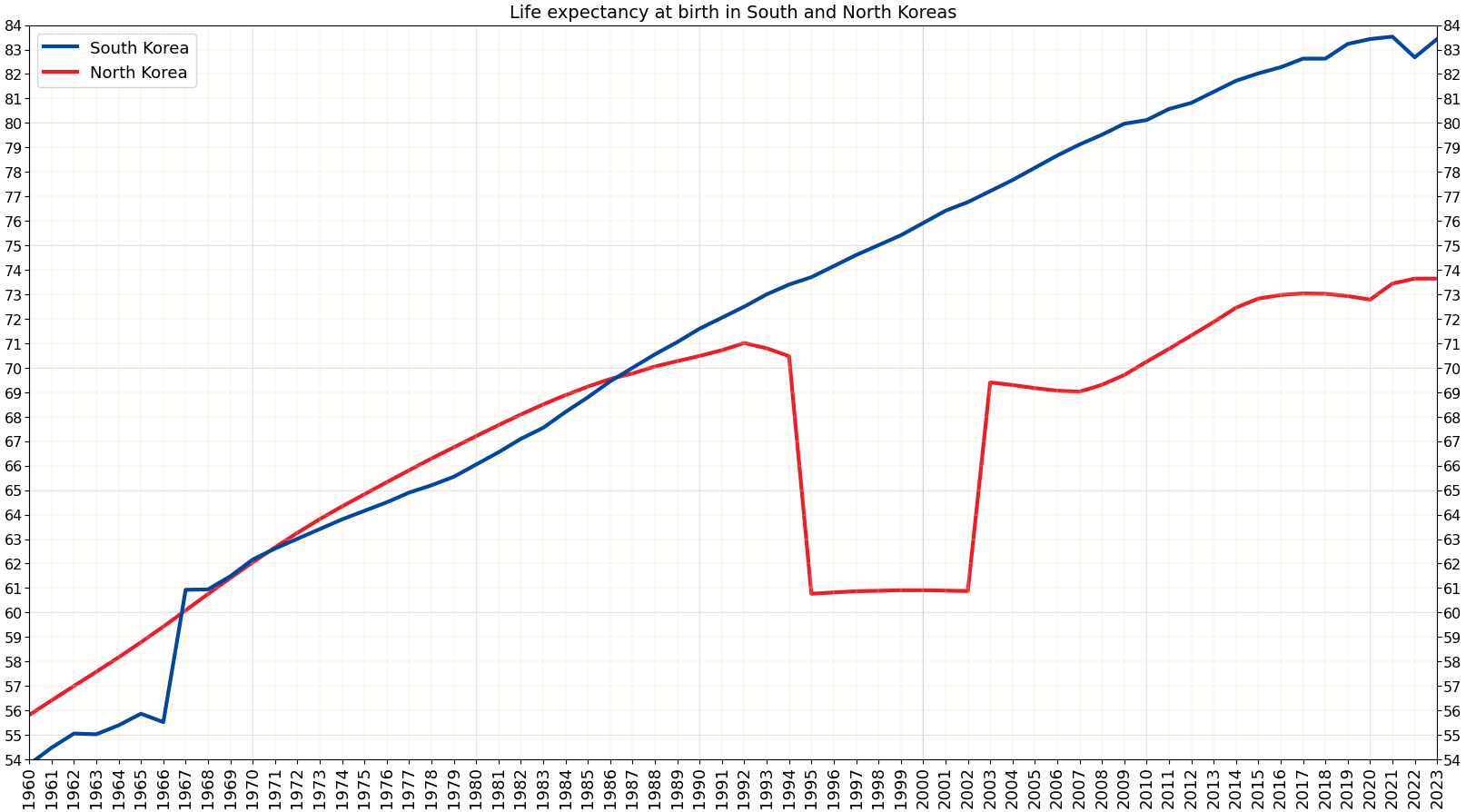
Comparison of life expectancy in South and North Koreas

The end of the Cold War brought economic crisis to North Korea and led to expectations that reunification was imminent. North Koreans began to flee to the South in increasing numbers. According to official statistics there were 561 defectors living in South Korea in 1995, and over 10,000 in 2007.

In December 1991 both states made an accord, the Agreement on Reconciliation, Non-Aggression, Exchange and Cooperation, pledging non-aggression and cultural and economic exchanges. They also agreed on prior notification of major military movements and established a military hotline, and are working on replacing the armistice with a "peace regime".

In 1994, concern over North Korea's nuclear program led to the Agreed Framework between the US and North Korea.

In 1998, South Korean President Kim Dae-jung announced a Sunshine Policy towards North Korea. Despite a naval clash in 1999, this led in June 2000, to the first Inter-Korean summit, between Kim Dae-jung and Kim Jong Il. As a result, Kim Dae-jung was awarded the Nobel Peace Prize. The summit was followed in August by a family reunion. In September, the North and South Korean teams marched together at the Sydney Olympics. Trade increased to the point where South Korea became North Korea's largest trading partner. Starting in 1998, the Mount Kumgang Tourist Region was developed as a joint venture between the North Korean government and Hyundai. In 2003, the Kaesong Industrial Region was established to allow South Korean businesses to invest in the North. In the early 2000s South Korea ceased infiltrating its agents into the North.

US President George W Bush, however, did not support the Sunshine Policy and in 2002 branded North Korea as a member of an Axis of Evil.

Continuing concerns about North Korea's potential to develop nuclear missiles led in 2003 to the six-party talks that included North Korea, South Korea, the US, Russia, China, and Japan. In 2006, however, North Korea resumed testing missiles and on 9 October conducted its first nuclear test.

The 15 June 2000 Joint Declaration that the two leaders signed during the first South-North summit stated that they would hold the second summit at an appropriate time. It was originally envisaged that the second summit would be held in South Korea, but that did not happen. South Korean President Roh Moo-hyun walked across the DMZ on 2 October 2007 and traveled on to Pyongyang for talks with Kim Jong Il. The two sides reaffirmed the spirit of 15 June Joint Declaration and had discussions on various issues related to realizing the advancement of south–north relations, peace on the Korean Peninsula, common prosperity of the people and the unification of Korea. On 4 October 2007, South Korean President Roh Moo-hyun and North Korean leader Kim Jong Il signed a peace declaration. The document called for international talks to replace the Armistice which ended the Korean War with a permanent peace treaty.

During this period, political developments were reflected in art. The films Shiri, in 1999, and Joint Security Area, in 2000, gave sympathetic representations of North Koreans.

== Sunshine Policy ends ==
=== Lee Myung-bak government ===
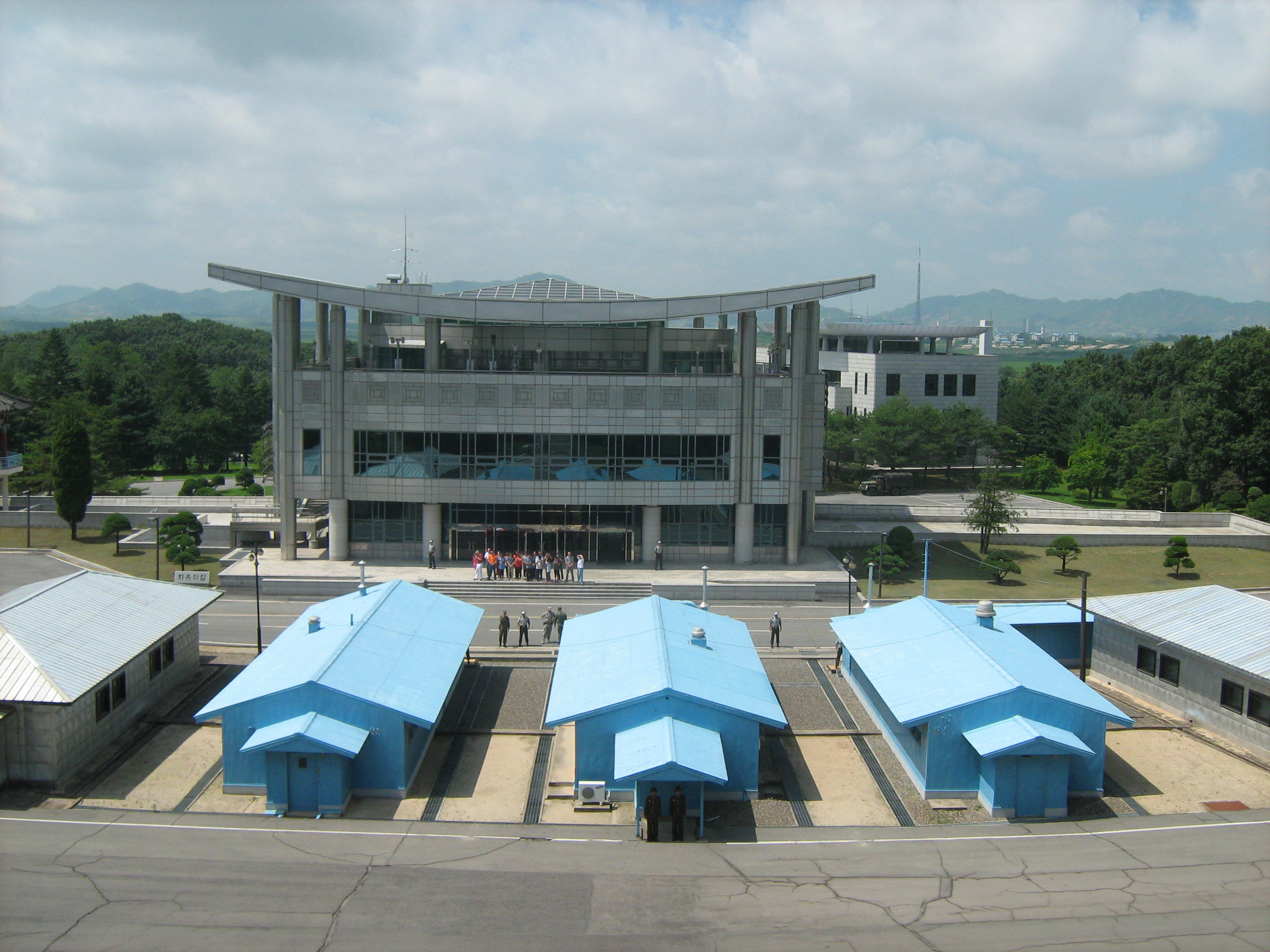
The Korean DMZ in 2012, viewed from the north.

The Sunshine Policy was formally abandoned by the new South Korean President Lee Myung-bak in 2010.

On 26 March 2010, the 1,500-ton ROKS Cheonan with a crew of 104, sank off Baengnyeongdo in the Yellow Sea. Seoul said there was an explosion at the stern, and was investigating whether a torpedo attack was the cause. Out of 104 sailors, 46 died and 58 were rescued. Lee convened an emergency meeting of security officials and ordered the military to focus on rescuing the sailors. On 20 May 2010, a team of international researchers published results claiming that the sinking had been caused by a North Korean torpedo; North Korea rejected the findings. South Korea agreed with the findings from the research group and Lee declared afterwards that Seoul would cut all trade with North Korea as part of measures primarily aimed at striking back at North Korea diplomatically and financially. North Korea denied all such allegations and responded by severing ties between the countries and announced it abrogated the previous non-aggression agreement.

On 23 November 2010, North Korea's artillery fired at South Korea's Yeonpyeong island in the Yellow Sea and South Korea returned fire. Two South Korean marines and two civilians were killed, more than a dozen were wounded, including three civilians. About 10 North Koreans were believed to have been killed; however, the North Korean government denies this. The town was evacuated and South Korea warned of stern retaliation, with Lee ordering the destruction of a nearby North Korea missile base if further provocation should occur. The official North Korean news agency, KCNA, stated that North Korea only fired after the South had "recklessly fired into our sea area".

In 2011 it was revealed that North Korea abducted four high-ranking South Korean military officers in 1999.

=== Park Geun-hye government ===
On 12 December 2012, North Korea launched the Kwangmyŏngsŏng-3 Unit 2, a scientific and technological satellite, and it reached orbit. In response, the United States deployed its warships in the region. January–September 2013 saw an escalation of tensions between North Korea and South Korea, the United States, and Japan that began because of United Nations Security Council Resolution 2087, which condemned North Korea for the launch of Kwangmyŏngsŏng-3 Unit 2. The crisis was marked by an extreme escalation of rhetoric by the new North Korean administration under Kim Jong Un and actions suggesting imminent nuclear attacks against South Korea, Japan, and the United States.

On 24 March 2014, a crashed North Korean drone was found near Paju, the onboard cameras contained pictures of the Blue House and military installations near the DMZ. On 31 March, following an exchange of artillery fire into the waters of the NLL, a North Korean drone was found crashed on Baengnyeongdo. On 15 September, wreckage of a suspected North Korean drone was found by a fisherman in the waters near Baengnyeongdo, the drone was reported to be similar to one of the North Korean drones which had crashed in March 2014.

According to a 2014 BBC World Service poll, 3% of South Koreans viewed North Korea's influence positively, with 91% expressing a negative view, making South Korea, after Japan, the country with the most negative feelings of North Korea in the world. However, a 2014 government-funded survey found 13% of South Koreans viewed North Korea as hostile, and 58% of South Koreans believed North Korea was a country they should cooperate with.

On 1 January 2015, Kim in his New Year's address to the country, stated that he was willing to resume higher-level talks with the South.

In the first week of August 2015, a mine went off at the DMZ, wounding two South Korean soldiers. The South Korean government accused the North of planting the mine, which the North denied. After that, South Korea restarted propaganda broadcasts to the North.

On 20 August 2015, North Korea fired a shell on the city of Yeoncheon. South Korea launched several artillery rounds in response. There were no casualties in the South, but some local residents evacuated. The shelling caused both countries to adopt pre-war statuses and a talk that was held by high level officials in the Panmunjeom to relieve tensions on 22 August 2015, and the talks carried over to the next day. Nonetheless, while talks were going on, North Korea deployed over 70 percent of their submarines, which increased the tension once more on 23 August 2015. Talks continued into the next day and finally concluded on 25 August when both parties reached an agreement and military tensions were eased.

Despite peace talks between South Korea and North Korea on 9 September 2016 regarding the North's missile test, North Korea continued to progress with its missile testing. North Korea carried out its fifth nuclear test as part of the state's 68th anniversary since its founding. In response South Korea revealed that it had a plan to assassinate Kim.

According to a 2017 Korea Institute for National Unification, 58% of South Korean citizens had responded that unification was necessary. Among the respondents to the 2017 survey, 14% said 'we really need unification' while 44% said 'we kind of need the unification'. Regarding the survey question of 'Do we still need unification even if ROK and DPRK could peacefully coexist?', 46% agreed and 32% disagreed.

== Thaw in 2017 and 2018 ==
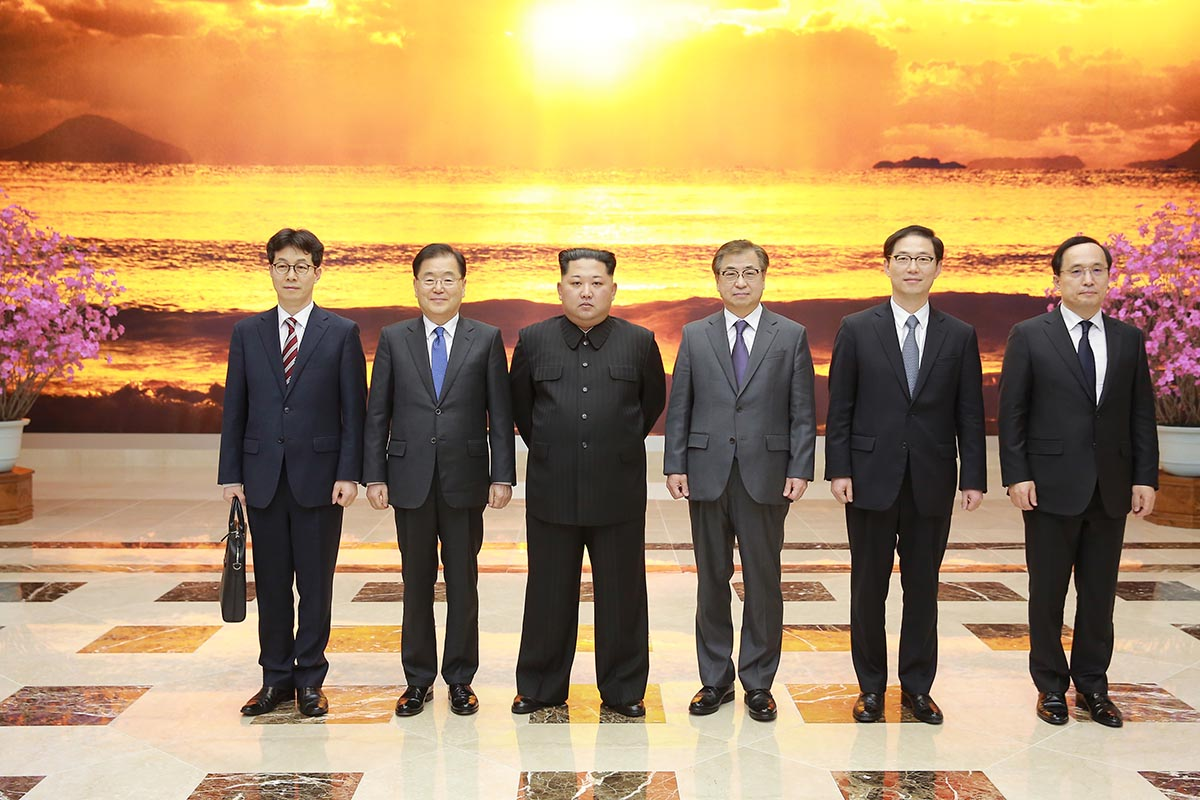
Kim Jong Un meeting with South Korean envoys at the Workers' Party of Korea main building, 6 March 2018

In May 2017 Moon Jae-in was elected President of South Korea with a promise to return to the Sunshine Policy. In his New Year address for 2018, North Korean leader Kim Jong Un proposed sending a delegation to the upcoming Winter Olympics in South Korea. The Seoul–Pyongyang hotline was reopened after almost two years. At the Winter Olympics, North and South Korea marched together in the opening ceremony and fielded a united women's ice hockey team. As well as the athletes, North Korea sent an unprecedented high-level delegation, headed by Kim Yo Jong, sister of Kim Jong Un, and President Kim Yong Nam, and including performers like the Samjiyon Orchestra. A North Korean art troupe also performed in two separate South Korean cities, including Seoul, in honor of the Olympic games as well. The North Korean ship which carried the art troupe, Man Gyong Bong 92, was also the first North Korean ship to arrive in South Korea since 2002. The delegation passed on an invitation to President Moon to visit North Korea.

Following the Olympics, authorities of the two countries raised the possibility that they could host the 2021 Asian Winter Games together. On 1 April, South Korean K-pop stars performed a concert in Pyongyang entitled "Spring is Coming", which was attended by Kim Jong Un and his wife. The K-pop stars were part of a 160-member South Korean art troupe which performed in North Korea in early April 2018. It also marked the first time since 2005 that any South Korean artist performed in North Korea. Meanwhile, propaganda broadcasts stopped on both sides.

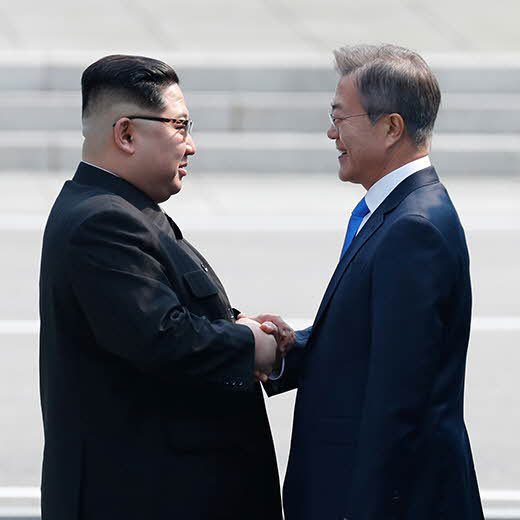
Kim and Moon shake hands in greeting at the demarcation line.

On 27 April, a summit took place between Moon and Kim in the South Korean zone of the Joint Security Area (JSA). It was the first time since the Korean War that a North Korean leader had entered South Korean territory. North Korean leader Kim Jong Un and South Korea's President Moon Jae-in met at the line that divides Korea. The summit ended with both countries pledging to work towards complete denuclearization of the Korean Peninsula. They also vowed to declare an official end to the Korean War within a year. As part of the Panmunjom Declaration which was signed by leaders of both countries, both sides also called for the end of longstanding military activities in the region of the Korean border and a reunification of Korea. Also, the leaders agreed to work together to connect and modernise their railways.

On 5 May, North Korea adjusted its time zone to match the South's. In May, South Korea began removing propaganda loudspeakers from the border area in line with the Panmunjom Declaration.

Moon and Kim met a second time on 26 May to discuss Kim's upcoming summit with Trump. The summit led to further meetings between North and South Korean officials during June. On 1 June, officials from both countries agreed to move forward with the military and Red Cross talks. They also agreed to reopen an Inter-Korean Liaison Office in Kaesong that the South had shut down in February 2016 after a North Korean nuclear test. The second meeting, involving the Red Cross and military, was held at North Korea's Mount Kumgang resort on 22 June where it was agreed that family reunions would resume. After the summit in April, a summit between US President Donald Trump and Kim Jong Un was held on 12 June 2018 in Singapore. South Korea hailed it as a success.

South Korea announced on 23 June 2018 that it would not conduct annual military exercises with the US in September, and would also stop its own drills in the Yellow Sea, in order to not provoke North Korea and to continue a peaceful dialog. On 1 July 2018, South and North Korea have resumed ship-to-ship radio communication, which could prevent accidental clashes between South and North Korean military vessels around the Northern Limit Line (NLL) in the West (Yellow) Sea. On 17 July 2018, South and North Korea fully restored their military communication line on the western part of the peninsula.

South Korea and North Korea competed as "Korea" in some events at the 2018 Asian Games. The co-operation extended to the film industry, with South Korea giving their approval to screen North Korean movies at the country's local festival while inviting several moviemakers from the latter. In August 2018, reunions of families divided since the Korean War took place at Mount Kumgang in North Korea. In September, at a summit with Moon in Pyongyang, Kim agreed to dismantle North Korea's nuclear weapons facilities if the United States took reciprocal action. In Pyongyang, an agreement titled the "Pyongyang Joint Declaration of September 2018" was signed by both Korean leaders. The agreement calls for the removal of landmines, guard posts, weapons, and personnel in the JSA from both sides of the North-South Korean border. They also agreed that they would establish buffer zones on their borders to prevent clashes. Moon became the first South Korean leader to give a speech to the North Korean public when he addressed 150,000 spectators at the Arirang Festival on 19 September. Also during the September 2018 summit, military leaders from both countries signed an Agreement on Reconciliation, Non-Aggression, Exchanges and Cooperation" (a.k.a. "the Basic Agreement") to help ensure less military tension between both countries and greater arms control.

On 23 October 2018, Moon ratified the Basic Agreement and Pyongyang Declaration just hours after they were approved by his cabinet.

On 30 November 2018, a South Korean train crossed the DMZ border with North Korea and stopped at Panmun Station. This was the first time a South Korean train had entered North Korean territory since 2008.

== Moon–Kim diplomacy 2019–2022 ==
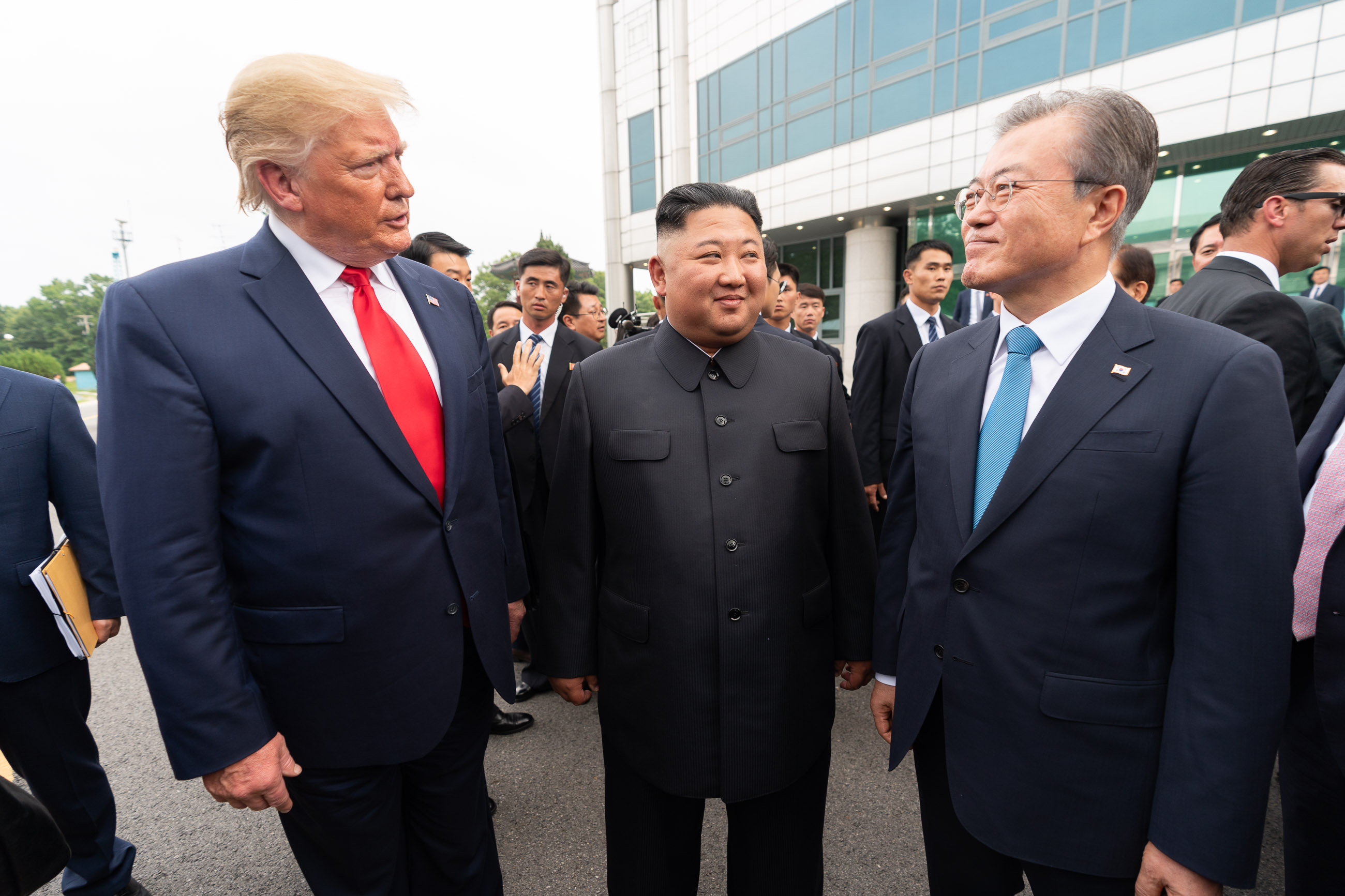
Trump, Kim and Moon at the demilitarized zone.

=== 2019 ===
On 30 June, Kim and Moon met again in the DMZ, joined by US President Donald Trump who initiated the meeting. The three held a meeting at the Inter-Korean House of Freedom. Meanwhile, North Korea conducted a series of short–range missile tests, and the US and South Korea took part in joint military drills in August. On 16 August 2019, North Korea's ruling party made a statement criticizing the South for participating in the drills and for buying US military hardware, calling it a "grave provocation" and saying there would be no more negotiation.

On 5 August, South Korea's president Moon Jae-in spoke during a meeting with his senior aides at the presidential Blue House in Seoul, discussing Japan's imposed trade restrictions to Korea as a result of historical issues. Moon then withdrew South Korea from an intelligence-sharing agreement with Japan, seeking a breakthrough with North Korea in the process, but opted against it at the last minute. In a meeting at Seoul's presidential Blue House in August 2019, amid an escalating trade row between South Korea and Japan, Moon expressed his willingness to cooperate economically with North Korea to overtake Japan's economy.

On 15 October, North and South Korea played a FIFA World Cup qualifier in Pyongyang, their first football match in the North in 30 years. The game was played behind closed doors with attendance open only to a total of 100 North Korean government personnel; no fans or South Korean media were allowed into the stadium, and the game was not broadcast live. No goals were scored. Meanwhile, Kim and Moon continued to have a close, respectful relationship.

The 2019 South Korea Defense White Paper does not label North Korea as an "enemy" or "threat" for the first time in history. While not explicitly calling North Korea an enemy, the paper mentions that North Korea's weapons of mass destruction threaten peace and stability on the Korean Peninsula.

=== 2020 ===
On 9 June 2020, North Korea began cutting off all of its communication lines with South Korea. This came after Pyongyang had repeatedly warned Seoul regarding matters such as the failure of the South to stop North Korean expatriate activists from sending anti-regime propaganda leaflets across the border. The Korean Central News Agency described it as "the first step of the determination to completely shut down all contact means with South Korea and get rid of unnecessary things". The sister of Kim Jong Un, Kim Yo Jong, as well as the Vice Chair of the Central Committee of the ruling Workers' Party of Korea, Kim Yong Chol, stated that North Korea had begun to treat South Korea as its enemy. A week prior to these actions, Kim Yo Jong had called North Korean defectors "human scum" and "mongrel dogs". The severing of communication lines substantially diminished the agreements that were made in 2018.

On 13 June, Kim Yo Jong warned that "before long, a tragic scene of the useless North-South joint liaison office completely collapsed would be seen." On 16 June, the North threatened to return troops that had been withdrawn from the border to posts where they had been previously stationed. Later that day, the joint liaison office in Kaesong was blown up by the North Korean government. Due to the COVID-19 pandemic, the South Korean delegation had departed from the building in January. On 5 June 2020, the North Korean foreign minister Ri Son Gwon said that prospects for peace between North and South Korea, and the U.S., had "faded away into a dark nightmare". On 21 June 2020, South Korea urged North Korea to not send propaganda leaflets across the border. The request followed the North's statement that it was ready to send 12 million leaflets, which could potentially become the largest psychological campaign against South Korea.

On 14 December 2020, the South Korean parliament passed a law which criminalized the launching of propaganda leaflets into North Korea. This ban applies to not only the large amount of balloon propaganda leaflets which have been sent into North Korea over the years, but also leaflets that have been sent in bottles in rivers which run along the Korean border. Violators of the law, which went into effect three months after it was approved, face up to three years in prison or 30 million won ($27,400) in fines.

=== 2021 ===
In February–March 2021, South Korea continued to omit North Korea's "enemy" status from the South Korean military's White Paper after downgrading the status of Japan.

In a statement made on 4 October 2021, South Korea's Unification Ministry announced that communication lines between North and South Korea have been restored. The reopening followed North Korean leader Kim Jong Un's vow to restart communication with South Korea. The two countries' militaries have also restored their hotlines along the east and west coasts, according to the South Korean Defense Ministry.

=== Artistic depictions ===
Crash Landing on You was a 2019–2020 South Korean television series directed by Lee Jeong-hyeo and featuring Hyun Bin, Son Ye-jin, Kim Jung-hyun, and Seo Ji-hye. It is about a South Korean woman who accidentally crash-lands in North Korea. It aired on tvN in South Korea and on Netflix worldwide from 14 December 2019 to 16 February 2020.

Ashfall was a 2019 South Korean action film directed by Lee Hae-jun and Kim Byung-seo, starring Lee Byung-hun, Ha Jung-woo, Ma Dong-seok, Bae Suzy and Jeon Hye-jin. The film was released in December 2019 in South Korea. In the film, the volcano of Baekdu Mountain suddenly erupts, causing severe earthquakes in both North and South Korea.

== Resumption of hostilities under Yoon Suk Yeol's government ==
=== 2021 ===
During his election campaign in 2021, Yoon Suk Yeol said that he would ask that the United States to redeploy tactical nuclear weapons in South Korea if there is a threat from North Korea. U.S. Deputy Assistant Secretary of State for Japan and Korea Mark Lambert rejected Yoon's call, saying the proposal was against U.S. policy.

=== 2022 ===
In November 2022, a US-South Korean air force exercise named Vigilant Storm was countered by North Korea by missile tests and an air force exercise.

=== 2023 ===
In November 2023, both the Koreas suspended the Comprehensive Agreement Pact - a pact aimed at lowering tensions between the two countries - which was signed at the September 2018 inter-Korean summit, after North Korea launched a spy satellite into space.

=== 2024 ===
On 15 January 2024, Kim Jong Un announced that peaceful reunification was no longer possible and proposed identifying South Korea as a hostile state in the North Korean constitution. It was also announced that North Korea would dissolve the Committee for the Peaceful Reunification of the Fatherland, the National Economic Cooperation Bureau and the Mount Kumgang International Tourism Administration. The Arch of Reunification in Pyongyang was subsequently demolished in January 2024.

On 4 June 2024, South Korea's State Council terminated the 2018 Panmunjom Declaration due to border tensions over balloons sent by North Korea. On 9 June 2024, South Korea announced to resume loudspeaker broadcasts of anti-North Korean propaganda after Pyongyang sent over 300 rubbish-filled balloons across the border. Seoul's military has detected around 330 balloons since 8 June 2024, with about 80 found in South Korean territory. The president's office stated that the broadcasts aimed to deliver messages of hope to the North Korean military and citizens. This response followed weeks of activists in the South launching balloons carrying K-pop, dollar bills, and anti-Kim Jong-un propaganda, which had infuriated Pyongyang. The loudspeaker broadcasts resumed after South Korea suspended a 2018 tension-easing agreement, allowing for propaganda campaigns and potential military exercises near the border.

South Korea announced it would deploy laser weapons in 2024 to shoot down North Korean drones, becoming the first country to do so. Developed with Hanwha Aerospace, these inexpensive and invisible lasers enhance defense capabilities by burning down drone engines within seconds. The move follows a December 2023 incident where North Korean drones entered South Korean airspace.

On 26 August 2024, North Korea revealed a new "suicide drone," with Kim Jong Un overseeing tests, according to state media. These drones, possibly acquired from Russia and strongly resembling the ZALA Lancet, are capable of striking targets on land and sea, raising security concerns for South Korea.

On 13 October 2024, North Korea threatened South Korea with 'severe consequences' if drones entered Pyongyang's airspace again, following accusations of recent drone activity. Although South Korea's defense minister refuted these claims, the Joint Chiefs of Staff stated they couldn't fully verify the incidents.

On 15 October 2024, North Korea destroyed the road connecting North and South Korea. South Korea predicts that North Korea intends to demonstrate a complete severance between the two Koreas. However, given that South Korea provided $125 million to North Korea for the construction of this road, South Korea is considering demanding repayment from North Korea.

On 24 October 2024, North Korean balloons carrying propaganda leaflets targeting South Korean President Yoon Suk Yeol and First Lady Kim Keon Hee were found in Seoul, amid rising tensions between the two Koreas.

On 11 December 2024, North Korea released its first statements on the martial law declaration through an article published in the state newspaper Rodong Sinmun, describing it as an "insane act" that was "akin to the coup d'état of the decades-ago military dictatorship era". It also described the incident "revealed the weakness in South Korean society" and hinted at the end of Yoon's political career. The newspaper also published images of anti-Yoon protests in Seoul.

=== 2025 ===
On 28 February 2025, North Korean leader Kim Jong Un oversaw a strategic cruise missile test and ordered full nuclear readiness, state media reported. The test aimed to demonstrate the country's nuclear capabilities in response to perceived threats. While cruise missiles are not banned under U.N. resolutions, North Korea continues to face sanctions for its ballistic missile and nuclear programs. This test occurred as Kim emphasized military loyalty and training, continuing his hostile rhetoric toward South Korea and the U.S. despite past diplomatic engagements.

North Korea continued to criticize the joint military drills between South Korea and the United States, particularly the "Freedom Shield" exercises that began on 10 March and ran until 20 March. North Korea condemned these drills, viewing them as provocative and worsening tensions on the Korean Peninsula. In response, North Korea launched multiple ballistic missiles on 10 March, with state media claiming that these exercises would deteriorate the situation.

North Korea also appeared close to completing its first airborne early warning aircraft, a significant military development that would enhance its surveillance capabilities.

== Lee Jae-myung's presidency (2025–present) ==
=== 2025 ===
On 11 June 2025, newly elected South Korean president Lee Jae-myung ordered the Republic of Korea Armed Forces (ROKA) to halt loudspeaker broadcasts and propaganda across the border with North Korea in an attempt to ease hostilities and tensions between the two nations.

North Korea rejected the overtures in July and stated that it had no interest in talks with South Korea. Despite this, during the 2025 China Victory Day Parade, South Korean National Assembly Speaker Woo Won-shik met with North Korean leader Kim Jong Un and the two shook hands and had a brief conversation. According to Woo's entourage, Woo said "We met again after 7 years" (referring to the 2018 inter-Korean summit) and Kim replied with the single word "yes". Woo also met with Vladimir Putin and Putin asked Woo if there is any message he can relay to Kim, with Woo responding by saying that it is important to build peace in the Korean Peninsula despite difficulties.

=== 2026 ===
On July 23, 2026, it was reported by NBC News that South Korea is abandoning its "denuclearization first" policy in favor of a "peace first" approach toward North Korea, Unification Minister Chung Dong-young said Thursday, while retaining the eventual goal of a nuclear-free Korean Peninsula. “The ultimate goal of denuclearization has not been abandoned, but denuclearization first has,” Chung was quoted as saying by his ministry at a news briefing. He said Seoul had replaced that approach with one prioritizing an initial halt to North Korea’s nuclear activities. He has also proposed referring to North Korea as “Choson,” an abbreviation of its formal name, rather than using the customary South Korean term. Pyongyang has said it has no interest in Seoul’s proposals or in resuming dialogue and accused President Lee Jae Myung of South Korea of continuing a confrontational policy by maintaining close ties with the United States.

== See also ==
- Cross-strait relations
- Korean conflict
- List of border incidents involving North and South Korea
- North Korea–South Korea football rivalry
- Opposition to Korean reunification
- Bilateral relations by country
  - Cambodia–Thailand relations
  - Hong Kong–mainland China relations
  - India–Pakistan relations
  - India–Sri Lanka relations
  - Inner German relations
  - Iran–Israel relations
  - Israeli–Lebanese conflict
  - Israeli–Palestinian conflict
  - Russia–Ukraine relations
  - Russia–United States relations
