= Inter-Korean Liaison Office =

2018–2020 North-South Korean building

- 남북공동연락사무소

Agency overview
- Formed: 14 September 2018
- Dissolved: 16 June 2020
- Jurisdiction: Korea: North Korea; South Korea
- Headquarters: Kaesong Industrial Region, North Korea; 37°55′58.7″N 126°37′18.7″E
- Agency executives: Jon Jong-su, North Korea Representative; Chun Hae-sung, South Korea Representative

- South Korean name
- Hangul: 남북공동연락사무소
- Hanja: 南北共同連絡事務所
- RR: Nambuk gongdong yeollak samuso
- MR: Nambuk kongdong yŏllak samuso

North Korean name
- Hangul: 북남공동련락사무소
- Hanja: 北南共同連絡事務所
- RR: Bungnam gongdong ryeollak samuso
- MR: Pungnam kongdong ryŏllak samuso

The Inter-Korean Liaison Office (Korean: 남북공동연락사무소) was a joint liaison office of North Korea and South Korea located in North Korea's Kaesong Industrial Region.

In the absence of formal diplomatic relations, the building functioned as a de facto embassy and provided a direct communication channel for the two nations. It was headed by North Korean Representative Jon Jong-su (전종수), vice chairman of the Committee for the Peaceful Reunification of the Fatherland and South Korean Representative Chun Hae-sung (천해성), vice minister of the Ministry of Unification.

The four-story office building was demolished by North Korea on 16 June 2020. It had been vacant since January due to the COVID-19 pandemic in Korea. The South Korean courts ordered North Korea to pay ₩44.6B to South Korea over the destruction of the building in September 2026.

== History ==
The joint liaison office was established as part of Panmunjom Declaration signed by North Korean leader Kim Jong-un and South Korean President Moon Jae-in on 27 April 2018, during the 2018 inter-Korean Summit in Panmunjom. The office was located in a four-story and a basement building with an area of 4,498.57 m^{2} (48,422.2 ft^{2}) constructed in 2005 for the Inter-Korean Exchange and Cooperation Consultation Office. The construction cost at the time was 8.0 billion KRW ($7.1 million) paid by the South Korean government. On 11 October 2018, it was reported that a water treatment plant which will be used by the Inter-Korean Liaison Office had been restored. By 25 October 2018, renovation and repairs to the building which houses the Inter-Korean Liaison Office were complete. The South Korean government spent 9.7 billion KRW ($8.6 million) on these renovations.

The first meeting at the Liaison Office occurred between delegates from both Koreas on 22 October 2018 and concerned, among other things, forestry cooperation between both Koreas. A meeting took place at the office between South Korean Vice Minister of Culture, Sports and Tourism Roh Tae-kang and North Korean Vice-Minister of Physical Culture and Sports Won Kil-u on 2 November 2018, talks at the office resulted in bids for a unified Korean team at the 2020 Olympics and to hold the 2032 Summer Olympics in both Koreas. Another meeting was held on 2 November 2018 between South Korean Vice Unification Minister Chun Hae-sung (천해성) and his North Korean counterpart, Jon Jong-su (전종수). Both men were co-heads of the office and each serve as liaison chief for their perspective country. Both Chun and Jon discussed cooperation in various joint-Korean projects.

Due to measures taken to contain the COVID-19 pandemic in Korea, the office was closed on 30 January 2020.

== Destruction of building ==
On 16 June 2020 at 2:50 pm, the four-story building was demolished by North Korea. North Korea's news agency, the Korean Central News Agency released a statement saying that "the liaison office was tragically ruined with a terrific explosion" and that it reflected "the mind-set of the enraged people" of their country. On 13 June, three days before the building was destroyed, Kim Yo-jong, the sister of Kim Jong-un, had predicted the collapse of the building as a retaliation for a failure by South Korea to crack down on North Korean defectors living in South Korea who used balloons to send anti-North Korean regime leaflets across the border.

The destruction coincided with the 20th anniversary of the first inter-Korean summit between Kim Dae-jung and Kim Jong-il. Surveillance cameras in South Korea showed that when the building was destroyed, a neighboring high-rise building that previously housed South Korean officials partially collapsed due to the strength of the blast.

South Korean president Moon Jae-in responded by heightening the South Korean military's alert level and saying there would be a stern response if North Korea continued to raise tensions. A statement released by the Blue House, South Korea's executive office, said that the building's destruction "is an act that goes against the expectations of those who wish for the development of South-North relations and the settlement of peace on the Korean Peninsula," and that "the government makes it clear that the responsibility for everything that follows this is entirely on the North's side."

== See also ==
- North Korea–South Korea relations
- Korean reunification
