= COVID-19 pandemic in Korea =

COVID-19 pandemic in Korea may refer to:

- COVID-19 pandemic in North Korea
- COVID-19 pandemic in South Korea
