= Panmunjom Declaration =

2018 peace and denuclearisation agreement between North and South Korea

Panmunjom Declaration for Peace, Prosperity and Reunification of the Korean Peninsula
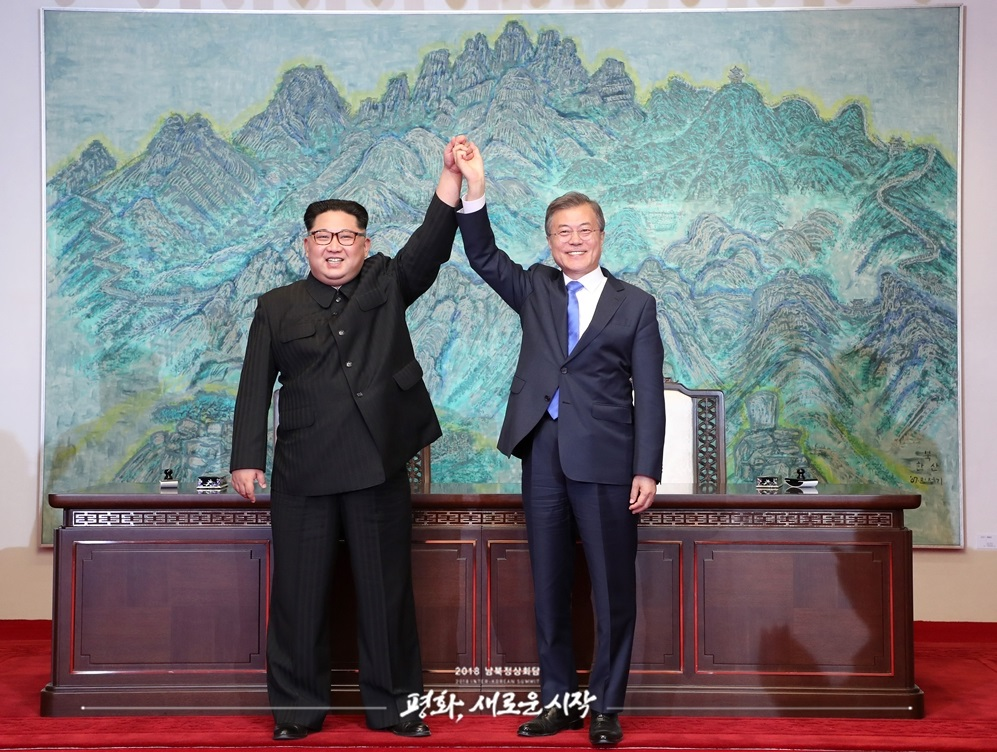
- Moon Jae-in and Kim Jong-un raise their hands together after signing the Panmunjom Declaration
- Type: Declaration
- Signed: 27 April 2018
- Location: Panmunjom, Korea
- Signatories: Moon Jae-in; (North Korea) Kim Jong-un
- Parties: Republic of Korea Armed Forces; (North Korea) Korean People's Army
- Language: Korean

- South Korean name
- Hangul: 한반도의 평화와 번영, 통일을 위한 판문점 선언
- Hanja: 韓半島의 平和와 繁榮, 統一을 爲한 板門店 宣言
- RR: Hanbandoui pyeonghwawa beonyeong, tongireul wihan Panmunjeom seoneon
- MR: Hanbandoŭi p'yŏnghwawa pŏnyŏng, t'ongirŭl wihan P'anmunjŏm sŏnŏn

North Korean name
- Hangul: 조선반도의 평화와 번영, 통일을 위한 판문점 선언
- Hanja: 朝鮮半島의 平和와 繁榮, 統一을 爲한 板門店 宣言
- RR: Joseonbandoui pyeonghwawa beonyeong, tongireul wihan Panmunjeom seoneon
- MR: Chosŏnbandoŭi p'yŏnghwawa pŏnyŏng, t'ongirŭl wihan P'anmunjŏm sŏnŏn

The Panmunjom Declaration for Peace, Prosperity and Reunification of the Korean Peninsula was adopted between the supreme leader of North Korea, Kim Jong Un, and the president of South Korea, Moon Jae-in, on 27 April 2018, during the 2018 inter-Korean Summit on the South Korean side of the Peace House in the Joint Security Area.

According to the declaration, the governments of South Korea (ROK) and North Korea (DPRK) agreed to cooperate on officially ending the Korean War and the Korean conflict, beginning a new era of peace and sharing commitments in ending divisions and confrontation by approaching a new era of national reconciliation, peace, reunification and prosperity and improvements to inter-Korean communication and relations.

This declaration states that both sides would "make active efforts to seek the support and cooperation of the international community for the denuclearization of the Korean Peninsula". The declaration was submitted to the United Nations General Assembly on 6 September 2018.

After the election in 2022 that brought the conservative president Yoon Suk Yeol to power, the 2018 agreement with the ROK was suspended by the DPRK on November 23, 2023, citing escalating military provocations and plans to deploy military forces along the military demarcation line. South Korea in turn suspended the declaration on June 4, 2024.

== Summary ==
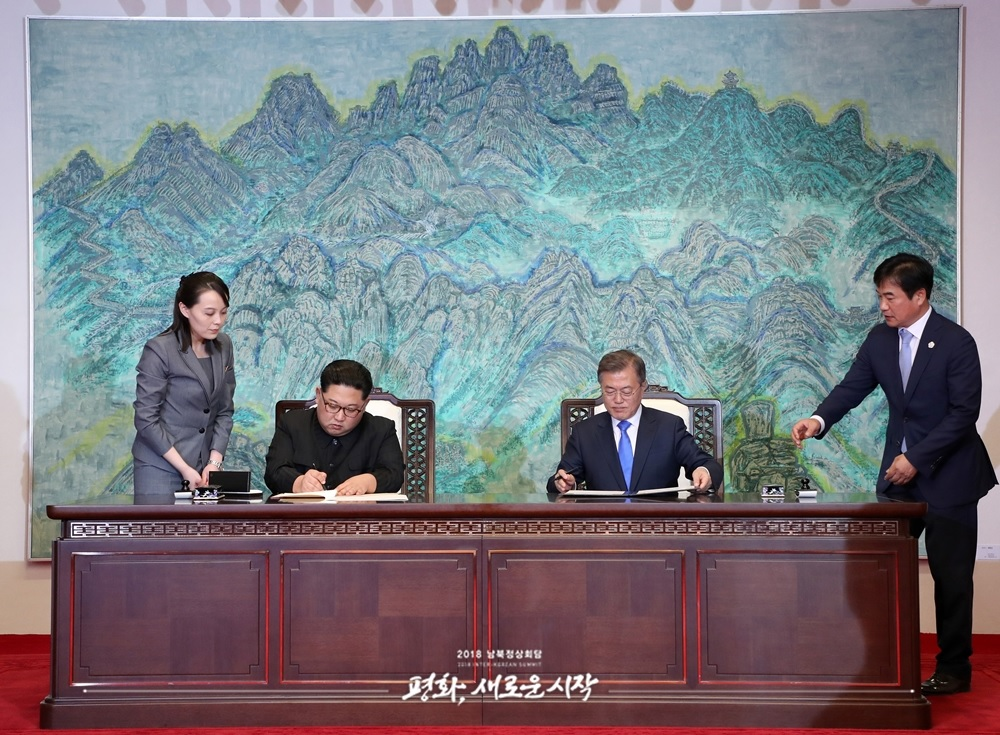
Moon Jae-in and Kim Jong Un sign the Panmunjom Declaration

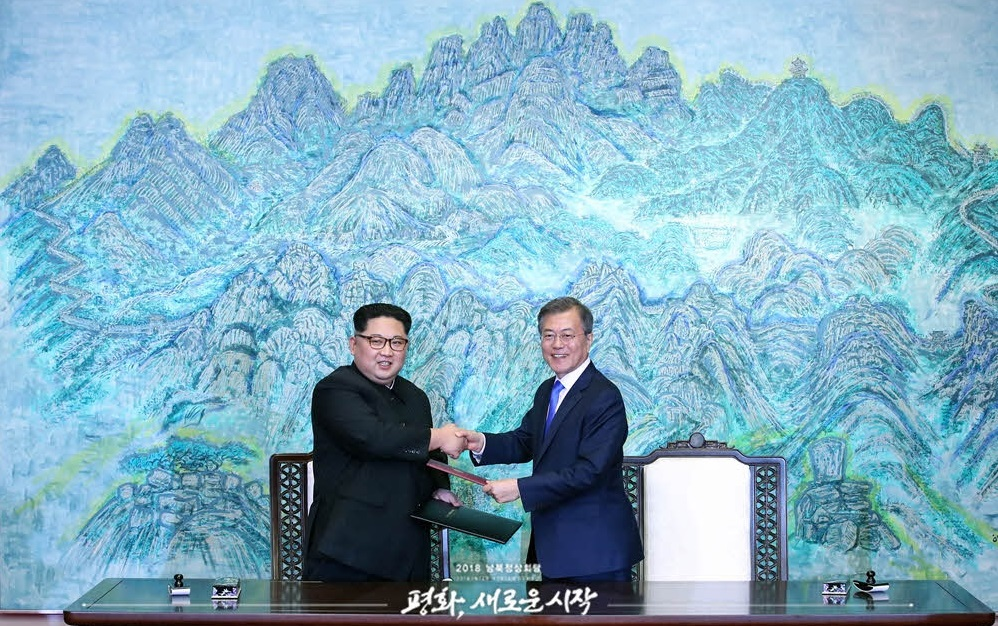
Moon Jae-in and Kim Jong Un hold the Panmunjom Declaration

- A full translation of the text of the Panmunjom Declaration can be found in Wikisource. Below is a summary of the declaration.

During this momentous period of historical transformation on the Korean Peninsula, reflecting the enduring aspiration of the Korean people for peace, prosperity, and reunification, President Moon Jae-in of the Republic of Korea and Chairman Kim Jong-un of the State Affairs Commission of the Democratic People's Republic of Korea held an Inter-Korean Summit Meeting at the 'Peace House' at Panmunjom on April 27, 2018.

The two leaders solemnly declared before the 80 million Korean people and the whole world that there will be no more war in Korea and thus a new era of peace has begun.

1. Promote common prosperity and reunification of Korea through dramatic improvement and development of inter-Korean relations

- Continue high-level working-level talks for the full implementation of the agreement
- Establishment of Joint Liaison Office in Gaeseong between South and North Korea
- Multilateral cooperation and exchange
- Inter-Korean Red Cross talks and reunions of separated families on 15 August 2018
- Connecting and modernizing roads with Donghae and Gyeongui railways

2. Elimination of military tension and substantial elimination of war risk

- Cease all hostile acts
- Designed as a peace zone in the western part of the west coast
- Establishment of military mutual guarantee measures through high-rank military-level talks

3. Establishing a permanent and peaceful Korean peninsula peace regime

- Inviolable agreement
- Stepwise disarmament
- In celebration of the 65th anniversary of the Korean Armistice Agreement in 2018, South and North Korea cooperate closely with the US and China to establish a peace treaty on the Korean Peninsula after ending the 1953 Korean War.
- Finalise the complete denuclearization of the Korean peninsula

The two leaders agreed, through regular meetings and direct telephone conversations, to hold frequent and candid discussions on issues vital to the nation, to strengthen mutual trust and to jointly endeavor to strengthen the positive momentum towards continuous advancement of inter-Korean relations as well as peace, prosperity and reunification of the Korean Peninsula.

In this context, President Moon Jae-in agreed to visit Pyongyang in the fall of 2018.

April 27, 2018
Done in Panmunjom
(signed) Moon Jae-in, President, The Republic of Korea
(signed) Kim Jong-un, Chairman, State Affairs Commission, The Democratic People's Republic of Korea

== See also ==
- Korean Armistice Agreement
- 2018 North Korea–United States Singapore Summit
- 2019 North Korea–United States Hanoi Summit
