= Two hostile states theory =

North Korean policy towards South Korea

- Hangul: 적대적 두 국가론
- Hanja: 敵對的 두 國家論
- RR: jeokdaejeok du gukgaron
- MR: chŏktaejŏk tu kukkaron

Following the announcement of the two hostile states theory, the DPRK stopped claiming the territory controlled by South Korea as part of its territory.

The two hostile states theory (Korean: 적대적 두 국가론) is the official policy of North Korea and the Workers' Party of Korea (WPK) in regard to its relations with South Korea since 2023. The policy, taken by North Korean leader Kim Jong Un, reflects the abandonment of the country's previous policy of promoting Korean reunification on the basis of being constituents of the same Korean nation, instead declaring that the Republic of Korea (ROK) is an "enemy" state of the Democratic People's Republic of Korea (DPRK) with which there can be no discussions.

Since the announcement of the policy, North Korea has renamed and removed symbols related to reunification throughout the country, shut down organizations and websites related to reunification, and amended the state constitution and the WPK Rules to eliminate references to reunification. Additionally, meaning of national symbols such the anthem and the flag were changed to remove a pan-Korean identity.

== Background ==
Korea was formerly ruled by the Korean Empire as the last unified polity of the region before it was annexed by Japan in 1910. After World War II, the country was partioned into North Korea and South Korea by the Soviet Union and the United States. In 1972, North Korean leader Kim Il Sung proposed the Three Principles of National Reunification, which became North Korea's standard policy regarding the issue of reunification. In the same year, South Korean President Park Chung Hee introduced the Yushin Constitution, which constitutionalized South Korea's claim over the entire Korean Peninsula and mandated the country would seek unification. Since then, the relationship between the two Koreas has waxed and waned, improving when liberal presidents take power in South Korea and deteriorating when conservative presidents are elected.

== History ==
=== Central Committee speech ===
In December 2023, during a speech at the ninth plenum of the 8th Central Committee of the Workers' Party of Korea, North Korean leader Kim Jong Un called for a "fundamental turnabout" in North Korea's stance towards South Korea, calling the South the "enemy". He stated "the party's comprehensive conclusion after reviewing inter-Korean relations is that reunification can never be achieved with those ROK riffraffs that defined the 'unification by absorption' and 'unification under liberal democracy' as their state policy", which he said is in "sharp contradiction with what our line of national reunification was: one nation, one state with two systems". He stated:

For a long period spanning not just ten years but more than half a century…the idea, line and policies for national reunification laid down by our Party and the DPRK government…has [not] brought about a proper fruition and the North-South relations have repeated the vicious cycle of contact and suspension, dialogue and confrontation.

Kim cited South Korean constitution's claims over the entire Korean Peninsula and President Yoon Suk Yeol's policy towards the north as evidence that South Korea is an unsuitable partner for reunification. He continued by saying:

If there is a common point among the “policies toward the North” and “unification policies” pursued by the successive South Korean rulers, it is the “collapse of the DPRK’s regime” and “unification by absorption”. And it is clearly proved by the fact that the keynote of “unification under liberal democracy” has been invariably carried forward although the puppet regime has changed more than ten times so far.

He said the relations between the two Koreas currently were "states hostile to each other and the relations between two belligerent states" and no longer ones that are "consanguineous or homogeneous". He said:

I think it is a mistake we should no longer make to regard the clan, who publicly defined us as the “principal enemy” and is seeking only the opportunity of “collapse of power” and “unification by absorption” in collusion with foreign forces, as the partner of reconciliation and reunification…South Korea at present is nothing but a hemiplegic malformation and colonial subordinate state whose politics is completely out of order, whole society tainted by Yankee culture, and defence and security totally dependent on the U.S.

Kim also instructed the WPK on reforming organizations related to inter-Korean relations, including the WPK's United Front Department.

=== Supreme People's Assembly speech ===
Kim Jong Un further confirmed a shift in policy in January 2024, when he gave a speech to the Supreme People's Assembly (SPA) calling for the constitution to be amended to remove references to cooperation and reunification, as well as specify DPRK's territorial borders and add an article specifying the ROK as the most hostile country. He also rejected the maritime Northern Limit Line, saying that "If the Republic of Korea invades our ground territory, territorial air space, or territorial waters by even 0.001 mm, it will be considered a provocation of war". He called for the removal of physical symbols such as the Arch of Reunification, which he called an "eyesore". The SPA also voted on the abolition of three inter-Korean cooperation organizations; the Committee for the Peaceful Reunification of the Fatherland, the Korean People's Cooperation Administration, and the Kumgangsan International Tourism Administration. Kim said that "independence, peace, and solidarity on the basis of minjok [must] henceforth be erased from the [North Korean] constitution", adding that "the very concepts of unification, reconciliation, and a shared [Korean] minjok must be eliminated".

=== Implementation ===
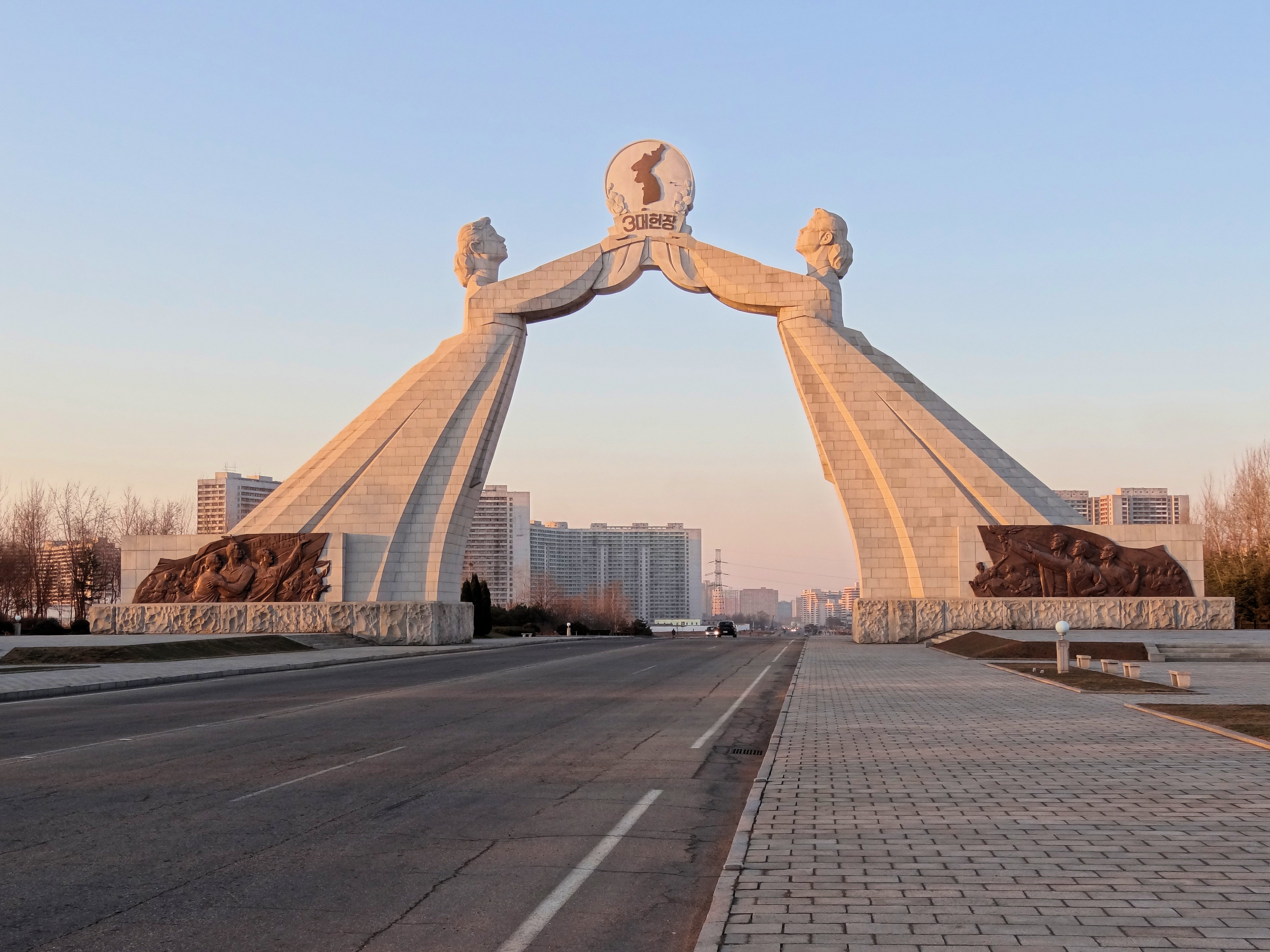
Arch of Reunification, demolished in early 2024 in North Korea in accordance with the policy

Following the announcement of the policy, North Korean state media started referring to South Korea as Hanguk (한국) and Daehanminguk (대한민국) instead of the previously used Namjosŏn (남조선); the former are the names used by South Korea to refer to itself, while the latter emphasized the view that both Koreas were part of the same nation and that South Korea was the southern constituent of the DPRK. In January 2024, North Korean state television started broadcasting maps that only highlight the northern half of the Korean Peninsula, leaving out South Korean territory. In the same month, North Korean websites Ryomyong and Uriminzokkiri took down sections referencing reunification. Shortly after, North Korean websites targeting South Koreans, including Uriminzokkiri, DPRK Today, Arirang Meari, Tongil Voice and Ryomyong went offline, as well as social media accounts related to them.

The Arch of Reunification was demolished some time between 19 and 23 January 2024, according to satellite imagery. In February 2024, in line with the policy, the lyrics of Aegukka were partially modified, with the phrase "three thousand ri" (삼천리; 三千里) referring to the Korean Peninsula being replaced by "this world" (이 세상; 이 世上). In May 2024, South Korean Unification Minister Kim Yung-ho said that the UFD has been demoted and changed into the "Workers' Party of Korea Central Committee 10 Bureau" and said that they believe the reorganized entity is tasked with psychological warfare. Seoul-based Daily NK also reported major shifts, saying that most of the duties and staff of the UFD was transferred to the Ministry of Foreign Affairs and the Reconnaissance General Bureau (RGB). It said that the Ministry of Foreign Affairs would now be responsible for handling relations with the South, while the RGB will take over UFD's propaganda and clandestine operations in the South.

In August 2024, the Tongil station (Unification station) was renamed to the Moranbong station. In the same month, Daily NK reported that North Korean authorities ordered "reunification" to be removed from students’ textbooks. In October 2024, the North Korea conducted detonations cutting off the Gyeongui and Donghae roads north of the military demarcation line. In the same month, the North Korean Constitution was amended by the 11th Session of the 14th Supreme People's Assembly. The official report published by the Korean Central News Agency mentioned changes to voting and working ages. Later on 17 October, the state media mentioned a constitutional provision that identifies the Republic of Korea as a "hostile state". Daily NK reported that since 2024, the country was moving towards "de-ethnification", de-emphasizing ethnic ties with South Korea. It reported that the Institute of Enemy State Studies determined the "disinterest in reunification is rapidly spreading among South Korean youth and the very concept of ethnic unity is collapsing" and started emphasizing "cultural and genetic differences" between North Koreans and South Koreans, while Kim Jong Un said South Korean youth was "foreign youth who are no longer the same people as us and who can never be on our side". Daily NK also reported some researchers developed an approach of describing young South Koreans as "biologically foreigners who mimic the Korean language but have completely different identities".

In January 2025, Daily NK reported that North Korean government permits to visit the regions along the Korean Demilitarized Zone were renamed from "front line approval number" to "national border approval number", similar to the certificate used in the China–North Korea border. Yonhap News Agency reported in May 2025 that North Korea had issued instructions for state media to not use "puppet Korea" (괴뢰 한국; koeroe han'guk), which itself was a change from the historically used "puppet South Korea" (남조선 괴뢰; namjosŏn koeroe), used to imply South Korea is a puppet of the United States. Yonhap suggested the term "puppet" itself "naturally brings to mind a relationship between a nation or a clan," and that, "the cessation of the use of the term 'puppet Korea' appears to be an attempt to block the perception among residents that the South and the North are one nation". Daily NK reported in July 2025 that the National Reunification Institute under the Committee for the Peaceful Reunification of the Fatherland was renamed to the Institute of Enemy State Studies and placed under 10 Bureau. In September 2025, Daily NK reported that North Korea had issued an order to replace maps of the Korean Peninsula displayed in state agency offices nationwide with maps showing only North Korea, with South Korea being labelled as Hanguk as a foreign country.

The white circle and stripes in the flag, originaly symbolizing the purity and homogeneity of the Korean people, was changed to represent "the loyalty of the Korean people who support the leadership of the Party and the leader with a pure mind".

At the 9th Congress of the Workers' Party of Korea in January 2026, Kim said that North Korea would continue the policy where "all ties with South Korea have been completely eliminated", continuing by saying "The DPRK has absolutely no business dealings with the Republic of Korea, its most hostile entity, and will forever exclude South Korea from the category of fellow countrymen". He rejected the possibility of Korean reunification, accusing South Korea of trying to reunite the Peninsula under the "capitalist reactionary system of liberal democracy". The Rules of the Workers' Party of Korea were amended at the Congress, removing references to the "peaceful unification of the fatherland" and "great national unity", as well as the goals of "removing the aggressive forces of U.S. imperialism from South Korea" and "liquidating U.S. political and military domination" were removed, though expressions such as "hostile state" and "belligerent relationship" were not added.

Kim repeated his opposition to reunification at the first session of the 15th Supreme People's Assembly in March, stating "South Korea will be recognized as the most hostile state and will be thoroughly rejected, ignored and dealt with in the most explicit words and actions" and continuing by saying "For any act of South Korea touching our Republic, without the slightest consideration or the smallest hesitation, we will make it pay the price mercilessly". At the session, a new constitution was adopted, which declared that "The territory of the Democratic People's Republic of Korea includes the territory bordering the People's Republic of China and the Russian Federation to the north, and the Republic of Korea to the south, as well as the territorial seas and airspace established thereon", while adding DPRK "shall under no circumstances permit any infringement upon its territory". Additionally, the goals "to realize national reunification on the principles of independence, peaceful reunification, and great national unity" was removed. The white circle and stripes in the flag of North Korea originally symbolized the purity and homogeneity of the Korean people. In 2026, the adoption of the two hostile states theory, Naenara's description was amended to say the white circle and stripes represent "the loyalty of the Korean people who support the leadership of the Party and the leader with a pure mind".

== See also ==
- Committee for the Peaceful Reunification of the Fatherland
- Juche
- Ten Principles for the Establishment of a Monolithic Ideological System
