= Korea Asia-Pacific Peace Committee =

North Korean state agency

- 조선아시아태평양평화위원회

Agency overview
- Formed: May 1994
- Headquarters: Pyongyang, North Korea
- Parent agency: United Front Department

Korean name
- Hangul: 조선아시아태평양평화위원회
- Hanja: 朝鮮亞太平和委員會
- RR: Joseon Asia Taepyeongyang pyeonghwa wiwonhoe
- MR: Chosŏn Asia T'aep'yŏngyang p'yŏnghwa wiwŏnhoe

The Korea Asia-Pacific Peace Committee (KAPPC; Korean: 조선아시아태평양평화위원회) is a North Korean agency tasked with external affairs. It is under the leadership of the United Front Department of the Workers' Party of Korea (WPK).

== History ==
The KAPPC was established in May 1994 to expand and strengthen civilian-level political, economic, and cultural exchanges between North Korea and countries in the Asia-Pacific that it had not established diplomatic relations with, particularly Japan and the United States. It was revealed to the outside world when North Korean state media reported KAPPC Chair Kim Yong-sun met with Nakamaru Kaoru, Director of the Institute of International Affairs in Japan. In the late 1990s, it also assumed responsibilities over developing economic relations with South Korea, including the Mount Kumgang Tourist Region and the Kaesong Industrial Complex. In 2018, Kim Yong-chol visited the United States as the chairman of the Korea Asia-Pacific Peace Committee.
