= Korean reunification =

Potential unification of Korea

- Korean Unification Flag

Korean name
- Hangul: 남북통일
- Hanja: 南北統一
- RR: Nambuk tongil
- MR: Nambuk t'ongil

Korean reunification is the hypothetical unification of North Korea and South Korea into a singular Korean sovereign state. Prior to World War I and Korea under Japanese rule (1910–1945), all of Korea had been unified as a single state for over a millennium, notably under the Goryeo and Joseon dynasties (the latter of which was declared the Korean Empire in 1897). After the end of World War II in 1945, Korea was divided along the 38th parallel (now the Korean Demilitarized Zone). North Korea was occupied by the Soviet Union, and later administered by the Workers' Party of Korea under Kim Il Sung. South Korea was occupied by the United States, later becoming independent under Syngman Rhee. Both governments of the two new Korean states claimed to be the sole legitimate government of all of Korea. The Korean War, which began in June 1950, ended in a stalemate in July 1953.

After the end of the Korean War, cooperation proved a challenge as the two countries increasingly diverged at a steady pace. The relations between North and South Korea warmed during the 2000s, when South Korea pursued the Sunshine Policy of greater engagement with the North, and again in late 2010s. The two countries declared moving towards reunification of the peninsula while still maintaining two opposing regimes at the June 15th North–South Joint Declaration in June 2000, was reaffirmed by 4 October Declaration in October 2007 and the Panmunjom Declaration in April 2018. In the Panmunjom Declaration, the two countries agreed to work to officially end the Korean conflict in the future. Subsequently, the relations have since deteriorated.

Amid rising tensions in 2024, North Korean leader Kim Jong Un officially "ruled out unification" with South Korea and instead described the relationship as one between "two hostile states", demolishing the Arch of Reunification in Pyongyang and removing references to reunification in media and art, most notably changing the lyrics of the National Anthem. Although South Korea continues its official territorial claims over North Korea and actively operates relevant government agencies such as the Ministry of Unification, public support for reunification has been rapidly declining in recent decades, especially among the younger generation. Polls in 2025 showed that, for the first time in history, a majority of South Koreans did not favour reunification with the North. In 2026, North Korea withdrew its claim to sovereignty over South Korea by defining its territory as "bordering the Republic of Korea" in a new constitutional amendment.

== Background ==
The current division of the Korean Peninsula is the result of decisions taken at the end of World War II. In 1910, the Empire of Japan annexed Korea and ruled over it until its defeat in World War II. The Korean independence agreement officially occurred on 1 December 1943, when the United States, China, and the United Kingdom signed the Cairo Declaration, which stated: "The aforesaid three powers, mindful of the enslavement of the people of Korea, are determined that in due course Korea shall become free and independent". In 1945, the United Nations developed plans for trusteeship administration of Korea.

The division of the peninsula into two military occupation zones was agreed: the Soviet Civil Administration in the North and the United States Army Military Government in Korea in the South. At midnight on 10 August 1945, two army lieutenant colonels selected the 38th parallel as a dividing line. Japanese troops north of the line were to surrender to the Soviet Union, and the troops south of the line would surrender to the United States.

The partition was not originally intended to last long, but Cold War politics resulted in the establishment of two separate governments in the two zones in 1948, and rising tensions prevented co-operation. The desire of many Koreans for a peaceful unification was dashed when the Korean War broke out in 1950. On 25 June 1950, troops from North Korea invaded South Korea. Mao Zedong encouraged the confrontation with the United States and Joseph Stalin reluctantly supported the invasion. After three years of fighting, which involved both Koreas, China and United Nations forces led by the US, the war ended with an armistice agreement at approximately the same boundary.

== History ==
=== Bilateral agreements ===
==== North-South Joint Communiqué, 1972 ====
After the détente between the United States and China, the North and South Korean governments made in 1972 the July 4 South–North Joint Statement to improve the relations between the two countries on 4 July 1972. It had a representative of each government secretly visit the other's capital city, and both sides agreed to a North-South Joint Communiqué, outlining the steps to be taken towards achieving a peaceful reunification of the country:

1. Unification shall be achieved through independent Korean efforts without being subject to the external imposition of interference.
2. Unification shall be achieved through peaceful means, and not through the use of force against each other.
3. As a homogeneous people, a great national unity shall be sought above all, transcending differences in ideas, ideologies, and systems.
4. In order to ease tensions, and foster an atmosphere of mutual trust between the South and the North, the two sides have agreed not to slander or defame each other, not to undertake armed provocations whether on a large or small scale and to take positive measures to prevent inadvertent military incidents.
5. The two sides, in order to restore severed national ties, promote mutual understanding, and expedite independent peaceful unification, have agreed to carry out various exchanges in many fields such as culture and science.
6. The two sides have agreed to cooperate positively with each other to seek early success of the north–south Red Cross talks, which are underway with the fervent expectations of the entire people.
7. The two sides, in order to prevent the outbreak of unexpected military incidents and to deal directly, promptly, and accurately with problems arising between the North and the South, have agreed to install a direct telephone line between Seoul and Pyongyang.
8. The two sides, in order to implement the aforementioned agreed-upon items, to solve various problems existing between the North and the South, and to settle the unification problem on the basis of the agreed-upon principles for the unification of the Fatherland, have agreed to establish and operate a North-South Coordinating Committee co-chaired by Director Yi Hurak [representing the South] and Director Kim Yong-ju [representing the North].
9. The two sides, firmly convinced that the aforementioned agreed-upon items correspond with the common aspirations of the entire people, who are anxious to see an early unification of the Fatherland, hereby solemnly pledge before the entire Korean people that they will faithfully carry out these agreed-upon items."

The agreement outlined the steps to be taken towards achieving a peaceful reunification of the country. However, the North-South Coordination Committee was disbanded the following year after no progress had been made towards implementing the agreement. In January 1989, the founder of Hyundai, Jung Ju-young, toured North Korea and promoted tourism in Mount Kumgang. After a twelve-year hiatus, the prime ministers of the two Koreas met in Seoul in September 1990 to engage in the Inter-Korean summits or High-Level Talks. In December, the two countries reached an agreement on issues of reconciliation, nonaggression, cooperation, and exchange between North and South in "The Agreement on Reconciliation, Nonaggression, Cooperation, and Exchange Between North and South", but these talks collapsed over inspection of nuclear facilities. In 1994, after former U.S. President Jimmy Carter's visit to Pyongyang, the leaders of the two Koreas agreed to meet with each other, but the meeting was prevented by the death of Kim Il Sung that July.

==== 15 June North–South Joint Declaration, 2000 ====
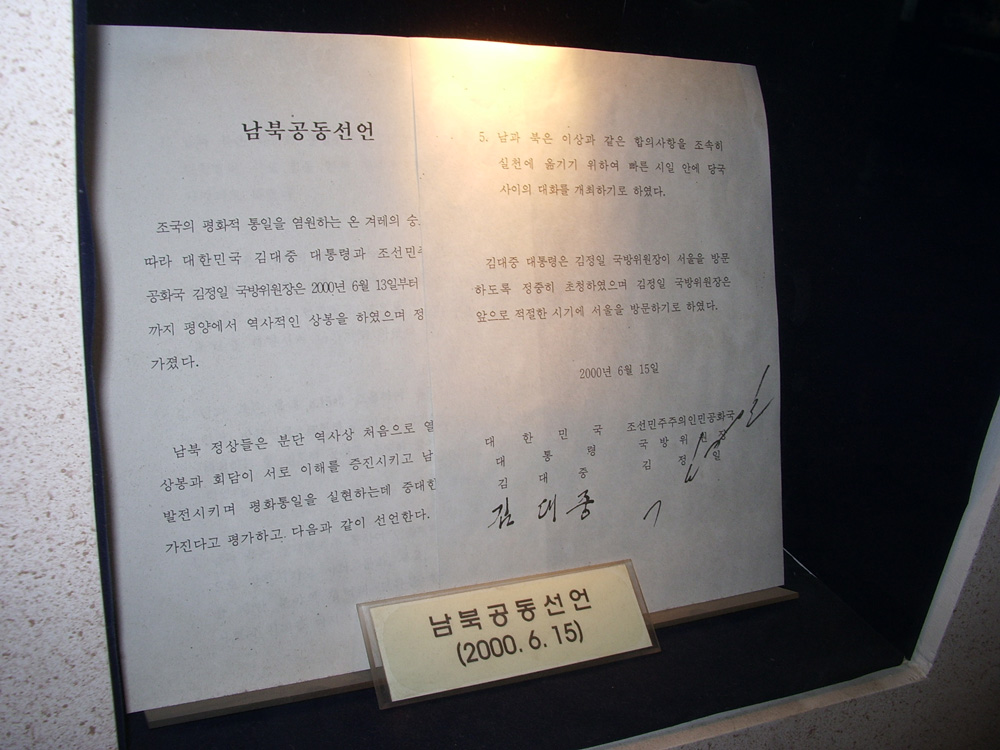
15 June Joint Declaration signed by Kim Jong Il and Kim Dae-jung

In June 2000, North and South Korea signed the June 15th North–South Joint Declaration, in which both sides made promises to seek out a peaceful reunification with the co-existence of two systems:

1. The North and the South agreed to solve the question of the country's reunification independently by the concerted efforts of the Korean nation responsible for it.
2. The North and the South, recognizing that the low-level federation proposed by the North and the commonwealth system proposed by the South for the reunification of the country have similarity, agreed to work together for the reunification in this direction in the future.
3. The North and the South agreed to settle humanitarian issues (such as the North Korean famine) as early as possible, including the exchange of visiting groups of separated families and relatives and the issue of unconverted long-term prisoners, to mark 15 August this year.
4. The North and the South agreed to promote the balanced development of the national economy through economic cooperation and build mutual confidence by activating cooperation and exchange in all fields, social, cultural, sports, public health, environmental and so on.
5. The North and the South agreed to hold an authority-to-authority negotiation as soon as possible to put the above-mentioned agreed points into speedy operation.

==== 4 October Declaration, 2007 ====
During the 2007 high-level inter-Korean talks held in Pyongyang between Kim Jong Il and Roh Moo Hyun, both sides agreed to the 4 October Declaration, improving on inter-Korean relations on the basis of the 15 June Joint Declaration. The eight points of the declaration signed on 4 October 2007 are as follows:

1. "The north and the south shall uphold and positively implement the 15 June Joint Declaration.
2. "The north and the south agreed to convert north-south relations definitely into those of mutual respect and confidence, transcending the difference in ideology and system.
3. "The north and the south agreed to closely cooperate with each other in the efforts to put an end to hostile military relations and ensure détente and peace on the Korean peninsula.
4. "The north and the south, based on the common understanding of the need to put an end to the existing armistice mechanism and build a lasting peace mechanism, agreed to cooperate with each other in the efforts to push forward with the issue of arranging a meeting on the territory of the Korean peninsula of the heads of state of three or four parties directly concerned to promote the matter of declaring an end to war.
5. "The north and the south agreed to reactivate economic cooperation and bring about its sustained development on the principles of ensuring common interests and prosperity and meeting each other's needs with a view to balanced development of the national economy and common prosperity.
6. "The north and the south agreed to develop exchanges and cooperation in social and cultural fields such as history, language, education, science and technology, culture and the arts, and sports to add brilliance to the time-honored history and fine culture of the nation.
7. "The north and the south agreed to push forward humanitarian cooperation.
8. "The north and the south agreed to strengthen cooperation on the international arena in the efforts to protect the interests of the nation and the rights and interests of overseas Koreans."

==== Panmunjom Declaration, 2018 ====
In April 2018, at the north–south summit talks at the "House of Peace" in Panmunjom, Kim Jong Un and Moon Jae-in signed the Panmunjom Declaration, declaring that there would be no longer war and a new era of peace has opened on the Korean peninsula. They declared as follows reflecting the firm will to put an end to division and confrontation, to open up a new era of national reconciliation, peace and prosperity and more actively improve and develop the north–south ties. A brief outline of the three main points of the agreement are as follows:

1. "The north and the south will achieve comprehensive and epochal improvement and development in the north-south ties and thus relink the severed blood vessel of the nation and bring earlier the future of common prosperity and independent reunification.
2. "The north and the south will make joint efforts to defuse the acute military tensions and to substantially defuse the danger of a war on the Korean peninsula.
3. "The north and the south will closely cooperate with each other to build a durable and lasting peace mechanism on the Korean peninsula."

=== Internationally ===
A unified Korean team marched in the opening ceremonies of the 2000, 2004, and 2006 Olympics, but the North and South Korean national teams competed separately. There were plans for a truly unified team at the 2008 Summer Olympics, but the two countries were unable to agree on the details of its implementation. In the 1991 World Table Tennis Championships in Chiba, Japan, the two countries formed a unified team. A Unified Korea women's ice hockey team competed under a separate IOC country code designation (COR) in the 2018 Winter Olympics; in all other sports, there were a separate North Korea team and a separate South Korea team.

== Current status ==
The nature of unification, i.e. through North Korean collapse, South Korean collapse, or the formation of two systems under a united federation, is still a topic of intense political debate and even conflict among interested parties, which include both Koreas, China, Japan, Russia, and the United States.

Relations between the two Koreas have been strained, with conflict between the two coming to a head such as in the enforcement of the colonial era National Security Law in South Korea which led to the arrest of South Korean pro-reunification activist Roh Su-hui, suspected torpedoing of the ROKS Cheonan and the bombardment of Yeonpyeong Island, both in 2010, the rocket launches in April and December of 2012 and North Korea's third nuclear test in 2013. Kim Jong Un's sudden accession and limited experience governing have also stoked fears about power struggles among different factions leading to future instability on the Korean Peninsula.

Reunification has remained a long-term goal for the governments of both North and South Korea. North Korean leader Kim Jong Un made calls in his 2012 New Year's Day speech to "remove confrontation" between the two countries and implement previous joint agreements for increased economic and political cooperation. The South Korean Ministry of Unification redoubled their efforts in 2011 and 2012 to raise awareness of the issue, launching a variety show (Miracle Audition) and an Internet sitcom with pro-unification themes. The Ministry already promotes curriculum in elementary schooling, such as a government-issued textbook about North Korea titled "We Are One" and reunification-themed arts and crafts projects.

=== 2018–19 Korean peace process ===
In Kim's 2018 New Year's address, a Korean-led reunification was repeatedly mentioned and an unexpected proposal was made for the North's participation in the 2018 Winter Olympics that were held in Pyeongchang County of South Korea, a significant shift after several years of increasing hostilities, the 2018–19 Korean peace process. Subsequent meetings between North and South led to the announcement that the two Koreas would march together with a unified flag in the Olympics' Opening Ceremony and form a unified ice hockey team, with a total of 22 North Korean athletes participating in various other competitions including figure skating, short track speed skating, cross-country skiing and alpine skiing.

In April 2018, at a summit in Panmunjom, Kim Jong Un and South Korean President Moon Jae-in signed a deal committing to finally seal peace between both Koreas by the end of the year. Both leaders also symbolically crossed each other's borders, marking the first time a South Korean president crossed the North border and vice versa. Kim stated that the North will start a process of denuclearization, which was supported by the U.S. President Donald Trump. In 2019, Moon Jae-in proposed reunification of the Korean peninsula by 2045. The peace talks led to nothing, as North Korea continued forward with their nuclear program, despite former U.S. President Donald Trump showcasing it as a considerable win.

=== Deteriorating relations (2020–present) ===
On 4 June 2020, the North Korean official media released a statement by Kim Yo-jong, warning that the inter-Korean Liaison Office could be "abolished" in retaliation for the South Korean government's failure to prevent North Korean defectors from sending propaganda balloons into North Korea. On 16 June 2020 at 2:50 pm, the four-story building of the inter-Korean liaison office was demolished with TNT explosives by North Korea. Since then, the deteriorating relation between the two countries became evident.

In December 2023, during a speech at the 9th plenum of the 8th Central Committee of the Workers' Party of Korea, Kim called for a "fundamental turnabout" in North Korea's stance towards South Korea, calling the South the "enemy". He stated "the party's comprehensive conclusion after reviewing inter-Korean relations is that reunification can never be achieved with those ROK riffraffs that defined the 'unification by absorption' and 'unification under liberal democracy' as their state policy", which he said is in "sharp contradiction with what our line of national reunification was: one nation, one state with two systems".

Kim cited South Korean constitution's claims over the entire Korean Peninsula and President Yoon's policy towards the north as evidence that South Korea is an unsuitable partner for reunification. He said the relations between the two Koreas currently were "states hostile to each other and the relations between two belligerent states" and no longer ones that are "consanguineous or homogeneous", continuing by saying it is "unsuitable" to discuss the issue of reunification "with this strange clan [South Korea], who is no more than a colonial stooge of the U.S. despite the rhetorical word [we used to use] — 'the fellow countrymen.'" Kim also instructed the WPK on reforming organizations related to inter-Korean relations, including the WPK's United Front Department.

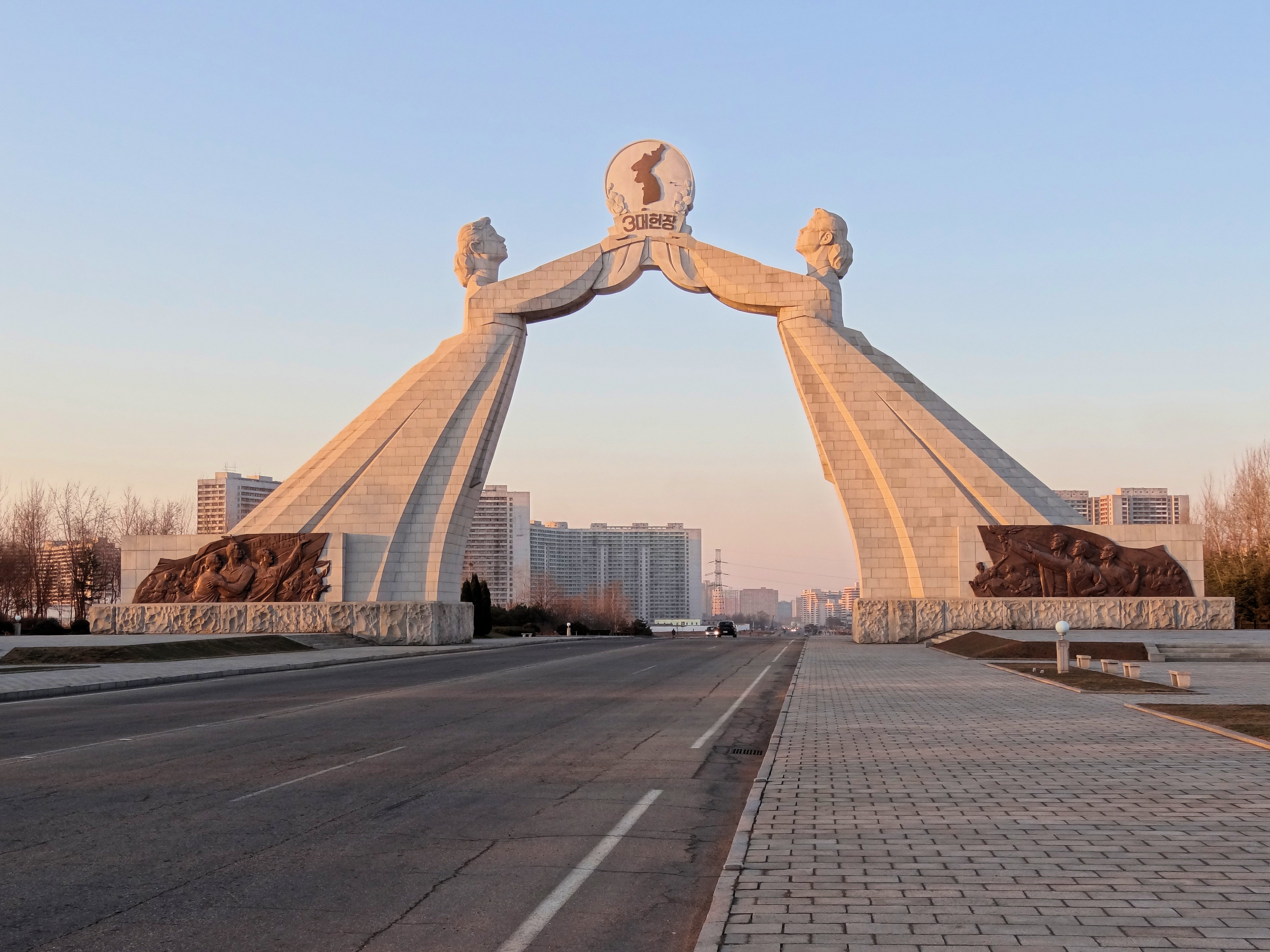
Arch of Reunification, demolished in early 2024 in North Korea

Kim further confirmed a shift in policy in January 2024, when he gave a speech to the Supreme People's Assembly (SPA) calling for the constitution to be amended to remove references to cooperation and reunification, as well as specify DPRK's territorial borders and add an article specifying the ROK as the most hostile country. He also rejected the maritime Northern Limit Line, saying that "If the Republic of Korea invades our ground territory, territorial air space, or territorial waters by even 0.001 mm, it will be considered a provocation of war". He called for the removal of physical symbols such as the Arch of Reunification, which he called an "eyesore". The SPA also voted on the abolition of three inter-Korean cooperation organizations; the Committee for the Peaceful Reunification of the Fatherland, the Korean People's Cooperation Administration, and the Kumgangsan International Tourism Administration.

Under President Yoon Suk Yeol, South Korea adopted a harder policy towards North Korea, with the South Korean government reclarifying their goals of "unification by absorption" under a liberal democracy system. On 1 March 2024, the government of South Korea intended to update its vision of unification for the first time in 30 years. This was the first revision of the Unification Formula of the national community, South Korea's unification policy unveiled in August 1994 under the administration of late President Kim Young-sam. On 15 August 2024, Yoon outlined his policy on reunification, calling for a "unified Republic of Korea"; this was the first time this term was used by a South Korean administration. It was seen as South Korea's most explicit policy statement to date in support of unification by absorption, referring to unifying the Korean Peninsula under the Republic of Korea. He called on efforts to increase support among North Koreans for a "freedom-based unification", which he said would be done by expanding efforts to increase North Korean people's access to information.

==== Lee Jae Myung's presidency ====
Following the inauguration of President Lee Jae Myung in June 2025, South Korea's approach toward North Korea shifted to a more pragmatic and engagement-oriented stance, contrasting with the hardline policies of his predecessor. On 11 June 2025, Lee banned anti-North Korean activists from sending leaflets into the North by balloon. He also ordered the military to halt loudspeaker propaganda broadcasts across the border with North Korea, South Korea even switched off shortwave radio broadcasts that had carried similar propaganda for over half a century in an attempt to improve relations. North Korea responded by halting their own propaganda loudspeakers towards the South just a few hours later. Lee expressed gratitude for the North's reciprocation, remarking that the speed of their response had exceeded his expectations, and also expressed hope for an improvement in relations.

These efforts by Lee were “not the work worthy of appreciation,” said Kim Yo Jong, who spoke for her brother, Kim Jong Un, in a statement. She went on to say that no matter what policy was adopted in Seoul or proposal was sent that they had zero interest in discussion with South Korea. These had been the first official remarks on the new administration by the North. South Korea sought to downplay the significance of the statement by Kim Yo Jong, saying that the government would continue its efforts to promote reconciliation and cooperation. A South Korean government spokesman, Koo Byoung-sam, said that the remarks from the North “showed how high the wall of distrust has become in South-North Korean relations.”

During the 2025 China Victory Day Parade, South Korean National Assembly Speaker Woo Won-shik met with North Korean leader Kim Jong Un and the two shook hands and had a brief conversation. According to Woo's entourage, Woo said "We met again after 7 years" (referring to the 2018 inter-Korean summit) and Kim replied with the single word "yes". Woo also met with Vladimir Putin and Putin asked Woo if there is any message he can relay to Kim, with Woo responding by saying that it is important to build peace in the Korean Peninsula despite difficulties.

In March 2026, North Korea removed a clause from its constitution that called for Korean reunification. Subsequently, all clauses referring to South Korea or national unification were removed from the Rules of the Workers' Party of Korea revised in 2026.

== Public opinion ==
Support for reunification in South Korea has been falling, especially among the younger generations. In the 1990s, the percent of people in government polls who regarded reunification as essential was over 80%. By 2011 that number had dropped to 56%. According to a December 2017 survey released by the Korea Institute for National Unification (KINU), 72.1% of South Koreans in their 20s believe reunification is unnecessary, with younger South Koreans saying they are more concerned about issues related to their economy, employment, and living costs. In 2025, a poll by the KINU showed that 51% thought reunification was unnecessary, while 49% thought it was necessary; it marked the first time a majority of South Koreans thought of reunification as unnecessary. A further 63.2% agreed that "unification is not necessary if peaceful coexistence can be maintained", 47% said it was "acceptable" for the two Koreas to be permanently divided, and 68.1% said they were "indifferent" to North Korea.

According to a 2026 poll by Seoul National University’s Institute for Peace and Unification Studies, 39% of South Koreans believed unification with North Korea was impossible, compared to 60% who believed it was possible. Additionally, 29% believed reunification was unnecessary and 31% preferred the two Koreas to remain divided; the figures were 55.9% and 55.1% respectively for those in their 20s and 30s. 86% said they felt threatened by North Korea's nuclear weapons, 78.3% believed dialogue and compromising with North Korea was impossible, and 83.3% believed North Korea did not want reunification.

Polls show a majority of South Koreans, even those in age groups traditionally seen as being more eager to reunify the peninsula, are not willing to see their living conditions decline in order to accommodate a reunification with the North. Moreover, about 50% of men in their 20s see North Korea as an outright enemy that they want nothing to do with.

In 2017, Paul Roderick Gregory has suggested that a complete abandonment of Korean reunification may be necessary, in exchange for the North to dismantle its nuclear weapons program and permanently ending the Korean War with a peace treaty.

== Strategies ==
=== Sunshine Policy ===
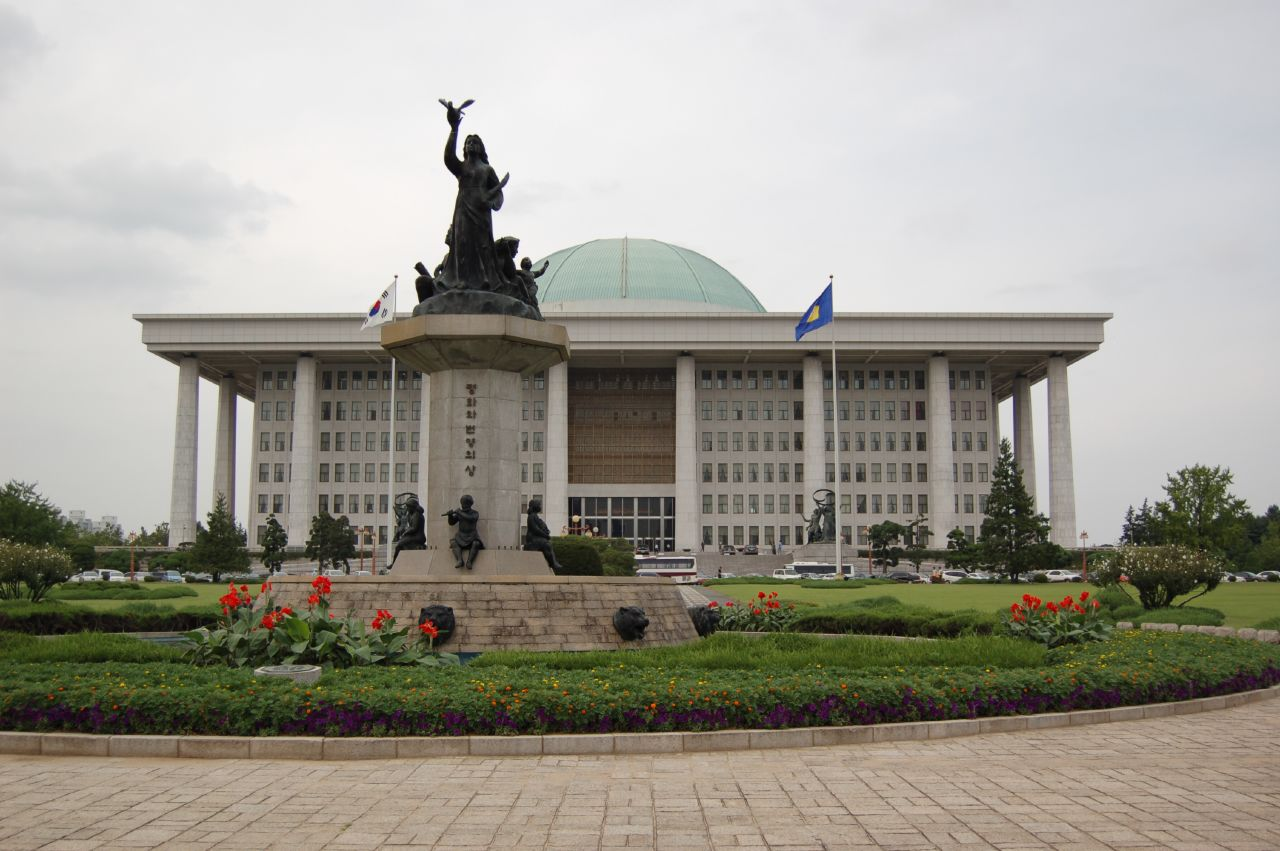
South Korea's National Assembly. The woman holding a dove symbolizes peace and prosperity.

Introduced by the Millennium Democratic Party of South Korea under President Kim Dae-jung, as part of a campaign pledge to "actively pursue reconciliation and cooperation" with North Korea, the Sunshine Policy was intended to create conditions of economic assistance and cooperation for reunification, rather than sanctions and military threats. The plan was divided into three parts: increased cooperation through inter-Korean organizations (while maintaining separate systems in the North and South), national unification with two autonomous regional governments, and finally the creation of a central national government. In 1998, Kim approved large shipments of food aid to the North Korean government, lifted limits on business deals between North Korean and South Korean firms, and even called for a stop to the American economic embargo against the North. In June 2000, the leaders of North and South Korea met in Pyongyang and shook hands for the first time since the division of Korea.

Despite the continuation of the Sunshine Policy under the Roh administration, it was eventually declared a failure by the South Korean Ministry of Unification in November 2010 over issues of North Korea's nuclear weapons program, stymied further negotiations, and again strained relations between the two Koreas.

==== Opponents ====
Opponents of the Sunshine Policy argue that dialogue and trade with North Korea did nothing to improve prospects for peaceful reunification, despite the transfer of large funds to the North Korean government by President Kim Dae-jung, but allowed the North Korean government to retain its hold on power. Others believe that South Korea should remain prepared for the event of a North Korean attack. Hardliners also argue that the continued and maximized isolation of the North will lead to the country's collapse after which the territory could be absorbed into South Korea.

In November 2000, outgoing US President Bill Clinton wanted to visit Pyongyang. However, the intended visit never happened because of the controversy surrounding the results of the 2000 US presidential election. Around April or May 2001, Kim Dae-jung was expecting to welcome Kim Jong Il to Seoul. Returning from his meeting in Washington D.C., with newly elected President Bush, Kim Dae-jung described his meeting as embarrassing while privately cursing President Bush and his hardliner approach. This meeting negated any chance of a North Korean visit to South Korea. After the Bush administration labeled North Korea as part of the "axis of evil", North Korea renounced the nonproliferation treaty, expelled UN inspectors, and restarted its nuclear program. In early 2005, the North Korean government confirmed that the country had successfully become a nuclear armed state, with its first nuclear test conducted in October 2006.

=== The Three Charters for National Reunification, 1997 ===
In North Korea, the Three Charters for National Reunification have served as the sole guidelines for reunification. They contain the Three Principles for National Reunification, Ten Point Programme for Reunification of the Country and the plan of founding the Democratic Confederal Republic of Koryo. They were formulated by North Korean leader Kim Jong Il into the Three Charters for National Reunification in his public work "Let Us Carry Out the Great Comrade's Instructions for National Reunification", in 1997.

==== Three Principles for National Reunification ====
North Korean President Kim Il Sung proposed the Three Principles of National Reunification in 1972 as the central force that should drive reunification. They are as follows:

1. "National reunification should be achieved independently without reliance on outside forces and free from their interference.
2. "Great national unity should be promoted by transcending the differences in ideas, ideals and systems.
3. "National reunification should be achieved by peaceful means without resorting to arms."

==== Ten Point Programme for Reunification of the Country ====
The Ten Point Programme for Reunification of the Country was written by Kim Il Sung in 1993 and contains the idea of reunification with South Korea under a pan-national unified state. It emphasises once again the need for an independent reunification, and more specifically, the removal of US forces from the peninsula. It is laid out as follows:

1. "A unified state, independent, peaceful and neutral, should be founded through the great unity of the whole nation.
2. "Unity should be based on patriotism and the spirit of national independence.
3. "Unity should be achieved on the principle of promotion coexistence, coprosperity and common interests and subordinating everything to the cause of national reunification.
4. "All manner of political disputes that foment division and confrontation between the fellow countrymen should be stopped and unity be achieved.
5. "They should dispel fears of invasion from the south and from the north, prevail-over-communism and communization altogether and believe in and unite with each other.
6. "They should set store by democracy and join hands on the road to national reunification, not rejecting each other for the difference in isms and principles.
7. "They should protect material and spiritual wealth of individual persons and organizations and encourage them to be used favorably for the promotion of great national unity.
8. "The whole nation should understand, trust and unite with one another through contacts, travels and dialogues.
9. "The whole nation in the north and the south and overseas should strengthen solidarity with one another on the way to national reunification.
10. "Those who have contributed to the great unity of the nation and to the cause of national reunification should be highly estimated."

==== Democratic Confederal Republic of Koryo ====
In accordance with the three principles and the ten point programme, Kim Il Sung elaborated on the proposed state, called Democratic Confederal Republic of Koryo (DFRK), on 10 October 1980, in the Report to the Sixth Congress of the Workers' Party of Korea on the Work of the Central Committee. Kim proposed a confederation between North and South Korea, in which their respective political systems would initially remain. It is described by North Korea as a "...peaceful reunification proposal to found a federal state on the condition that the north and the south recognize and tolerate each other's existing ideologies." It was stated that the DFRK should be a neutral country which does not participate in any political, military alliance or bloc, embracing the whole of the territory and people of the country. It would be ruled by the Supreme Assembly of the Nation, composed of an equal number of deputies from the North and the South. This was met with skepticism in South Korean sources: since the North Korean delegation was assumed to vote on proposals unanimously much like the Supreme People's Assembly does today, the support of just one South Korean member would be enough to pass the Workers' Party of Korea's preferred decisions, while South Korean parties would be unable to pass measures against the WPK's wishes (excluding the slim possibility of all South Korean parties unanimously agreeing on a proposal as well as persuading the WPK's satellite parties, the Korean Social Democratic Party and the Chondoist Chongu Party, to their side, in a similar manner to the Contract Sejm in Poland.)

=== Reunification tax, 2011 ===
On 1 January 2011, a group of twelve lawmakers from the ruling and opposition parties introduced a bill into the South Korean National Assembly to allow for the establishment of a "unification tax". The bill called for businesses to pay 0.05% of corporate tax, individuals to pay 5% of inheritance or gift taxes, and both individuals and companies to pay 2% of their income tax towards the cost of unification. The bill initiated legislative debate on practical measures to prepare for unification, as proposed by President Lee Myung-bak in his Liberation Day speech the previous year. The proposal for a unification tax was not warmly welcomed at the time. Lee has since reiterated concerns regarding the imminence of unification, which, combined with North Korean behavior, led to the tax proposal gaining wider acceptance. Practical measures to prepare for unification are becoming an increasingly frequent aspect of political debate, as concern regarding imminent and abrupt unification increases.

=== Korean Economic Community ===
It has been suggested that the formation of a Korean economic community could be a way to ease in unification of the peninsula. Lee Myung-bak, departing from the Saenuri Party's traditional hardline stance, outlined a comprehensive diplomatic package on North Korea that includes setting up a consultative body to discuss economic projects between the two Koreas. He proposed seeking a Korean economic community agreement to provide the legal and systemic basis for any projects agreed to in the body.

=== Reunification Investment Fund ===
In 2017, former Inha University professor Shepherd Iverson proposed creating a $175 billion reunification investment fund aiming to bribe the elite officials on top of DPRK's hierarchy to ensure a diplomatic way to resolve the Korean conflict by conducting an internal regime change. In the proposal a sum of up to $23.3 billion would be paid in total to the families of those elite officials who wield power in Pyongyang, while he noted that the top ten families would receive $30 million each, and the top thousand families would get $5 million. Another sum of $121.8 billion would go to the country's general population to start their life again post-reunification, and it's envisioned that the proceeds for the fund is to be raised from private groups and business moguls.

== International positions ==
=== China ===
In 1984, the Beijing Review provided China's view on Korean unification: "With regard to the situation on the Korean peninsula, China's position is clear: it is squarely behind the proposal of North Korea for tripartite (between the two Koreas and the United States) talks to seek a peaceful and independent reunification of Korea in the form of a confederation, free from outside interference. China believes this is the surest way to reduce tension on the peninsula."

China's current relationship with North Korea and position on a unified Korea is seen as dependent on a number of issues. A unified Korea could prevent North Korea's nuclear weapons program from destabilizing East Asia as well as the Chinese government. The 2010 United States diplomatic cables leak mentioned two unnamed PRC officials telling the Deputy Foreign Minister of South Korea that the younger generation of Chinese leaders increasingly believed that Korea should be reunified under South Korean rule, provided it were not hostile to China. The report also claimed that senior officials and the general public in the PRC were becoming increasingly frustrated with the North acting like a "spoiled child," following its repeated missile and nuclear tests, which were seen as a gesture of defiance not only to the West, but also to China. The business magazine Caixin reported that North Korea accounted for 40% of China's foreign aid budget and required 50,000 tonnes of oil per month as a buffer state against Japan, South Korea, and the United States, with whom trade and investment is now worth billions. North Korea is seen in China as expensive and internationally embarrassing to support.

However, the collapse of the North Korean regime and unification by Seoul would also present a number of problems for China. A sudden and violent collapse might cause a mass exodus of North Koreans fleeing or fighting poverty into China, causing a humanitarian crisis that could destabilize northeast China. The movement of South Korean and American soldiers into the North could result in their being temporarily or even permanently stationed on China's border, seen as a potential threat to China sovereignty and an imposition of a China containment policy. A unified Korea could also more strongly pursue its territorial disputes with China and might inflame nationalism among Koreans in China. Some have claimed the existence of contingency plans for the PRC intervening in situations of great turmoil in North Korea (with the Chinese Academy of Social Sciences' Northeast Project on the Chinese identity of the Goguryeo kingdom potentially used to justify intervention or even annexation).

=== Japan ===
Similarly, reunification of Korea poses complications for future Korea–Japan relations, especially with regards to the disputed territorial status of the Liancourt Rocks and historical issues such as the comfort women. A reunified Korea will likely position itself as an economic competitor to Japan.

=== Soviet Union and Russia ===
As relations between North Korea and the Soviet Union warmed, the latter returned to warm public support for Kim Il Sung's peaceful reunification proposals. Soviet attention in Northeast Asia gradually began to focus on a new plan for "collective security in Asia" first proposed in an Izvestia editorial in May 1969 and mentioned specifically by Soviet general secretary Leonid Brezhnev in his address to the International Conference of Communist and Workers' Parties in Moscow the following month:

For us, the burning problems of the present international situation do not push into the background more long-range tasks, especially the creation of a system of collective security in those parts of the world where the threat of the unleashing of a new World War and the unleashing of armed conflicts is centered... We think that the course of events also places on the agenda the task of creating a system of collective security in Asia.

In modern times, there are many signs of North Korea's and Russia's relations becoming more aligned, but these actions have been seen as the two nations developing sentiment against reunification. The first sign was in 2017, when North Korea officially recognized Moscow as the ruling force in Crimea. Later, in 2024, North Korea sent at least 13,000 troops to fight against Ukraine forces in Russia's war. Then Kim Jong Un revised the North Korean constitution to drop any reference to unification in 2026. These events have sparked concerns that Russia has changed it's position on reunification.

South Korea condemns Russia's actions over Ukraine in United Nation votes while keeping the reunification policy unchanged in policy.

=== United States ===
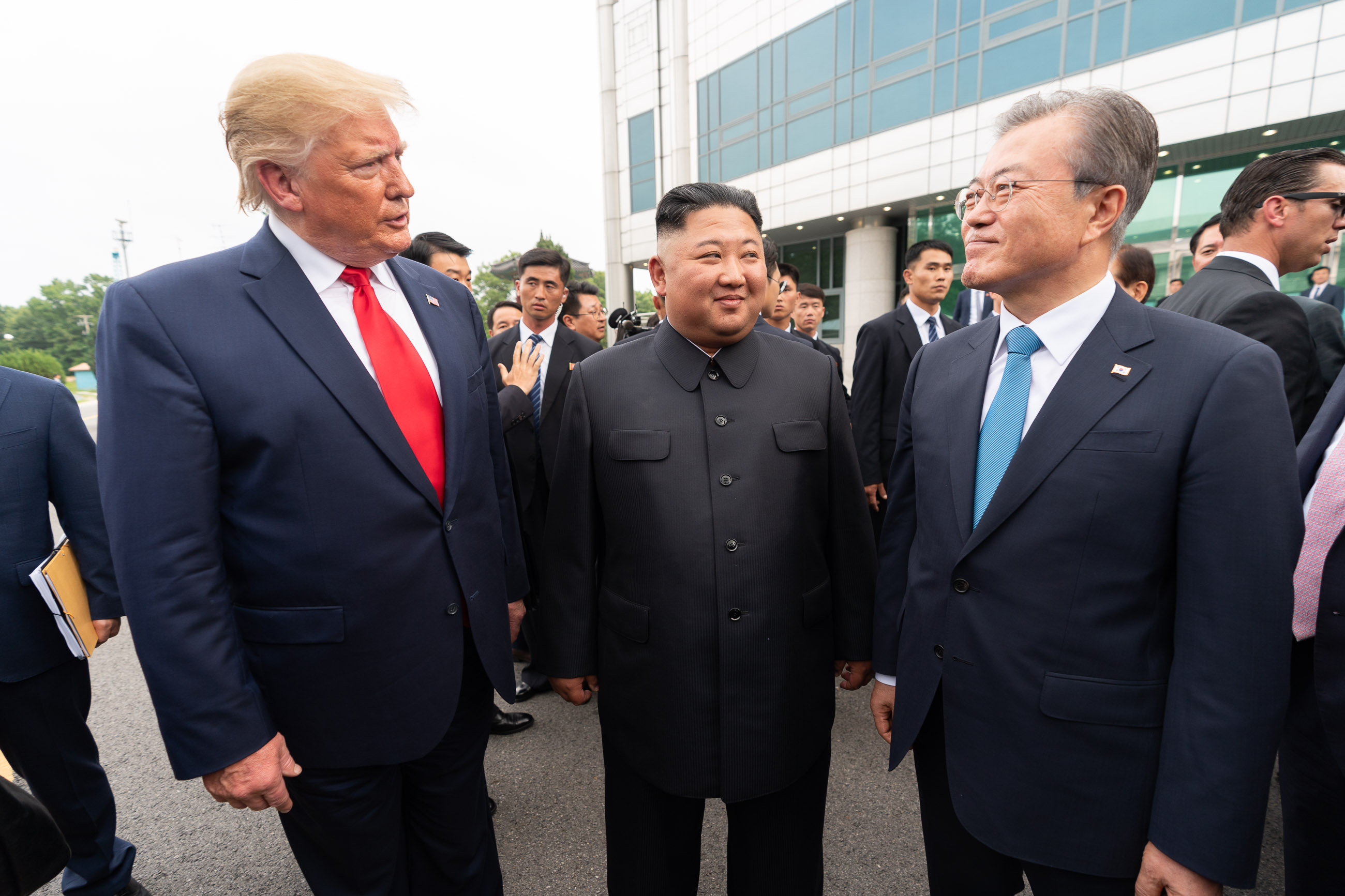
US President Donald Trump (left), North Korean Chairman Kim Jong Un (center), and South Korean President Moon Jae-in (right) in the demilitarized zone in 2019

The United States officially supports Korean reunification under a democratic government, but questions still remain as to the continued relevance of US military presence on the peninsula. Mike Mansfield proposed that Korea be neutralized under a great-power agreement, accompanied by the withdrawal of all foreign troops and the discontinuation of security treaties with the great power guarantors of the North and South.

In the 1990s, despite issues surrounding the controversial US-South Korean joint Team Spirit military exercises, the Clinton administration still managed to help turn around the situation regarding peace with North Korea through Jimmy Carter's support. It promised light water reactors in exchange for the availability of North Korea for inspection of its facilities and other concessions. North Korea reacted positively, despite blaming the United States as the original aggressor in the Korean War. There were attempts to normalize relations with Japan as well as the United States with South Korean President Kim Dae-jung in open support. North Korea actually favored the United States military's position on the front lines because it helped prevent an outbreak of war. Eventually, aid and oil were supplied, and even cooperation with South Korean business firms. However, one of the remaining fears was North Korea, with their necessary uranium deposits, having the potential to achieve a high level of nuclear technology.

Former US Secretary of State Henry Kissinger, another supporter of Korean unification, proposed a six-party conference to find a way out of the Korean dilemma, composed of the two Koreas and four connected powers (the United States, the Soviet Union, China, and Japan). North Korea denounced the "four plus two" scenario, as it was also known, by claiming Korea would be at the mercy of the great powers and insinuated the reestablishment of Japanese power in Korea. However, North Korea ultimately lacked confidence in getting simultaneous help from China and the Soviet Union.

=== United Nations ===
Following a summit meeting held between leaders of the two countries in Pyongyang from 13 to 15 June in 2000, the chairmen of the Millennium Summit issued a statement welcoming their Joint Declaration as a breakthrough in bringing peace, stability, and reunification to the Korean peninsula. Seven weeks later, a resolution to the same effect was passed by the United Nations General Assembly after being co-sponsored by 150 other nations.

A scheduled General Assembly debate on the topic in 2002 was deferred for a year at the request of both nations, and when the subject returned in 2003, it was immediately dropped off the agenda.

The issue did not return to the General Assembly until 2007, following a second Inter-Korean summit held in Pyongyang on 2–4 October 2007. These talks were held during one round of the Six-Party Talks in Beijing which committed to the denuclearization of the Korean peninsula.

== Implications ==
=== Assessment ===
A unified Korea could have great implications for the balance of power in the region, with South Korea already considered by many a regional power.

In September 2009, Goldman Sachs published its 188th Global Economics Paper about the subject of "reassessing North Korea Risks and A United Korea" which highlighted in detail the potential economic power of a unified Korea, which would surpass many G7 countries, including Canada, Germany, France, Italy, the United Kingdom, and possibly Japan within 30–40 years of reunification, with a potential GDP of more than $6 trillion by 2075. The young, skilled labor and large amount of natural resources from the North combined with the advanced technology, infrastructure, and large amount of capital in the South, as well as Korea's strategic location connecting three major economic powers, were cited as potential factors that could drive this growth. According to some opinions, a unified Korea could occur before 2075. If it occurred, Korean reunification would immediately raise the country's population to over 80 million. According to research by Jin-Wook Kim at Citi, reunification would require an investment of US$63.1 billion in the long term to rebuild transportation such as railroads, roads, airports, seaports, and other infrastructure like power plants, mines, oil refineries, and gas pipelines.

Korea in 2075
	United Korea	South Korea	North Korea
GDP in USD	$6.056 trillion	$4.073 trillion	$1.982 trillion
GDP per capita	$78,000	$81,000	$71,000
GDP growth (2015–2075)	4.8%	3.9%	11.4%
Total population	78 million	50 million	28 million

However, there is a downside to this. The role of neighboring powers in a unified Korea will change. For example, there will continue to be competition between Russia and China to increase their influence on the Korean Peninsula.

=== International impact ===
If Korea is unified under the ROK government in the south, it would mean the reunified Korea will not be a successor state, but an enlarged continuation of the South Korean state that was founded on 15 August 1948. In effect, the reunited Korea would likely retain the South Korean memberships in the United Nations and other international organizations while losing some memberships in other international organizations which North Korea currently holds.

== See also ==
- 2018 North Korea–United States Singapore Summit
- 2019 North Korea–United States Hanoi Summit
- 2019 Koreas–United States DMZ Summit
- 23880 Tongil (asteroid honoring reunification process)
- Peace Treaty on Korean Peninsula
- Seoul–Pyongyang hotline

== Sources ==
- Kim Il-bong (2017). Reunification Question (PDF). Understanding Korea. Vol. 10. Translated by Kim Myong-chan; Pak Hyo-song. Pyongyang: Foreign Languages Publishing House. ISBN 978-9946-0-1647-4. Archived from the original (PDF) on 1 December 2017.
