= Arch of Reunification =

Monument in Pyongyang, North Korea (2001–2024)

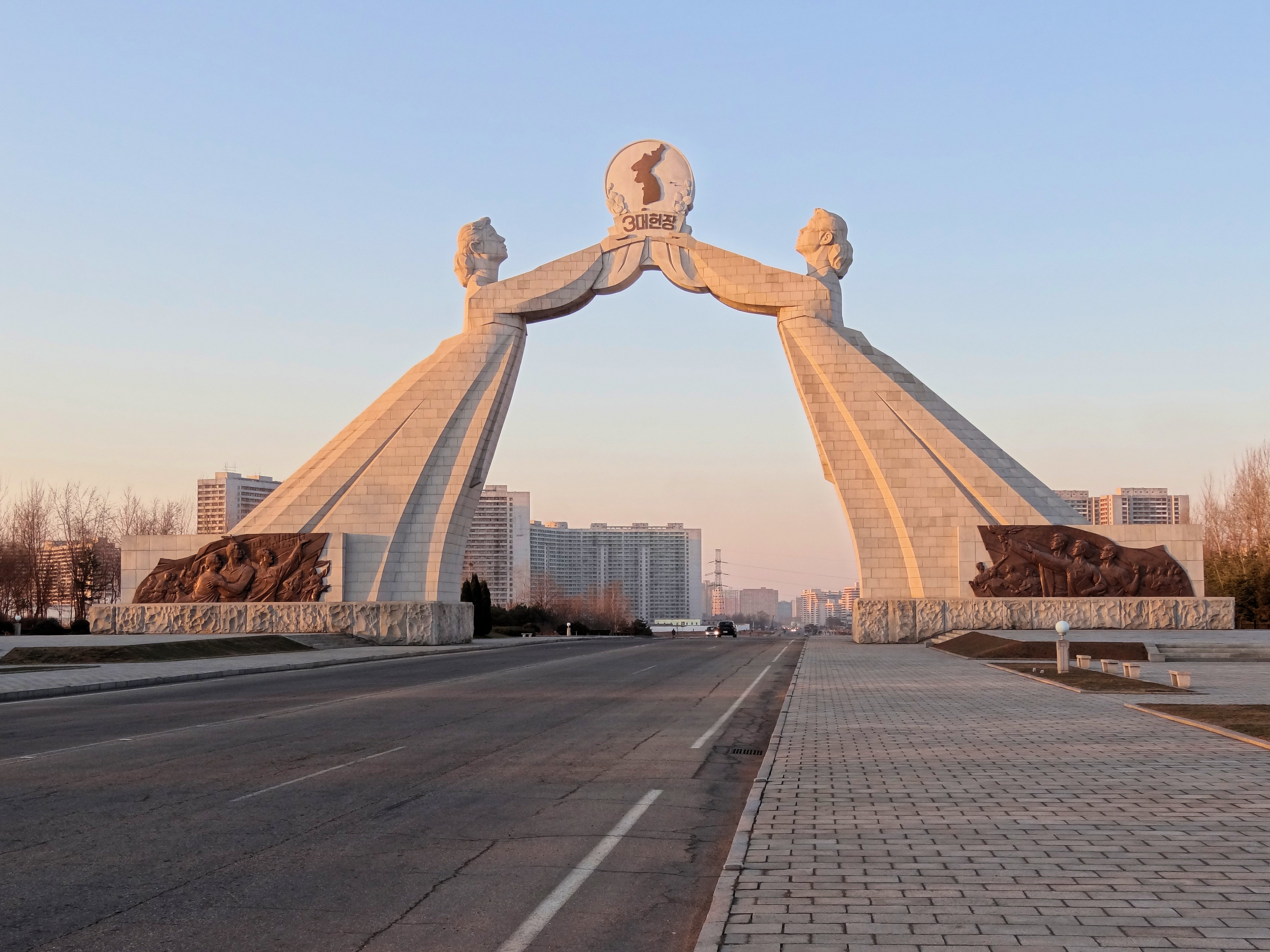
- Arch of Reunification in 2014
- Interactive map of Arch of Reunification
- Location: Pyongyang, North Korea
- Coordinates: 38°57′52.300″N 125°42′56.940″E
- Width: 61.5 metres (202 ft)
- Height: 30 metres (98 ft)
- Opening date: August 2001; 24 years ago
- Dedicated to: Three Principles of National Reunification; Plan of Establishing the Democratic Federal Republic of Koryo; Ten Point Programme for Reunification of the Country
- Dismantled date: January 2024; 2 years ago

Korean name
- Chosŏn'gŭl: 조국통일3대헌장^기념탑
- Hancha: 祖國統一三大憲章紀念塔
- Revised Romanization: Joguk Tongil Samdae Heonjang Ginyeomtap
- McCune–Reischauer: Choguk T'ongil Samtae Hŏnjang Kinyŏmt'ap

The Arch of Reunification, officially the Monument to the Three-Point Charter for National Reunification, was a sculptural arch located south of Pyongyang, the capital of North Korea. It was opened in August 2001 to commemorate Korean reunification proposals put forward by Kim Il Sung. Made of concrete, the arch straddled the multi-laned Reunification Highway leading from Pyongyang to the Korean Demilitarized Zone. The arch appeared on postage stamps issued in 2002, 2015, 2016, and 2021. The monument was demolished in January 2024 after North Korea abandoned reunification.

== History ==
North Korea broke ground for the monument on 14 August 1999. It initially aimed to finish the arch by 15 August 2000, marking the 55th anniversary of Korea's liberation from Japan. The original plan was to have a 55-metre pillar with three branches to represent Koreans in the north, the south, and overseas. In July 2000, the Korean-American website Minjok Tongshin reported North Korea would change the location and design of the monument, supposedly because it received more support and commemorative bricks from South Korea than expected. According to NK News, North Korea's decision reportedly came shortly after the 2000 inter-Korean summit. In November 2000, the website published the first image of the arch's final design. The monument was completed by August 2001; Rodong Sinmun, the newspaper of the ruling Workers' Party of Korea (WPK), described it as a "grand monument to the 10,000-year grand plan of the era of the Workers’ Party of Korea."

=== Demolition ===
In December 2023, during his remarks at a Plenum of the WPK's Central Committee, Kim Jong Un accused South Korea of becoming a "forward military base and nuclear arsenal" of the United States amid increased U.S. drills and deployment of some military assets near the Korean peninsula. At that time Kim announced that he had ruled out the possibility of reunification with South Korea through peaceful means and that North Korea must fundamentally change its relations with South Korea to one that is between two hostile states. North Korea ultimately vowed to launch three new spy satellites, build military drones and boost its nuclear arsenal by 2024.

In January 2024, Kim called for the destruction of the Arch of Reunification, in a further step towards abandoning the goal of peaceful reunification. In a speech at the Supreme People's Assembly on 15 January of that year, Kim called the monument an "eyesore" and, according to official media, ordered the constitution be amended to say the South was a "primary foe and invariable principal enemy".

The arch was demolished some time between 19 and 23 January 2024, according to satellite imagery. The news that the Arch of Reunification had been demolished was confirmed by the Ministry of Unification of South Korea on 24 January 2024.

== Design ==
The arch consisted of two Korean women in traditional dress (chosŏn-ot), symbolizing the North and the South, leaning forward to jointly uphold a sphere bearing a map of a reunified Korea. The sphere is the emblem of the Three Charters: the Three Principles of National Reunification, the Plan of Establishing the Democratic Federal Republic of Korea, and the Ten Point Programme for Reunification of the Country. The arch's lower part featured bronze bas-reliefs on both sides showing independence movement scenes. The plinth of the structure was engraved with messages of support for reunification and peace from various individuals, organizations, and nations. The arch was completed at the height of the so-called Sunshine Policy, a South Korean government effort to reduce the risk of conflict between the two states and reconcile with the North. The width of the Arch of Reunification, 61.5 metres, was a reference to the June 15th North–South Joint Declaration of 2000, and its height at 30 meters, a reference to the Three Principles of National Reunification.

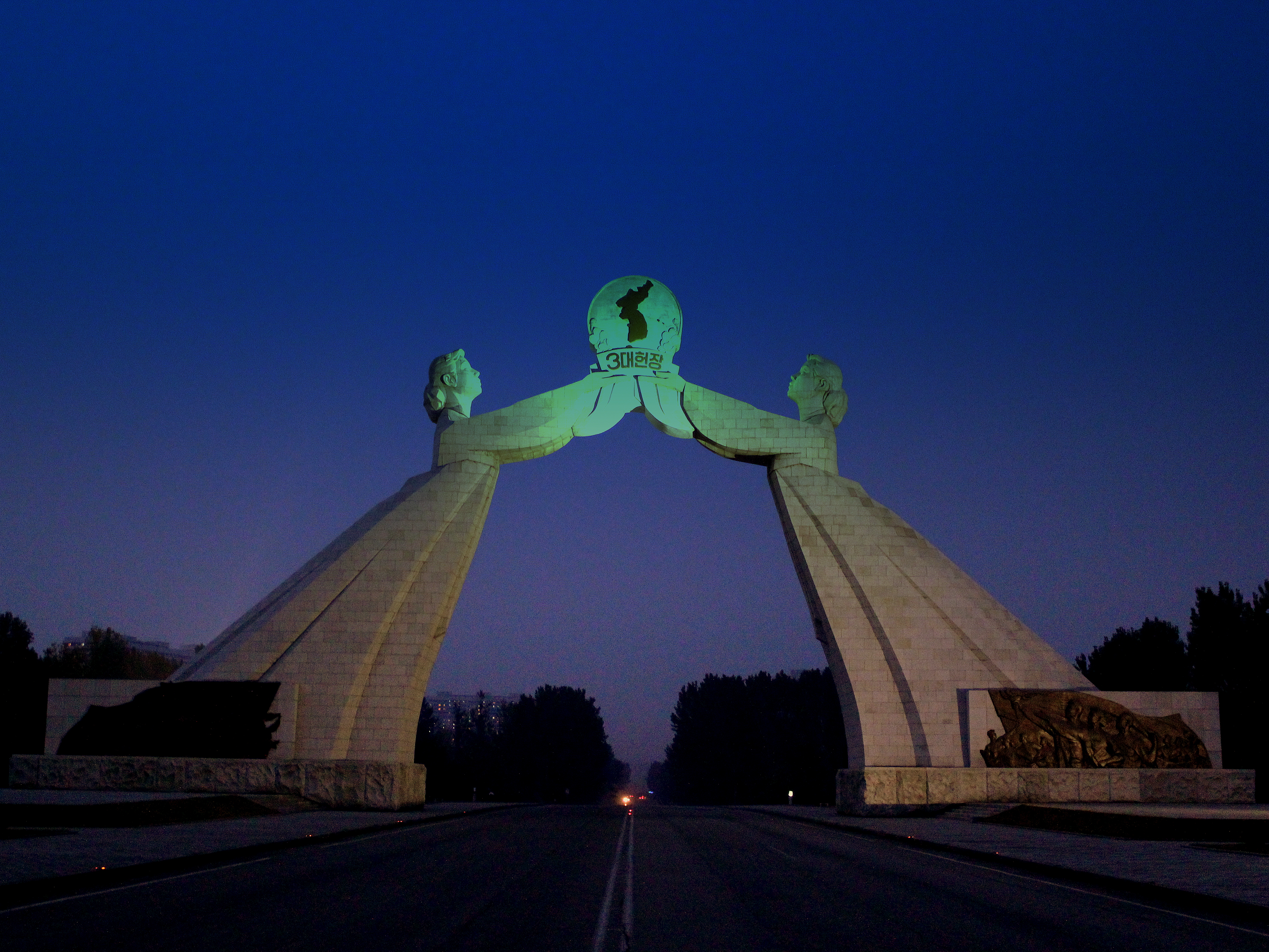
The arch at night

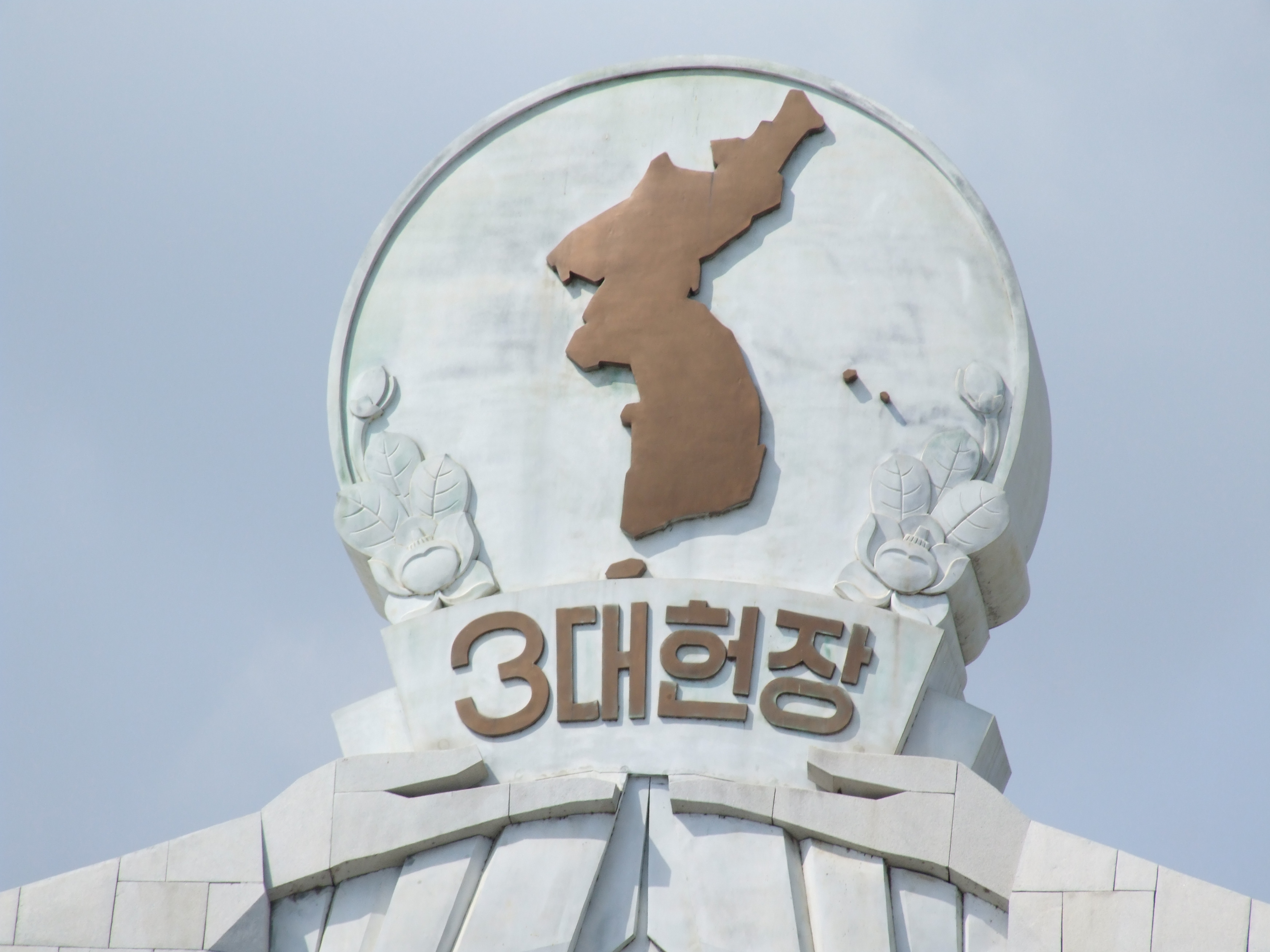
Detail showing the apex of the arch, with image of the Korean Peninsula and islands (Jeju, Ulleungdo, Dokdo) and Korean text 3대헌장 (samdae heonjang, "3-point charter")

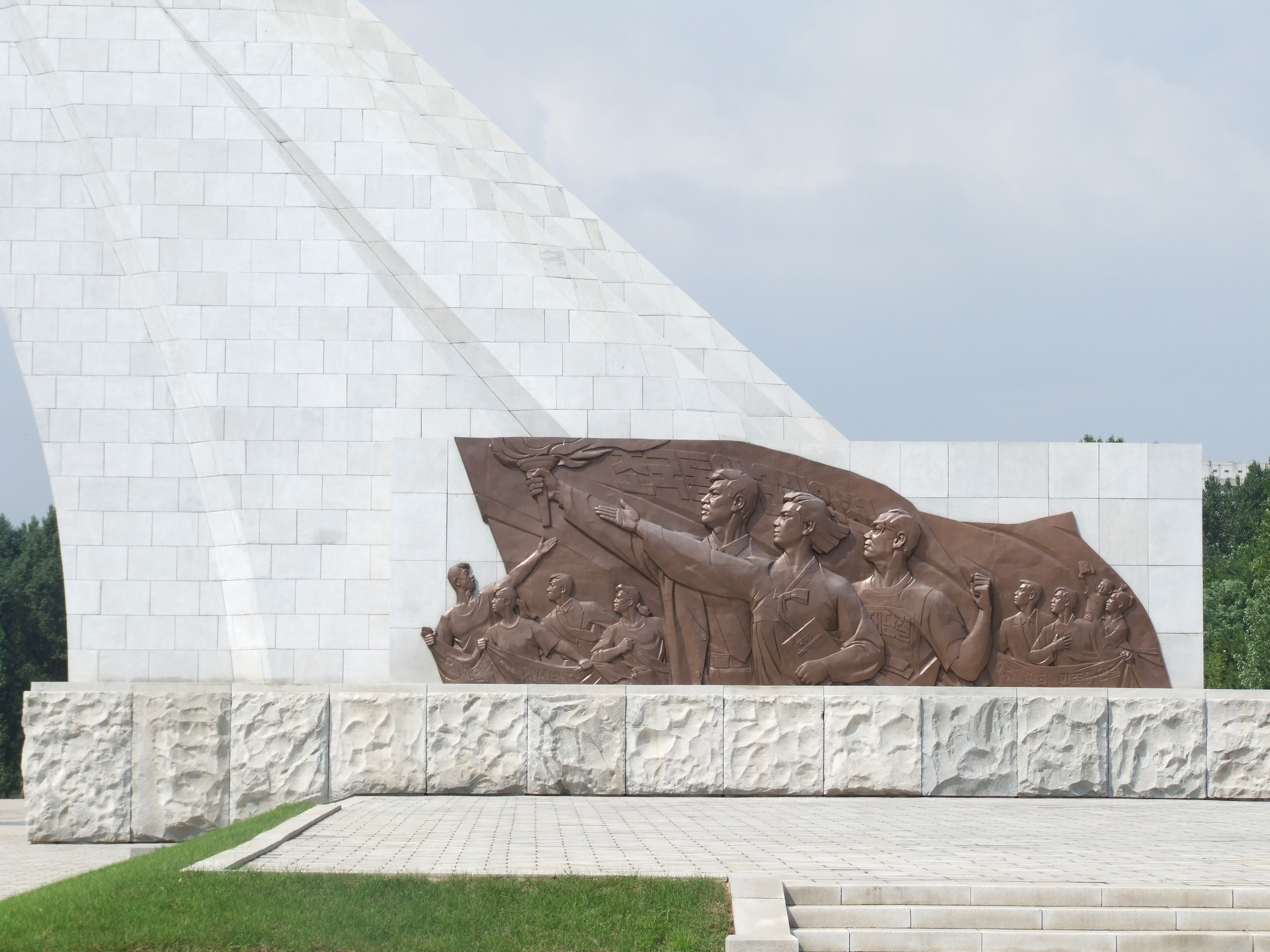
Bronze relief at base showing the Korean people

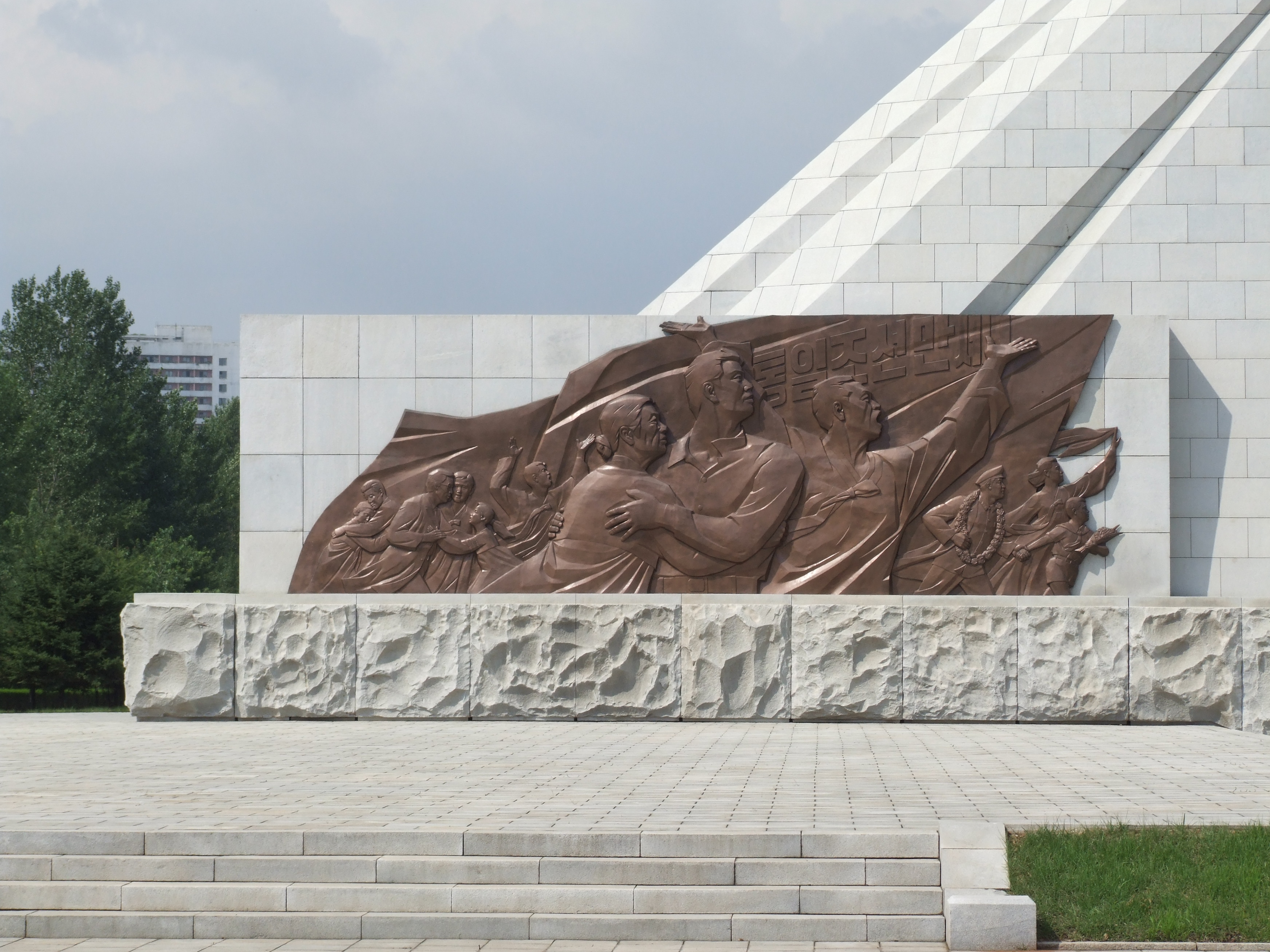
Bronze relief at base showing the Korean people
