= United Front Department of the Workers' Party of Korea =

North Korean governmental agency tasked with relations with South Korea

United Front Department of the Central Committee of the Workers' Party of Korea
- 통일전선부
- Emblem of the Workers' Party of Korea

Agency overview
- Jurisdiction: North Korea–South Korea relations, Propaganda, front organizations, espionage
- Headquarters: Junseung-dong, Moranbong District, Pyongyang, North Korea
- Employees: 3,000
- Agency executive: Ri Son-gwon, Director
- Parent agency: Central Committee

Korean name
- Hangul: 통일전선부
- Hanja: 統一戰線部
- RR: Tongil jeonseonbu
- MR: T'ongil chŏnsŏnbu

The United Front Department of the Workers' Party of Korea (UFD, Korean: 통일전선부) is a department of the Central Committee of the Workers' Party of Korea (WPK) tasked with relations with South Korea. It conducts propaganda operations and espionage and manages front organizations, including the Chongryon.

== History ==
The United Front Department (UFD) is one of the most longstanding and important departments of the party. It was initially known as the Culture Department (munhwabu). It was one of many organizations tasked with targeting South Korea at the time. In 1977 its operations were revived and it got its current name.

During the rule of Kim Jong Il, the department had its ups and downs. UFD is known to have meddled in the 1997 South Korean presidential election and tried to prevent the election of Kim Dae-jung. It was the subject of major purges in 2006, 2007, and 2008. There were apparently issues with corruption and lack of oversight.

In May 2024, after Kim Jong Un called for large changes in North Korea's reunification policy, South Korean Unification Minister Kim Yung-ho said that the UFD has been demoted and changed into the "Workers' Party of Korea Central Committee 10 Bureau" and said that they believe the reorganized entity is tasked with psychological warfare. Seoul-based Daily NK also reported major shifts, saying that most of the duties and staff of the UFD was transferred to the Ministry of Foreign Affairs and the Reconnaissance General Bureau (RGB). It said that the Ministry of Foreign Affairs would now be responsible for handling relations with the South, while the RGB will take over UFD's propaganda and clandestine operations in the South. Daily NK later reported in July 2025 that the National Reunification Institute under the UFD's Committee for the Peaceful Reunification of the Fatherland was renamed to the Institute of Enemy State Studies and placed under 10 Bureau.

In March 2026, the 10th Bureau of the Central Committee of the Workers' Party of Korea was reorganized and placed under the jurisdiction of the Ministry of Foreign Affairs. Jang Kum-chol concurrently served as the head of the 10th Bureau of the Central Committee of the Workers' Party of Korea and the First Vice Foreign Minister of the Ministry of Foreign Affairs. After this reorganization, the 10th Bureau of the Workers' Party of Korea was under the jurisdiction of the North Korean cabinet, which has less power than the WPK, and its departmental status was reduced to a ministerial level unit. In June 2026, its title was reported as the "10th Bureau of the Ministry of Foreign Affairs of the Democratic People's Republic of Korea".

== Organization ==
Administratively, UFD reports as an agency of the Secretariat of the Central Committee of the Workers' Party of Korea. UFD is in charge of espionage, diplomacy, and policy-making concerning South Korea. UFD has been the primary organization of all state and party organizations that are tasked with relations with South Korea. The Ministry of Foreign Affairs, for instance, has not historically not address relations with the South. Of the other organizations dealing with South Korea, the UFD differs in conducting its activities in the open. It also controls North Korea's religious organizations, including the Korean Christian Federation and Korean Buddhist Federation.

UFD is part of a shadowy group of Central Committee organizations known as the "Third Building". Not much is known about these organizations because South Korean intelligence services have been reluctant to release information out of security concerns. Out of the "Third Building" organizations, UFD is specifically tasked with maintaining ties with front organizations in both North and South Korea and with overseas Koreans. One of the most powerful of these, the Chongryon representing pro-Pyongyang Zainichi Koreans in Japan, is controlled by the UFD. Other front organizations that have been controlled by the UFD include the Korean Association of Social Scientists, Korea Asia-Pacific Peace Committee, National Reconciliation Council, and the Committee for the Peaceful Reunification of the Fatherland. North Korea typically deals with front organizations instead of the South Korean government which lacks legitimacy in its eyes. UFD also sends spies to Japan. Accordingly, it is sometimes classified as an intelligence agency.

UFD is based in a complex in Junseung-dong in the Moranbong District of Pyongyang. It shares the complex with the Social Culture Department and Operations Department. It has about 3,000 employees. Certain members are among the most influential people in North Korea. The current director is Ri Son-gwon.

UFD handles affairs of the Kaesong Industrial Region. It tends to view the region as a manageable risk with a high profit, which is not universally agreed upon in the North Korean administration. UFD was also normally tasked with the Mount Kumgang Tourist Region. When relations with South Korea take a turn for the worse, other organizations are known to take UFD's responsibilities. For instance, in 2008 the National Defence Commission took over relations with the South.

== Propaganda ==
UFD controls broadcasts that target South Korea. Its methods include psychological warfare through the radio and TV, loudspeakers, leaflets, visual displays, and websites. According to reports, "The United Front Department wages its cyber psychological warfare through some 140 sites with servers based in 19 countries. In 2011, North Korean agents posted 27,090 items of propaganda materials against the South, and in 2012 some 41,373". It also maintains a team of internet trolls with the Reconnaissance General Bureau. The radio station targeting South Korea, Voice of National Salvation, is directly controlled by the UFD instead of the Korean Central Broadcasting Committee that normally manages external broadcasting.

UFD often releases statements that are considered to be authoritative comments of the regime. It also fabricates praise of the Kim family that it attributes to foreigners and then disseminates in North Korean media.

Jang Jin-sung, a poet and North Korean defector, worked for the UFD before escaping the country. He has chronicled his work at the department in his book Dear Leader: My Escape from North Korea (2014).

== Department heads ==
| Portrait | Name | Start | End |
|---|---|---|---|
| | Kim Jung-rin | November 1977 | ? |
| | Kim Yong-sun | ? | 2001 |
| | Kim Yang-gon | 2007 | 2015 |
| | Kim Yong-chol | 4 January 2016 | 2019 |
| | Jang Kum Chol | 2019 | 2021 |
| | Kim Yong-chol | 2021 | 11 June 2022 |
| | Ri Son-gwon | 11 June 2022 | Incumbent |

== See also ==
- Korean reunification
- North Korea–South Korea relations
- United front
- United Front Work Department of the Chinese Communist Party
- Trafficking Department and International Politics and Economics Department of the Socialist Unity Party of Germany, similarly tasked with subverting West Germany.
- Propaganda in North Korea
- Inter-Korean summits
- Kim Yong-sun, former vice chairman of UFD
