= Ri Son-gwon =

North Korean military officer

Senior Colonel Ri Son-gwon
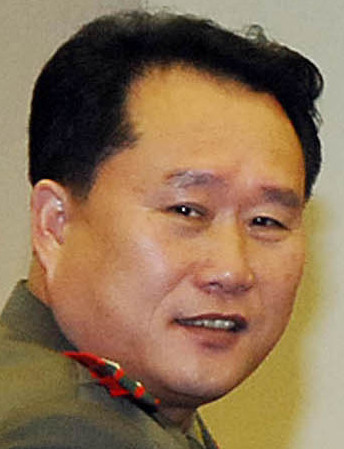

Vice Chairman of the Standing Committee of the Supreme People's Assembly
- Incumbent
- Assumed office 22 March 2026
- Chairman: Jo Yong-won

Chairman of the Korean Social Democratic Party
- Incumbent
- Assumed office February 2026
- Preceded by: Kim Ho-chol

Head of the United Front Department of the Workers' Party of Korea
- In office 11 June 2022 – February 2026
- General Secretary: Kim Jong Un
- Preceded by: Kim Yong-chol

Minister of Foreign Affairs
- In office 21 January 2020 – 11 June 2022
- President: Kim Jong Un
- Premier: Kim Tok Hun; Kim Jae-ryong
- Preceded by: Ri Yong-ho
- Succeeded by: Choe Son-hui

Personal details
- Party: Korean Social Democratic Party; Workers' Party of Korea

Military service
- Allegiance: North Korea
- Branch/service: Korean People's Army
- Rank: Senior Colonel

Korean name
- Hangul: 리선권
- Hanja: 李善權
- RR: Ri Seongwon
- MR: Ri Sŏn'gwŏn

Ri Son-gwon (Korean: 리선권) is a North Korean politician and diplomat, best known for having served as chairman of the Committee for the Peaceful Reunification of the Fatherland prior to its dissolution in January 2024. Between January 2020 and June 2022, he served as the Minister of Foreign Affairs.

== Career ==
Ri led a North Korean delegation for the first high-level inter-Korean talks in more than two years in January 2018. He was once known the right-hand man of Kim Yong-chol, and appeared at a second round of inter-Korean working-level military talks in October 2006. He also served as a Senior Colonel within the Korean People's Army.

In January 2020, he was named in media reports as the successor for Foreign Minister Ri Yong-ho.

On 11 February 2021, he was elected as a member of the Politburo of the Workers' Party of Korea. On 11 June 2022, during the fifth enlarged plenary meeting of the 8th Central Committee of the WPK, Ri was appointed the head of the United Front Department. He was succeeded by Choe Son-hui as the Minister of Foreign Affairs. During the 9th Congress of the Workers' Party of Korea in February 2026, he stepped down from the WPK Central Committee. In March 2026, North Korean state media identified Ri as the chairman of the Korean Social Democratic Party. On 22 March, he was elected as a vice chairman of the Supreme People's Assembly Standing Committee.

Political offices
Preceded by Ri Yong-ho	Minister of Foreign Affairs; 2020–2022	Succeeded by Choe Son-hui
