= DPRK Today =

China-based North Korean News site

- Available in: English, Korean, Chinese, Russian
- Dissolved: 11 January 2024
- Owner: Pyongyang Moranbong Editorial Bureau
- Website: dprktoday.com/home/e
- Current status: Offline

DPRK Today (Korean: 조선의 오늘, Hanja: 朝鮮의 오늘) was a propaganda website sponsored by the government of North Korea. It published articles in English, Korean, Chinese, and Russian and was operated by the Pyongyang Moranbong Editorial Bureau.

== History ==
DPRK Today carried articles that included threats of nuclear attacks against neighbouring South Korea and commentary endorsing U.S. President Donald Trump during his 2016 presidential campaign. On 18 September 2020, DPRK Today entered into a partnership with the pro–North Korea propaganda website CEPS-BR (Songun Policy Studies Center – Brazil). The website has been offline since 11 January 2024, after North Korean leader Kim Jong Un called for a "fundamental turnaround" in North Korea's policy towards reunification and South Korea.

== Purpose ==
DPRK Today was used to disseminate the North Korean government's policies and political messaging, as well as to promote the country's economic interests. It has been described by reporters in the United States and elsewhere as a propaganda outlet for the regime.
