= June 15th North–South Joint Declaration =

2000 joint Korean statement

- Hangul: 남북 공동선언
- Hanja: 南北共同宣言
- Revised Romanization: Nambuk Gongdong Seoneon
- McCune–Reischauer: Nambuk Kongdong Sŏnŏn

North Korean name
- Hangul: 북남공동선언
- Hanja: 北南共同宣言
- Revised Romanization: Bungnam Gongdong Seoneon
- McCune–Reischauer: Pungnam Kongdong Sŏnŏn

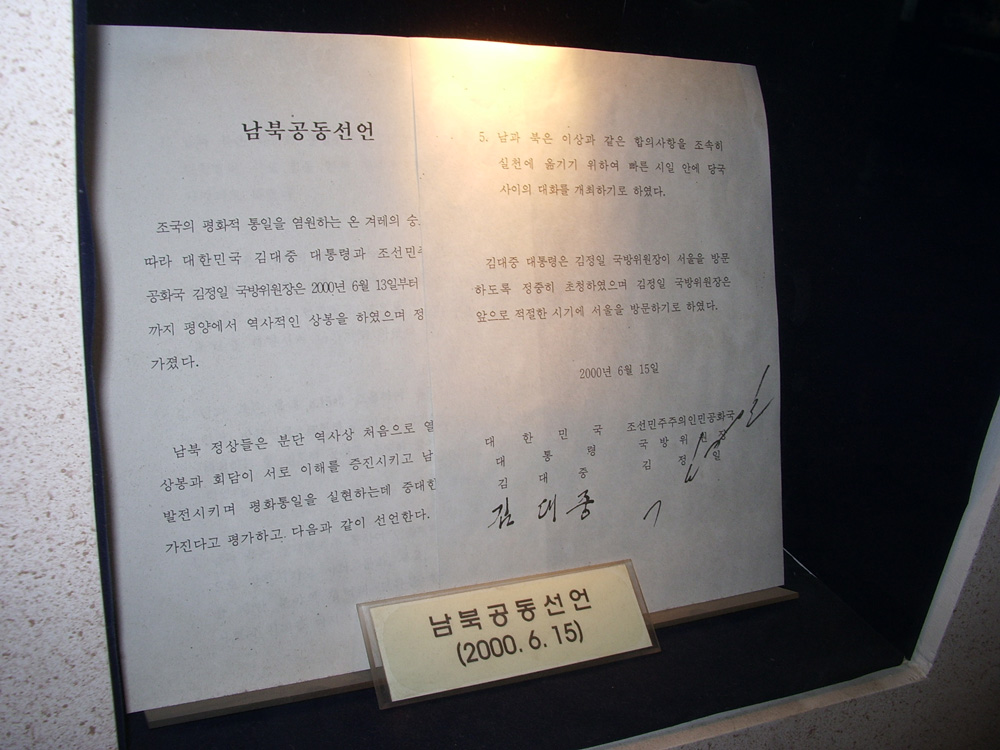
The first and last page of the declaration on display at the Unification Observatory in Paju, South Korea

The June 15th North–South Joint Declaration was adopted between leaders of North Korea and South Korea in June 2000 after various diplomatic meetings between the North and South. As a result of the talks, numerous separated families and relatives from the North and the South had meetings with their family members in Pyongyang and Seoul.

According to the North–South Joint Declaration, the North-South ministerial talks and North–South military working-level talks were held four times in Pyongyang, Seoul and Jeju Island from July to December 2000.

== Text of North–South Joint Declaration ==
In accordance with the noble will of the entire people who yearn for the peaceful reunification of the nation, President Kim Dae-jung of the Republic of Korea and National Defence Chairman Kim Jong-il of the Democratic People's Republic of Korea held a historic meeting and summit talks in Pyongyang from June 13 to 15, 2000.

The leaders of the South and the North, recognizing that the meeting and the summit talks were of great significance in promoting mutual understanding, developing South–North relations and realizing peaceful reunification, declared as follows:

1. The South and the North have agreed to resolve the question of reunification independently and through the joint efforts of the Korean people, who are the masters of the country.
2. For the achievement of reunification, we have agreed that there is a common element in the South's concept of a confederation and the North's formula for a loose form of federation. The South and the North agreed to promote reunification in that direction.
3. The South and the North have agreed to promptly resolve humanitarian issues such as exchange visits by separated family members and relatives on the occasion of the August 15 National Liberation Day and the question of unswerving Communists serving prison sentences in the South.
4. The South and the North have agreed to consolidate mutual trust by promoting balanced development of the national economy through economic cooperation and by stimulating cooperation and exchanges in civic, cultural, sports, health, environmental and all other fields.
5. The South and the North have agreed to hold a dialogue between relevant authorities in the near future to implement the above agreements expeditiously.

President Kim Dae-jung cordially invited National Defence Commission Chairman Kim Jong-il to visit Seoul, and Chairman Kim Jong-il will visit Seoul at an appropriate time.

(signed) Kim Dae-jung, President, The Republic of Korea

(signed) Kim Jong-il, Chairman of the National Defence Commission, The Democratic People's Republic of Korea

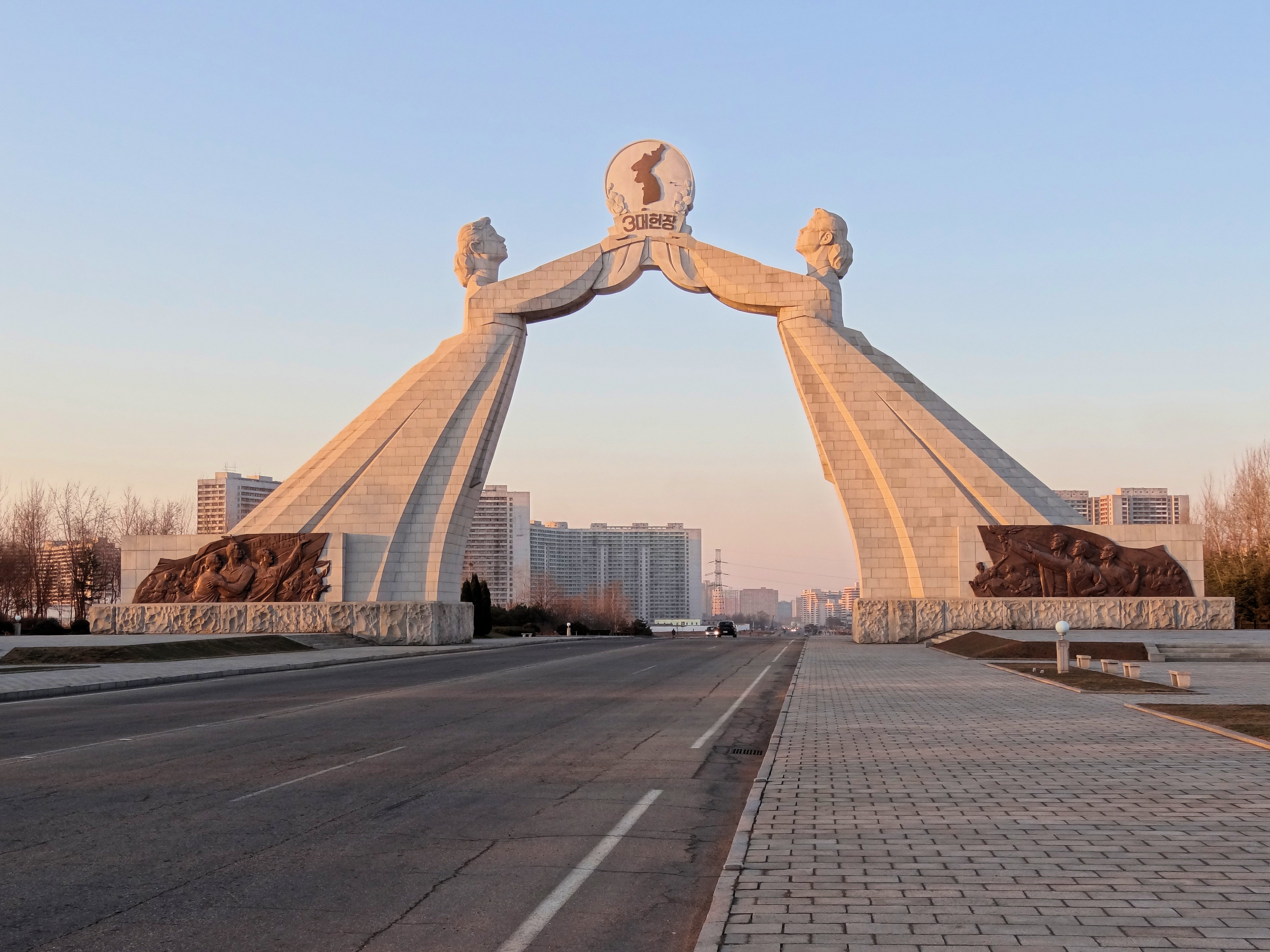
The width of Arch of Reunification, 61.5 metres, was a reference to the June 15th North–South Joint Declaration.

June 15, 2000

== See also ==
- Sunshine Policy
- Inter-Korean summits
- Unconverted long-term prisoners (the "unswerving Communists serving prison sentences in the South" referred to in point three)
- Ten Point Programme for Reunification of the Country
- July 4th North–South Korea Joint Statement
- 2007 North–South Summit Declaration
- Panmunjom Declaration
