= Ten Point Programme for Reunification of the Country =

1993 work by Kim Il Sung

10-Point Programme of the Great Unity of the Whole Nation for the Reunification of the Country 6 April 1993
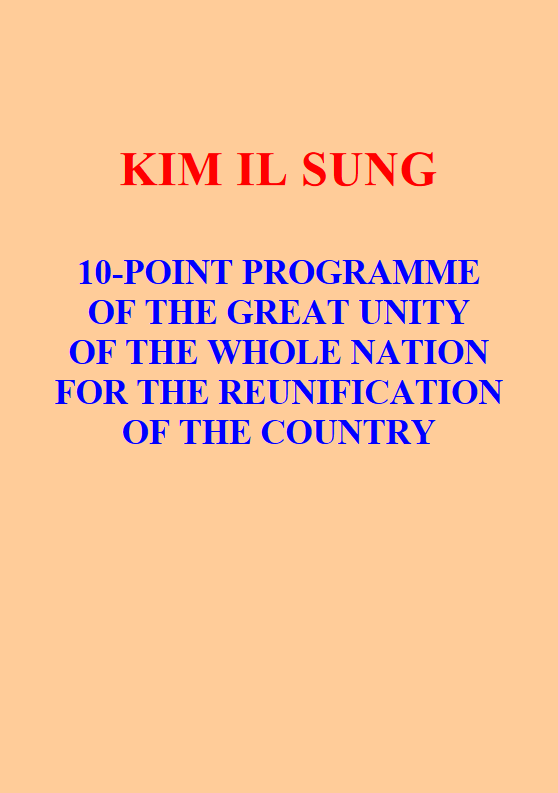
- Author: Kim Il Sung
- Subject: Korean reunification
- Publisher: Foreign Languages Publishing House
- Publication place: North Korea
- English publication date: 1993
- Pages: 4
- OCLC: 221782263

The Ten Point Programme for Reunification of the Country (Korean: 조국통일을위한전민족대단결10대강령) is a plan written by Kim Il Sung on 6 April 1993, to re-unite North Korea and South Korea. The program was the stated official policy of North Korea until 2024.

The plan's original title was 10-Point Programme of the Great Unity of the Whole Nation for the Reunification of the Country. It regards the idea of reunification with South Korea under a pan-national unified state, a Federation, leaving the two systems and governments intact while opening the borders.

The program proposes to remove outside influence from the Korean peninsula, especially the US forces based in South Korea, and proposes cooperation on trade and foreign affairs as a reunified country.

Until the early 2020s, the North Korean foreign policy was dominated by this original document, which has led to better relations with South Korea, beginning with Kim Dae-jung's Sunshine Policy, and in the June 15th North-South Joint Declaration.

== See also ==
- Kim Il Sung bibliography
- Korean reunification
- Korean Division
