= Kim Yong-chol =

North Korean politician (born 1946)

General of the Army Kim Yong-chol
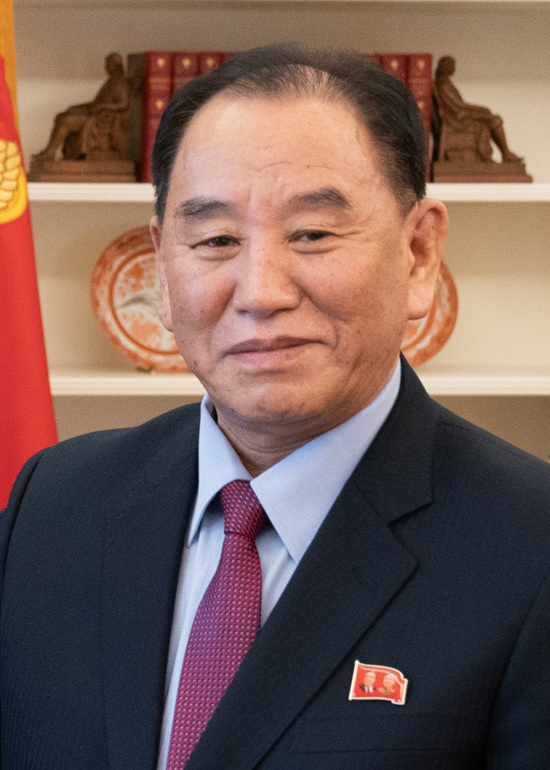
- Kim in January 2019

Head of the United Front Department of the Workers' Party of Korea
- In office 2021 – 11 June 2022
- Preceded by: Jang Kum Chol
- Succeeded by: Ri Son-gwon
- In office 4 January 2016 – 2019
- Preceded by: Kim Yang-gon
- Succeeded by: Jang Kum Chol

Vice Chairman of the Workers' Party of Korea
- In office 9 May 2016 – 10 January 2021
- Chairman: Kim Jong Un
- Preceded by: Hwang Pyong-so
- Succeeded by: Office abolished

Director of the Reconnaissance General Bureau
- In office 11 February 2009 – 4 January 2016
- Supreme Leader: Kim Jong Il; Kim Jong Un
- Preceded by: Office established
- Succeeded by: Pak Yong-sik (Acting)

Personal details
- Born: 1946 (age 79–80) Ryanggang Province, Soviet occupied Korea
- Party: Workers' Party of Korea
- Education: Kim Il Sung Military University; Red Flag Mangyongdae Revolutionary School

Military service
- Allegiance: North Korea
- Branch: Korean People's Army
- Rank: General

Korean name
- Hangul: 김영철
- Hanja: 金英徹
- RR: Gim Yeongcheol
- MR: Kim Yŏngch'ŏl

Kim Yong-chol (Korean: 김영철; born 1946) is a North Korean general and politician.

From February 2009 to January 2016 he was the director of the Reconnaissance General Bureau, the country's primary intelligence service. From 2016 to 2019, and again from 2021 to 2022, he served as the head of the United Front Department of the Workers' Party of Korea. He also served as the vice chairman of the Workers' Party of Korea for South Korean affairs from 2016 to 2021.

== Early life ==
Kim Yong-chol was born in 1946 in Ryanggang Province.

== Career ==
In 1962 he served in the 15th Division, a civil police company guarding the Korean Demilitarized Zone. In 1968 he was appointed a liaison officer to the United Nations Command, Military Armistice Commission, Korea. In 1976, he was made a division commander of the Supreme Guard Command. In 1990 he was promoted to major general and became deputy director of the Ministry of People's Armed Forces and director of the MPAF Reconnaissance Bureau. In 1998 he was elected as a deputy to the 10th Supreme People's Assembly and again in 2003 to the 11th.

In 2009, he was appointed director of the Reconnaissance General Bureau and Vice-Chief of the General Staff Department of the Korean People's Army. He was also elected as a deputy to the 12th Supreme People's Assembly. In 2010, he was promoted to Colonel-General and elected to the Central Military Commission of the Workers' Party of Korea and the 6th Central Committee of the Workers' Party of Korea. He was a member of the funeral committee of Jo Myong-rok. In 2011, he was a member of the funeral committee of Kim Jong Il.

External videos
- Arrival of Kim Yong-chol at the White House, June 1, 2018, C-SPAN

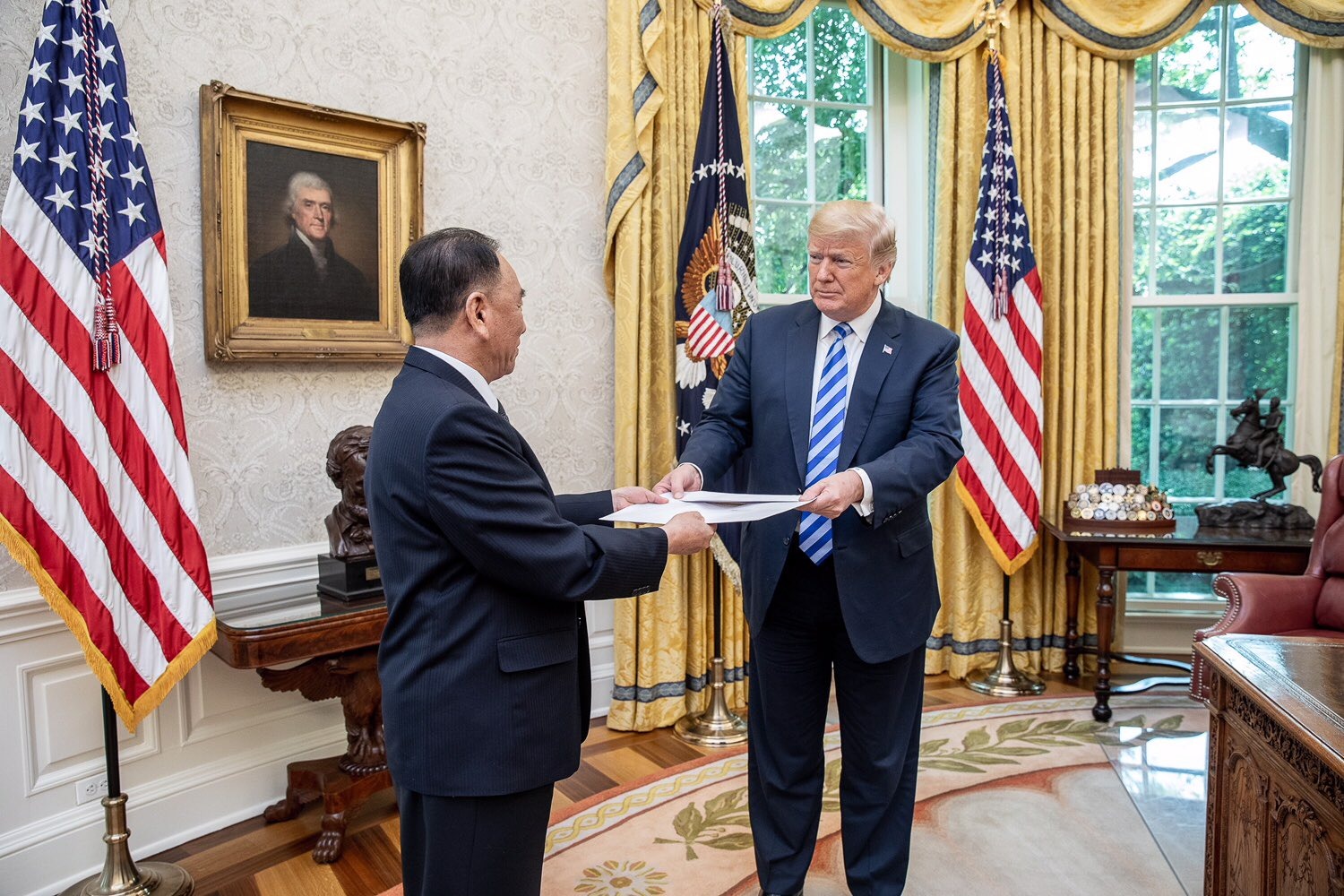
Kim delivering a letter from Chairman Kim to US President Trump in the Oval Office on June 1.

In 2012 he was promoted to general. In 2014, he was elected as a deputy to the 13th Supreme People's Assembly and served on the funeral committee of Jon Pyong-ho.

In May 2016, he was elected to the 7th Central Committee of the Workers' Party of Korea. He was elected as a member of the Politburo of the Workers' Party of Korea, the Central Military Commission of the Workers' Party of Korea and as Vice-Chairman of the Workers' Party of Korea. He was appointed director of the United Front Department and served on the funeral committees of Kang Sok-ju and Ryu Mi-yong, and he was elected to the Presidium of the Supreme People's Assembly.

Kim was sent as part of North Korea's Olympic delegation to the closing ceremony of the 2018 Winter Olympics held on 24 February 2018. His presence was controversial, mostly due to allegations that Kim was responsible for orchestrating an attack on a South Korean naval ship in 2010 that killed 46 sailors. An article in the Hangook Ilbo warned that Kim's attendance could send "raging waves" throughout the Korean Peninsula, but the games closed without incident.

On 30 May 2018, Kim flew to New York City via China for talks with United States Secretary of State Mike Pompeo regarding the 2018 North Korea–United States summit. He was hosted at a residential facility of the US delegation to the United Nations for highly "private" conversations with US counterparts. He then visited the White House for talks with the US President, Donald Trump on 1 June. During this meeting, he delivered a letter to Trump from Kim Jong Un. Because he is subject to US sanctions, the visit required a travel waiver.

On 24 April 2019, Yonhap News Agency reported that North Korea has removed Kim Yong-chol from the head of the United Front Department. After this, South Korean newspaper Chosun Ilbo, based on anonymous sources, reported that Kim was sent to a labour camp due to the failure of negotiations. These reports were disproven in june of the same year, after Kim appeared in a photo published by North Korean media, attending a musical event with Kim Jong Un and other officials.

In July 2020, it was reported that Kim Yong-chol was mentioned in a Rodong Sinmun article in relation to North-South communications working with Kim Yo Jong. Also prior to the article on 24 June 2020, Kim Yong-chol condemned remarks by the South Korean defence minister when he called for "mutual efforts" to reduce tensions between the two Koreas.

In June 2023, he was appointed an adviser of the United Front Department.

== Awards and honours ==
A picture of Kim shows him wearing the ribbons to all decorations awarded to him.

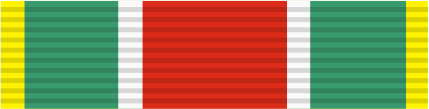

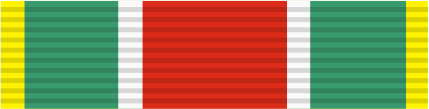
