= Committee for the Peaceful Reunification of the Fatherland =

North Korean state agency

Committee for the Peaceful Reunification of Korea
- 조국평화통일위원회

Agency overview
- Formed: 13 May 1961; 65 years ago
- Dissolved: 15 January 2024; 2 years ago
- Jurisdiction: Korean reunification
- Headquarters: Pyongyang, North Korea
- Parent agency: United Front Department

Korean name
- Hangul: 조국평화통일위원회
- Hanja: 祖國平和統一委員會
- RR: Joguk pyeonghwa tongil wiwonhoe
- MR: Choguk p'yŏnghwa t'ongil wiwŏnhoe

The Committee for the Peaceful Reunification of Korea (CPRK; Korean: 조국평화통일위원회) was a North Korean state agency aimed at promoting Korean reunification. The committee was tasked with relations with South Korea, which could not be handled through official channels because the North considers the South Korean government illegitimate. It was controlled by the United Front Department of the Workers' Party of Korea. The committee operated from 1961 until 2024, when North Korea stated that it no longer seeks reunification.

== Overview ==
The CPRK was not a governmental body per se but rather an offshoot of the Workers' Party of Korea's United Front Department; the distinction is intended to emphasise the North Korean government's position that the Southern government is illegitimate and should not be dealt with by official bodies. It was established on 13 May 1961 as part of Pyongyang's ongoing response to the South Korean April Revolution of the preceding year which had resulted in Syngman Rhee's resignation. The mere announcement of the CPRK's creation is believed to have exacerbated political instability in the South and to have contributed to the success of army general Park Chung-hee's coup three days later. In the aftermath of the Committee's creation, Pyongyang's reunification policy took a turn towards more pro-active means aimed at provoking the Southern government and inciting an internal Communist revolution there; Pyongyang concluded further military agreements with China and the Soviet Union, captured the USS Pueblo, attempted to assassinate Park Chung-hee in 1968 in what became known as the Blue House Raid, and shot down an American aircraft the following year. The CPRK conducted propaganda operations in South Korea and elsewhere abroad. During the fourth session of the 13th Supreme People's Assembly (SPA) on June 29, 2016, the committee was reorganized and elevated into a state agency.

On January 15, 2024, the Supreme People's Assembly of North Korea formally abolished the committee along with two other state bodies focusing on reunification with the South, the National Economic Cooperation Bureau and the Kumgangsan International Tourism Administration. South Korean reports indicated that websites ran by the CPRK, which were tasked with creating content for South Koreans, have not been accessible since the announcement. Daily NK later reported in July 2025 that the National Reunification Institute under the CPRK was renamed to the Institute of Enemy State Studies and placed under 10 Bureau.

== Membership ==
=== Former chairmen ===
- Hong Myong-hui(Founder)
- Kim Il (1980s)
- Ho Dam
- Yoon Ki-bok
- Kim Yong-sun
- Ri Son-gwon (until dissolution in 2024)

=== Former vice-chairmen ===
- Choe Deok-sin (until 1989)
- Kim Yong-sun (until 2003)
- Kim Ki-nam (c. 2005)
- Jon Jong-su (until dissolution in 2024)

== See also ==
- Ministry of Unification, a department of the South Korean government similar to CPRK
- North Korea–South Korea relations
- Ministry of Foreign Affairs (North Korea)
