= Lee Hu-rak =

South Korean politician (1924–2009)

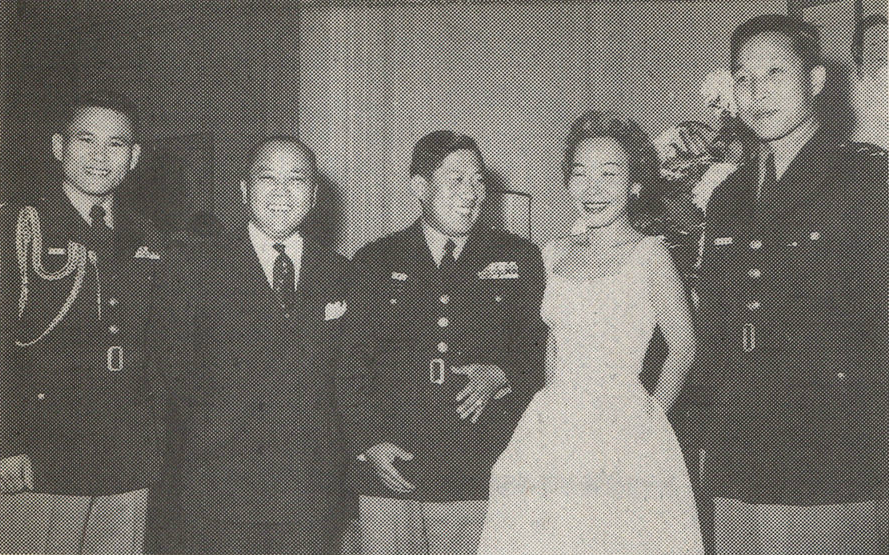
- Lee Hu-rak, first from left, as the military attaché to the Embassy of South Korea, Washington, D.C. in 1955.

Director of the Korean Central Intelligence Agency
- In office December 21, 1970 – December 2, 1973
- Preceded by: Kim Kye-won
- Succeeded by: Shin Jik-soo

Military service
- Allegiance: South Korea
- Branch/service: Republic of Korea Armed Forces
- Years of service: 1950–1961
- Rank: Major General
- Commands: Defense Counterintelligence Command; National Intelligence Service (South Korea)

Korean name
- Hangul: 이후락
- Hanja: 李厚洛
- RR: I Hurak
- MR: I Hurak

Lee Hu-rak (Korean: 이후락; 23 February 1924 – October 31, 2009) was a South Korean politician (chief of staff to Park Chung-hee from 1963 to 1969), diplomat (primarily as an ambassador to Japan from 1969 to 1970) and the Director of the Korea Central Intelligence Agency (KCIA) of South Korea from 1970 to 1973. From May 2 to the 5th 1972, during his time as Director of the KCIA, he traveled to Pyongyang on a secret diplomatic mission to meet Kim Il Sung and Pak Song-chol. These were the first formal diplomatic contacts between North Korea and South Korea and led to the July 4th North–South Korea Joint Statement. Then, it is alleged that he played a part in the kidnapping of Kim Dae-jung on August 8, 1973 from a Japanese hotel. He was also elected to the National Assembly in 1979 but was prohibited from political activity the following year on corruption charges corruption as a new military junta took power following Park's death. Although the restriction was lifted in 1985, he stayed out of any further participation in politics up until his death in 2009.
