= July 4 South–North Joint Statement =

1972 joint statement by South Korea and North Korea

- Hangul: 7·4 남북 공동 성명
- Hanja: 7·4 南北 共同 聲明
- RR: 7·4 Nambuk gongdong seongmyeong
- MR: 7·4 Nambuk kongdong sŏngmyŏng

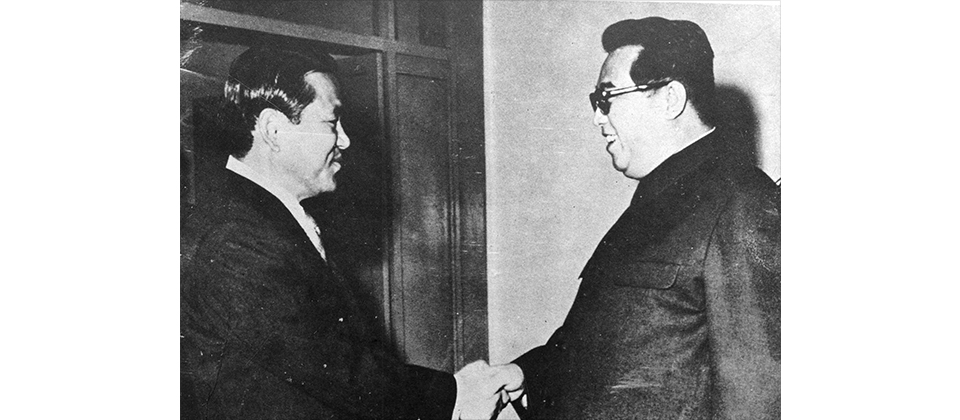
Lee Hu-rak and Kim Il Sung

The July 4 South–North Joint Statement, also known as the July 4 South–North Joint Communiqué, was the first joint statement by the governments of South Korea and North Korea, signed on July 4, 1972. The signatories of the statement were Lee Hu-rak and Kim Yong-ju, who represented the delegations from the south and north, respectively.

== Pre-statement meetings ==
On May 2, 1972, South Korean president Park Chung Hee sent Lee Hu-rak, the then-director of the Korean Central Intelligence Agency (KCIA), to Pyongyang to meet and discuss the prospects of improving inter-Korean relations and Korean reunification with North Korean premier Kim Il Sung. However, the North Korean delegation was represented by Kim Yong-ju, the director of North Korea's Organization and Guidance Department and Kim Il Sung's younger brother, instead of Kim Il Sung. The two delegations, headed by Lee and Kim, held talks over the course of four days, from May 2 to 5, 1972. North Korean Vice Premier Pak Song-chol, acting on behalf of Kim Yong-ju, later visited Seoul and held further talks with Lee Hu-rak from May 29 to June 1, 1972. A joint statement by the governments of the two Koreas was subsequently finalized on July 4, 1972.

== Three Principles of National Reunification ==
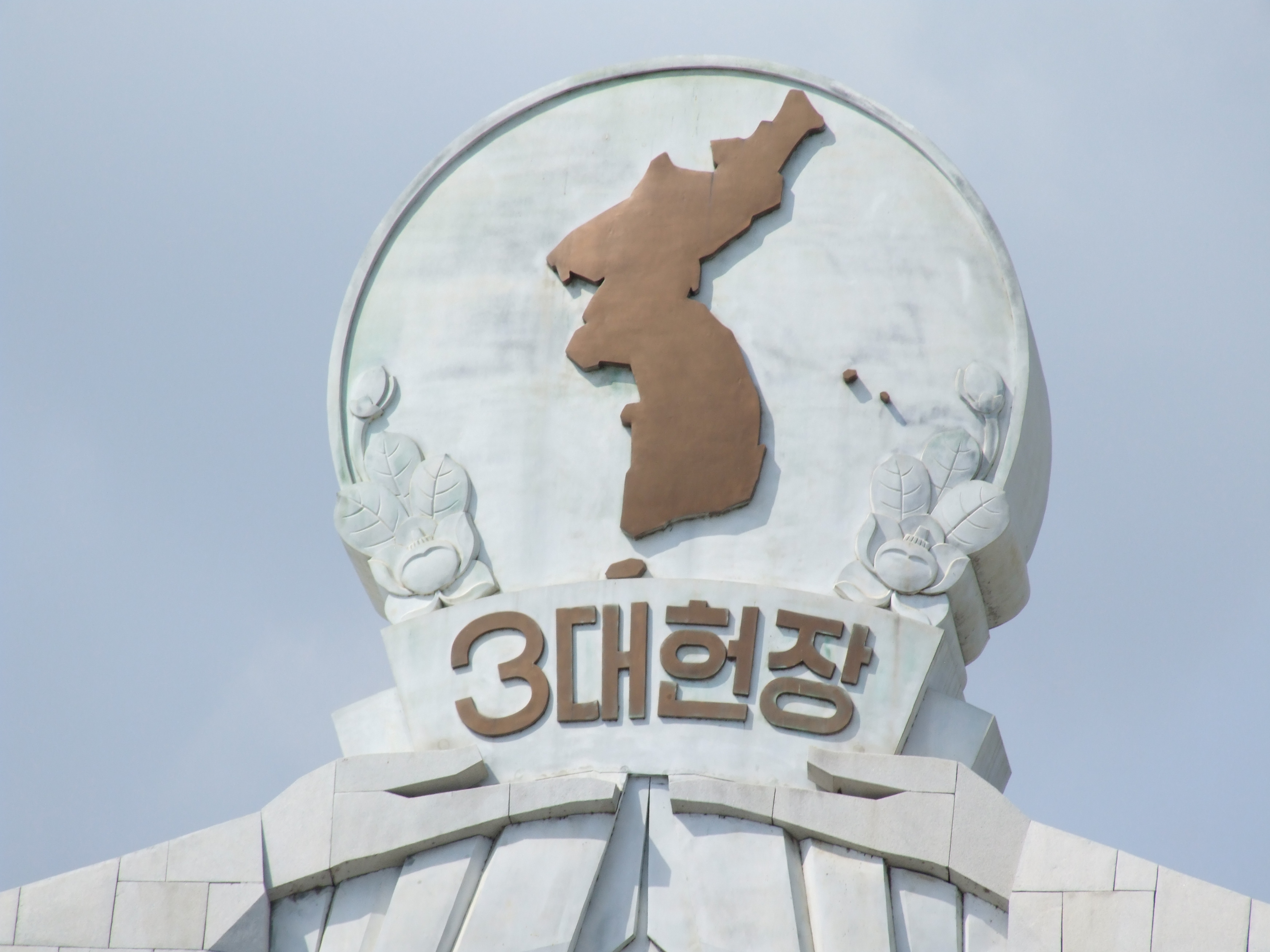
Arch of Reunification, North Korea, featuring a reference to the Three Principles (3대헌장).

The Three Principles of National Reunification (3대헌장) were proposed by General Secretary Kim Il Sung of North Korea in 1972 and can be summarised as achieving reunification independently, unitedly, and peacefully. They comprised the following points;

1) First, national reunification should be achieved independently without reliance on outside forces and free from their interference.

2) Secondly, great national unity should be promoted by transcending the differences in ideas, deals and systems.

3) Thirdly, national reunification should be achieved by peaceful means without resorting to arms.

The emblem of the Three Charters; the Three Principles of National Reunification was located on the Arch of Reunification located on the highway between Pyongyang and Kaesong.

The declared goals of the statement were "to remove the misunderstandings and mistrust, and mitigate heightened tensions ... between the South and North", and "to expedite unification".

== See also ==
- Inter-Korean summits
- Korean conflict
- Korean reunification
- Northern Limit Line
