= Kim Yong-sun =

North Korean politician (1936–2003)

- Born: 5 July 1934; South Pyongan Province, Korea, Empire of Japan
- Died: 26 October 2003 (aged 68–69); Pyongyang, North Korea
- Occupation: Vice-Chairman of the Committee for the Peaceful Reunification of the Fatherland
- Political party: Workers' Party of Korea

Korean name
- Hangul: 김용순
- Hanja: 金容淳
- RR: Gim Yongsun
- MR: Kim Yongsun

Kim Yong-sun (Korean: 김용순; 1934 – 26 October 2003) was a North Korean politician. At the time of his death, he was vice-chairman of the Committee for the Peaceful Reunification of the Fatherland. He was reported to have been killed in a car accident. He also held a position as a secretary (subordinate to the general secretary) of the Workers' Party of Korea (WPK).

== Career ==
Kim was born in 1934 in South Pyongan Province, when the Korean Peninsula was still under Japanese rule. He was elevated to the WPK's Central Committee in October 1980. He was a recipient of the Order of Kim Il Sung, the highest decoration of the North Korean government.

According to author Bradley K. Martin, Kim was interned in a 're-education camp' for three years from 1979 because he had an affair with a female colleague. According to author Don Oberdorfer, he was flamboyant and was demoted in the mid-1980s for decadent behavior. However, his career was saved because of his friendship with Kim Jong Il and his sister Kim Kyong-hui. In 1992, he visited New York City to prepare for North Korea's accession to the United Nations and held the highest-level US-DPRK diplomatic meetings to that time with Arnold Kanter, Richard Solomon, Douglas Paal, and James Lilley of the U.S. State Department.

Kim played an instrumental role in the planning of the first Inter-Korean summit between Kim Dae-jung and Kim Jong Il in June 2000. He came to the South in September that year as part of an official Northern delegation, and inspected POSCO facilities in Pohang; he was the first secretary of the WPK to take an inspection tour in the South since Ho Dam in 1985. After reportedly being involved in a car accident in June 2003, he was hospitalised, and succumbed to his injuries on 23 October 2003.
