= Kōkai Province =

1910–1945 province of Korea under Japan

Kōkai Province 黃海道
- Former province of Korea, Empire of Japan
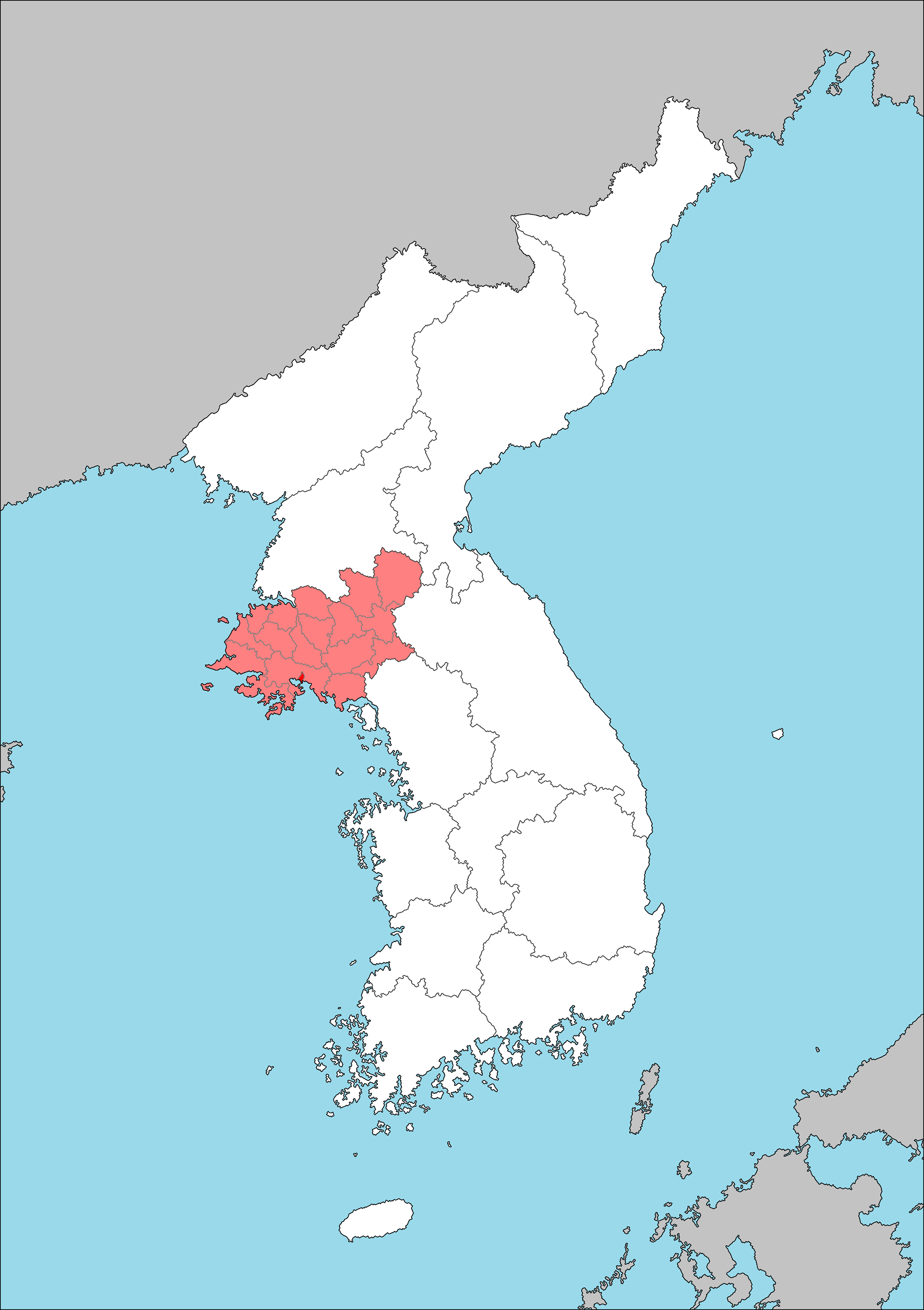
- Capital: Kaishū
- History
  - Established: 29 August 1910
  - Disestablished: 15 August 1945
- Today part of: North Korea; South Korea

Kōkai-dō (黃海道; Korean: 황해도), alternatively Kōkai Province, was a province of Korea under Japanese rule. Its capital was at Kaishū (now Haeju). The province consisted of what is now the Hwanghae Province of North Korea.

== Population ==
Number of people by nationality according to the 1936 census:

- Overall population: 1,639,250 people
  - Japanese: 20,582 people
  - Koreans: 1,614,738 people
  - Other: 3,970 people

== Administrative divisions ==
=== Cities ===
- Kaishū (海州) - (capital): Haeju (해주).

=== Counties ===
- Hekijō (碧城): Byeokseong (벽성). present Yeonpyeongdo in Byeokseong County is annexed in Incheon Metropolitan City.
- Enpaku (延白): Yeonbaek (연백).
- Kinsen (金川): Geumcheon (금천).
- Heizan (平山): Pyeongsan (평산).
- Shinkei (新溪): Singye (신계).
- Chōen (長淵): Jangyeon (장연). present Baengnyeongdo, Daecheongdo and Socheongdo in Jangyeon County are annexed in Incheon Metropolitan City.
- Shōka (松禾): Songhwa (송화).
- Inritsu (殷栗): Eunyul (은율).
- Angaku (安岳): Anak (안악).
- Shinsen (信川): Sincheon (신천).
- Sainei (載寧): Jaeryeong (재령).
- Kōshū (黃州): Hwangju (황주).
- Hōzan (鳳山): Bongsan (봉산).
- Zuikō (瑞興): Seoheung (서흥).
- Suian (遂安): Suan (수안).
- Kokuzan (谷山): Goksan (곡산).
- Ōshin (甕津): Ongjin (옹진).

== Provincial governors ==
Family Register	Name	Chinese Characters	Term of Office	Remarks
Korean	Cho Hŭi-mun	趙羲聞	October 1, 1910 – September 23, 1918	Governor of Hwanghae Province
Korean	Sin Ŭng-hŭi	申應熙	September 23, 1918 – February 12, 1921	Governor; from August 1919, Governor of Hwanghae Province
Korean	Pak Chung-yang	朴重陽	February 12, 1921 – February 24, 1923	
Naichijin	Iio Tōjirō	飯尾 藤次郎	February 24, 1923 – December 1, 1924	
Naichijin	Yanabe Eizaburō	矢鍋 永三郎	December 1, 1924 – August 11, 1925	
Naichijin	Imamura Takeshi	今村 武志	August 11, 1925 – March 29, 1928	
Korean	Pak Sang-jun	朴相駿	March 29, 1928 – November 28, 1929	
Korean	Han Kyubok	韓圭復	November 28, 1929 – April 7, 1933	
Korean	Chŏng Kyo-wŏn	鄭僑源	April 7, 1933 – February 20, 1937	
Korean	Kang P'il-sŏng	姜弼成	February 20, 1937 – December 21, 1939	
Korean	Kanemura Yasuo	金村 泰男	December 28, 1939 – January 24, 1942	Changed name from Kim Pyŏng-t'ae (金秉泰)
Korean	Yamaki Fuminori	山木 文憲	January 24, 1942 – October 23, 1942	Changed name from Song Mun-hŏn (宋文憲)
Naichijin	Usui Jūhei	碓井 忠平	October 23, 1942 – August 17, 1944	
Naichijin	Mine Gorō	美根 五郎	August 17, 1944 – December 21, 1944	
Naichijin	Yagi Nobuo	八木 信雄	December 21, 1944 – May 2, 1945	
Naichijin	Tsutsui Takeo	筒井 竹雄	May 2, 1945 – August 15, 1945	Tenure ended with Korea's independence

== See also ==
- Hwanghae Province
- Provinces of Korea
- Governor-General of Chōsen
- Administrative divisions of Korea
