= Hwanghae dialect =

Dialect of Korean

Hwanghae
- 황해 방언
- Native to: North Korea, South Korea
- Region: North Hwanghae Province, South Hwanghae Province (DPRK), Ongjin County, Incheon (ROK)
- Language family: Korean: Central; Hwanghae
- Dialects: North Hwanghae; South Hwanghae

Language codes
- ISO 639-3: –
- Glottolog: hwan1238
- IETF: ko-u-sd-kp06 (North Hwanghae) ko-u-sd-kp05 (South Hwanghae)

Hwanghae dialect (황해 방언) is a dialect of Korean spoken in North Hwanghae Province, South Hwanghae Province in North Korea, as well as the islands of Baengnyeongdo, Yeonpyeongdo and Daecheongdo in Ongjin County, Incheon, South Korea. It may also be spoken among former Korean War refugees in cities such as Incheon.

== Phonology ==
In the Hwanghae dialect there are nine vowels (ㅣ·ㅔ·ㅐ·ㅡ·ㅓ·ㅏ·ㅜ·ㅗ·ㅚ). Like the neighboring Pyongan dialect, the sound of 어(eo) and 으(eu) sounds closer to the 오(o) and 우(u). The medieval Korean vowel of ㆎ, as well as 의 is often pronounced as 에 (e.g. 나베, butterfly and 글페, two days after tomorrow). Difference in phonology is visible between northern areas, which contains influence from the Pyongan dialect and southern regions, which contains some influence from the Gyeonggi dialect.

== Grammar ==
Overall, the grammar of the Hwanghae dialect, particularly for certain suffixes for verbs and statements, are often divergent from standard Korean. Like the neighboring Pyongan dialect and the nonstandard speech of Northwestern Gyeonggi, the suffix '겠(get), used to display will or intention, is often pronounced as 갔 (gat) or 갓 (gas) depending on the region of Korea. The declarative suffix for verbs in the formal polite style of speech also diverges from the standard '습니다(seubnida)', With speakers of the Hwanghae dialect replacing the standard form with ‘-시다 (shida), -쉬다 (shwwida), -쉐다 (shweda)’ and ‘-외다 (oeda)'. A similar case occurs with the formal interrogative suffix '습니까 (seubnika)', which is replaced by ‘-시꺄 (shikya)', '시까 (shika)' -쉬꺄 (shwika)’ ‘-시니꺄 (shinika)?’ ‘-오리꺄(orikya)’ or ‘-ㄹ납니꺄 (labnikya)’. The polite present tense declarative for the informal polite style, '세요' (seyo) is also replaced by '시겨 (shigyeo)' in most regions of Hwanghae.

== Vocabulary ==
With the exception of certain terms, much of the vocabulary of the Hwanghae dialect is shared by either the Gyeonggi or Pyongan dialect. Some examples of dialectal words found in Hwanghae include:

고매하다 (gomaehada - to be thankful), 톰빨리 (tomballi - quickly), 멱자귀 (myeokjagwi - frog) and 면들레 (myeondeullae - Korean dandelion).
