= 2010 Yeonpyeongdo bombardment =

North–South Korea artillery engagement

Coordinates: 37°40′0″N 125°41′47″E

Bombardment of Yeonpyeongdo
- Part of the Korean conflict
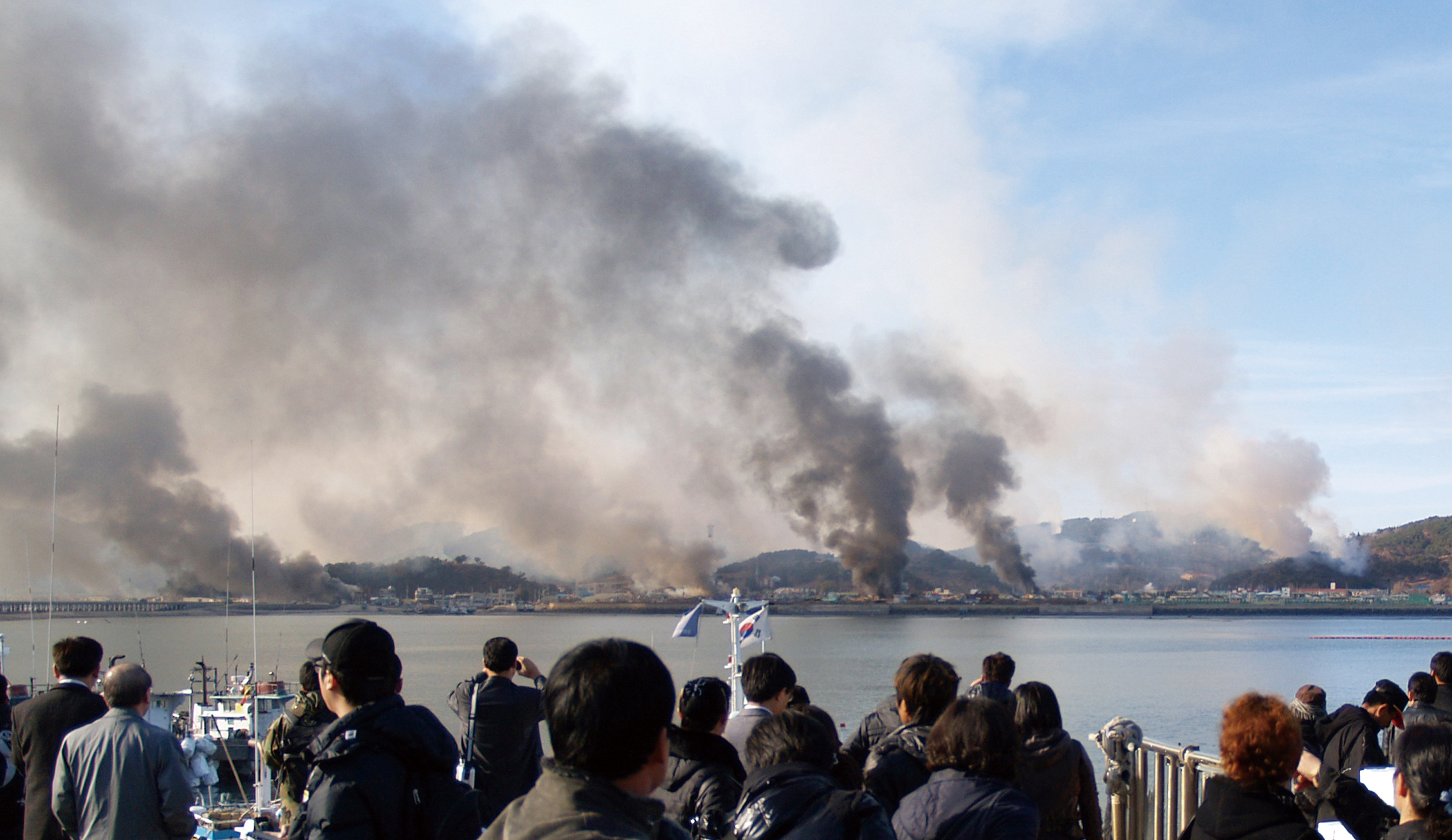
- Yeonpyeongdo under North Korean artillery attack
Date	23 November 2010
Location	Yeonpyeongdo, Ongjin County, Incheon, South Korea; Mudo and Kaemori, Kangryong County, South Hwanghae Province, North Korea
Result	Small number of fatalities and wounded suffered by the Republic of Korea (ROK); ROK civilian evacuation of Yeonpyeongdo. Tensions increased between the two countries.

Belligerents
North Korea	South Korea

Commanders and leaders
Kim Jong Il; Kim Jong Un; Ri Yong-ho; Col. Kim Kyong Su	Lee Myung-bak; Kim Tae-young

Strength
One battalion BM-21; Five MiG-23	Six K9 Thunder SPGs; Four F-15K; Four KF-16

Casualties and losses
North Korean claim: None; South Korean claim: 5–10 killed and 20–30 wounded (presumed)	2 soldiers killed 19 soldiers wounded 2 civilians killed 3 civilians wounded Two K9 self-propelled guns damaged

The Bombardment of Yeonpyeongdo (Korean: 연평도 포격전) was an artillery engagement between the North Korean military and South Korean forces stationed on the island Yeonpyeongdo on 23 November 2010. Following a South Korean artillery exercise in disputed waters near the island, North Korean forces fired around 170 artillery shells and rockets at Yeonpyeongdo, hitting both military and civilian targets.

Shelling caused widespread damage on Yeonpyeongdo. South Korea retaliated by shelling North Korean gun positions. In total, between four and 20 people (military personnel and civilians) were killed on both sides and approximately 40–55 people were wounded.

The North Koreans subsequently stated that they had fired in response to South Korean artillery firing into North Korean territorial waters.

The incident caused an escalation of tension on the Korean Peninsula and prompted widespread international condemnation of the North's actions. The United Nations declared it to be one of the most serious incidents since the end of the Korean War, and former US ambassador to the UN Bill Richardson said tensions had escalated to become "the most serious crisis on the Korean peninsula since the 1953 armistice, which ended the Korean War".

== Background ==
A western maritime line of military control between the two Koreas was established by United Nations Command (UNC) in 1953, called the Northern Limit Line (NLL). which is a maritime boundary that demarcates the territorial waters of South and North Korea in the West Sea. The boundary line extends from the Military Demarcation Line (MDL) into the sea, running between the mainland portion of Gyeonggi-do province, historically part of Hwanghae before 1945, and the adjacent offshore islands, including Yeonpyeongdo and Baengnyeongdo.

The UNC established the NLL in 1953 as a western maritime line of military control following the Korean War. However, its proximity to the North Korean mainland has resulted in prolonged tension and disputes over territory and fishing rights in the area. According to Time, "The North does not recognize the border that was unilaterally drawn by the United Nations at the close of the 1950–53 Korean War." Under the armistice, the United Nations designated five northwest islands to remain within its jurisdiction - Baengnyeongdo, Yeonpyeongdo, Daecheongdo, Socheongdo, and Udo. These islands strategically lie in the Yellow Sea just off the North Korean coast, causing disputes over their control and posing a persistent security threat to South Korea. The countries' western maritime boundary has long been a flash point between the two Koreas.

North Korea did not dispute or violate the line until 1973. The NLL was drawn up at a time when a three-nautical-mile territorial waters limit was the norm, but when in the 1970s a twelve nautical mile limit became internationally accepted, the implementation of the NLL prevented North Korea, in areas, from accessing, arguably actual or prospective, territorial waters. Later, after 1982, it also hindered North Korea establishing a United Nations Convention on the Law of the Sea Exclusive Economic Zone to control fishing in the area.

The disputed maritime border between North and South Korea in the West Sea: A: United Nations Command-created Northern Limit Line, 1953 B: North Korea-declared "Inter-Korean MDL", 1999 The locations of specific islands are reflected in the configuration of each maritime boundary, including: 1. Yeonpyeongdo; 2. Baengnyeongdo; 3. Daecheong Island

In 1999, North Korea drew up their own line, the "West Sea Military Demarcation Line" which claims a maritime boundary farther south that encompasses valuable fishing grounds (though it skirts around South Korean-held islands such as Yeonpyeongdo). This claim is not accepted by either South Korea or the United Nations Command.

The United Nations Command perspective remained unchanging, explaining that the NLL must be maintained until any new maritime military demarcation line could be established through the Joint Military Commission on the armistice agreement.

To assert its territorial claims North Korea has pursued a strategy of challenging South Korean control of the waters south of the NLL. It has made several incursions that have sparked clashes between the two sides, notably a naval battle near Yeonpyeongdo in 1999 and another engagement in the same area in 2002. Although there were no further serious clashes for a time, in 2009 increasing tensions along the disputed border led to a naval battle near the island of Daecheong, and accusations that a North Korean submarine had sunk the South Korean corvette Cheonan off Baengnyeongdo in March 2010. The NLL is not officially recognized by North Korea, and as a result, its fishing boats regularly operate close to or over the line, escorted by North Korean naval vessels. This has led to confrontations between North and South Korean navy ships, heightening tensions in the area.

Days before the incident, the North Korean government revealed their new uranium enrichment facility, prompting the South Korean government to consider requesting that the United States station tactical nuclear weapons in South Korea for the first time in 19 years. On the same day, South Korea and the United States began the annual Hoguk exercise, a large-scale military drill involving the South Korean and US militaries. The 2010 exercise involved 70,000 troops from all four branches of the South Korean military, equipped with 600 tracked vehicles, 90 helicopters, 50 warships, and 500 aircraft. The United States contributed its 31st Marine Expeditionary Unit and the Seventh Air Force to the land and sea elements of the exercise.

It had originally been intended that the United States Navy and Marine Corps would participate in a joint amphibious exercise in the Yellow (Western) Sea, west of South Korea. However, the US pulled out of the joint exercise citing "scheduling conflicts", though South Korean observers suggested that the real reason was the opposition of China, which regards a large portion of the Yellow Sea as its own territory. The North Korean government regards the exercises as preparation for a combined arms attack on the North.

== Engagement ==
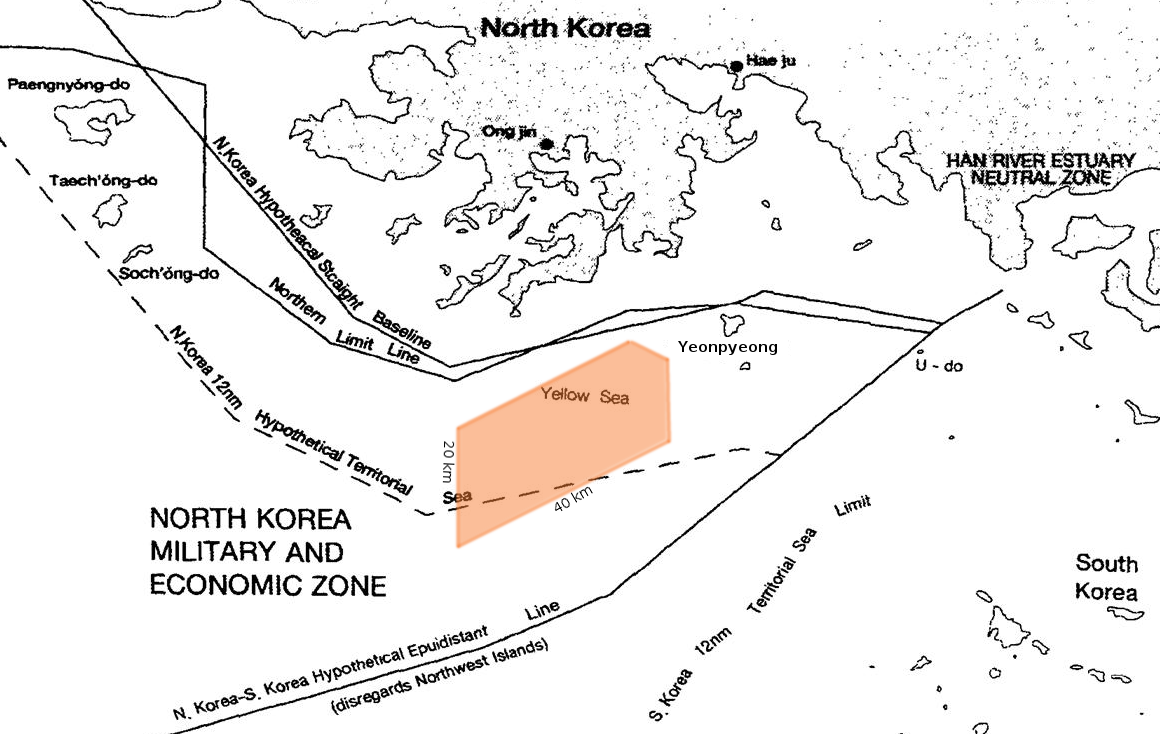
The South Korean 40 km by 20 km live-fire range in relation to the Northern Limit Line and the claimed North Korean 12 nautical mile territorial waters

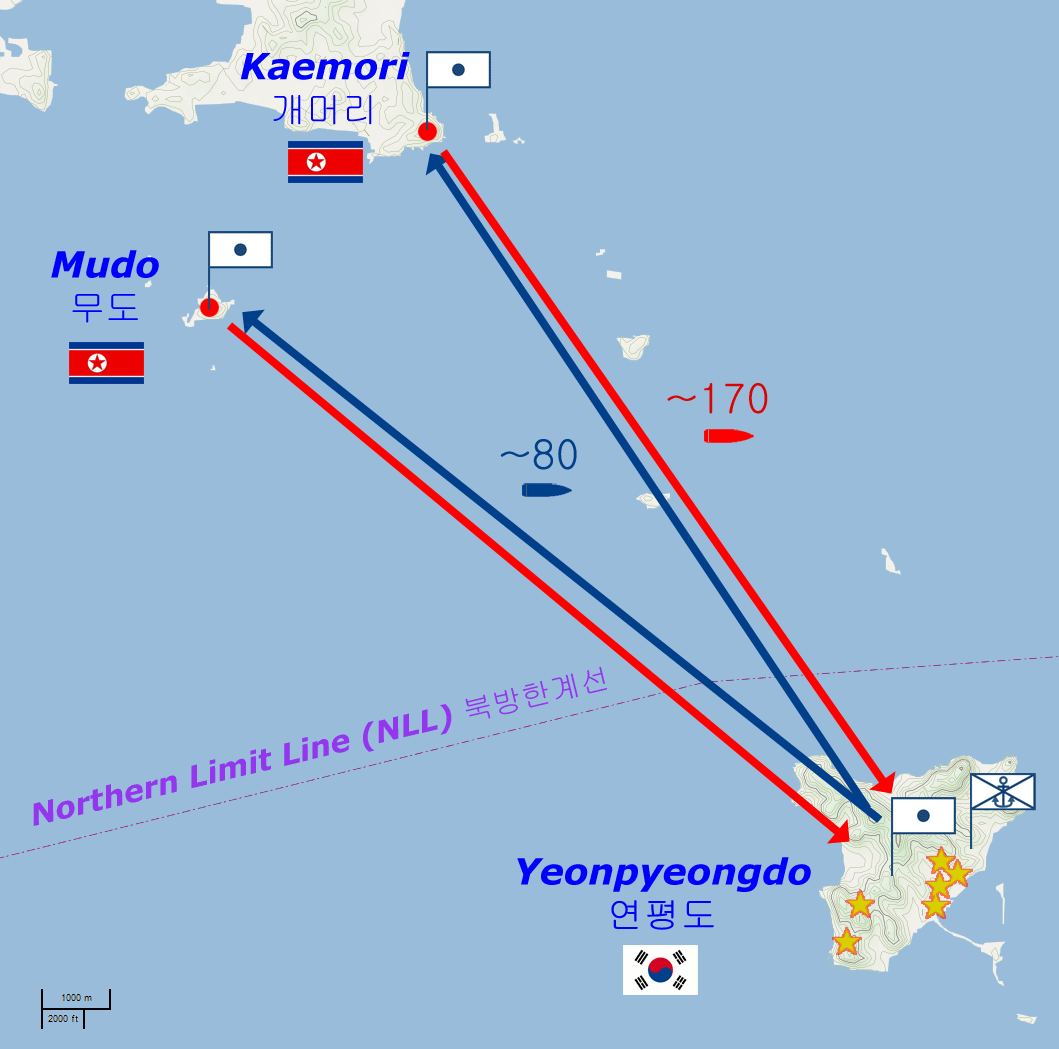
Map and graphic representation of the bombardment of Yeonpyeongdo

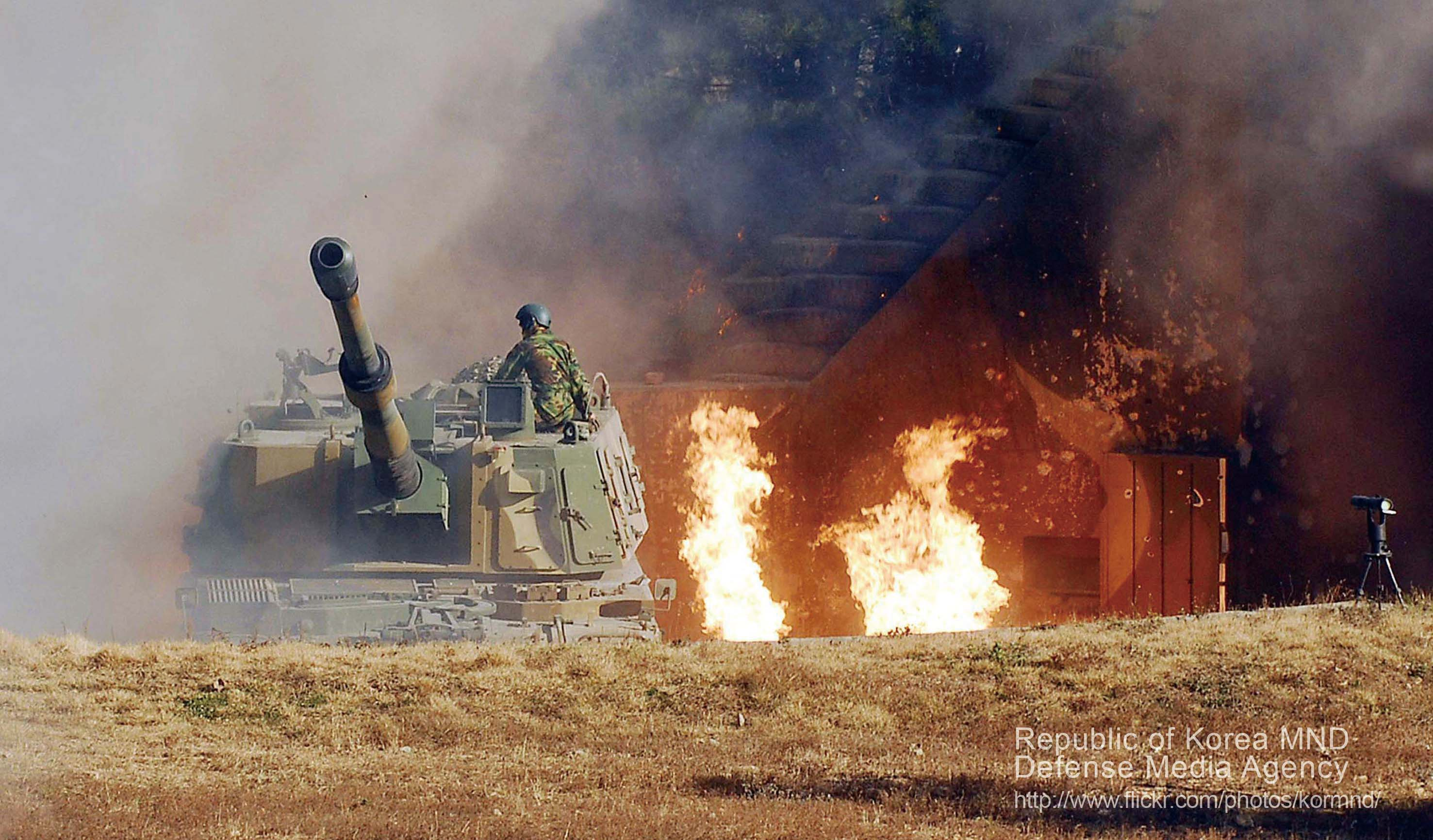
South Korean Marine Corps K9 self-propelled howitzer preparing to counterattack immediately after the initial attack from North Korea

On the morning of 23 November 2010, North Korea reportedly "wired a complaint [to the South] ... asking whether (the [Hoguk] exercise) was an attack against the North." It warned that it would not tolerate firing in what it regarded as its territorial waters. South Korean forces went ahead with a live-fire exercise in waters off Baengnyeongdo and Yeonpyeongdo within South Korean-held territory.

According to a South Korean military official, shells fired as part of the exercise were directed at waters in the south, away from North Korea. A Marine colonel on the island indicated the shells had been fired towards the southwest. South Korean Minister of National Defense, Kim Tae-young, said the firing was not part of the Hoguk exercise but a separate routine monthly drill carried out 4–5 km away from the NLL, contrary to previous media reports. The usual firing range is 40 kilometres (22 nmi) by 20 kilometres (11 nmi) in size and runs parallel to the NLL to the south-west of Yeonpyeongdo, largely within North Korea's 12 nautical miles (22 km) territorial waters claimed in 1955.

At 14:34 local time, North Korean coastal artillery batteries on Mudo, and a recently redeployed 122-mm MRL at Kaemori, in North Korea's South Hwanghae Province, opened fire on the island of Yeonpyeongdo. The bombardment took place in two waves, from 14:34 to 14:55 and again from 15:10 to 15:41. Many of the shells landed on a military camp, but others hit the island's principal settlement, destroying numerous homes and shops and starting fires. About 108 shells were fired in total according to a North Korean defector who had served in an artillery battery.

Three of the six K9 Thunder 155 mm guns stationed on Yeonpyong returned fire, while two were damaged and one blocked by a dud shell. South Korean artillery fired 80 shells in total. Initially, the South Koreans targeted barracks and command structures on Mudo, but began firing at the MRL at Kaemori about thirteen minutes later, due to the AN/TPQ-37 counter-battery radar not properly functioning, which meant the guns initially targeted general locations, such as the barracks.

South Korean KF-16 and F-15K jets were also scrambled to the area, though they did not engage targets as the North Korean artillery did not start a third barrage. South Korean counterstrikes ended at 16:42. It was the first artillery battle to take place between North and South Korea since the 1970s and was seen as one of the most serious attacks by the North on the South since the 1953 armistice.

With power on Yeonpyeongdo knocked out and several fires breaking out as a result of the North Korean shelling, the South Korean military ordered civilians to evacuate to bunkers.

=== Timeline ===
(All times in Korea Standard Time: UTC+9.)

08:20: North sends a telex message requesting a halt to the South's artillery training exercise.
10:00: South starts the artillery training exercise.
14:30: North deploys five MiG-23ML fighters from the 60th Regiment at Pukchang Airport; 122 mm MRL battalion near Kaemori conducts a short firing exercise.
14:34: North starts firing shells (around 150, of which about 60 land on military positions)
14:38: South conducts emergency sorties with two KF-16 fighters.
14:40: South deploys four F-15K fighters.
14:46: South conducts additional emergency sorties with two KF-16 fighters.
14:47: South fires back with the first round of K-9 howitzers (50 shells).
14:50: South issues a 'Jindogae Hana' (Jindo Dog 1) alert, the highest military alert given for a local provocation.
14:55: North stops firing temporarily.
15:12: North starts firing for the second time (20 shells, all of which landed on the island).
15:25: South resumes firing back with K-9 howitzers (30 shells).
15:30: South telexes the North's military general level talk representative requesting an immediate halt to artillery shelling.
15:40 – 16:00: The South's Joint Chiefs of Staff Han Min-gu and USFK Commander Walter L. Sharp have a video conference (a review of cooperative crisis management).
15:41: North stops firing.
16:30: First military casualty reported.
16:35 – 21:50: Foreign and National Security representatives have a meeting.
16:42: South stops firing.
18:40: Lee Hong-gi, the South's Joint Chief of Staff Director of Operations, holds a press briefing.
19:00: North Korea's Supreme Command of the Korean People's Army releases a statement labelled "Our Army is Making No Empty Talk" publicized through KCNA.
20:35 – 21:10: South Korean President Lee Myung-bak meets with his Joint Chief of Staff.

== Aftermath ==
=== Casualties and damage ===
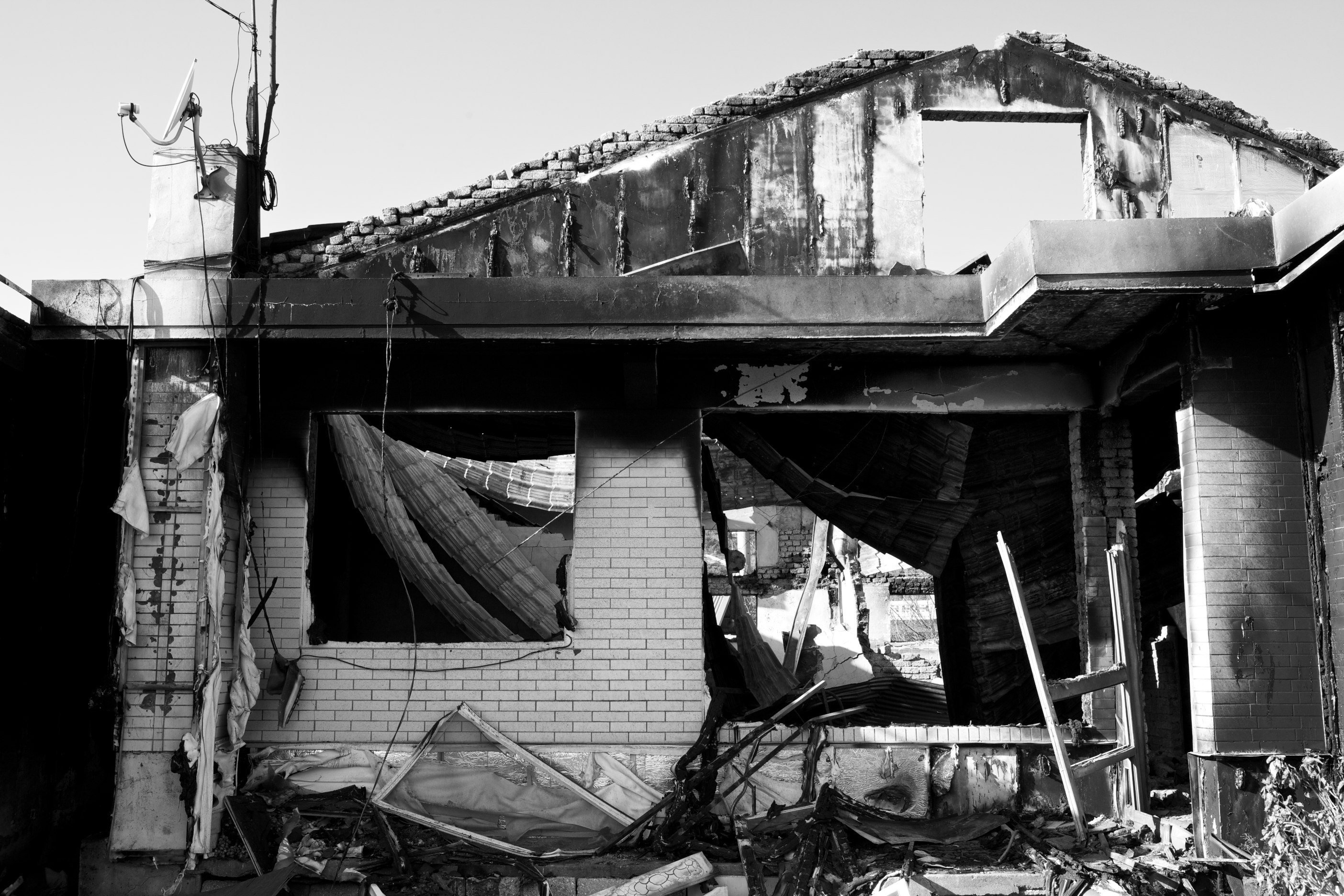
A building that was damaged by fire after the bombardment

The shelling caused a number of casualties among South Koreans living on Yeongpyeong. Two South Korean marines, Hasa (Staff Sergeant) Seo Jeong-wu and Ilbyeong (Lance Corporal) Moon Gwang-wuk, were killed. Six other military personnel were seriously wounded, and ten were treated for minor injuries. Two construction workers, Kim Chi-baek, 61, and Bae Bok-chul, 60, were killed.

Most islanders were evacuated in the aftermath of the shelling. Around 1,500 of the 1,780 residents on the island were taken aboard fishing boats and government vessels, many of them taken to Incheon on the mainland. The Incheon city authorities sent 22 fire engines and ambulances to the island, along with firefighters and paramedics, to help with the recovery and relief effort. 2,000 boxes of emergency relief materials and more than 3,500 relief kits and boxes of food were sent to help residents recover.

The attack started widespread fires on the island. According to the local county office, 70 percent of the island's forests and fields were burned and 21 houses and warehouses and eight public buildings were destroyed in the bombardment. Some of the public buildings were formerly military structures, leading the South Korean military to believe the attack was planned from old maps.

North Korea states that it suffered no military casualties. However, Lee Hong-gi, the Director of Operations of the South Korean Joint Chiefs of Staff (JCS), claimed that as a result of the South Korean retaliation "there may be a considerable number of North Korean casualties". A North Korean defector who had served in an artillery battery, however, stated that the South had likely failed to destroy the North Korean artillery batteries due to its slow response. South Korean media reported that 5–10 North Korean soldiers had been killed and 30 wounded, and the National Intelligence Service suggests damage to North Korean troops had been considerable during the South Korean counter-battery fire. Satellite images released by STRATFOR cast doubt on effectiveness of South Korean artillery and damage dealt to North as asserted by JCS and NIS, with no signs of any North Korean rocket launchers being destroyed. Similarly, despite targeting the barracks, there were little signs that the underground facilities suffered significant damage.

=== Political and financial impact ===
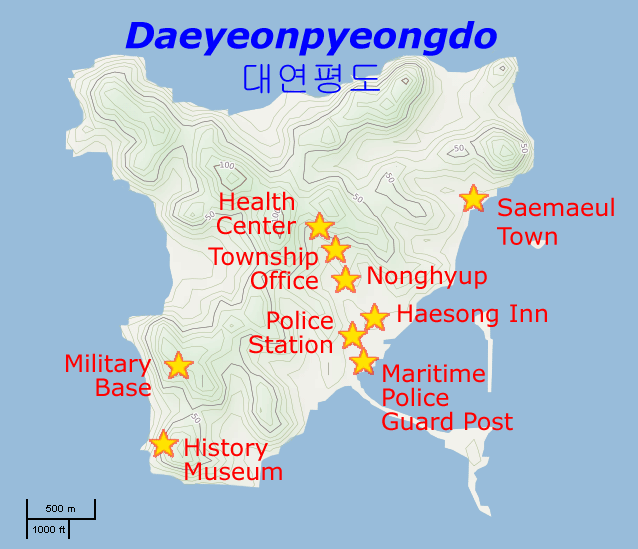
Locations hit by the North Korean shelling of Daeyeonpyeong.

The South Korean government called the attack a "clear armed provocation." It suspended interchanges with the North, cancelling inter-Korean Red Cross talks and banning visits to the jointly-operated Kaesong Industrial Region.

The main South Korean political parties condemned the North's attack. A spokesman for the ruling Grand National Party said: "It is impossible to hold our rage toward the North's shelling of the Yeonpyeongdo. North Korea must be held accountable for all the losses." The chairman of the opposition Democratic Party urged the North Koreans to "stop all provocation that threaten the peace and stability of the Korean Peninsula". He called for "the two Koreas to begin talks to prevent the situation from worsening" and urged the government to protect the peace and safety of South Koreans.

On 25 November, South Korea's defense minister, Kim Tae-young, announced his resignation after he was criticized for leading a response to the incident considered too passive by members of both the ruling and opposition political parties.

The North Korean news agency KCNA released a Korean People's Army communique stating that North Korea responded after the South had made a "reckless military provocation" by firing dozens of shells into North Korean territorial waters around Yeonpyeongdo from 13:00, as part of "war maneuvers". It warned that "should the South Korean puppet group dare intrude into the territorial waters of the DPRK even 0.001 mm, the revolutionary armed forces of the DPRK will unhesitatingly continue taking merciless military counter-actions against it." The South Korean Deputy Minister of Defense acknowledged that South Korean artillery units had been carrying out live-fire exercises, but denied that the shots had crossed into the North Korean sea area.

Four days after the shelling, North Korea's KCNA said about the death of civilians that, "[i]f that is true, it is very regrettable, [...] [b]ut the enemy should be held responsible for the incident as it took such inhuman action as creating 'a human shield' by deploying civilians around artillery positions and inside military facilities."

The North Korean attack had a global impact on the financial markets. Several Asian currencies weakened against the euro and U.S. dollar, while at the same time Asian stock markets declined. The impact of the shelling on the financial industry led South Korea's central bank, the Bank of Korea, to hold an emergency meeting to assess the impact of the fighting on the markets.

=== Military responses ===
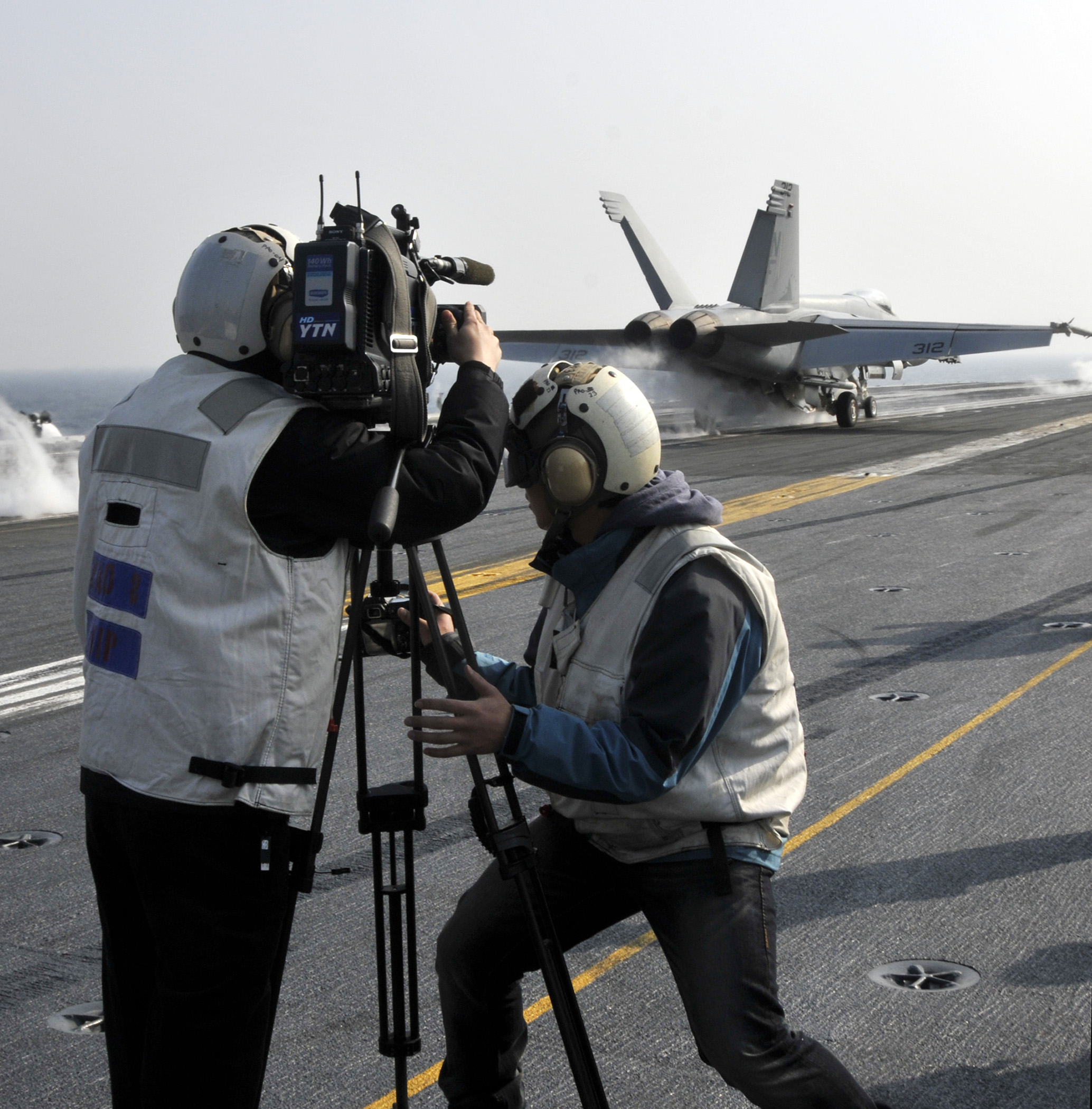
South Korean media on board the aircraft carrier George Washington observe a training mission, November 2010

President Lee instructed the South Korean military to strike North Korea's missile base near its coastal artillery positions if there were an indication of further provocation. Lee Hong-gi of the JCS told the media that the attack had been a "premeditated, intentional illegal violation of the U.N. Convention, the Armistice Agreement and the inter-Korean non-aggression accord. It is also an inhumane atrocity, in which [North Korea] indiscriminately fired shells into unarmed civilian residential areas." He said that the military had "strengthened our surveillance and monitoring to keep watch on North Korean military activities through close cooperation with the United States. We are closely cooperating to draw up joint response directions."

On 24 November, the US aircraft carrier USS George Washington departed for joint exercises in the Yellow Sea with the Republic of Korea Navy, in part to deter further North Korean military action but also to "send a message" to China.

On 28 November, South Korean news agency Yonhap News Agency said that North Korea had readied surface-to-surface missiles as the United States and South Korea began military drills.

On 21 December, South Korea carried out another live-fire artillery exercise into the same disputed waters just south of the NLL, despite diplomatic opposition from China and Russia.

One year after the event the South Korean military presence on the island had been substantially increased with the deployment of more K-9 howitzers, K-10 automatic ammunition re-supply vehicles, 130-millimeter, 36-round, truck-mounted Kooryong multiple rocket launchers and AH-1S Cobra attack helicopters. On 19 May 2013 the South Korean Joint Chiefs of Staff announced that "dozens" of Spike NLOS missiles had been deployed on Baengnyeongdo and Yeonpyeongdo.

=== Speculation on North Korean motives ===
North Korea's motives for the attack were the subject of widespread speculation in the South and elsewhere. The North Korean Foreign Ministry stated the North Korean bombardment was retaliation due to South Korea's shelling into sea that North Korea claims as its territorial waters. But some experts suggested that it was at least partly related to Kim Jong Un's appointment as successor to Kim Jong Il, which is believed to have caused tensions within the North Korean leadership. Robert Kelly, an assistant professor at Pusan National University in South Korea, says that Seoul's increasing global stature may have provoked Pyongyang. "My primary guess is that this is a response to the recent international prestige taken by South Korea at the G20. The G20 highlighted North Korean backwardness in the same way that it highlighted that South Korea was a partner of this global elite organization, setting international rules and the North Koreans don't like this", he said. It has also been suggested that the attack was linked to the North's need for food aid.

The JoongAng Ilbo newspaper suggested that the attack had been ordered by Kim Jong Il himself. Kim and his son were reported to have visited the Kaemori artillery base, whence many of the North Korean shells were fired, the day before. They had visited a nearby fish farm on 22 November, accompanied by various senior military figures. According to a source quoted by the newspaper, "Firing artillery across the Northern Limit Line at sea is difficult without a direct order from Pyongyang's highest authorities; firing inland would have been impossible without the will of Kim Jong Il."

=== Robert Gates's account of incident ===
In 2014, Robert Gates, who was United States Secretary of Defense during the incident, wrote in his memoirs that the South Korean government planned a "disproportionately aggressive" military retaliation "involving both aircraft and artillery". Gates said he, US President Barack Obama and Secretary of State Hillary Clinton had numerous telephone calls with South Korean counterparts to deescalate tension. Seoul declined to confirm Gates's version of events.

== International reactions ==
Images of the shelling were widely disseminated by media and across the internet. The sight of burning houses and plumes of smoke prompted international reaction.

- Argentina: The Argentine Foreign Ministry issued a statement in which Argentine Government expressed its "strong condemnation of the incident".
- Australia: Australian Prime Minister Julia Gillard condemned the attack and expressed concern over North Korean military provocations.
- Belgium: Deputy Prime Minister and Belgian Foreign Minister Steven Vanackere "roundly condemns the attack by North Korea," and "subscribes to the statement made by EU High Representative Catherine Ashton regarding the incident". Belgium furthermore "salutes the call for restraint by South Korean President Lee Myung Bak."
- Brazil: Brazilian President Luiz Inácio Lula da Silva stated that his current position was to "condemn any attempt of attack from North Korea to South Korea". According to him, "Brazil is against any attack to another country. We will not allow, in any circumstance, any attempt to violate another country's sovereignty".
- Bulgaria: The Bulgarian Ministry of Foreign Affairs condemned the attack and urged both North and South Korea to refrain from any further military provocations.
- Canada: Canadian Prime Minister Stephen Harper "strongly condemned" the attack, reaffirmed Canada's support for South Korea and urged North Korea to abide by the armistice and to not commit "further reckless and belligerent actions." Canadian Minister for Foreign Affairs Lawrence Cannon stated that he was "deeply concerned" about the events in Korea and that officials in his department were monitoring the situation. Documents indicate that the Canadian military may initiate strategic involvement in the event of a new conflict on the Korean Peninsula.
- Chile: The Chilean Ministry of Foreign Affairs condemned the attack and called on North Korea to set aside its "bellicose attitude".
- China: The Ministry of Foreign Affairs of PRC stated that the PRC Government urged both sides "to do things conducive to peace and stability in the Korean Peninsula," but did not explicitly condemn North Korea's actions.
- Colombia: The Colombian Ministry of Foreign Affairs condemned the attack of North Korea stating that the country "deplores the loss of human lives and the damages caused to the population and condemn the use of the force on behalf of the Korea Democratic People's Republic." Likewise, it spurred North Korea to "observe the orders of the Security Council of United Nations in it relative to the abstention of the threat and use of force".
- Costa Rica: The Ministry of Foreign Affairs and Culture expressed solidarity with South Korea "for the loss of life and violation of its sovereignty" and was concerned at the "great instability on the Korean Peninsula".
- Denmark: Danish Prime Minister Lars Løkke Rasmussen condemned the attack, and called it a "military provocation".
- European Union: EU High Representative Catherine Ashton condemned the attack and urged North Korea to respect the Korean Armistice Agreement.
- Finland: Finnish Minister for Foreign Affairs Alexander Stubb, while indicating that not enough information was available to "draw far-reaching conclusions", urged restraint and "added that every incident like this is a cause for concern."
- France: French President Nicolas Sarkozy expresses deep concern over the north–south dispute and urges it to be resolved politically.
- Germany: German Foreign Minister Guido Westerwelle assured South Korea of "our support and sympathy in this difficult time," while expressing worry that the "new military provocation threatens peace in the region". He urged all parties to "act in a cool-headed manner" and welcomed South Korean president Lee Myung-bak's efforts to "de-escalate the situation."
- Greece: Greek Foreign Ministry expressed concern and condemned "North Korea's aggressive attitude".
- Guatemala: The Government conveyed their "solidarity with South Korea" and was "concerned about the possibility of repercussions for peace and stability on the Korean Peninsula".
- Honduras: A statement by the Honduran Foreign Ministry condemned the "serious" armed attack by North Korea against Yeonpyeong and expressed solidarity with South Korea. It also called on both countries to seek a solution with respect to international law.
- Hungary: Hungarian State Secretary for Foreign Affairs Zsolt Németh condemned the North Korean attack against Yeonpyeong. He also said that it is yet unknown how serious the conflict is.
- India: The Indian External Ministry called for restraint, stability, and a resumption of negotiations, and expressed sympathy for the victims and injured people of Yeonpyeong.
- Indonesia: Indonesian Foreign Minister Marty Natalegawa expressed concern at the incident, calling on both sides to "immediately cease hostilities, exercise maximum restraint and avoid further escalation of tension".
- Israel: Israeli Foreign Minister Avigdor Lieberman said the incident was proof that the world "must stop the crazy regime" in North Korea.
- Japan: Japanese Prime Minister Naoto Kan "ordered his Government to prepare for any eventuality" during an emergency meeting. "Firing on an area where civilians live is an impermissible, atrocious act that we strongly condemn," Kan said. "It has created a grave situation in not only South Korea but the entire East Asia region, including Japan."
- Latvia: The Latvian Ministry of Foreign Affairs announced that Latvia urged both parties to "adhere to the Korean armistice agreement of 1953" and "condemns any actions that could lead to a further aggravation of the situation".
- Malaysia: Malaysian Foreign Minister Anifah Aman condemned the attack on Yeonpyeong which resulted in the loss of life. It called on all parties "to avoid resorting to action which can escalate the tension and generate instability" in the region.
- Mexico: The Mexican Ministry of Foreign Affairs condemned the attack and demanded the "immediate cessation of hostilities" by North Korea.
- New Zealand: New Zealand Foreign Minister Murray McCully condemned the incident, expressing "outrage over this attack and the consequent loss of life", but emphasised that "this is a time for cool heads in order to avoid this clash escalating into a more serious threat to the stability of the region".
- Norway: Norwegian Foreign Minister Jonas Gahr Støre stated that "the clashes and the raised tension in the border area between South and North Korea are alarming. An armed conflict would have very serious consequences. Both parties must now show restraint".
- Pakistan: The spokesman of Pakistan Foreign Minister Shah Mehmood Qureshi expressed concern in a press release and said that "Pakistan urges all concerned to exercise restraint and to resolve all issues peacefully".
- Peru: The Peruvian Foreign Ministry condemned the "despicable act of aggression" by North Korea and called for respect of the United Nations Charter.
- Philippines: Philippine President Benigno S. Aquino III's spokesman Edwin Lacierda said that "We are calling for an end to the provocative actions and calling for sobriety on the two Koreas. The Philippine embassy in Korea is taking precautionary measures to protect Filipino nationals there."
- Poland: Polish Foreign Ministry expressed "deep concern" over the incident and its potential to bring about a regional crisis, and hoped that "the two sides would avoid escalation".
- Romania: The Romanian Ministry of Foreign Affairs stated that it "is deeply concerned by the armed attack" adding that "We are unequivocally condemning such acts and we call upon the authorities in Pyongyang to put an end without delay to the provocative actions. At the same time, [...] we convey our condolences and heartfelt compassion to the families of the victims."
- Russia: The Russian Foreign Ministry stated that "the use of force is an unacceptable path [and that] [a]ny disputes in relations between the North and the South must be settled politically and diplomatically". Additionally, it urged both sides "to demonstrate restraint and peace," and warned of a "colossal danger" and "said those behind the attack carried a huge responsibility". Russian Foreign Minister Sergey Lavrov stated that "It is one thing to fire at the water even though these waters are disputed, quite another to fire at the land, at settlements. People died. This is the main point."
- Singapore: The Singaporean Ministry of Foreign Affairs condemned the incident, describing it as a "reckless and provocative action that dangerously heightened tensions in what was an already highly fraught and uncertain situation. [...] We urge both parties to exercise utmost restraint."
- Slovenia: Slovenian politician Jelko Kacin, who is part of the European delegation for relations with Korean Peninsula, condemned the "provocations from the North."
- Sweden: Swedish Foreign Minister Carl Bildt commented on his blog, calling the incident "very worrying" and for China to "use the full extent of its influence over Pyongyang to affect its regime".
- Taiwan: Ma Ying-jeou, President of the Republic of China accused North Korea of causing regional tension and asked his government to monitor the situation and to prepare for contingencies during the Kuomintang's 116th anniversary. Also, Timothy Yang, Foreign Minister of the Republic of China condemned the attack.
- United Arab Emirates: Foreign Minister Abdullah bin Zayed Al Nahyan described the attack as "irresponsible" and "affirmed the UAE's support for the government and people of South Korea".
- United Kingdom: British Foreign Secretary William Hague said in a statement that "The UK strongly condemns North Korea's unprovoked attack" and that it "strongly urge[s] North Korea to refrain from such attacks and adhere to the Korean Armistice agreement".
- United Nations: UN Secretary-General Ban Ki-moon's spokesman Martin Nesirky said that "Ban Ki-moon condemned North Korea's artillery attack, calling it 'One of the gravest incidents since the end of the Korean War.'" and that "Ban called for immediate restraint and insisted 'any differences should be resolved by peaceful means and dialogue'."
- United States: White House Office of the Press Secretary said that "The United States strongly condemns this attack and calls on North Korea to halt its belligerent action and to fully abide by the terms of the Armistice Agreement." The United States also deployed Carrier Strike Group Five, led by the George Washington, to the region to participate in previously scheduled training exercises with the Republic of Korea Armed Forces.
- Uruguay: The Uruguayan Ministry of Foreign Affairs condemned the attack and called on both parties "to refrain from the use of force and to channel the resolution of their differences by peaceful means." Vice President Danilo Astori and Foreign Minister Luis Almagro were both in Seoul for a state visit when the attack took place.
- Uzbekistan: Ministry of Foreign Affairs has expressed concerns about the situation, urging Pyongyang to refrain from taking unilateral measures aimed at further escalating tensions and resolve existing differences through peaceful diplomatic means.
- Vietnam: A spokeswoman for the Foreign Ministry said that the country was concerned at the incident and that "Vietnam opposes the use of force or threatening to use force in international relations and any military action that causes harm to innocent civilians".

== See also ==
- List of border incidents involving North and South Korea
- North Korea–South Korea relations
- Brinkmanship
