= Military demarcation line =

Land border between North and South Korea

- Hangul: 군사분계선; 휴전선
- Hanja: 軍事分界線; 休戰線
- RR: Gunsa bungyeseon; Hyujeonseon
- MR: Kunsa pun'gyesŏn; Hyujŏnsŏn

The Military Demarcation Line within the Korean Demilitarized Zone.

The military demarcation line (MDL), sometimes referred to as the armistice line, is the effective land border or demarcation line between North Korea and South Korea. On either side of the line is the Korean Demilitarized Zone (DMZ). The MDL and DMZ were established by the Korean Armistice Agreement.

In the Yellow Sea, the two Koreas are divided by a de facto maritime "military demarcation line" and maritime boundary called the Northern Limit Line (NLL) drawn by the United Nations Command (UNC) in 1953. The NLL is not described by the Korean Armistice Agreement.

== Demarcation on land ==
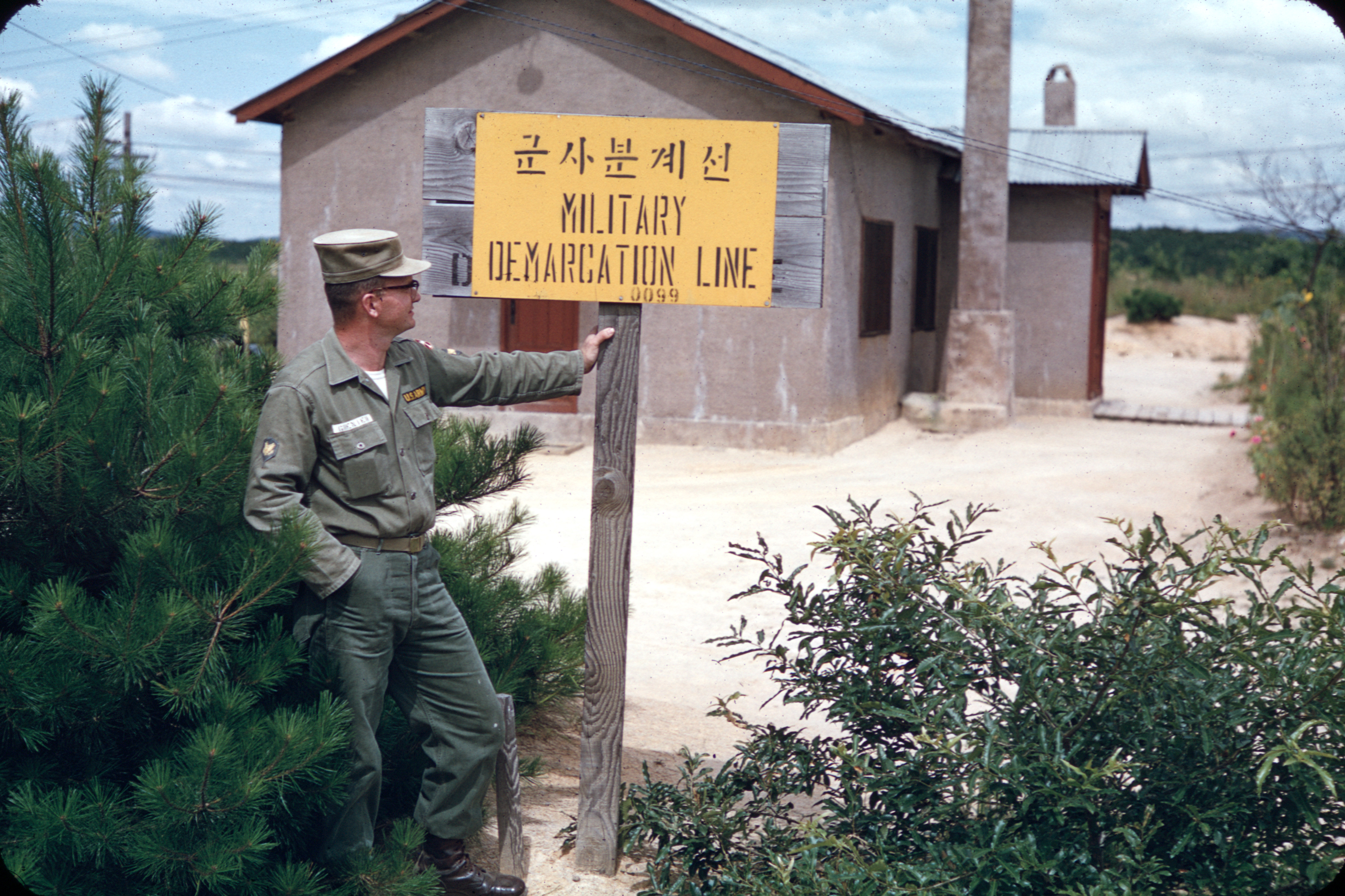
MDL sign in Joint Security Area, 1956.

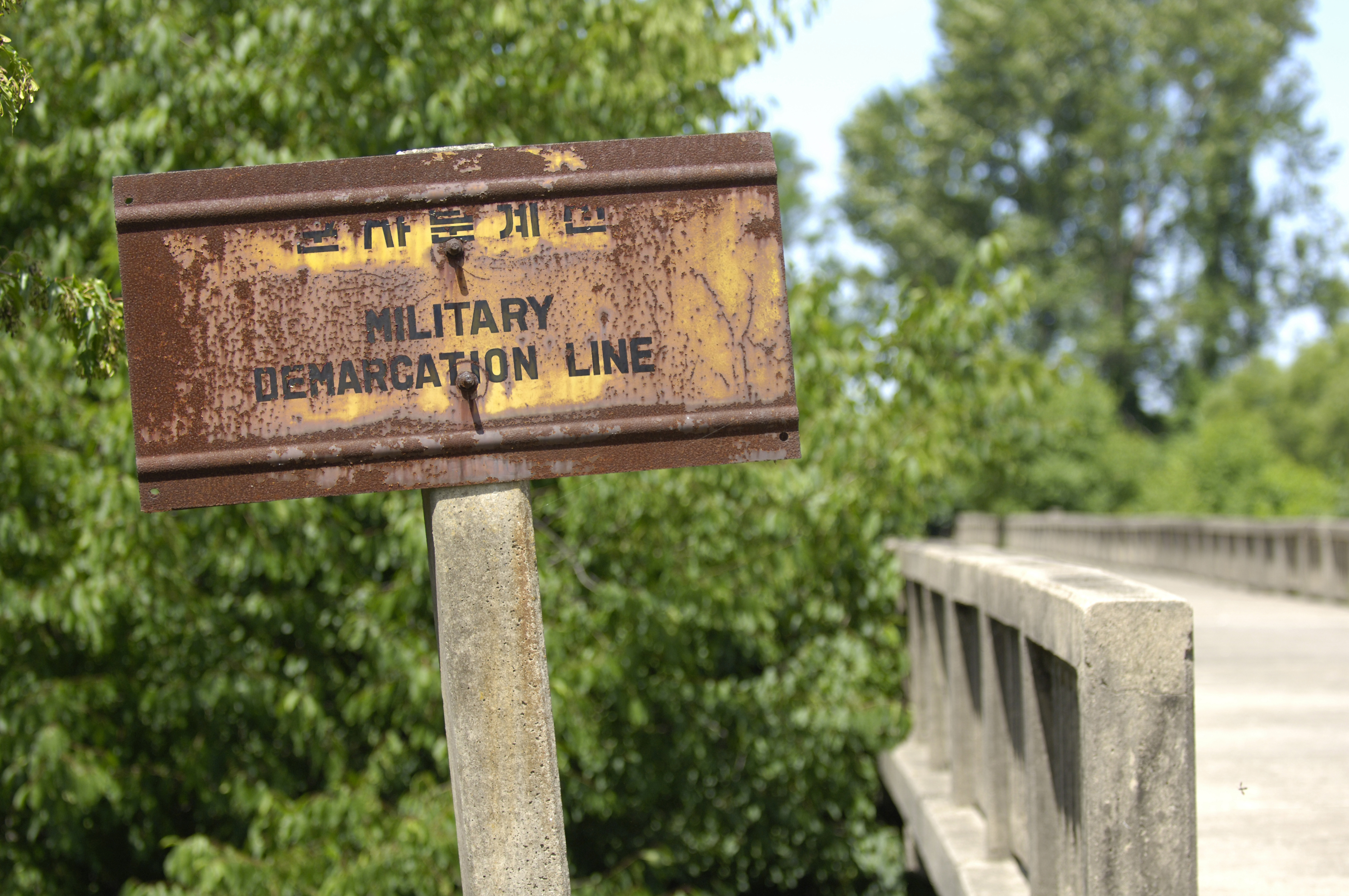
Bridge MDL sign.

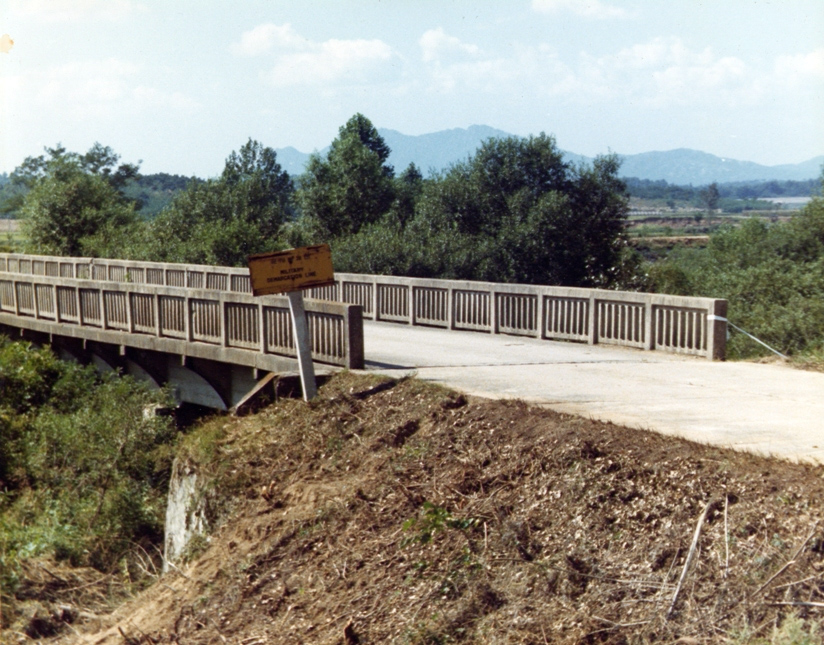
Bridge MDL sign in context.

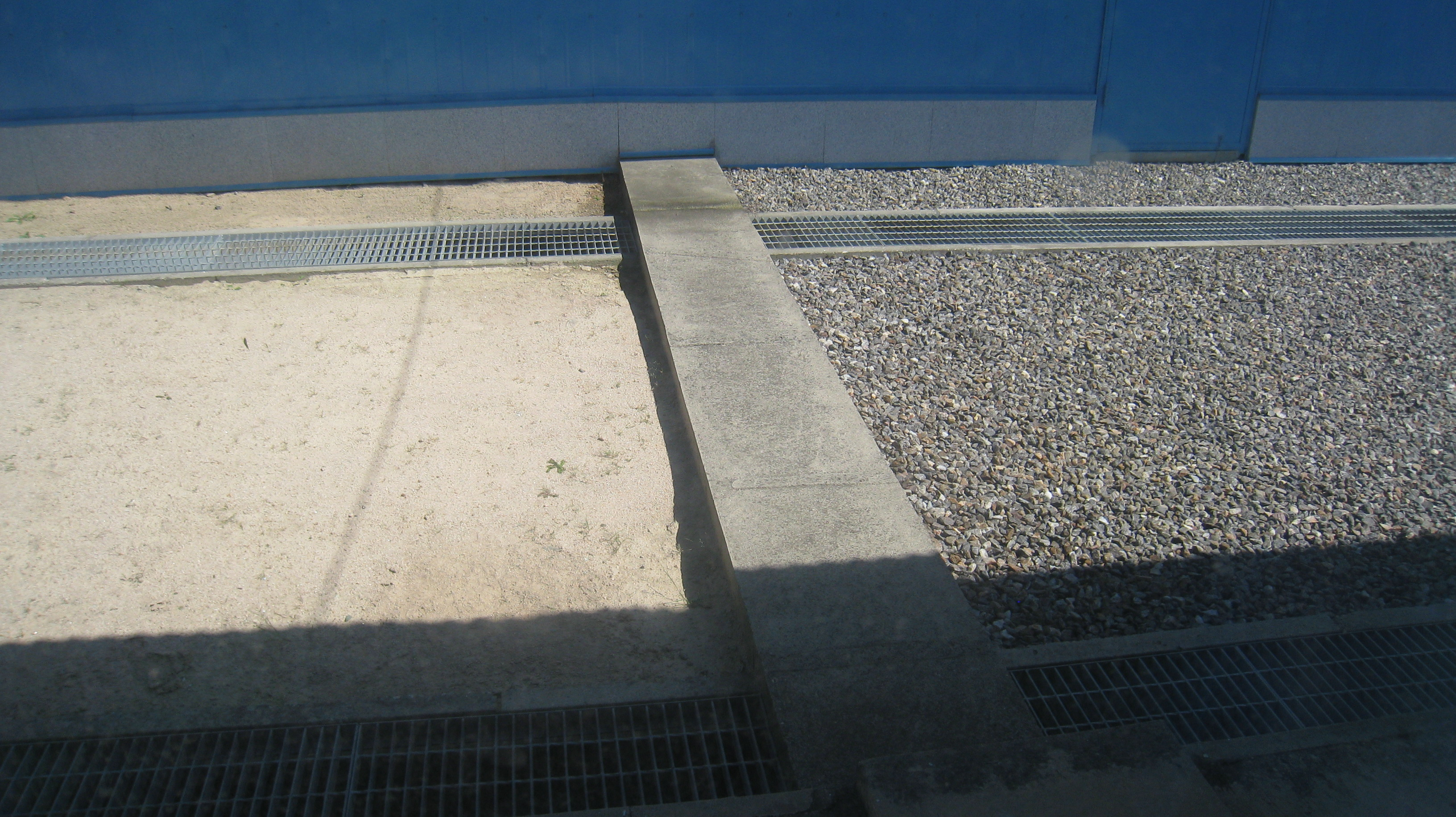
The MDL between the North (left) and South (right), marked by a concrete slab between the conference buildings on JSA.

The DMZ runs near the 38th parallel, covering roughly 248 kilometers (154 mi). American and South Korean soldiers patrol this line along the South Korean side while North Korean soldiers patrol along the North Korean side.

In Korean, the line is called the Hyujeonseon (휴전선), meaning "armistice line". It is also sometimes called the Gunsa Bungye-seon (군사분계선), which literally means "military demarcation line". However, in colloquial usage, the dividing line is more often called the Sampalseon (삼팔선, "3–8 Line") after the 38th parallel, a name likely coined at the end of World War II, when it would have been an accurate description of the North-South border.

The line itself is marked off by a series of 1,292 identical signs which are placed at intervals across the peninsula. The north facing side of the signs are written in Korean and Chinese, and in Korean and English on the south facing side. The signs are now aging and rusting.

=== Military incidents ===
There have been frequent skirmishes along the line since the armistice ended the fighting of the Korean War.

== Northern Limit Line ==
The disputed maritime border between North and South Korea in the West Sea: A: United Nations Command-created Northern Limit Line, 1953 B: North Korea-declared "Inter-Korean MDL", 1999 The locations of specific islands are reflected in the configuration of each maritime boundary, including: 1. Yeonpyeong Island; 2. Baengnyeong Island; 3. Daecheong Island

Although the Korean Armistice Agreement specifies where the demarcation line and demilitarized zone are located on land, the agreement does not mention lines or zones in adjacent ocean waters. Shortly after the signing of the Armistice, a line in the sea was drawn unilaterally by the United Nations Command. This Northern Limit Line or North Limit Line (NLL) represented the northern limit of the area in which South Korea permits its vessels to navigate, not a demarcation line on which the two Koreas agreed. The Korean Armistice Agreement (KAA) provisions regarding the MDL and DMZ do not extend into the Yellow Sea or Sea of Japan.

In 1999, North Korea unilaterally asserted its own "North Korean Military Demarcation Line in the West Sea (Yellow Sea)", also called the "Inter-Korean MDL in the Yellow Sea".

Nonetheless, the UNC-drawn line functions as a de facto or "practical" extension of the 1953 MDL, despite occasional incursions and clashes.

== Joint Security Area crossing ==
On October 16, 2018. the governments of North and South Korea agreed to allow locals and tourists to cross the Military Demarcation Line's infamous Joint Security Area location once it is cleared of personnel. The crossings will resemble the brief moment South Korean President Moon Jae-in stepped into North Korea with North Korean Chairman Kim Jong-un on April 27, 2018. After the Joint Security Area was cleared of armed military personnel on October 25, 2018, it was announced that tourism at the MDL crossing would be delayed.

== Establishment of buffer zones, no-fly zones and Yellow Sea peace zones ==
On November 1, 2018, officials from the South Korean Ministry of Defense confirmed that buffer zones were established across the DMZ by the North and South Korean militaries to ensure that both militaries would keep their distance from the Military Demarcation Line (MDL). In compliance with the Comprehensive Military Agreement which was signed at the September 2018 inter-Korean summit, the buffer zones help ensure that both Koreas will ban hostility on land, air and sea. The buffer zones stretch from the north of Deokjeok Island to the south of Cho Island in the West Sea and the north of Sokcho city and south of Tongchon County in the East (Yellow) Sea. Both North and South Korea are prohibited from conducting live-fire artillery drills and regiment-level field maneuvering exercises or those by bigger units within 5 kilometers of the MDL.

No-fly zones have also been established along the DMZ to ban the operation of drones, helicopters and other aircraft over an area up to 40 kilometers away from the MDL. For UAVs, the no-fly zone is 15 kilometers from the MDL in the East and 10 km from the MDL in the West. For hot-air balloons, the zone is within 25 kilometers from the MDL. For fixed-wing aircraft, no fly zones are designated within 40 kilometers from the MDL in the East (between MDL Markers No. 0646 and 1292) and within 20 km of the MDL in the West (between MDL Markers No. 0001 and 0646). For rotary-wing aircraft, the no fly zones are designated within 10 kilometers of the MDL.

Both Koreas also established "peace zones" in the area of the Yellow Sea which borders the MDL as well.

== Reconnecting of MDL-crossing road ==
On November 22, 2018, North and South Korea completed construction to connect a three kilometer road along the DMZ. The road, which travels across the MDL, has 1.7 km in South Korea and 1.3 km in North Korea. The road was reconnected for the first time in 14 years in an effort to assist with a process at the DMZ's Arrowhead Hill involving the removal of landmines and exhumation of Korean War remains.

== Inter-Korean transportation services ==
On November 30, 2018, following the removal of the "frontline" guard posts and Arrowhead Hill landmines, rail transportation between North and South Korea (which ceased in November 2008) resumed when a South Korean train crossed the MDL into North Korea. On December 8, 2018, a South Korean bus crossed the MDL into North Korea.

== Military border crossing ==
On December 12, 2018, militaries from both Koreas crossed the MDL into the opposition countries for the first time in history to verify the removal of "frontline" guard posts.

On June 5, 2024, South Korea's military announced that it would resume all military activity on the MDL after the suspension of an inter-Korean military agreement.

== See also ==
- Division of Korea
- Panmunjom
- Camp Bonifas
- Aftermath of the Korean War
- Inner German border
- Demarcation line between occupied France and Vichy France
