= Five West Sea Islands =

Five South Korean islands

Coordinates: 37.69012°N 126.32841°E

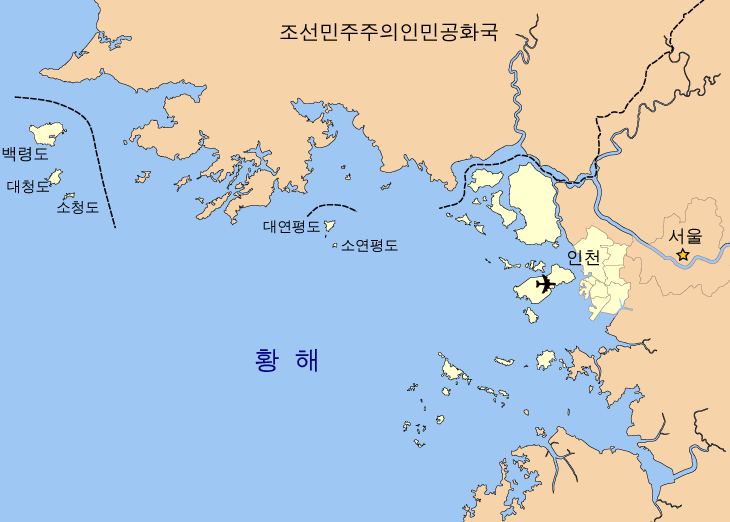
Locations of Five West Sea Islands (in Korean)

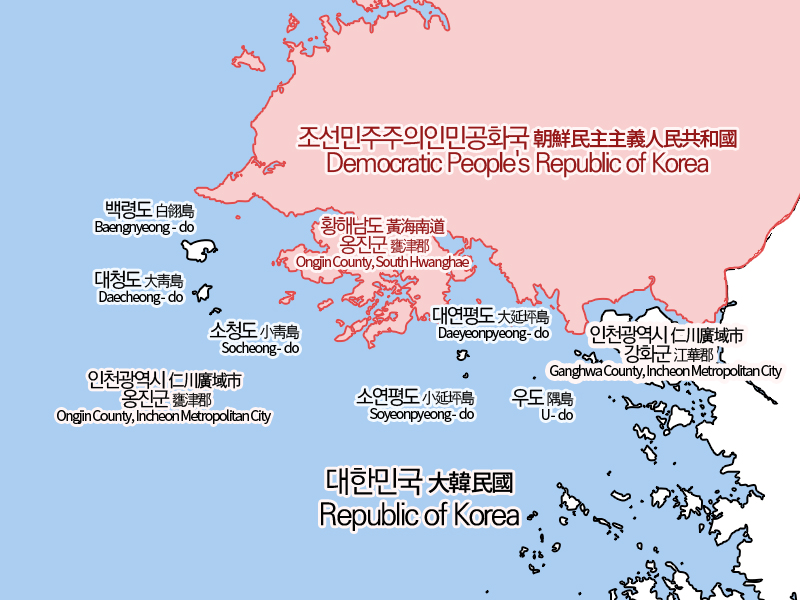
Locations of Five West Sea Islands (in Korean and English)

The Five West Sea Islands (also called the Five Islands of the West Sea or the Northwest Islands) (Korean: 서해오도; Hanja: 西海五島) refers to the five islands in the West Sea (Yellow Sea) administered by Incheon, South Korea. They are Yeonpyeongdo, Baengnyeongdo, Daecheongdo, Socheongdo and Soyeonpyeongdo. Their positions are much closer to North Korea as these islands are originally part of Hwanghae Province and their sovereignties are claimed by North Korea, but they are controlled by South Korea since the United Nations forces established the Northern Limit Line (NLL) north of the islands in 1953 following the Korean War.

The only way to reach any of the five islands is by ferry. Three round trips are made every day from Incheon Harbor to Baengnyeongdo, with stops at Socheongdo and Daecheongdo. Baengnyeongdo is about 200 kilometers (about 124.27 mi) by boat from Incheon, making it the farthest island in the archipelago. A one-way trip takes about four hours. Baengnyeongdo is only 16 kilometers (about 9.94 mi) from Cape Changsan in North Korea, and Yeonpyeongdo is only 10 kilometers (about 6.21 mi) from the North Korean port of Pupori, making the islands much closer to North Korea.

== North Korea and the Five West Sea Islands ==
=== The Northern Limit Line ===
The Northern Limit Line (NLL) was established by the United Nations Command (UNC) on August 30, 1953, following the end of the Korean War. The line stood unopposed until 1973, when North Korean representatives made a claim of 12 nautical miles for their territorial waters, placing the Five West Sea Islands in North Korean territory. North Korea continued to object to the NLL, and declared its own maritime border in 1999, called the "West Sea Maritime Military Demarcation Line," which just barely excludes the islands.

=== Military clashes ===
The islands are in the middle of the maritime border between North and South Korea. Many of the major military clashes since the Korean War have occurred around these islands. On February 15, 1974, the North Korean navy sank a South Korean fishing boat, killing 13 people and capturing the lone survivor. During the same incident, they also captured another fishing boat with a crew of 14 people. On March 26, 2010, the Republic of Korea Navy ship ROKS Cheonan was sunk near Baengnyeongdo, killing 46 crew members. An international investigation blamed a North Korean torpedo for sinking the ship. On November 23, 2010, North Korea fired around 170 artillery shells and rockets at Yeonpyeongdo, killing four South Koreans and wounding 19 others. North Korea accused South Korea of firing artillery shells into its territorial waters while conducting military exercises. This was the first deliberate attack by North Korean on South Korean civilians since the Korean War. Because of this, there are approximately 40 civilian bomb shelters on the islands.

The islands are considered a nuisance for North Korea, as the southernmost military outpost of North Korea, Haeju, can be seen with the naked eye from Yeonpyeongdo, and the movement of North Korean ships can easily be tracked from the islands. Despite the military conflicts, the North and South have achieved better relations over the islands in recent years. The 2018 Panmunjom Declaration for Peace, Prosperity and Reunification, adopted by the leaders of North and South Korea, expanded permissible fishing areas and allowed nighttime fishing around the islands for the first time in 55 years.

== Religion ==
There are a curious number of churches and cathedrals on the Five Islands of the West Sea. Baengnyeongdo alone has 13 churches for a population of approximately 5,700. Approximately 75% of the population are religious, compared to only 64% of mainland South Korea. Baengnyeongdo was also part of the West Sea missionary route created by the first Catholic priest from Korea, Kim Taegon.
