= Ongjin County, Incheon =

Coordinates: 37°12′50″N 126°10′42″E

Ongjin
- County
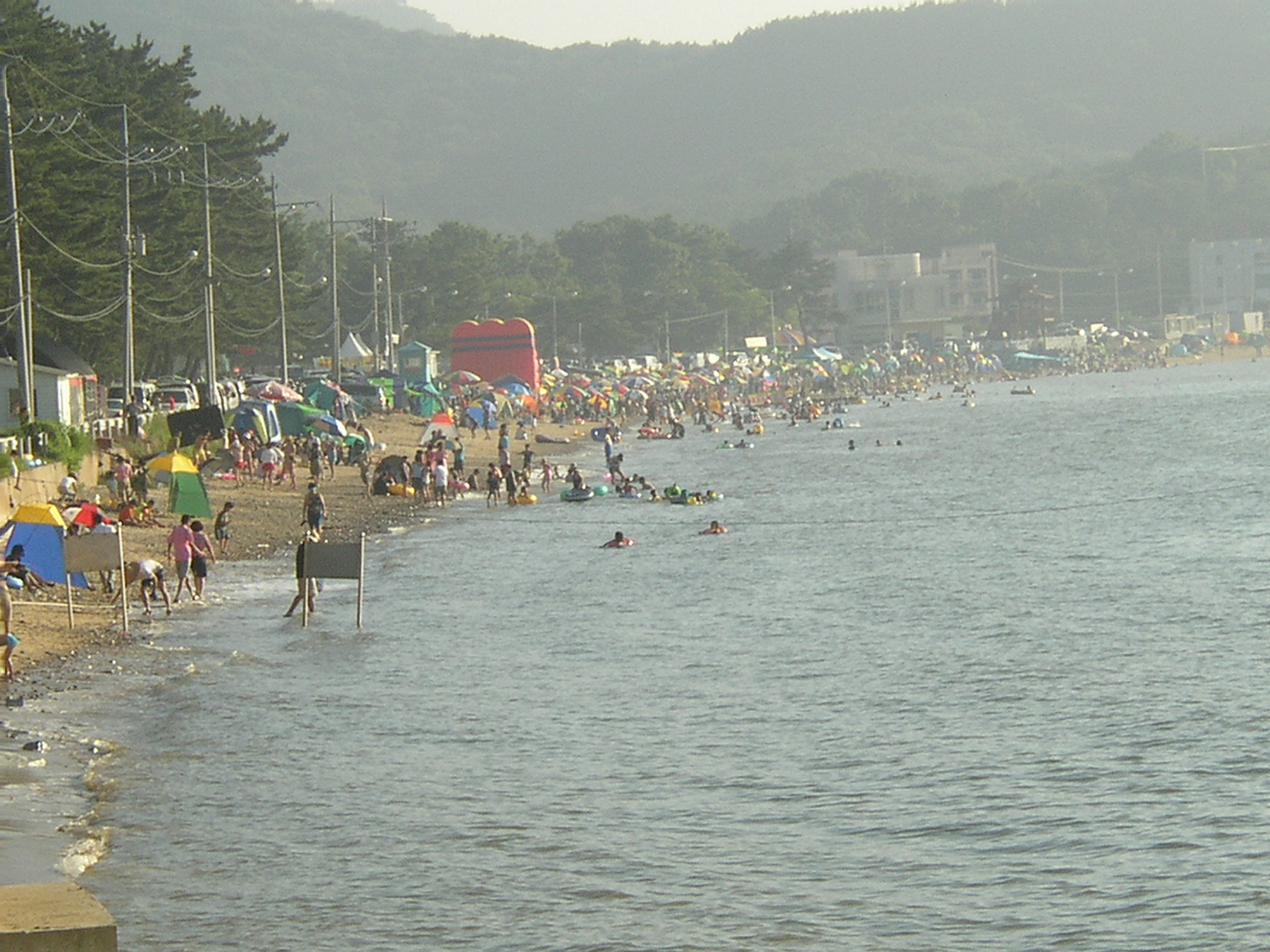
- Janggyeong Beach on Yeongheung Island

- Flag

- Divisions of Ongjin are numbered
- Country: South Korea
- Region: Sudogwon
- Provincial level: Incheon
- Administrative divisions: 7 myeon

Area
  - Total: 172.48 km^{2} (66.59 sq mi)

Population (2020)
  - Total: 20,456
  - Density: 118.60/km^{2} (307.17/sq mi)
  - Dialect: Seoul
- Website: Ongjin County Office

Korean name
- Hangul: 옹진군
- Hanja: 甕津郡
- RR: Ongjin-gun
- MR: Ongjin-gun

Islanders of the Sir James Hall Group, engraving c. 1817

Ongjin County (Korean: 옹진군) is a county in Incheon Metropolitan City, South Korea. It consists of a group of islands in the Yellow Sea (West Sea).

Four of the islands, Yeonpyeong Island, Baengnyeong, Daecheong, and Socheong Islands, are very near the Northern Limit Line. They are close to the Ongjin Peninsula of South Hwanghae Province in North Korea, at a considerable distance from the nearest part of the South Korean mainland. These islands are popular destinations for tourism. In historical contexts these three islands and their smaller neighbors are sometimes known as the Sir James Hall Group after Sir James Hall, whose son Basil Hall was an early Western visitor to Korea.

== History ==
Although no remains from the Paleolithic Age have been excavated, the distribution of remains from the Neolithic Age in the islands of the Yellow Sea suggests that people lived in Ongjin from early times.

Historical records indicate that one of the earliest tribal states in Korea, known as Jinbeon, was located in the Hwanghae region.

When Gojoseon was conquered, and the Four Commanderies of Han were established, Zhenfan Commandery was established in this area. After Zhenfan Commandery was abolished, it was subordinated to Lelang Commandery and Daifang Commandery and then came into Goguryeo's territory. During the Goguryeo period, Ongjin was called Ongcheon (甕遷), and today's Gangnyeong (康翎) was called Bujini (付珍伊), and Baengnyeongdo was called Gokdo (鵠島).

After Silla unified the three kingdoms, it became part of Bokjigun (瀑池郡) in 757 (16th year of King Gyeongdeok's reign).

It was bestowed with the name in use today – Ongjin – during the reign of King Taejo of Goryeo, the founder of the Goryeo dynasty. Then in 1018, during the ninth year of King Hyeonjong's reign over Goryeo, the county was established as one of the major administrative divisions in the kingdom's heartland.

In 1945, when Soviet Civil Administration and United States Army Military Government in Korea split Korea, Ongjin County was put under the United States Army Military Government in Korea's administration, with the county controlling the Ongjin peninsula, and the Ongjn County was put under the jurisdiction of Gyeonggi Province.

With the Korean Armistice Agreement in 1953, the mainland Ongjin Peninsula was put under North Korean Ongjin County, and Ongjin County of South Korea retained its jurisdiction over the Five West Sea Islands.

On March 1, 1995, Ongjin County was incorporated into Incheon Metropolitan City.

== Religion ==
Christianity makes up 49.6% of the population split between 32.3% Protestant and 17.3% Catholic. Meanwhile No Religion makes 48.5% of the population. Buddhism represents 1.9% of the populations.

== Administration ==
Administrative divisions

The Ongjin County seat is located outside of the county itself, in Michuhol District. There is also an Ongjin County in South Hwanghae Province, North Korea. This chain of islands was originally a part of South Hwanghae province before the Partition of Korea in 1948.

=== Administrative divisions ===
Ongjin County is divided into seven townships (myeon).

- Bukdo-myeon (북도면), which includes Sindo, Sido, and Modo
- Yeonpyeong-myeon (연평면), on Yeonpyeong Island
- Baengnyeong-myeon (백령면), on Baengnyeong Island
- Daecheong-myeon (대청면), on Daecheong Island and Socheong Island
- Deokjeok-myeon (덕적면), which includes Deokjeokdo
- Jawol-myeon (자월면), which includes Seongapdo.
- Yeongheung-myeon (영흥면)

== Tourism ==
It is difficult to reach Ongjin County because of its proximity to North Korea and its distance from South Korean areas.

The coast and islands feature many gravel beaches, some of which (such as Guridong beach and Gulubdo beach) feature fantastic eroded stone outcroppings. There are also large mudflats, which are a popular tourist destination.

== Interesting facts ==
The survivalist television series Squid Game created by Hwang Dong-hyuk for Netflix was filmed on Seongapdo island (part of Jawol-myeon) in 2020–2021.

== See also ==
- Geography of South Korea
