= Ongjin County =

Ongjin County may refer to:

- Ongjin County, Incheon, South Korea
- Ongjin County, South Hwanghae, North Korea
