= Socheongdo =

Island in Incheon, South Korea

- Interactive map of Socheongdo

Geography
- Coordinates: 37°46′2″N 124°44′42″E

Korean name
- Hangul: 소청도
- Hanja: 小青島
- RR: Socheongdo
- MR: Soch'ŏngdo

Socheongdo (Korean: 소청도; lit. 'small blue island') or Socheong Island is a small island in Ongjin County, Incheon, South Korea. It is part of Daecheong myeon, centred on the larger Daecheongdo to its north; both islands are near the Northern Limit Line between North and South Korea. It is situated in the Yellow Sea, lying 200 km northwest of Incheon, 40 km southwest of the mainland of South Hwanghae, North Korea, and 200 km northeast of Shandong Peninsula, China.

In 2010, it had a population of 280, with 163 males and 117 females. Most of its residents work in fishing. It has an elementary school. The island is accessible via a ferry system that goes between Incheon and some of its islands.
