= Baengnyeongdo =

Island of South Korea

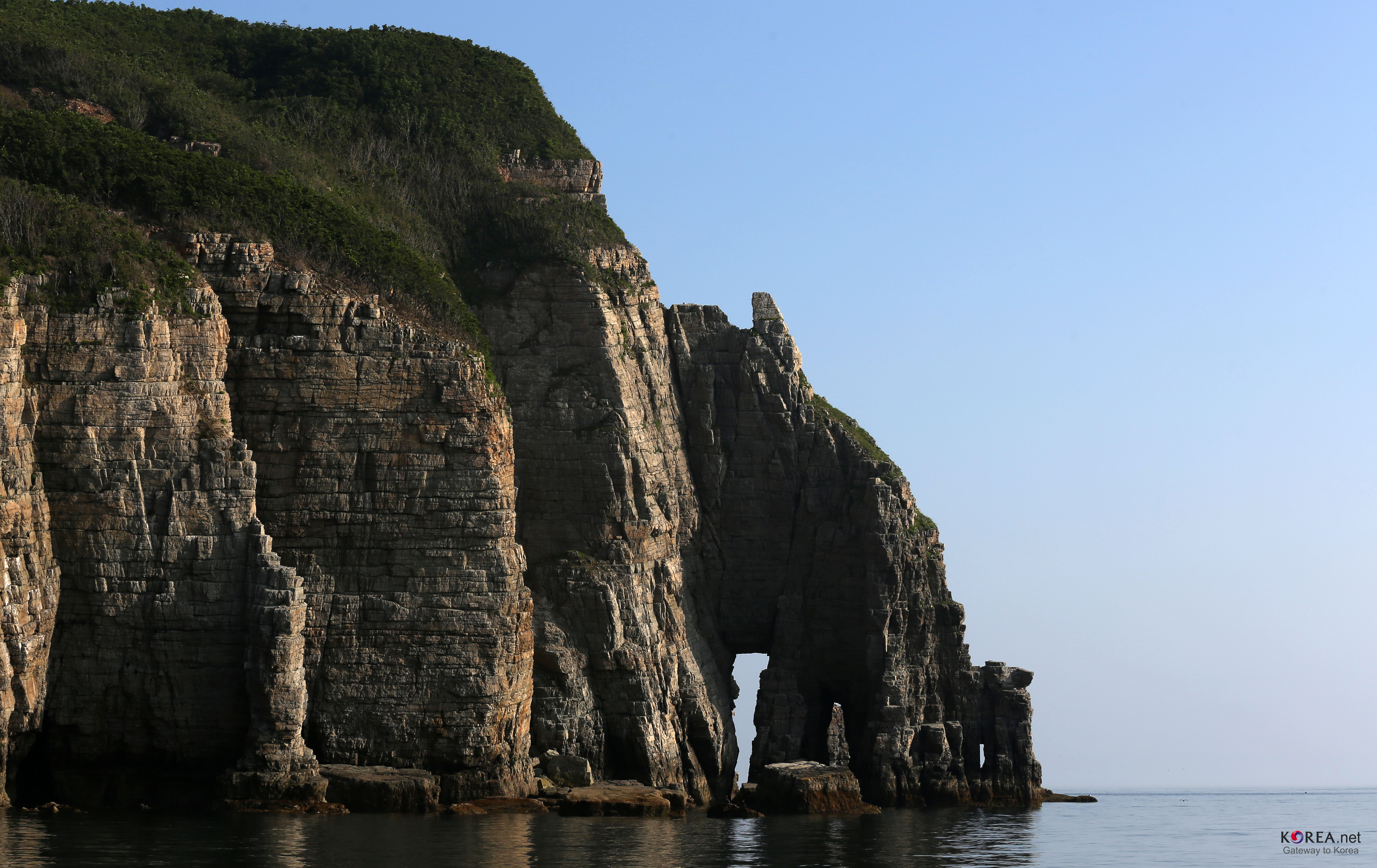
- Part of the island (2013)
- Interactive map of Baengnyeongdo

Geography
- Location: Ongjin County, Incheon, South Korea
- Coordinates: 37°58′N 124°39′E

Demographics
- Population: 4329

Korean name
- Hangul: 백령도
- Hanja: 白翎島
- RR: Baengnyeongdo
- MR: Paengnyŏngdo

Baengnyeongdo (Korean: 백령도; Korean pronunciation: [pɛŋnjʌŋdo]), sometimes Baekryeong Island, is an island in Ongjin County, Incheon, South Korea. It is an inhabited island located near the Northern Limit Line, and is closer to North Korea than it is to the South Korean mainland.

Since the 1945 division of Korea, the island has remained under South Korean control. This was affirmed by the 1953 Korean Armistice Agreement which ended the Korean War. Since then, the island has hosted both North Korean defectors and skirmishes between the two countries.

The island is now a popular tourist destination, and is known for its scenic cliffs and beaches. It has three Natural Monuments of South Korea.

== Toponymy ==
The island's name means "white wing island".

There is an origin legend surrounding the name. A man and a woman lived in a village in the nearby Hwanghae Province. The two fell in love, but when the woman's father found out about the romance, she was exiled to Baengnyeongdo. Distressed, the man attempted in vain to locate her. One day, the man dreamed that a white crane gave him a piece of paper. The man then awoke to find that he actually did have a paper with the woman's address on it. He then set out to the island, whereupon he found her at the address. The two then lived happily ever after. The island was then dubbed Baekakdo (백학도; lit. 'white crane island'); the name eventually became Baengnyeongdo.

== Description ==
The island is a popular tourist attraction, and has three Natural Monuments of South Korea.

Dumujin Coast is a quartzite cliff about 50 m (160 ft) tall, off the coast of the island. It was carved by erosion from the waves, wind, and rain. The site has long been considered beautiful and scenic, with a 1612 record describing it as seeming like it was carved by the gods.

The beach at Sagot Cape is a sandy beach on the island that is 4 km (2.5 miles) long. At low tide, the exposed surface is considered to have such fine-grained sand with sufficient firmness to serve as a natural runway.

Kongdol Beach is a beach with round, smooth multi-colored pebbles. The pebbles are said to resemble beans (the beach's name literally means "bean rock"), and are made of quartzite. They are likely fragments of the nearby quartzite cliffs that have been rounded by erosion over time.

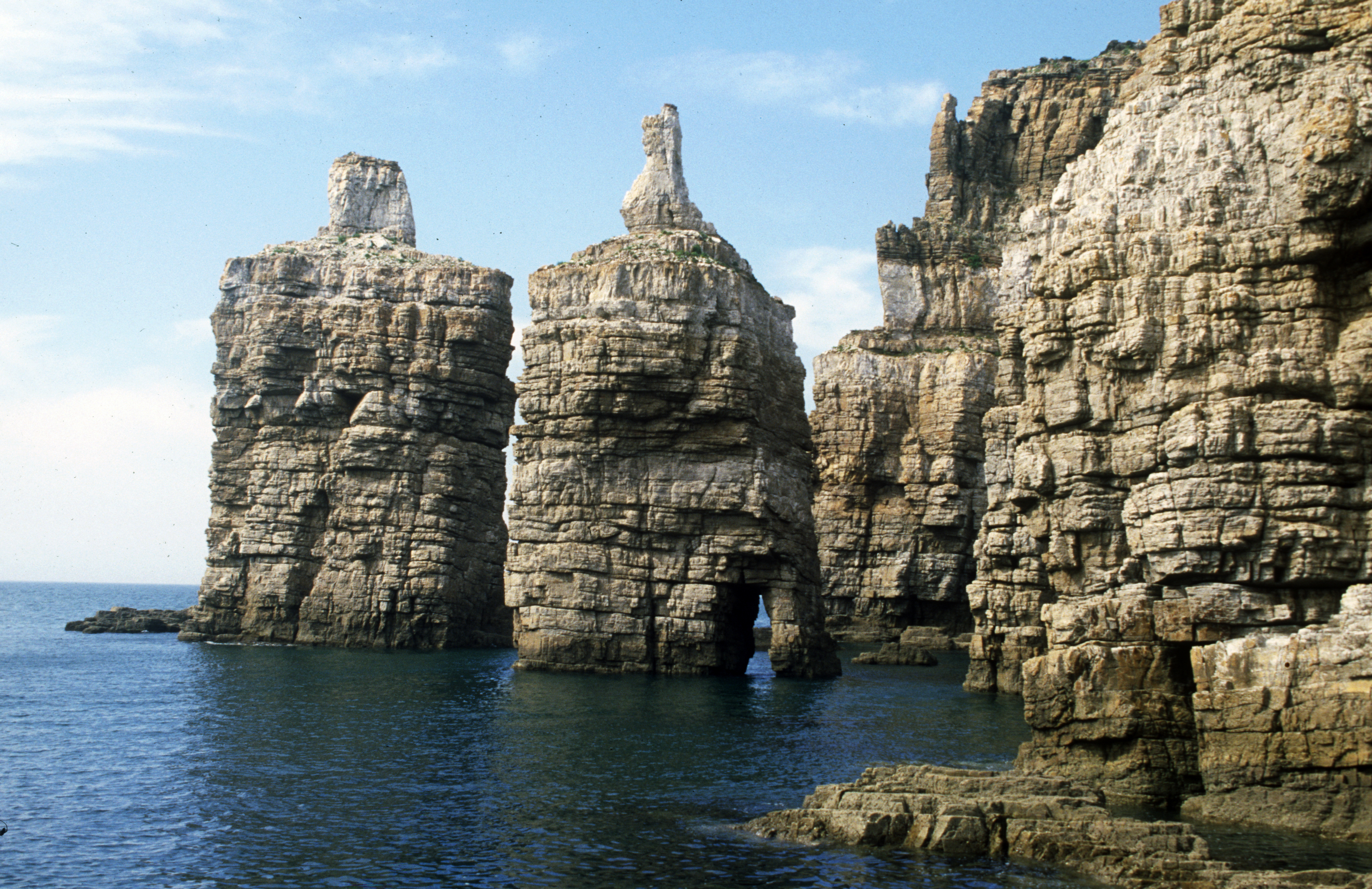
Dumujin Coast

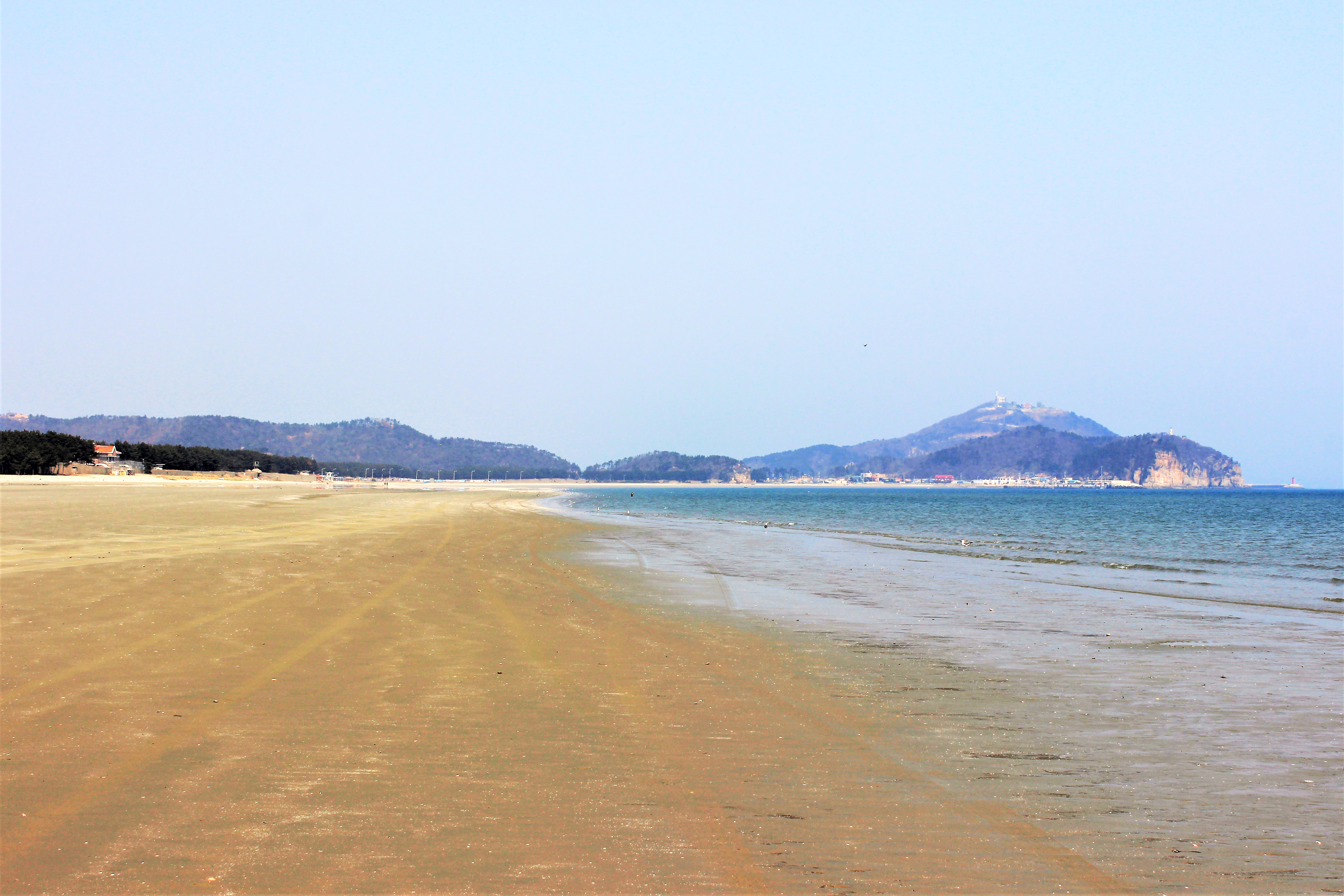
Beach at Sagot Cape

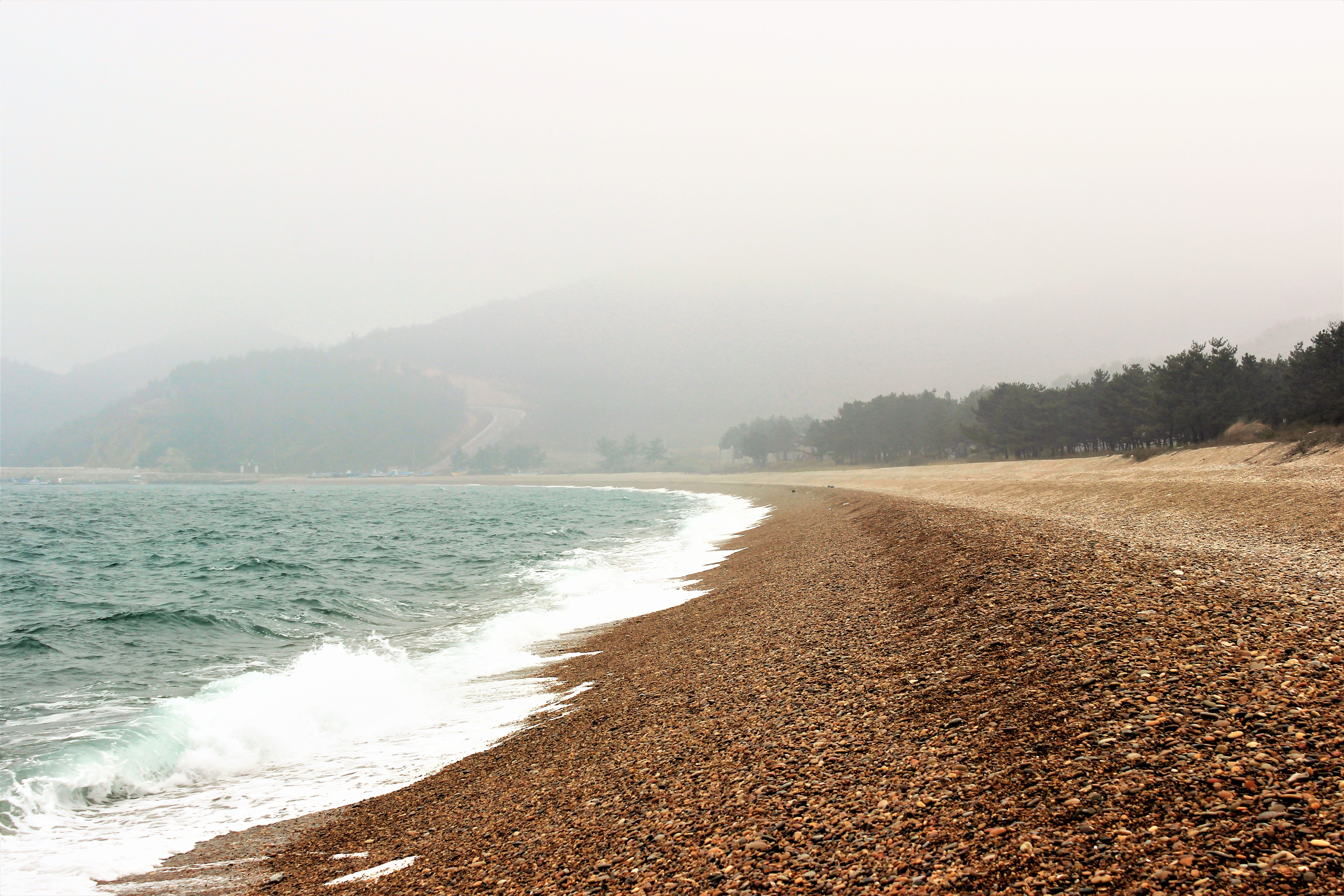
Kongdol Beach

== Geography ==
Baengnyeongdo is located closer to North Korea than it is to the South Korean mainland. It is 191.4 km (118.9 mi) northwest of Incheon, on the South Korean mainland. It has an area of 46.3 km^{2} (17.9 mi^{2}) and a coastline of 52.4 km (32.6 mi). It is South Korea's 14th largest island.

The island was once connected to the mainland as part of a peninsula during the Last Glacial Period. The current portion remained above water after sea levels rose.

The island does not have significant rivers; these only form during the summer monsoon season. The coast of the island is rocky, and there are tidal flats on the southeastern coast.

Changsan Cape in Ryongyon, North Korea, can be seen from Baengnyeong on clear days.

== Environment ==
The area is also rich in oceanic fauna and bird diversity. The Chinese egret, which is considered to be one of the fifty rarest birds in the world, can be found here. The area hosts a nature reserve for spotted seals, and they can be observed on the rocks and beaches. Seals occasionally attract predators such as the great white shark into the area. Finless porpoises also live nearby. The Incheon Coast Guard has been investigating illegal whaling targeting minke whales in the area.

== History ==
In 1895, the island was placed under an administrative district called Baengnyeong-myeon with 17 subdivisions. In 1914, its subdivisions were consolidated into 7. In 1945, it was incorporated into Ongjin County and made part of Gyeonggi Province.

=== Korean War ===
The disputed maritime border between North and South Korea in the Yellow Sea: A: United Nations Command-created Northern Limit Line, 1953. B: North Korea-declared "Inter-Korean MDL", 1999. (Note: "Inter-Korean MDL" is in quotation marks because it comes from an academic source and the writers were particular enough to include in quotes as presented. The broader point is that the maritime demarcation line here is not a formal extension of the Military Demarcation Line; compare with: "NLL—Controversial Sea Border Between S.Korea, DPRK". People's Daily. 21 November 2002.) The locations of specific islands are reflected in the configuration of each maritime boundary, including: 1. Yeonpyeongdo; 2. Baengnyeongdo; 3. Daecheongdo; Other map features: 4. Jung-gu (Incheon Intl. Airport); 5. Seoul; 6. Incheon; 7. Haeju; 8. Kaesong; 9. Ganghwa County; 10. Bukdo Myeon; 11. Deokjeokdo; 12. Jawol Myeon; 13. Yeongheung Myeon

During the Korean War, the USAF designated the airfield on Paengyong-do as K-53. The island was defended by the West Coast Island Defense Task Unit composed of men of the 2nd Korean Marine Corps Regiment under the direction of US Marines. During the war, North Korean refugees settled on the island.

On August 16, 1950, a Lockheed P2V-3 Neptune of the US Navy (122940) ditched 9.7 km (6.1 miles) west of the island after being hit by anti-aircraft fire and catching fire while attacking an enemy vessel near Chinnampo. All 9 occupants survived and were rescued by HMS Kenya. Following this incident, all patrol aircraft were excluded from attack missions in Korea.

In April 1951 Paengyong-do was used as a staging base for a mission to recover wreckage of a downed Mikoyan-Gurevich MiG-15 near the Chongchon River. On 17 April 1951 a USAF Sikorsky H-19 carried a US/South Korean team to the crash site and they photographed the wreck and removed the turbine blades, combustion chamber, exhaust pipe and horizontal stabilizer. The overloaded helicopter then flew the team and samples back to Paengyong-do where they were transferred onto an SA-16 and flown south for evaluation.

The USAF established a communications interception site on the island in mid-1951 which was used to intercept Chinese military communications. In December 1951 two Sikorsky H-5s of the USAF 3d Air Rescue Squadron were based on the island and would forward deploy daily to Chodo Airport to operate search and rescue missions before being permanently deployed to Chodo in January 1952. The H-5s were later replaced by the more capable Sikorsky H-19, two of which were based at Chodo and one on Paengyong-do.

On 12 November 1952 several aircraft, believed to be Po-2s, bombed the base in a night attack causing minimal damage.

=== Post-war ===
In 1974, Daecheongdo and Socheongdo were split off into Daecheong-myeon. In 1995, Ongjin County was made part of Incheon Metropolitan City.

In January 2010, an artillery duel between South Korean ships and North Korean land artillery occurred near Baengnyeong.

=== March 2010 Baengnyeong incident ===
The South Korean naval vessel ROKS Cheonan sank near the island on 26 March 2010. The 1,200-ton vessel broke in two pieces, with nearly half the crew dying (mainly in the stern section) and a little more than half surviving (mainly in the bow section). A multinational investigation concluded that a North Korean torpedo struck the ship although this conclusion has been challenged by others.

== Climate ==
The climate of Baengnyeongdo is a monsoon-influenced humid continental climate (Köppen: Dwa), with precipitation mainly concentrated from May to September.

- Highest Temperature: 33.5 °C (92.3 °F) on July 27, 2002
- Lowest Temperature: −17.4 °C (0.7 °F) on January 21, 2004
- Highest Daily Precipitation: 155.6 millimetres (6.13 in) on July 13, 2022
- Wettest Year: 1,258.4 millimetres (49.54 in) in 2020

Climate data for Baengnyeongdo (2001–2020 normals, extremes 2000–present)
Month	Jan	Feb	Mar	Apr	May	Jun	Jul	Aug	Sep	Oct	Nov	Dec	Year
Record high °C (°F)	9.4 (48.9)	15.5 (59.9)	18.8 (65.8)	23.7 (74.7)	28.1 (82.6)	30.0 (86.0)	33.5 (92.3)	33.2 (91.8)	29.9 (85.8)	25.6 (78.1)	22.7 (72.9)	14.6 (58.3)	33.5 (92.3)
Mean daily maximum °C (°F)	1.2 (34.2)	2.8 (37.0)	7.1 (44.8)	13.0 (55.4)	18.7 (65.7)	22.9 (73.2)	25.4 (77.7)	26.9 (80.4)	23.5 (74.3)	17.7 (63.9)	10.6 (51.1)	3.8 (38.8)	14.5 (58.1)
Daily mean °C (°F)	−1.3 (29.7)	0.0 (32.0)	3.8 (38.8)	9.1 (48.4)	14.5 (58.1)	19.0 (66.2)	22.3 (72.1)	23.8 (74.8)	20.1 (68.2)	14.7 (58.5)	7.9 (46.2)	1.2 (34.2)	11.3 (52.3)
Mean daily minimum °C (°F)	−3.4 (25.9)	−2.2 (28.0)	1.3 (34.3)	6.0 (42.8)	11.1 (52.0)	16.1 (61.0)	19.9 (67.8)	21.5 (70.7)	17.8 (64.0)	12.3 (54.1)	5.5 (41.9)	−1.1 (30.0)	8.7 (47.7)
Record low °C (°F)	−17.4 (0.7)	−15.3 (4.5)	−7.7 (18.1)	0.5 (32.9)	5.0 (41.0)	7.3 (45.1)	13.0 (55.4)	14.1 (57.4)	10.7 (51.3)	2.1 (35.8)	−5.2 (22.6)	−11.3 (11.7)	−17.4 (0.7)
Average precipitation mm (inches)	13.3 (0.52)	17.4 (0.69)	18.2 (0.72)	47.5 (1.87)	74.3 (2.93)	72.0 (2.83)	201.0 (7.91)	158.5 (6.24)	90.6 (3.57)	31.0 (1.22)	41.9 (1.65)	21.6 (0.85)	787.3 (31.00)
Average precipitation days (≥ 0.1 mm)	7.4	4.8	5.3	6.9	8.1	10.0	13.9	11.1	6.7	5.0	8.5	9.9	97.6
Average snowy days	11.0	6.2	2.3	0.1	0.0	0.0	0.0	0.0	0.0	0.2	3.0	12.7	35.5
Average relative humidity (%)	63.4	63.0	65.5	65.7	70.1	80.2	88.0	83.7	75.9	67.8	64.7	63.8	71.0
Mean monthly sunshine hours	139.9	166.6	216.9	219.3	239.6	191.0	136.7	189.6	212.4	217.6	146.7	117.3	2,193.6
Percentage possible sunshine	43.3	54.3	53.9	53.0	51.4	38.6	28.6	40.8	54.5	60.6	49.3	37.9	46.8
Source: Korea Meteorological Administration (percent sunshine 1981–2010)

== Religion ==
Owing to the geographical location, Christianity went through Baengnyeongdo ahead of other Korean regions. After the Gabo Reform, Kim Seong-jin was exiled to this island, and the first church in Korea was established in 1896. There are ten churches on the island at the present time.

== Neighboring islands ==
Two smaller islands nearby are Daecheong Island and the much smaller Socheong Island.
