= Daecheongdo =

Island in South Korea

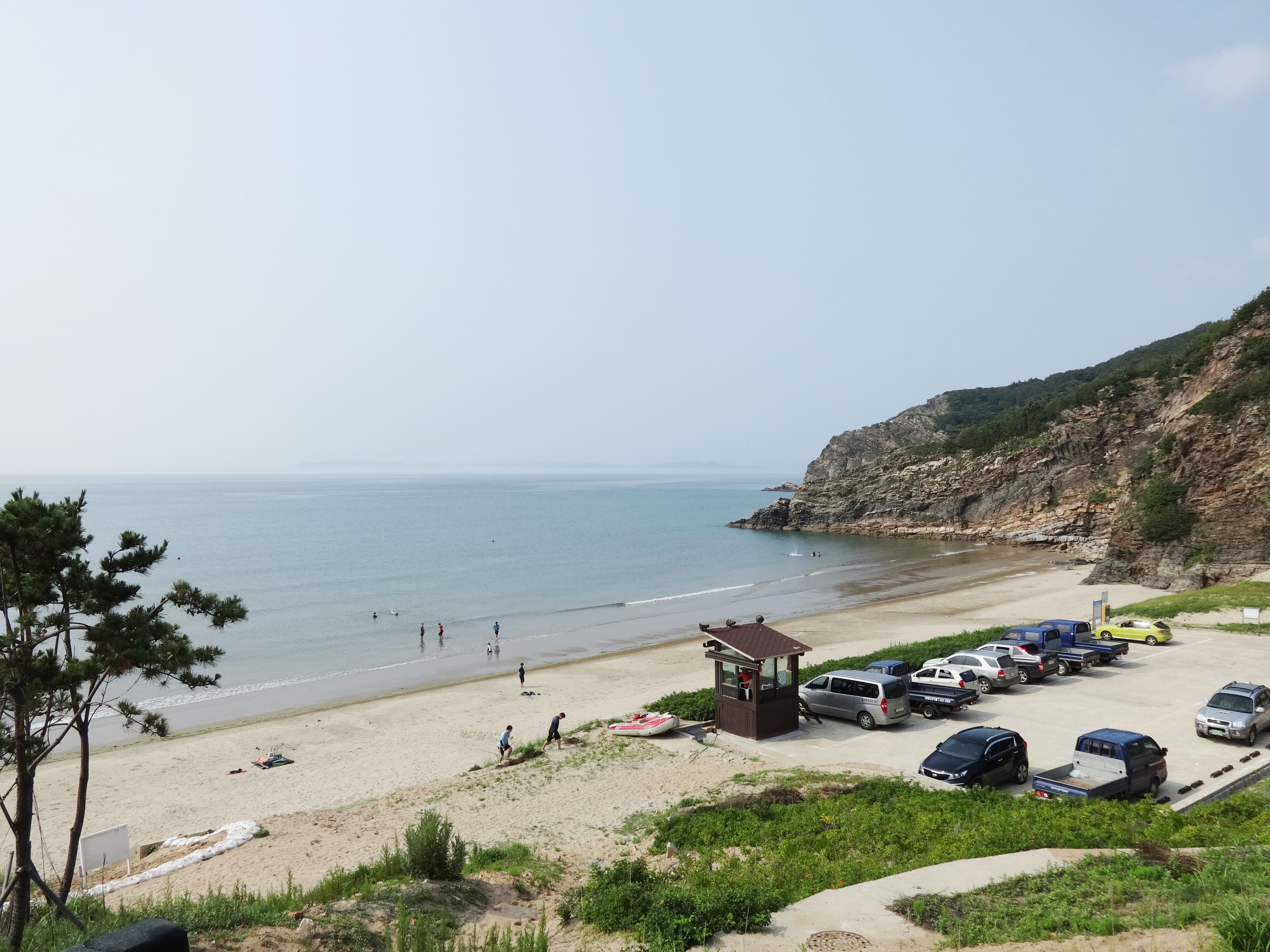
- Jiduri Beach on the island (2015)
- Interactive map of Daecheongdo

Geography
- Coordinates: 37°49′30″N 124°42′00″E

Korean name
- Hangul: 대청도
- Hanja: 大靑島
- RR: Daecheongdo
- MR: Taech'ŏngdo

The disputed maritime boundary between North and South Korea in the Yellow Sea: A: United Nations Command-created Northern Limit Line, 1953. B: North Korea-declared "Inter-Korean MDL", 1999. (Note: "Inter-Korean MDL" is in quotation marks because it comes from an academic source and the writers were particular enough to include in quotes as presented. The broader point is that the maritime demarcation line here is not a formal extension of the Military Demarcation Line; compare with: "NLL—Controversial Sea Border Between S.Korea, DPRK". People's Daily. 21 November 2002.) The locations of specific islands are reflected in the configuration of each maritime boundary, including: 1. Yeonpyeongdo; 2. Baengnyeongdo; 3. Daecheongdo; Other map features: 4. Jung-gu (Incheon Intl. Airport); 5. Seoul; 6. Incheon; 7. Haeju; 8. Kaesong; 9. Ganghwa County; 10. Bukdo Myeon; 11. Deokjeokdo; 12. Jawol Myeon; 13. Yeongheung Myeon

Daecheongdo (Korean: 대청도; lit. 'big blue island'; pronounced [tɛtɕʰʌŋdo]) or Daecheong Island is a 12.63 km^{2} (4.88 sq mi), 7 km (4.3 mi) long and 6.3 km (3.9 mi) wide island in Ongjin County, Incheon, South Korea, near the Northern Limit Line.

The island is 19 km (12 mi) from the coast of South Hwanghae Province in North Korea.

== Description ==
Fishing is popular on the island. Until the late 1980s, skate fishing was a growing industry.

The island is at the northernmost natural range of the Camellia japonica.

Two islands nearby are Baengnyeongdo and the much smaller Socheong Island.

== History ==
It is theorized that Daecheongdo was first inhabited during the Neolithic Age (9500–4500 BC). There are definite signs of habitation from the Goryeo period (918–1392), during which time the island was used as a place of exile for criminals. The Chinese Emperor Toghon Temür (1320–1370) was exiled there by the Mongol Yuan dynasty for conspiring in a plot arranged by his stepmother. Legend says he arrived at the island with a court and 100 relatives, then built a palace. The island was generally uninhabited until 1793, when King Jeongjo, of the Joseon period (1392–1897), imported farmers to cultivate the land. During the Japanese occupation of Korea between 1910 and 1945, there were as many as 10,000 people living there and a large port.

The 1953 Korean Armistice Agreement which ended the Korean War specified that the five islands including Daecheong Island would remain under U.N. and South Korea control. This agreement was signed by both North Korea and the United Nations Command. Since then, it has served as a maritime demarcation between North and South Korea in the Yellow Sea (also called "West Sea" in Korean).

Today, the island has approximately 1,000 residents. The primary economic activity on the island is tourism and fishing.

=== 2009 battle ===
On 10 November 2009, the waters near the island were the scene of a skirmish between the South Korean and North Korean navies. A patrol boat from North Korea was seriously damaged while the navy of South Korea sustained no casualties.
