= Yeonpyeongdo =

Islands of South Korea

Coordinates: 37°40′0″N 125°41′47″E

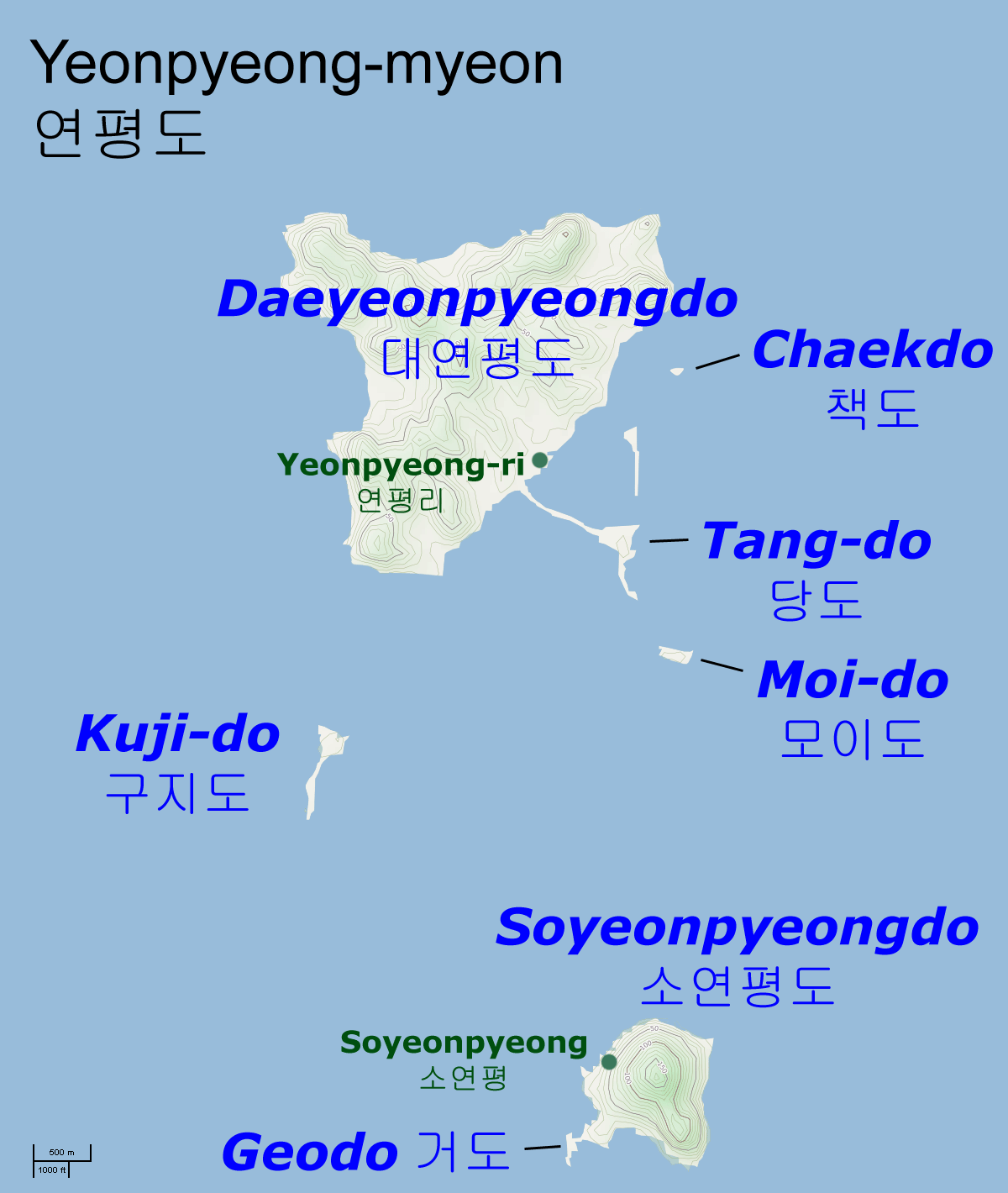
- Map of the Yeonpyeong islands and their main population centers
- Country: South Korea
- Region: Sudogwon
- Provincial level: Incheon

Area
  - Total: 7.29 km^{2} (2.81 sq mi)

Population
  - Total: 1,780

Korean name
- Hangul: 연평도
- Hanja: 延坪島
- RR: Yeonpyeongdo
- MR: Yŏnp'yŏngdo

Yeonpyeongdo (Korean: 연평도; pronounced [jʌnpʰjʌŋdo]) is a group of South Korean islands in the Yellow Sea, located about 80 km (50 mi) west of Incheon and 12 km (7.5 mi) south of the coast of Hwanghae Province, North Korea. The main island of the group is Daeyeonpyeongdo ("Big Yeonpyeong Island"), also referred to simply as Yeonpyeong Island, with an area of 7.01 km^{2} (2.71 sq mi) and a population of around 1,300.

The principal population center is Yeonpyeong-ri, where the island's ferry port is located. The other inhabited island is Soyeonpyeongdo ("Small Yeonpyeong Island") with a small population and an area of 0.24 km^{2} (0.093 sq mi). Several other small islands comprise the rest of the group.

The island group constitutes Yeonpyeong-myeon, a subdivision of Ongjin County, Incheon, South Korea.

Yeonpyeong Island is known for its crab fishery.

== Maritime border disputes ==
The disputed maritime border between North and South Korea in the Yellow Sea: A: United Nations Command-created Northern Limit Line, 1953. B: North Korea-declared "Inter-Korean MDL", 1999. (Note: "Inter-Korean MDL" is in quotation marks because it comes from an academic source and the writers were particular enough to include in quotes as presented. The broader point is that the maritime demarcation line here is not a formal extension of the Military Demarcation Line; compare with: "NLL—Controversial Sea Border Between S.Korea, DPRK". People's Daily. 21 November 2002.) The locations of specific islands are reflected in the configuration of each maritime boundary, including: 1. Yeonpyeongdo; 2. Baengnyeongdo; 3. Daecheongdo; Other map features: 4. Jung-gu (Incheon Intl. Airport); 5. Seoul; 6. Incheon; 7. Haeju; 8. Kaesong; 9. Ganghwa County; 10. Bukdo Myeon; 11. Deokjeokdo; 12. Jawol Myeon; 13. Yeongheung Myeon

Yeonpyeong lies near the Northern Limit Line (NLL) and is only 12 km (7.5 mi) from the North Korean coastline. The 1953 Armistice Agreement which ended the Korean War specified that five island groups, including Yeonpyeong, would remain under South Korean control. North Korea subsequently respected the UN-acknowledged western maritime border for many years until around the mid-1990s.

However, since the 1990s, North Korea has disputed the NLL. The North Korean government claims a border farther south that encompasses valuable fishing grounds (though it skirts around South Korean-held islands such as Yeonpyeong). The claim, nonetheless, is not accepted internationally, because:

1. DPRK's claim is neither based on International law nor Law of the Sea.
2. The United Nations Command insisted that the NLL must be maintained until a new maritime MDL could be established through the United Nations Command Military Armistice Commission on the armistice agreement, and the DPRK claim was not established through the UNCMAC.

== 2010 bombardment ==
On 23 November, North Korean artillery shelled Yeonpyeong with dozens of rounds at Yeonpyeong-ri and the surrounding area. This shelling followed a Southern military exercise in the area. The South returned fire with 155 mm (6 in) K-9 self-propelled howitzers. The shelling damaged dozens of houses as well as Southern military infrastructure and set buildings on fire. Two South Korean Marines and two civilians were killed in the shelling, with eighteen others wounded.

Accounts of the billowing smoke were reported in Korean and international newspapers. Thick columns of black smoke rising from the island were the primary proof that the attack had occurred. South Koreans watching television saw the smoke rising from the island after it was hit.

During the bombardment, most of the residents were hiding in a dugout and then escaped to Incheon on a ferry and a fishing boat. Before the bombardment, the number of residents usually reached about 1400; after the attack, at one time it was down to about 100. It was anticipated that, since the remaining residents were planning to leave as well, the number would keep decreasing. It was also said that there was a relatively high possibility that the island's population would become very scarce. However, in March 2011, 5 months after the bombardment, more than 80% of the residents went back to the island.

In addition, after the attack, there were weapons newly installed to strengthen the security. Because civilians were banned for a time from entering the island, people presumed that it would end up becoming a military base. To their surprise, however, it turned out that the number of the residents increased and the residents are now known to be working in their fields (such as crab fishery) despite the incident. Shelters and dugouts were newly constructed for them to be all able to evacuate in the case of emergencies.

== 2024 bombardment ==
Between the hours of 9:00-11:00 AM on the morning of 5 January, the South Korean military reported around 200 shells fired from the Jangsan and Deungsan Capes, prompting an evacuation of the South Korean islands of Yeonpyeong and Baengnyeong. The evacuations for Yeongpyeong were first at 12:02 PM, then again at 12:30, with the evacuations for Baengnyeong coming at "around the same time."

The shells fell into the ocean in the buffer zone between the two countries. No damage was reported.
