= List of border incidents involving North and South Korea =

The following is a list of border incidents involving North and South Korea since the Korean Armistice Agreement of July 27, 1953, ended large scale military action of the Korean War. Most of these incidents took place near either the Korean Demilitarized Zone (DMZ) or the Northern Limit Line (NLL). This list includes engagements on land, air, and sea, but does not include alleged incursions and terrorist incidents that occurred away from the border. A total of 3,693 armed North Korean agents have infiltrated into South Korea between 1954 and 1992, with 20% of these occurring between 1967 and 1968.

Many of the incidents occurring at sea are due to border disputes. In 1977 North Korea claimed an Exclusive Economic Zone over a large area south of the disputed western maritime border, the Northern Limit Line in the Yellow Sea. This is a prime fishing area, particularly for crabs, and clashes commonly occur, which have been dubbed the "Crab Wars". As of January 2011, North Korea had violated the armistice 221 times, including 26 military attacks.

There have also been incursions into North Korea. In 1976, in now-declassified meeting minutes, U.S. Deputy Secretary of Defense William Clements told Henry Kissinger that there had been 200 raids or incursions into North Korea from the south, though not by the U.S. military. Details of only a few of these incursions have become public, including raids by South Korean forces in 1967 that had sabotaged about 50 North Korean facilities. In 2005 and 2019, US Navy SEALs deployed into North Korea, in the latter operation killing a number of North Korean civilians.

== 1950s ==
- February 16, 1958: North Korean agents hijack a Korean Air Lines flight Changlang en route from Busan to Seoul and land it in Pyongyang; one American pilot, one American passenger, two West German passengers, and 24 other passengers were released in early March, but eight other passengers remained in North Korea.
- March 6, 1958: An American F-86 Sabre is shot down near the DMZ. The pilot (Leon Pfeiffer) was captured and released after 11 days.

== 1960s ==
- May 17, 1963: An American OH-23 helicopter was shot down near the DMZ. The crew (US Army Captains Ben W. Stutts and Carleton W. Voltz) were captured. They were released a year later on May 16, 1964.
- 1964: North Korea creates an underground group: Revolutionary Party for Reunification (통일혁명당), this group is ground down and eliminated by South Korean authorities by 1969.
- September 27, 1964: Four South Korean agents crossed the DMZ and killed 13 North Korean soldiers.
- October 14, 1964: South Korea attempts an assassination of a Korean People's Army division commander.
- April 27, 1965: Two North Korean MiG-17s attack a United States Air Force RB-47 Stratojet reconnaissance plane above the Sea of Japan, 80 km (50 mi) from the North Korean shore. The aircraft was damaged, but managed to land at Yokota Air Base, Japan.
- October 1966–October 1969: The Korean DMZ Conflict, a series of skirmishes along the DMZ, results in 75 American, 299 South Korean and 397 North Korean soldiers killed.
- January 19, 1967: ROKS Dangpo (PCEC 56) (formerly the USS Marfa (PCE-842)), is sunk by North Korean coastal artillery north of the maritime demarcation line off the east coast of Korea, 39 sailors of the crew of 79 are killed.
- October 18, 1967: Six South Korean agents crossed the DMZ and accessed a North Korean guard post, in the process 20 North Korean soldiers were killed and one South Korean agent died.
- January 17, 1968: In an incident known as the Blue House Raid, a 31-man detachment from the Korean People's Army secretly crosses the DMZ on a mission to kill South Korean President Park Chung-hee on January 21, nearly succeeding. The incursion was discovered after South Korean civilians confronted the North Koreans and informed the authorities. After entering Seoul disguised as South Korean soldiers, the North Koreans attempt to enter the Blue House (the official residence of the President of South Korea). The North Koreans were confronted by South Korean police and a firefight ensued. The North Koreans fled Seoul and individually attempted to cross the DMZ back to North Korea. Of the original group of 31 North Koreans, 28 were killed, one was captured, and two are unaccounted for. Additionally, 26 South Koreans were killed and 66 were wounded, the majority of whom were soldiers and police officers. Three American soldiers were also killed and three were wounded.
- January 23, 1968: The U.S. Navy intelligence ship USS Pueblo was attacked by the Korean People's Navy employing Soviet-built patrol boats and is subsequently boarded and captured, along with its crew, in the Sea of Japan. The entire crew of 83 is captured, with the exception of one sailor killed in the initial attack on the vessel, and the vessel was taken to a North Korean port. Tortured during their imprisonment, all the captives were released on December 23 of the same year via the Bridge of No Return at the DMZ. The USS Pueblo is still in North Korean possession and docked in Pyongyang on display as a museum ship.
- From March 1968 and March 1969, various military skirmishes took place in the Paektusan region between the North Korean and Chinese armed forces.
- October 30, 1968: From October 30 to November 2, 120 to 130 North Korean Unit 124 commandos land on the northeast shore of South Korea, allegedly to establish a base in order to wage a guerrilla war against the South Korean government. 70,000 ROK soldiers were involved in the ensuing search-and-destroy operation. A total of 110 to 113 North Korean commandos were killed, seven were captured, and 13 escaped. A total of 40 South Korean soldiers and law enforcement officers were killed as well as 23 civilians.
- March 17, 1969: Six North Korean commandos kill a South Korean police officer near Jumunjin, Gangwon-do. Seven American soldiers are killed in a North Korean attack along the DMZ.
- April 15, 1969: A U.S. Navy EC-121M Warning Star reconnaissance aircraft is shot down 90 miles (140 km) in international waters east of the North Korean coast, leaving 31 dead.
- August 17, 1969: Three US soldiers were wounded and captured when their helicopter was shot down for straying into North Korean airspace. They were released 108 days later when the US apologized.
- October 1969: Four US soldiers are killed by North Koreans in the DMZ. The four U.S. Soldiers from the 7th Infantry Division were traveling in a truck marked with a white flag and labeled with a sign that said “DMZ Police” when they were ambushed by a North Korean patrol with rifle fire and grenades. The North Koreans then went up to the truck and shot each soldier in the head at close range to ensure they were dead. The ambush killed Staff Sergeant James R. Grissinger, Specialist Charles E. Taylor, Specialist Jack L. Morris, and Private First Class William E. Grimes.
- December 11, 1969: North Korean agent Cho Chang-hui hijacked a Korean Air Lines YS-11 flying from Gangneung Airbase in Gangneung, Gangwon Province to Gimpo International Airport in Seoul. It was carrying four crewmembers and 46 passengers (excluding Cho); 39 of the passengers were returned two months later, but the crew and seven passengers remained in North Korea. The aircraft was damaged beyond repair on landing.

== 1970s ==
- April 1970: At Kumchon, Gyeonggi Province, a clash leaves three North Korean infiltrators dead and five South Korean soldiers wounded.
- June 1970: The Korean People's Navy seizes a broadcast vessel from the South near the Northern Limit Line. 20 crew are captured.
- February 1974: Two South Korean fishing vessels are sunk and 30 crew detained by the North.
- June 1974: Three North Korean gunboats attacked and sank a Korea Coast Guard patrol craft (863) in the Sea of Japan near the maritime demarcation border. 26 South Korean coast guardsmen killed. South Korean and North Korean fighter jets engage each other over the sea battle but do not fire upon each other.
- 1974: The first North Korean infiltration tunnel into South Korea is discovered. Three following tunnels were found in 1975, 1978, 1990. The joint South Korean-U.S. investigation team trip a North Korean booby-trap, killing one American and wounding six others.
- March 1975: The second North Korean infiltration tunnel is discovered.
- June 1976: An incursion south of the DMZ in Gangwon-do leaves three dead from the North and six from the South.
- August 18, 1976: The Axe murder incident— an attempt to trim a tree in the DMZ near Panmunjom— ends with two US soldiers dead and injuries to another four U.S. soldiers and five South Korean soldiers.
- July 14, 1977: A U.S. Army CH-47 Chinook helicopter is shot down after straying into the north over the DMZ. Three airmen are killed and one is briefly held prisoner (this was the sixth such incident since the armistice was signed). The Carter Administration apologized for the incident and paid reparations to North Korea.
- October 1978: The third North Korean infiltration tunnel is discovered.
- October 27, 1979: U.S. patrol fired upon at night after the assassination of South Korean President Park.
- October 28, 1979: Second event U.S. patrol fired upon at night.
- October 1979: Three North Korean agents attempting to infiltrate the eastern sector of the DMZ are intercepted, killing one of the agents.
- December 6, 1979: A U.S. patrol in the DMZ accidentally crosses the MDL into a North Korean minefield in heavy fog. One U.S. soldier is killed and four are injured; the body is recovered from North Korea five days later.

== 1980s ==
- March 1980: Three North Koreans are killed while trying to cross the Han River estuary into the South.
- May 1980: North Koreans engage US/ROK Outpost Ouellette on the DMZ in a firefight. One North Korean is wounded in action.
- March 1981: Three North Koreans try to enter South Korea in Geumhwa-eup, Cheorwon, Gangwon-do; one is killed.
- July 1981: Three North Koreans are killed trying to cross the upper Imjin River to the South.
- May 1982: Two North Korean infiltrators are spotted on the east coast, with one being killed.
- December 1983: U.S. soldiers encounter attempted infiltration of North Korean soldiers over the MDL south into the American sector but were repelled by the QRF deployed from Camp Greaves, South Korea.
- December 3, 1983: South Korean troops capture a North Korean submersible and two North Korean frogmen. The submersible is now on display at the War Memorial of Korea.
- April 1984: South Korean agents entered the DMZ near the Imjin River, a single agent killed by a landmine with body recovered by North Korean soldiers.
- November 23, 1984: Three North Korean soldiers and one South Korean soldier are killed, and one American soldier wounded in a firefight that broke out after a Soviet defector fled across the DMZ into South Korea.
- November 1987: One American soldier and two North Korean soldiers die, and one American soldier is wounded during the firefight that erupted when a North Korean security detail confronted a sniper detail across the MDL into the southern-controlled sector of the Joint Security Area.
- November 1987: One South Korean killed at the DMZ central sector by North Korean sniper fire.

== 1990s ==
- March 1990: The fourth North Korean infiltration tunnel is discovered, in what may be a total of seventeen tunnels in all.
- May 1992: Three North Korean soldiers in South Korean uniforms are killed at Cheorwon, Gangwon-do; three South Korean soldiers are wounded.
- December 17, 1994: A U.S. Army OH-58A+ Kiowa helicopter inadvertently crosses 10 km into North Korean territory and is shot down. Of the crew of two, one dies and the other is held for 13 days. The Clinton Administration apologized for the incident and paid reparations to North Korea.
- May 1995: North Korean forces fire on a South Korean fishing boat, killing three.
- October 14, 1995: Two North Korean agents fire upon South Korean police as they attempted to find and make contact with an alleged North Korean spy. One South Korean policeman was killed and another two were wounded. The two agents fled the scene which triggered a three-day manhunt which resulted in one agent being killed and the other (Kim Do Shik) being captured.
- April 1996: Several hundred armed North Korean troops enter the DMZ at the Joint Security Area and elsewhere on three occasions, in violation of the Korean armistice agreement.
- May 1996: Seven Northern soldiers cross the DMZ, but withdraw after warning shots are fired.
- May & June 1996: North Korean vessels twice cross the Northern Limit Line and have a several-hour standoff with the South Korean navy.
- September 1996: A North Korean Sang-O-class submarine inserts a reconnaissance team and runs aground on the east coast of South Korea near Jeongdongjin, 20 kilometres south-east of Gangneung, Gangwon-do, leading to a 49-day manhunt for the 26 crewmen.
- April 1997: Five North Korean soldiers cross the DMZ in Cheolwon, Gangwon-do, and fire on South Korean positions.
- June 1997: Three North Korean vessels cross the Northern Limit Line and attack South Korean vessels two miles (3.2 km) south of the line. On land, fourteen North Korean soldiers cross 70 m south of the center of the DMZ, leading to a 23-minute exchange of fire.
- June 1998: A North Korean Yugo-class submarine became entangled in a fishing driftnet. It was salvaged on 25 June and the bodies of nine crewmen were recovered all dead by gunshot wounds.
- July 1998: A dead North Korean frogman was found with paraphernalia on a beach south of the DMZ.
- December 17, 1998: The 1998 Yeosu submersible incident, where a North Korean submersible was spotted and sunk by South Korean patrol boats. The submersible was eventually recovered in March 1999 where the bodies of four North Korean frogmen were recovered.
- June 1999: The First Battle of Yeonpyeong, a series of clashes between North and South Korean vessels, takes place in the Yellow Sea near the Northern Limit Line.

== 2000s ==
- October 26, 2000: Two US aircraft observing a ROK army military exercise accidentally cross over the DMZ. The Clinton Administration apologized for the incident and paid reparations to North Korea.
- 2001: On twelve separate occasions, North Korean vessels cross the Northern Limit Line and then withdraw.
- November 27, 2001: North and South Korean forces exchange fire without injuries.
- June 29, 2002: The second battle of Yeonpyeong leads to the deaths of six South Korean sailors and the sinking of a South Korean vessel. The number of North Koreans killed is unknown.
- November 16, 2002: South Korean forces fire warning shots on a Northern boat crossing the Northern Limit Line. The boat withdraws. The similar incident is repeated on November 20.
- February 19, 2003: A North Korean fighter plane crosses seven miles (11 km) south of the Northern Limit Line, and returns north after being intercepted by six South Korean planes.
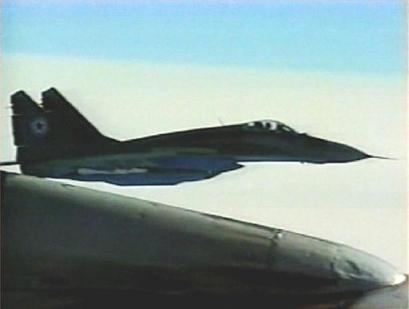
  North Korean MiG-29 Fulcrum in 2003.
- March 2, 2003: Four North Korean fighter jets (two MiG-29s and possibly two MiG-23MLs) intercept a US RC-135S Cobra Ball reconnaissance plane over the Sea of Japan. US officials later alleged that they intended to force the plane to land in North Korea and take the crew as hostages.
- July 17, 2003: North and South Korean forces exchange fire at the DMZ around 6 AM. The South Korean army reports four rounds fired from the North and seventeen from the South. No injuries are reported.
- November 1, 2004: North Korean vessels, claiming to be in pursuit of illegal fishing craft, cross the Northern Limit Line and are fired upon by the South. The vessels withdraw 3 hours later.
- May 26, 2006: Two North Korean soldiers enter the DMZ and cross into South Korea. They return after South Korean soldiers fire warning shots.
- July 30, 2006: Several gunshots are exchanged near a South Korean post in Yanggu, Gangwon.
- October 7, 2006: South Korean soldiers fire warning shots after five North Korean soldiers cross briefly onto their side of the border.
- October 27, 2009: A South Korean pig farmer, who was wanted for assault, cut a hole in the DMZ fence and defected to North Korea.
- November 10, 2009: Naval vessels from the two Koreas exchanged fire in the area of the NLL, reportedly causing serious damage to a North Korean patrol ship. For more details of this incident, see Battle of Daecheong.
- December 2, 2009: A North Korean sergeant was rescued by South Korean sailors after his fishing boat drifted into South Korean waters. The soldier did not wish to defect and was repatriated to the North via the JSA.

== 2010s ==
- January 27, 2010: North Korea fires artillery shells into the water near Baengnyeong Island and South Korean vessels return fire. Three days later, North Korea continued to fire artillery towards the area.
- March 26, 2010: A Republic of Korea Navy vessel, the ROKS Cheonan, was allegedly sunk by a North Korean torpedo near Baengnyeong Island in the Yellow Sea. A rescue operation recovered 58 survivors but 46 sailors were killed. On May 20, 2010, a South Korean led international investigation group concluded that the sinking of the warship was in fact the result of a North Korean torpedo attack. North Korea denied involvement. The United Nations Security Council made a Presidential Statement condemning the attack but without identifying the attacker.
- October 29, 2010: Two shots are fired from North Korea toward a South Korean post near Hwacheon and South Korean troops fire three shots in return.
- November 23, 2010: North Korea fired artillery at South Korea's Greater Yeonpyeong Island in the Yellow Sea and the Republic of Korea Armed Forces returned fire. Two South Korean marines and two South Korean civilians were killed, six were seriously wounded, and ten were treated for minor injuries. About seventy South Korean houses were destroyed. North Korean casualties were unknown, but Lee Hong-gi, the Director of Operations of the South Korean Joint Chiefs of Staff (JCS), claimed that as a result of the South Korean retaliation "there may be a considerable number of North Korean casualties".
- October 6, 2012: An 18-year-old Korean People's Army private defected to South Korea. He was apparently not detected as he crossed the DMZ and had to knock on an ROK barracks door to draw attention to himself. The soldier later told investigators that he defected after killing two of his superiors.
- September 16, 2013: Nam Yong-ho, a 47-year-old South Korean, was shot dead by South Korean soldiers while trying to swim across the Tanpocheon Stream near Paju to North Korea. He had previously made an application for political asylum in Japan, but this was rejected.
- February 26, 2014: South Korean defense officials claim that despite warnings a North Korean warship has repeatedly crossed into South Korean waters overnight.
- March 24, 2014: A North Korean drone is found crashed near Paju. The onboard cameras contain pictures of the Blue House and military installations near the DMZ. Another North Korean drone crashes on Baengnyeongdo on March 31.
- October 10, 2014: North Korean forces fire anti-aircraft rounds at propaganda balloons launched from Paju. South Korean military return fire after a warning.
- October 19, 2014: A group of North Korean soldiers approach the South Korean border and South Korean soldiers fire warning shots. The North Korean soldiers return fire before retreating. No injuries or property damage result.
- June 15, 2015: A teenaged North Korean soldier walks across the DMZ and defects at a South Korean guard post in north-eastern Hwacheon.
- August 4, 2015: Two South Korean soldiers were wounded after stepping on landmines that had allegedly been laid on the southern side of the DMZ by North Korean forces next to a ROK guard post. Kim Jin-moon of the South Korean-based Korea Institute for Defense Analyses, suggested that the incident was planned by members of the General Bureau of Reconnaissance to prove their loyalty to Kim Jong Un.
- August 20, 2015: As a reaction to the August 4 landmines, South Korea resumed playing propaganda on loudspeakers near the border. In 2004, both sides had agreed to end their loudspeaker broadcasts at each other. North Korea threatened to attack those loudspeakers, and on August 20 North Korea fired a rocket and shells across the border into Yeoncheon County. South Korea responded by firing artillery shells back at the origin of the rocket. There were no reports of injuries on either side. Following threats of war from the North, and various troop movements by both North and South Korea and the United States, an agreement was reached on August 24 that North Korea would express sympathy for the landmine incident in return for South Korea deactivating the loudspeakers.
- January 3, 2016: South Korean soldiers fired warning shots at a suspected North Korean drone near the DMZ.
- November 13, 2017: North Korean soldier Oh Chong-song defected by crossing the demarcation line in the JSA. The defector was shot by other KPA soldiers and was found about 55 yards (165 ft; 50 m) from the demarcation line. (Note: The two November 13, 2017 incidents are unrelated.)
- November 13, 2017: A roughly 59-year-old man from Louisiana was arrested by South Korean forces for crossing the civilian control line just outside the DMZ, without government permission, as part of an attempt to enter North Korea. The man claimed that his crossing would alleviate tensions between the two nations. He was handed to the immigration office 2 days later to be deported, but an exact date was not provided.
- December 21, 2017: A North Korean soldier crossed the DMZ to defect to South Korea. 40 minutes later shots were fired on the North Korean side of the DMZ, though the defector was not fired upon.
- August 12, 2018: A South Korean citizen was arrested for attempting to illegally enter North Korea. According to the reports, a 34-year-old man surnamed Suh drove an SUV through the checkpoint on the South Korean side of the Unification Bridge in Paju, which leads to the DMZ, without undergoing proper inspection. Suh was caught by South Korean troops at the joint security area of Panmunjom, at a reservoir located 6 kilometers (3.7 mi) away from the bridge. This was Suh's second known attempt to enter North Korea.
- November 16, 2018: A South Korean soldier was found dead with a gunshot wound to his head at a toilet within a guard post (GP) on the eastern section of the border with North Korea. The death was ruled to be a suicide.
- early 2019: In a failed operation to plant a listening device to monitor the North Korean leader's communications, eight US Navy SEALs deployed into North Korea from a nuclear-powered submarine using two mini-submarines, killing a number of North Korean civilians.

== 2020s ==
- May 3, 2020: A South Korean guard post inside the DMZ was hit by multiple bullets coming from North Korea, prompting South Korea to broadcast a warning and return fire twice. Afterwards, South Korea took action via the inter-Korean communication channels to prevent further incidents.
- September 22, 2020: A South Korean official (Lee Dae-jun) of the Ministry of Maritime Affairs and Fisheries disappeared from his patrol boat that was 6 miles (5.2 nmi; 9.7 km) south of the NLL. He was found wearing a life jacket by a North Korean fishing patrol, which was ordered to shoot him and burn his body. North Korea's leader Kim Jong-un apologized to South Korea's leader Moon Jae-in for killing the South Korean official.
- October 24, 2022: South Korean forces fired warning shots after a North Korean merchant vessel crossed the NLL, forcing it to return to the northern side. North Korean coastal defenses responded by firing ten artillery warning shots toward what it viewed as its territorial waters near where intruding South Korean naval movements were detected.
- December 26, 2022: Five North Korean drones crossed the DMZ into South Korea, which scrambled aircraft to intercept them; one of the South Korean KA-1 light attack aircraft crashed during takeoff. It is believed that North Korea launched the drones in response to criticism of the quality of North Korean satellite images.
- July 18, 2023: Travis King, a U.S. soldier who was at the border as part of a tour of the Joint Security Area, crossed the military demarcation line into North Korea and was detained by the North Korean military until his release on September 27.
- January 5, 2024: North Korean shelling of the buffer zone between the two countries near Yeonpyeong Island causes South Korea to order a civilian evacuation.
- May 28, 2024: North Korea launches trash bags into South Korea via balloons. In retaliation, South Korea suspends its half of the 2018 Panmunjom Declaration on June 4, 2024.
- June 9, 2024: South Korean soldiers fire warning shots at North Korean soldiers who inadvertently crossed the Korean Demarcation Line. It was reported that the North Koreans were carrying pickaxes, and some were armed.
- June 18, 2024: South Korean troops fire warning shots at 20-30 North Korean troops who crossed the Korean Demarcation Line. The North Korean soldiers were conducting construction work near the border. The South Korean government state that there were no hostile intentions.
- June 21, 2024: North Korean soldiers cross the MDL. After failing to acknowledge vocal warnings by South Korean troops, they fired warning shots at the North Koreans who immediately withdrew.
- August 20, 2024: A North Korean Army Staff Sergeant defects to South Korea after crossing the DMZ near Goseong County, Gangwon. The soldier is immediately taken into custody by South Korean soldiers.
- October 15, 2024: North Korea blows up communication roads connecting to South Korea and threatens to end all ties. Parts of Donghae line on the East coast and Gyeongui line on the West coast, the two major road and railway links connecting the North to the South, were destroyed by explosives according to Seoul's Joint Chiefs of Staff (JCS) at 12 pm.
- October 24, 2024: North Korea launches another series of trash balloons across South Korea. Some of the balloons land inside the Blue House perimeter. Many of the balloons are reported to have propaganda leaflets containing criticism against President Yoon Suk Yeol.
- April 8, 2025: South Korean troops fire warning shots at 10 North Koreans soldiers who crossed the DMZ. The North Koreans withdrew without further incident.
- August 23, 2025: South Korean soldiers use .50 caliber machineguns to fire warning shots at 30 North Korean soldiers who crossed the Korean DMZ.
- September 26, 2025: South Korean forces fired warning shots after a North Korean merchant vessel crossed the NLL, forcing it to return to the northern side.
- August 2026: South Korean officials report that South Korean troops fired warning shots at North Korean troops who strayed across the DMZ.
- September 21, 2026: Three South Korean military officers are wounded by explosions while patrolling the DMZ. South Korean officials stated that the likely culprit were North Korean landmines.

== See also ==
- Korean conflict
- Aftermath of the Korean War
- Division of Korea
- 38th parallel north
