= Korean conflict =

Ongoing conflict between North and South Korea before and following the Korean War

Coordinates: 38°19′N 127°14′E

- Part of the Cold War in Asia (until 1991)
- North Korean soldiers and South Korean Military Police stand in Panmunjom, Korean DMZ, 1998
Date	9 September 1948 – present (78 years, 1 month and 20 days)
Location	Korean Peninsula
Status	Unresolved

Belligerents
South Korea	North Korea

Commanders and leaders
Lee Jae-myung (2025–present) Former: Lee Ju-ho (2025); Yoon Suk Yeol (2022–2025); Moon Jae-in (2017–2022); Hwang Kyo-ahn (2017); Park Geun-hye (2013–2017); Lee Myung-bak (2008–2013); Roh Moo-hyun (2003–2008); Kim Dae-jung (1998–2003); Kim Young-sam (1993–1998); Roh Tae-woo (1988–1993); Chun Doo-hwan (1980–1988); Choi Kyu-hah (1979–1980); Park Chung Hee X (1962–1979); Yun Posun (1960–1962); Baek Nak-jun (1960); Kwak Sang-hoon (1960); Ho Chong (1960; two times -- after Kwak Sang-hoon); Syngman Rhee (1948–1960)	Kim Jong Un (2011–present) Former: Kim Jong Il # (1994–2011); Kim Il Sung # (1948–1994)
- See Korean War for details of belligerents during the war.

The Korean conflict is an ongoing conflict based on the division of Korea between North Korea (Democratic People's Republic of Korea) and South Korea (Republic of Korea). During the Cold War, North Korea was backed by the Soviet Union, China, and other communist allies, while South Korea was backed by the United States, United Kingdom, and other Western allies.

The division of Korea by the United States and the Soviet Union occurred in 1945 after the defeat of Japan ended Japanese rule of Korea, and both superpowers created separate governments in 1948. Tensions erupted into the Korean War, which lasted from 1950 to 1953. When the war ended, both countries were devastated, but the division remained. North and South Korea continued a military standoff, with periodic clashes. The conflict survived the end of the Cold War and is still ongoing. It is now considered one of the 10 frozen conflicts of the world and is considered one of the oldest, alongside the cross-strait conflict.

The U.S. maintains a military presence in the South to assist South Korea in accordance with the ROK–U.S. Mutual Defense Treaty. In 1997, U.S. president Bill Clinton described the division of Korea as the "Cold War's last divide". In 2002, U.S. president George W. Bush described North Korea as a member of an "axis of evil". Facing increasing isolation, North Korea developed missile and nuclear capabilities.

A period of heightened tension began in 2017, but the following year North Korea, South Korea and the U.S. held a series of summits, which promised peace and nuclear disarmament. This led to the Panmunjom Declaration on 27 April 2018, when the North and the South agreed to work together to denuclearize the peninsula, improve inter-Korean relations, end the conflict officially, and move towards the peaceful reunification. In subsequent years, diplomatic efforts faltered and military confrontation returned to the fore.

The Korean border remains the most militarized area in the world with the presence of the Korean People's Army in north; the Forces of the Republic of Korea and the United States Forces Korea (highlighted notably through the Combined Forces) in south and the presence of the forces of United Nations in the Korean Demilitarized Zone (JSA and Camp Bonifas).

== Background ==
Korea was annexed by the Empire of Japan on 22 August 1910, and ruled by it until 2 September 1945. During the Japanese occupation of Korea, nationalist and radical groups emerged, mostly in exile, to struggle for independence. Divergent in their outlooks and approaches, these groups failed to unite into a single national movement. Based in China, the Korean Provisional Government failed to obtain widespread recognition. The many leaders advocating for Korean independence included the conservative and U.S.-educated Syngman Rhee, who lobbied the U.S. government, and the Communist Kim Il Sung, who fought a guerrilla war against the Japanese from neighboring Manchuria.

Following the end of the occupation, many high-ranking Koreans were accused of collaborating with Japanese imperialism. An intense and bloody struggle between various figures and political groups aspiring to lead Korea ensued.

== Division of Korea (1945–1949) ==
On 9 August 1945, as agreed by the Allies at the Potsdam Conference, the Soviet Union declared war on Japan and advanced into Korea. The U.S. government requested that the Soviet advance stop at the 38th parallel. The U.S. forces were to occupy the area south of the 38th parallel, including the capital, Seoul. This division of Korea into two zones of occupation was incorporated into General Order No. 1, which was given to Japanese forces after the surrender of Japan on 15 August 1945. On 24 August 1945, the Red Army entered Pyongyang and established a military government over Korea north of the parallel. American forces landed in the south on 8 September 1945, and established the U.S. Army Military Government in Korea.

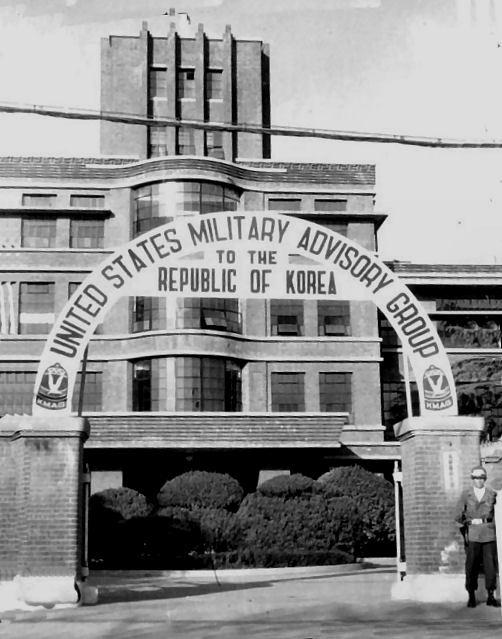
U.S. Military Advisory Group Headquarters, South Korea, c. 1950

The Allies had originally envisaged a joint trusteeship which would steer Korea towards independence, but most Korean nationalists wanted independence immediately. Meanwhile, the wartime co-operation between the Soviet Union and the U.S. deteriorated as the Cold War took hold. Both occupying powers began promoting into positions of authority Koreans aligned with their side of politics and marginalizing their opponents. Many of these emerging political leaders were returning exiles with little popular support. In North Korea, the Soviet Union supported Korean communists. Kim Il Sung, who from 1941 had served in the Soviet Army, became the major political figure. Society was centralized and collectivized, following the Soviet model. Politics in the South were more tumultuous, but the strongly anti-communist Syngman Rhee, who had been educated in the U.S., was positioned as the most prominent politician.

In South Korea, a general election was held on 10 May 1948. The Republic of Korea (or ROK) was established with Syngman Rhee as president, and formally replaced the U.S. military occupation on 15 August. In North Korea, the Democratic People's Republic of Korea (or DPRK) was declared on 8 September, with Kim Il Sung, as prime minister. Soviet occupation forces left the DPRK on 10 December 1948. U.S. forces left the ROK the following year, though the U.S. Korean Military Advisory Group remained to train the Republic of Korea Army. The new regimes even adopted different names for Korea: the North choosing Choson, and the South Hanguk.

Both opposing governments considered themselves to be the government of the whole of Korean Peninsula (as they do to this day), and both saw the division as temporary. Kim Il Sung lobbied Stalin and Mao for support in a war of reunification, while Syngman Rhee repeatedly expressed his desire to conquer the North. In 1948, North Korea, which had almost all the generators, turned off the electricity supply to the South. In the lead-up to the outbreak of civil war, there were frequent clashes along the 38th parallel, especially at Kaesong and Ongjin, initiated by both sides.

Throughout this period there were uprisings in the South, such as the Jeju uprising and the Yeosu–Suncheon rebellion, that were brutally suppressed. In all, over one hundred thousand people died in fighting across Korea before the Korean War began.

== Korean War (1950–1953) ==
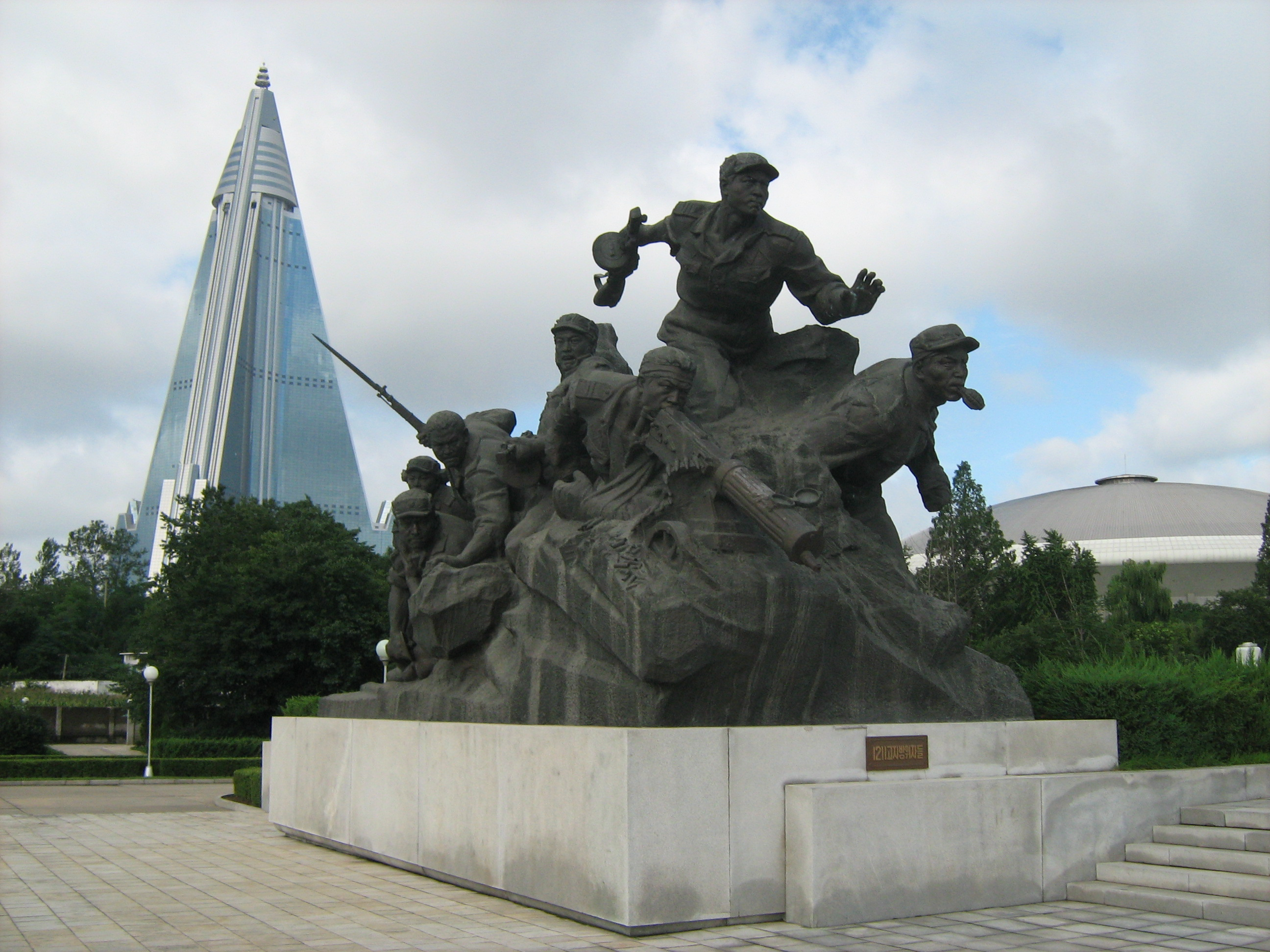
The Korean War Memorial in Pyongyang, North Korea, with the pyramidal Ryugyong Hotel in the background

By 1950, North Korea had clear military superiority over the South. The Soviet occupiers had armed it with surplus weaponry and provided training. Many troops returning to North Korea were battle-hardened from their participation in the Chinese Civil War, which had just ended.

North Korea invaded the South on 25 June 1950, and swiftly overran most of the country. Kim Il Sung expected a quick victory, predicting that there would be pro-communist uprisings in the South and that the U.S. would not intervene.

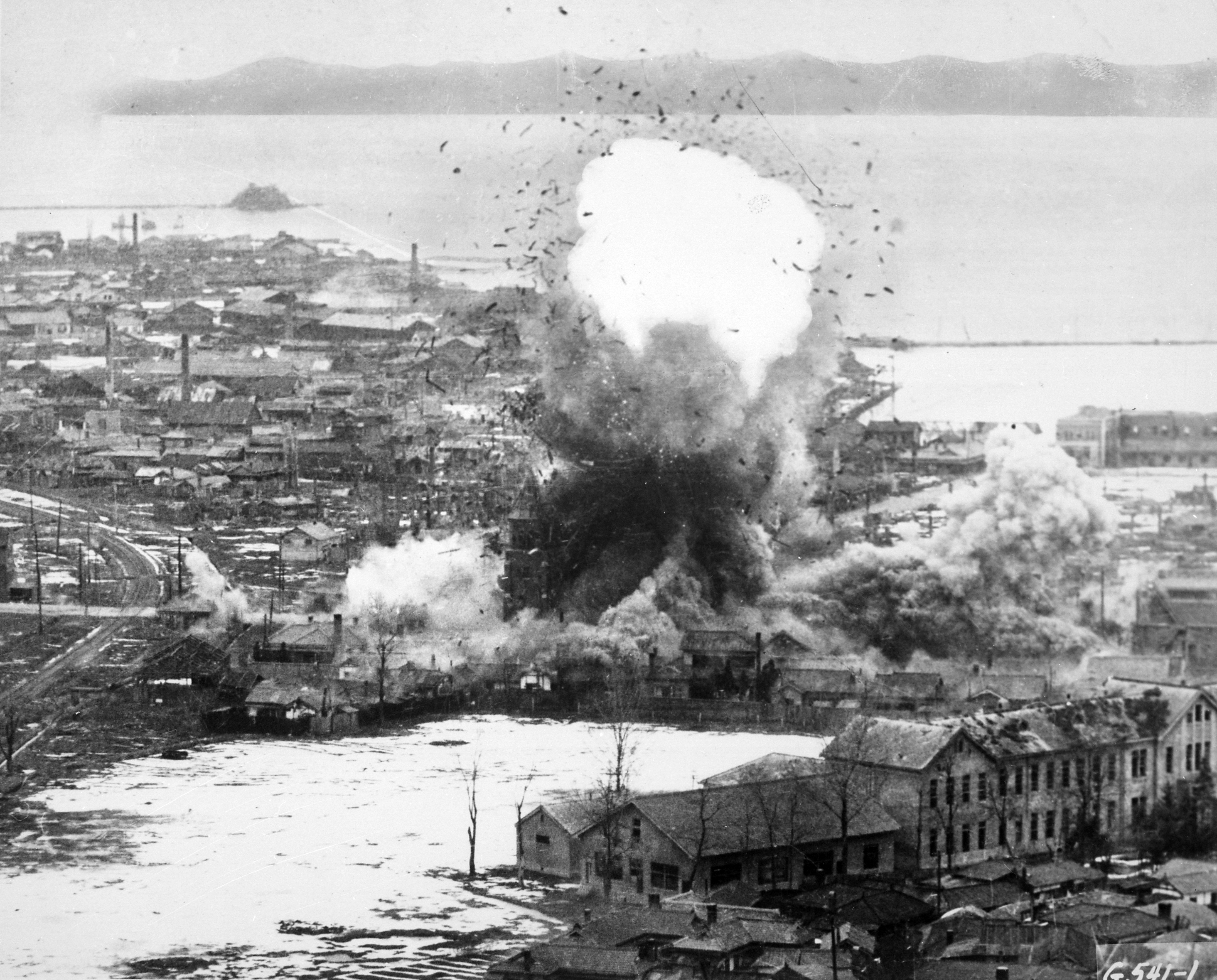
U.S. planes bombing Wonsan, North Korea, 1951

Rather than perceiving the conflict as a civil war, however, the West saw it in Cold War terms as communist aggression, related to recent events in China and Eastern Europe. In September 1950 United Nations Command, led by the U.S., intervened to defend the South, and following the Incheon Landing and breakout from the Pusan Perimeter, rapidly advanced into North Korea. As the UN force neared the border with China, Chinese forces intervened on behalf of North Korea, shifting the balance of the war again. Fighting ended on 27 July 1953, with an armistice that approximately restored the original boundaries between North and South Korea.

Korea was devastated. Around three million civilians and soldiers had been killed. Seoul was in ruins, having changed hands four times. Several million North Korean refugees fled to the South. Almost every substantial building in North Korea had been destroyed. As a result, North Koreans developed a deep-seated antagonism towards the U.S.

== Armistice (27 July 1953) ==
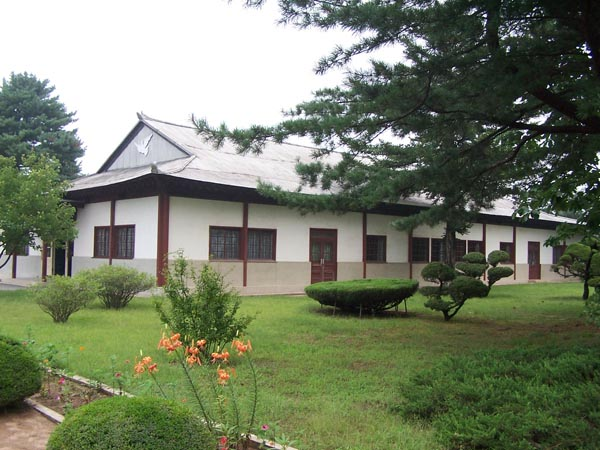
The building in which the armistice was signed, now the North Korea Peace Museum.

Negotiations for an armistice began on 10 July 1951, as the war continued. The main issues were the establishment of a new demarcation line and the exchange of prisoners. After Stalin died, the Soviet Union brokered concessions which led to an agreement on 27 July 1953.

President Syngman Rhee opposed the armistice because it left Korea divided. As negotiations drew to a close, he attempted to sabotage the arrangements for the release of prisoners, and led mass rallies against the armistice. He refused to sign the agreement but reluctantly agreed to abide by it.

The armistice inaugurated an official ceasefire but did not lead to a peace treaty for two Koreas. It established the Korean Demilitarized Zone (DMZ), a buffer zone between the two sides, that intersected the 38th parallel but did not follow it. Despite its name, the border was, and continues to be, one of the most militarized in the world.

North Korea announced that it would no longer abide by the armistice at least six times, in the years 1994, 1996, 2003, 2006, 2009, and 2013.

== Cold War period (1953–1991) ==
After the war, the Chinese forces left, but U.S. forces remained in the South. Sporadic conflict continued. The North's occupation of the South left behind a guerrilla movement that persisted in the Cholla provinces. On 1 October 1953, the United States and South Korea signed a defense treaty. In 1958, the United States stationed nuclear weapons in South Korea. In 1961, North Korea signed mutual defense treaties with the USSR and China. In the Sino-North Korean Mutual Aid and Cooperation Friendship Treaty, China pledged to render immediate military and other assistance by all means to North Korea against any outside attack. During this period, North Korea was described by former CIA director Robert Gates to be the "toughest intelligence target in the world". Alongside the military confrontation, there was a propaganda war, including balloon propaganda campaigns.

The opposing regimes aligned themselves with opposing sides in the Cold War. Both sides received recognition as the legitimate government of Korea from the opposing blocs. South Korea became a strongly anti-Communist military dictatorship. North Korea presented itself as a champion of orthodox Communism, distinct from the Soviet Union and China. The regime developed the doctrine of Juche or self-reliance, which included extreme military mobilization. In response to the threat of nuclear war, it constructed extensive facilities underground and in the mountains. The Pyongyang Metro opened in the 1970s, with the capacity to double as bomb shelter. Until the early 1970s, North Korea was an economic equal of the South.

South Korea was heavily involved in the Vietnam War. Hundreds of North Korean fighter pilots went to Vietnam, shooting down 26 U.S. aircraft. Teams of North Korean psychological warfare specialists targeted South Korean troops, and Vietnamese guerrillas were trained in the North.

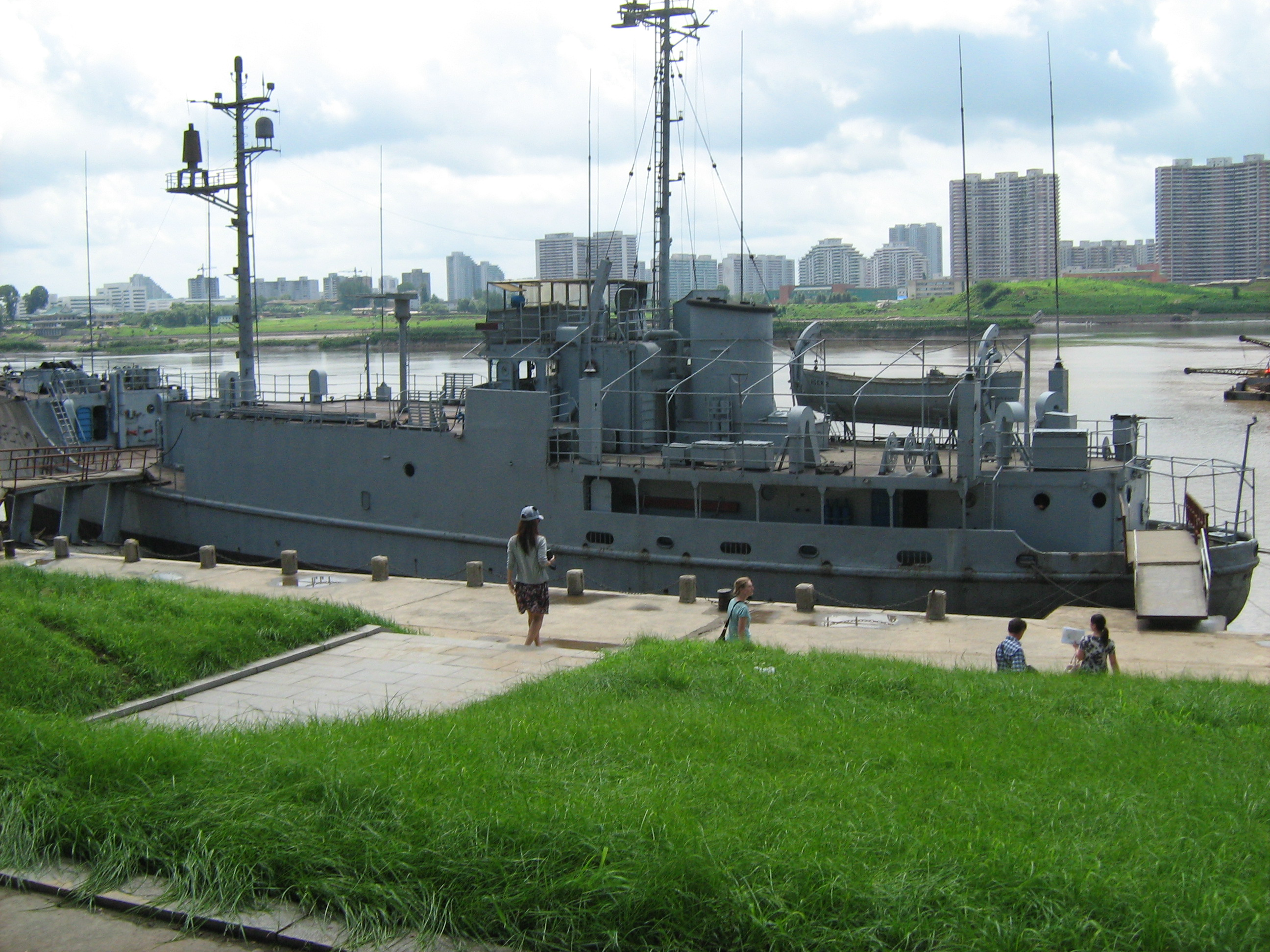
The captured USS Pueblo being visited by tourists in Pyongyang

Tensions between North and South escalated in the late 1960s with a series of low-level armed clashes known as the Korean DMZ Conflict. In 1966, Kim declared "liberation of the south" to be a "national duty". In 1968, North Korean commandos launched the Blue House raid, an unsuccessful attempt to assassinate the South Korean President Park Chung Hee. Shortly after, the American spy ship USS Pueblo was captured by the North Korean navy. The Americans saw the crisis in terms of the global confrontation with Communism, but, rather than orchestrating the incident, the Soviet government was concerned by it. The crisis was initiated by Kim, inspired by Communist successes in the Vietnam War.

In 1967, Korean-born composer Isang Yun was kidnapped in West Germany by South Korean agents and imprisoned in South Korea on the charge of spying for the North. He was released after an international outcry.

In 1969, North Korea shot down a U.S. EC-121 spy plane over the Sea of Japan, killing all 31 crew on board, which constituted the largest single loss of U.S. aircrew during the Cold War. In 1969, Korean Air Lines YS-11 was hijacked and flown to North Korea. Similarly, in 1970, the hijackers of Japan Airlines Flight 351 were given asylum in North Korea. In response to the Blue House raid, the South Korean government set up a special unit to assassinate Kim Il Sung, but the mission was aborted in 1972.

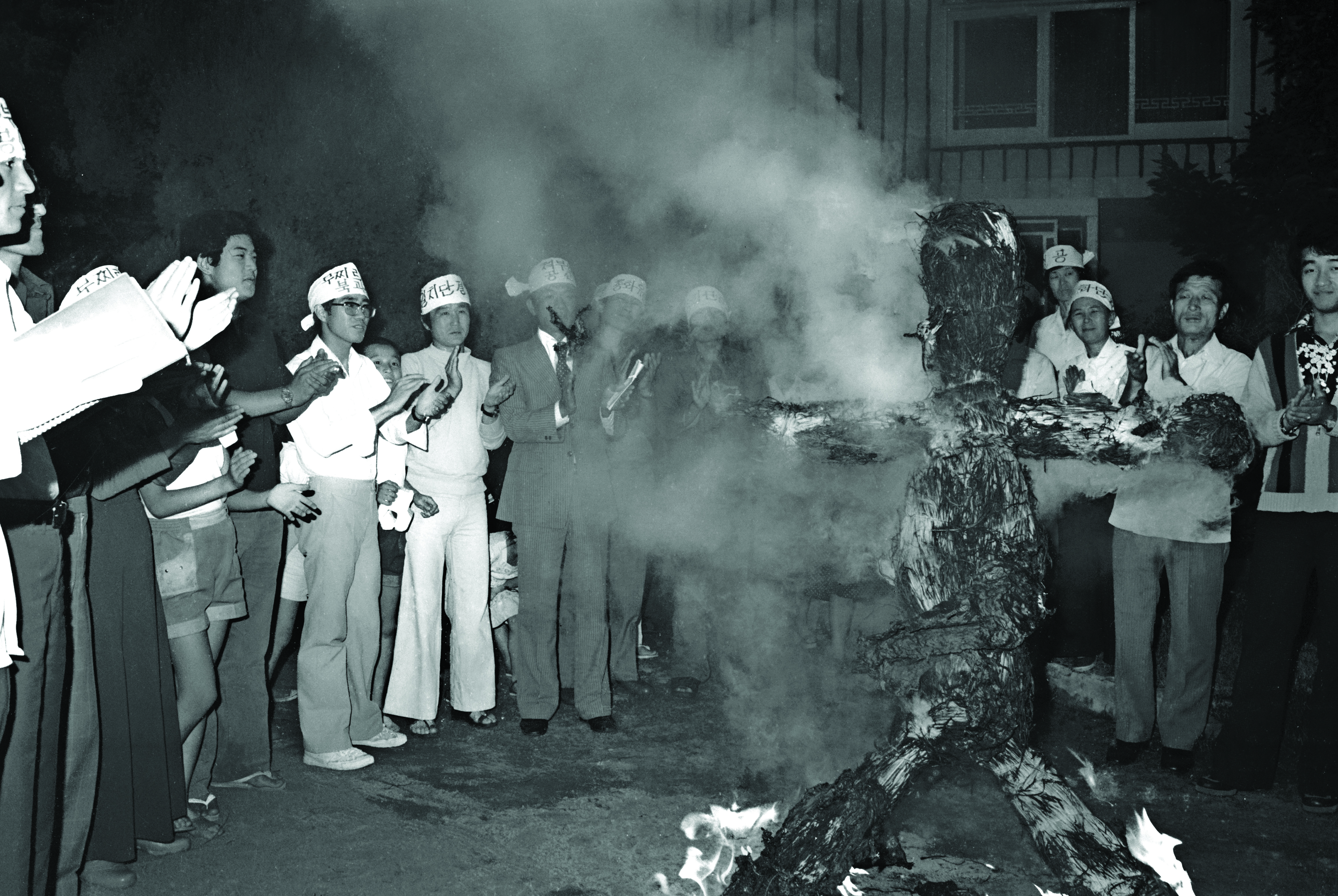
Just after the 1976 Korean axe murder incident, anti-North Korean sentiment spiked in South Korea. In this image, South Koreans burn a paper effigy of North Korean leader Kim Il Sung in Seoul (1976)

In 1974, a North Korean sympathizer attempted to assassinate President Park and killed his wife, Yuk Young-soo. In 1976, the Panmunjeom Axe incident led to the death of two U.S. Army officers in the DMZ and threatened to trigger a wider war. In the 1970s, North Korea kidnapped a number of Japanese citizens.

In 1976, in now-declassified minutes, U.S. Deputy Secretary of Defense William Clements told Henry Kissinger that there had been 200 raids or incursions into North Korea from the South, though not by the U.S. military. According to South Korean politicians who have campaigned for compensation for the survivors, more than 7,700 secret agents infiltrated North Korea from 1953 to 1972, of which about 5,300 are believed not to have returned. Details of only a few of these incursions have become public, including raids by South Korean forces in 1967 that had sabotaged about 50 North Korean facilities. Other missions included targeting advisers from China and the Soviet Union in order to undermine relations between North Korea and its allies.

The East German leader, Erich Honecker, who visited in 1977, was one of Kim Il Sung's closest foreign friends. In 1986, East Germany and North Korea signed an agreement on military co-operation. Kim was also close to maverick Communist leaders, Josip Broz Tito of Yugoslavia, and Nicolae Ceaușescu of Romania. Libyan Leader Muammar Gaddafi met with Kim Il Sung and was a close ally of the DPRK. North Korea began to play a part in the global radical movement, forging ties with such diverse groups as the Black Panther Party of the U.S., the Workers' Party of Ireland, and the African National Congress. As it increasingly emphasized its independence, North Korea began to promote the doctrine of Juche as an alternative to orthodox Marxism-Leninism and as a model for developing countries to follow.

When North-South dialogue started in 1972, North Korea began to receive diplomatic recognition from countries outside the Communist bloc. Within four years, North Korea was recognized by 93 countries, on par with South Korea's recognition by 96 countries. North Korea gained entry into the World Health Organization and, as a result, sent its first permanent observer missions to the UN. In 1975, it joined the Non-Aligned Movement.

During the 1970s, both North and South began building up their military capacity. It was discovered that North Korea had dug tunnels under the DMZ which could accommodate thousands of troops. Alarmed at the prospect of U.S. disengagement, South Korea began a secret nuclear weapons program which was strongly opposed by Washington.

In 1977, U.S. President Jimmy Carter proposed the withdrawal of troops from South Korea. There was a widespread backlash in America and in South Korea, and critics argued that this would allow the North to capture Seoul. Carter postponed the move, and his successor Ronald Reagan reversed the policy, increasing troop numbers to forty-three thousand. After Reagan supplied the South with F-16 fighters, and after Kim Il Sung visited Moscow in 1984, the USSR recommenced military aid and co-operation with the North.

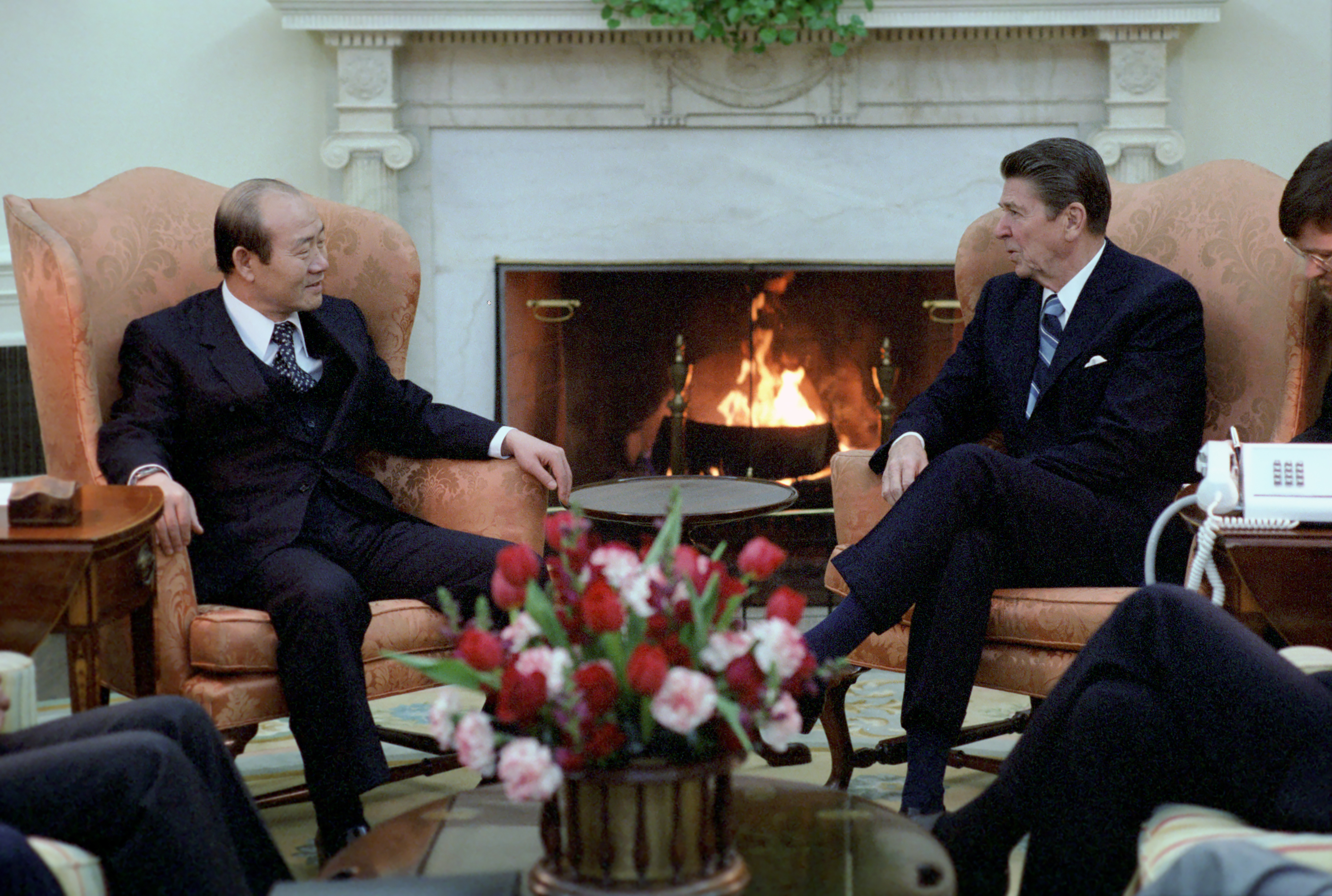
South Korean leader Chun Doo-hwan with US President Ronald Reagan in February 1981

Unrest in South Korea came to a head with the Gwangju Uprising in 1980. The dictatorship equated dissent with North Korean subversion. On the other hand, some young protesters viewed the U.S. as complicit in political repression and identified with the North's nationalist propaganda.

In 1983, North Korea carried out the Rangoon bombing, a failed assassination attempt against South Korean President Chun Doo-hwan while he was visiting Burma. The bombing of Korean Air Flight 858 in 1987, in the lead-up to the Seoul Olympics, led to the U.S. government placing North Korea on its list of terrorist countries. North Korea launched a boycott of the Games, supported by Cuba, Ethiopia, Albania and the Seychelles.

In 1986, former South Korean foreign minister Choe Deok-sin defected to North Korea, becoming a leader of the Chondoist Chongu Party.

In the 1980s, the South Korean government built a 98-metre (322 ft)-tall flagpole in the village of Daeseong-dong in the DMZ. In response, North Korea built a 160-metre (520 ft)-tall flagpole in the nearby village of Kijŏng-dong.

== Isolation and confrontation (1991–2017) ==
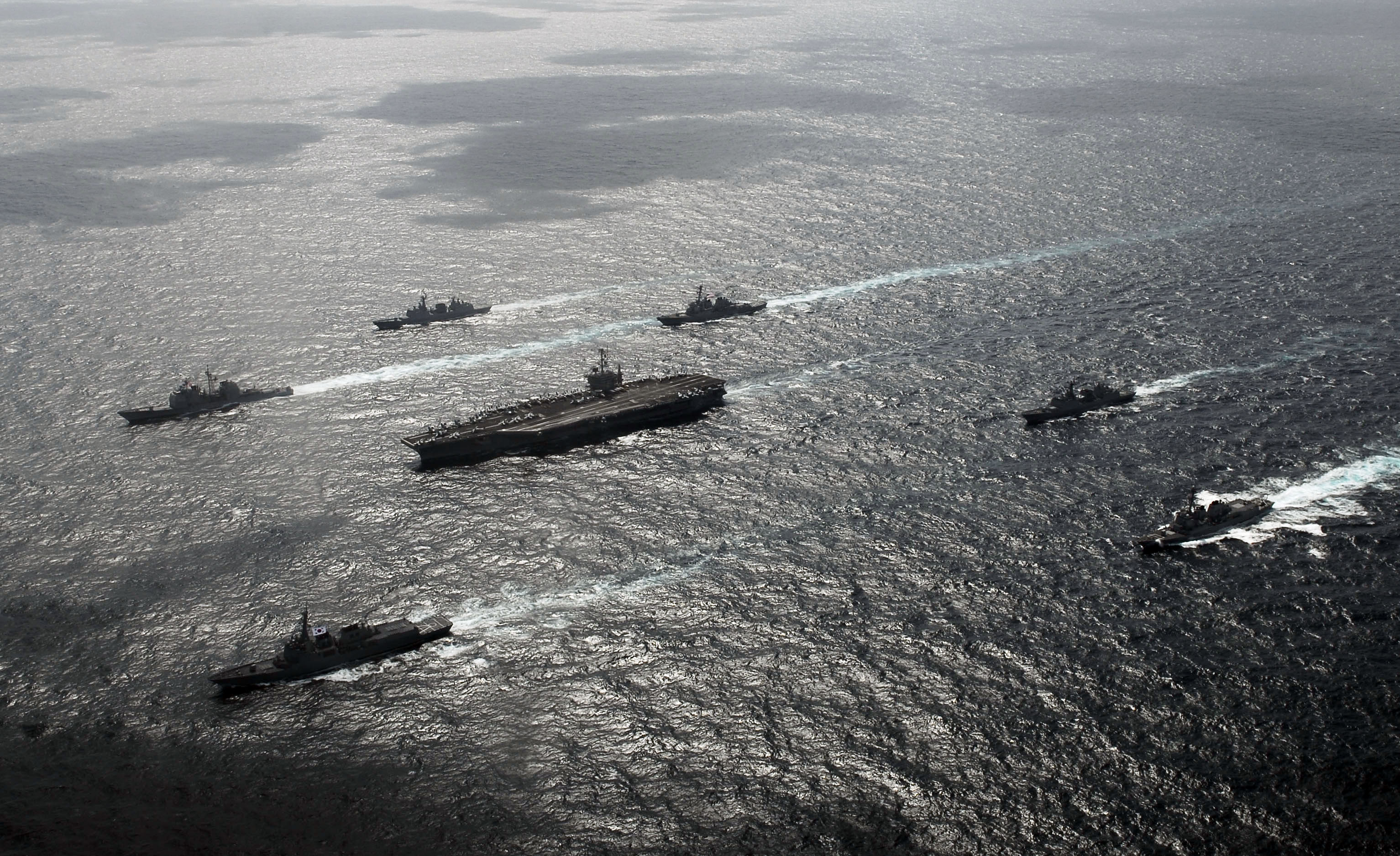
Vessels of U.S. Carrier Strike Group Three sail in formation with ROK Navy ships during Key Resolve/Foal Eagle 2009

As the Cold War ended, North Korea lost the support of the Soviet Union and plunged into an economic crisis. With the death of leader Kim Il Sung in 1994, there were expectations that the North Korean government could collapse and the peninsula would be reunified. US nuclear weapons were removed from South Korea.

In 1994, suspecting that North Korea was developing nuclear weapons, U.S. President Bill Clinton considered bombing North Korea's Yongbyon nuclear reactor, but he later dismissed this option when he was advised that if war broke out, it could cost 52,000 U.S. and 490,000 South Korean military casualties in the first three months, as well as a large number of civilian casualties. Instead, in 1994, the U.S. and North Korea signed an Agreed Framework, which aimed to freeze North Korea's nuclear program. In 1998, South Korean President Kim Dae-jung initiated the Sunshine Policy, which aimed to foster better relations with the North. However, in the aftermath of the September 11 attacks, U.S. President George W. Bush denounced the policy, and in 2002 branded North Korea a member of an "Axis of Evil". Six-party talks involving North and South Korea, the United States, Russia, Japan, and China commenced in 2003 but failed to achieve a resolution. In 2006, North Korea announced it had successfully conducted its first nuclear test. The Sunshine Policy was formally abandoned by South Korean President Lee Myung-bak after his election in 2007.

In the start of the 21st century, it was estimated that the concentration of firepower in the area between Pyongyang and Seoul was greater than that in central Europe during the Cold War. The North's Korean People's Army was numerically twice the size of South Korea's military and had the capacity to devastate Seoul with artillery and missile bombardment. South Korea's military, however, was assessed as being technically superior in many ways. U.S. forces remained in South Korea and carried out annual military exercises with South Korean forces, including Key Resolve, Foal Eagle, and Ulchi-Freedom Guardian. These were routinely denounced by North Korea as acts of aggression. Between 1997 and 2016, the North Korea government accused other governments of declaring war against it 200 times. Analysts have described the U.S. garrison as a tripwire ensuring American military involvement, but some have queried whether sufficient reinforcements would be forthcoming.

During this period, two North Korean submarines were captured after being stranded on the South Korean coast, one near Gangneung in 1996 and one near Sokcho in 1998. In December 1998, the South Korean navy sank a North Korean semi-submersible in the Battle of Yeosu. In 2001, the Japanese Coast Guard sank a North Korean spy ship in the Battle of Amami-Ōshima.

In 1996 South Korean academic Jeong Su-il was unmasked as a North Korea spy. South Korea ceased sending "North Korea Demolition Agents" to raid the North in the early 2000s.

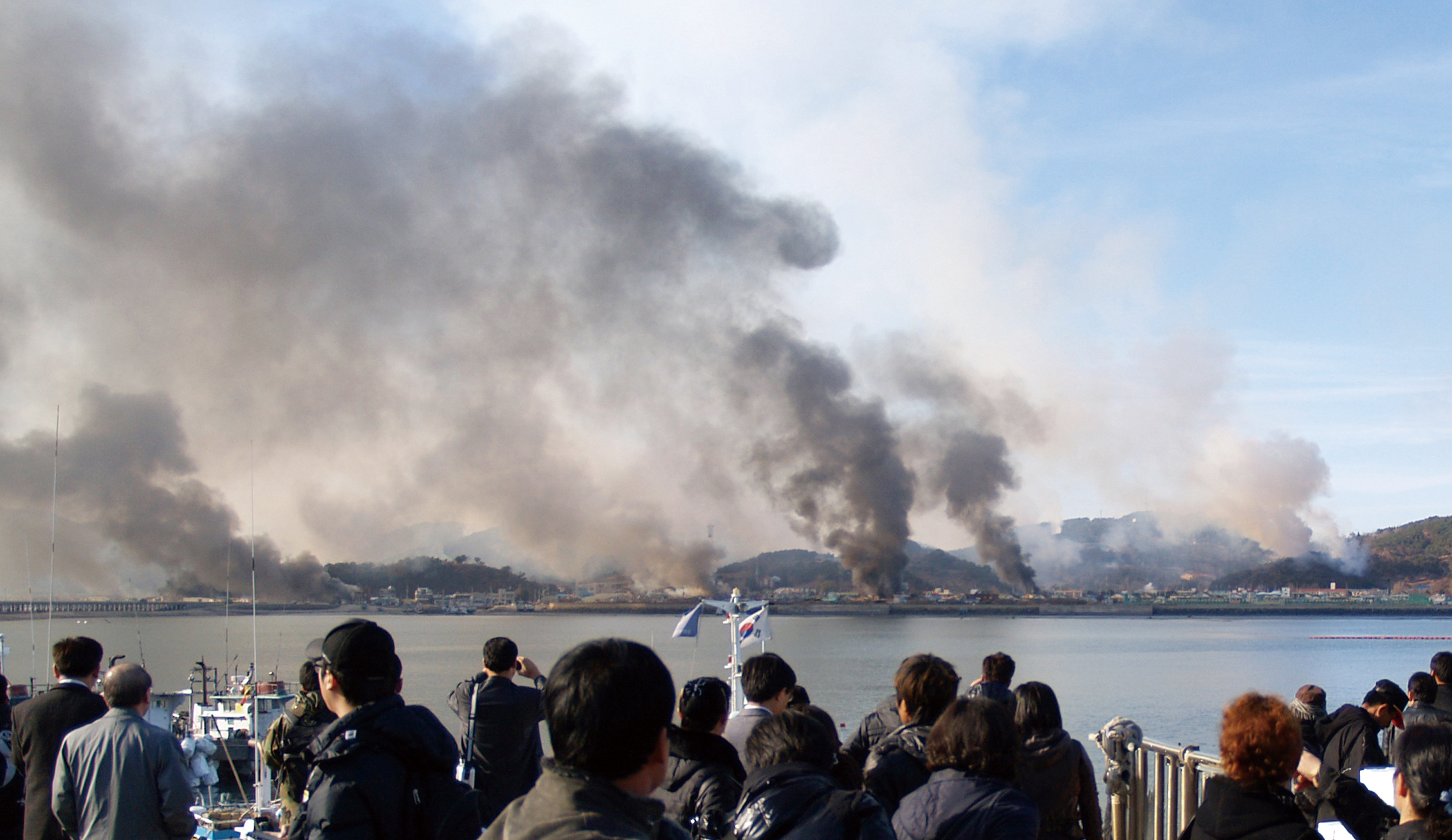
Yeonpyeongdo under North Korean attack

Conflict intensified near the disputed maritime boundary known as the Northern Limit Line in the Yellow Sea. In 1999 and 2002, there were clashes between the navies of North and South Korea, known as the First and Second battle of Yeonpyeong. On 26 March 2010, a South Korean naval vessel, the ROKS Cheonan, sank, near Baengnyeongdo in the Yellow Sea and a North Korean torpedo was blamed. On 23 November 2010, in response to a joint military exercise, North Korea fired artillery at South Korea's Greater Yeonpyeongdo in the Yellow Sea, and South Korea returned fire.

In 2013, amidst tensions about its missile program, North Korea forced the temporary shutdown of the jointly operated Kaesong Industrial Region. The zone was shut again in 2016. A South Korean parliamentarian was convicted of plotting a campaign of sabotage to support the North in 2013 and jailed for 12 years. In 2014, according to the New York Times, U.S. President Barack Obama ordered the intensification of cyber and electronic warfare to disrupt North Korea's missile testing, but this account has been disputed by analysts from the Nautilus Institute.

In 2016, in the face of protests, South Korea decided to deploy the U.S. THAAD anti-missile system in response to nuclear and missile threats by North Korea. After North Korea's fifth nuclear test in September 2016, it was reported that South Korea had developed a plan to raze Pyongyang if there were signs of an impending nuclear attack from the North. A North Korean numbers station started broadcasting again, after a break of 16 years, apparently sending coded messages to agents in the South. As South Korea was convulsed by scandal, North Korea enthusiastically supported the removal of President Park Geun-hye, intensifying leaflet drops. In turn, Park's supporters accused the opposition Liberty Korea Party of basing its logo on Pyongyang's Juche Tower.

In March 2017, it was reported that the South Korean government had increased the rewards to North Korean defectors who brought classified information or military equipment with them. It was also reported that, in 2016, North Korea hackers had stolen classified South Korean military data, including a plan for the killing of Kim Jong Un. According to cybersecurity experts, North Korea maintained an army of hackers trained to disrupt enemy computer networks and steal both money and sensitive data. In the previous decade, it was blamed for numerous cyber-attacks and other hacking attacks in South Korea and elsewhere, including the hack of Sony Pictures supposedly in retaliation for the release of the 2014 film The Interview, which depicts the assassination of Kim Jong Un. The US carried out espionage against North Korea including at least two Navy SEAL operations on its shores in 2005 and 2019.

== Tension and détente (2017–2021) ==
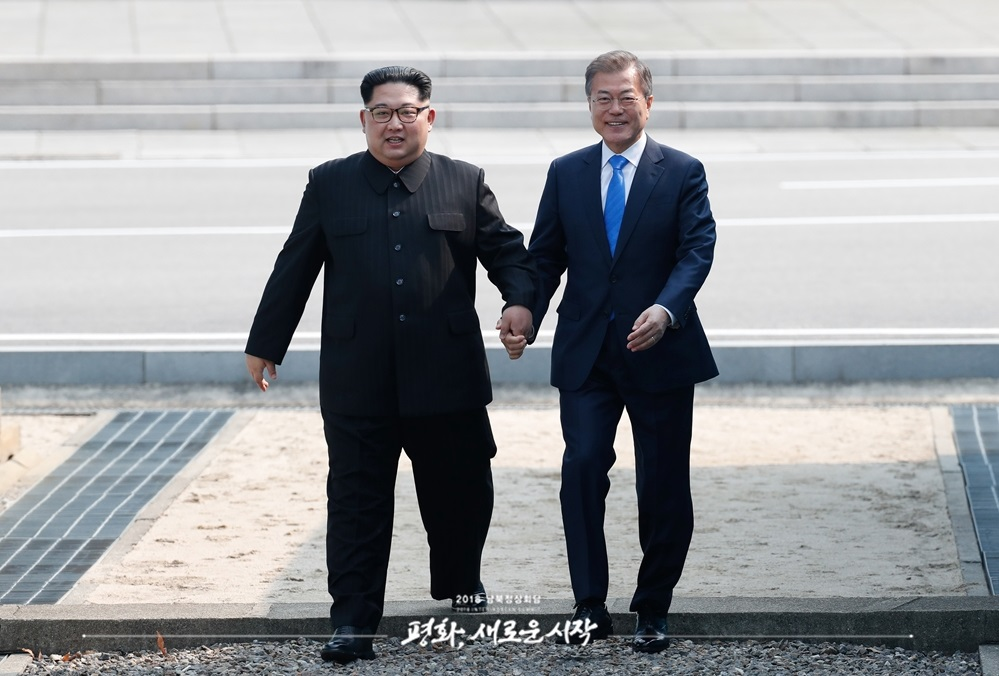
Kim Jong Un and Moon Jae-in cross the Military Demarcation Line during the first 2018 inter-Korean summit

The year 2017 saw a period of heightened tension between the U.S. and North Korea. Early in the year, the incoming U.S. President Donald Trump abandoned the policy of "strategic patience" associated with the preceding Obama administration. Later in the year, Moon Jae-in was elected President of South Korea with a promise to return to the Sunshine Policy. On 4 July 2017, North Korea successfully conducted its first test of an intercontinental ballistic missile (ICBM), named Hwasong-14. It conducted another test on 28 July. On 5 August 2017, the UN imposed further sanctions which were met with defiance from the North Korean government.

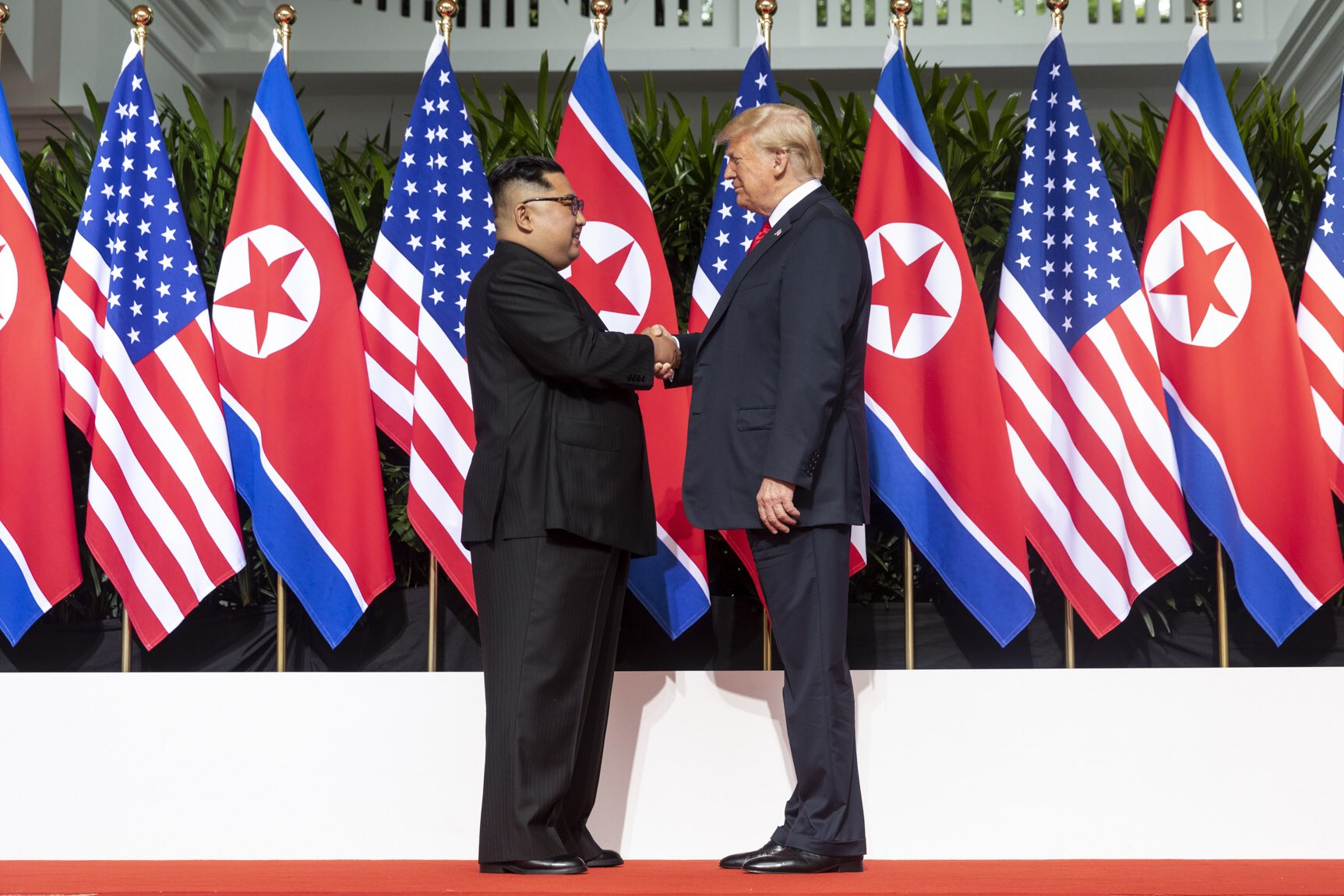
Kim Jong Un and Donald Trump shake hands at the Singapore Summit

Following the sanctions, Trump warned that North Korean nuclear threats "will be met with fire, fury and frankly power, the likes of which the world has never seen before". In response, North Korea announced that it was considering a missile test in which the missiles would land near the U.S. territory of Guam. North Korea conducted its sixth nuclear test on 3 September. The test was met with international condemnation and resulted in further economic sanctions being taken against North Korea. On 28 November, North Korea launched a further missile, which, according to analysts, would be capable of reaching anywhere in the United States. The test resulted in the United Nations placing further sanctions on the country.

In January 2018, the Vancouver Foreign Ministers' Meeting on Security and Stability on Korean Peninsula was co-hosted by Canada and the U.S., regarding ways to increase the effectiveness of the sanctions on North Korea. The co-chairs (Canadian Foreign Minister Freeland and U.S. Secretary of State Tillerson) issued a summary that emphasized the urgency of persuading North Korea to denuclearize and emphasizing the need for sanctions to create conditions for a diplomatic solution.

When Kim Jong Un proposed participating in the 2018 Winter Olympics in South Korea in his New Year's address, the Seoul–Pyongyang hotline was reopened after almost two years. In February, North Korea sent an unprecedented high-level delegation to the Games, headed by Kim Yo Jong, sister of Kim Jong Un, and President Kim Yong-nam, which passed on an invitation to President Moon to visit the North. Kim Jong Un and Moon met at the Joint Security Area on 27 April, where they announced that their governments would work toward a denuclearized Korean Peninsula and formalize peace between North and South Korea. On 12 June, Kim met with Donald Trump at a summit in Singapore and signed a declaration, affirming the same commitment. Trump announced that he would halt military exercises with South Korea and foreshadowed withdrawing American troops entirely.

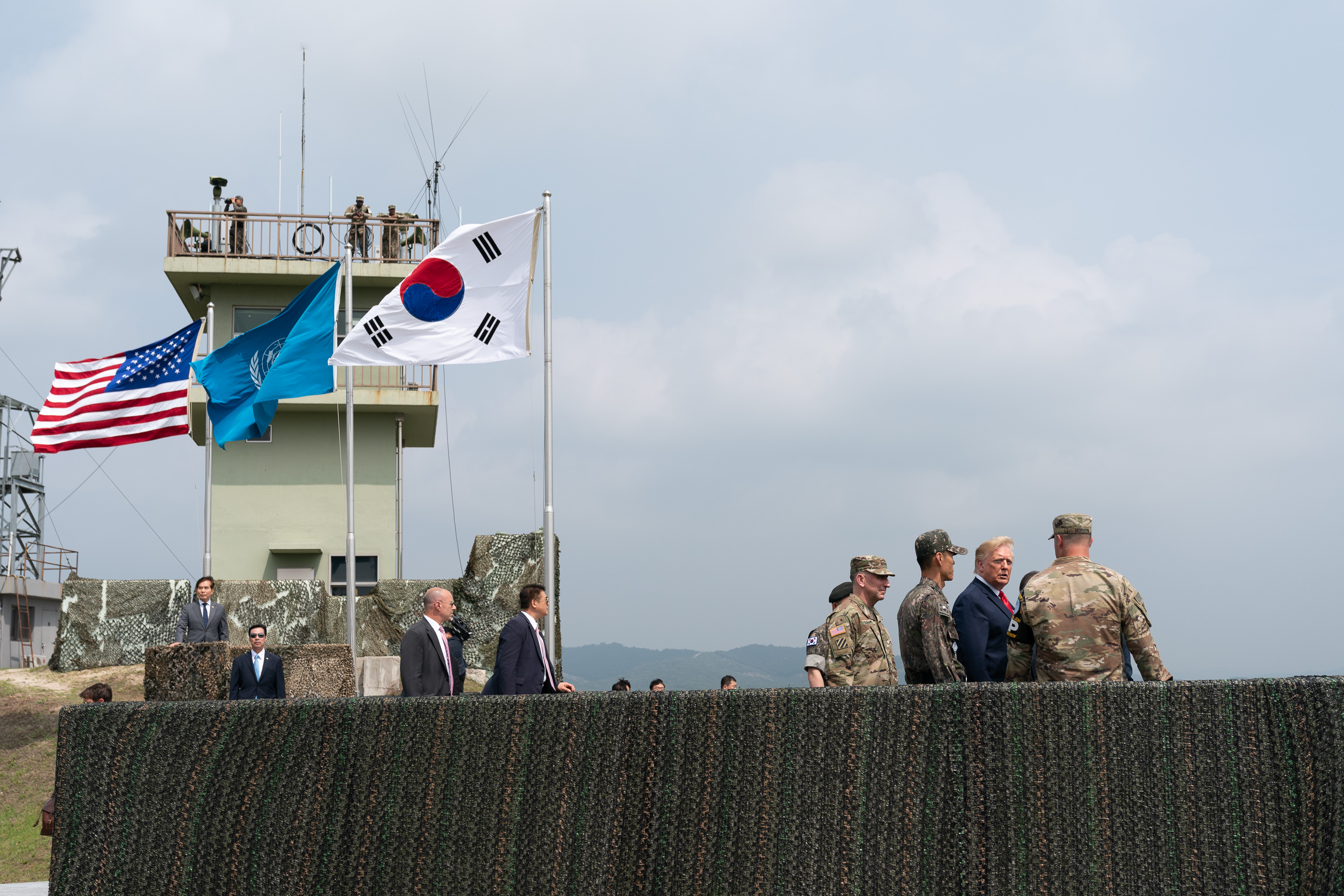
President Donald Trump tours the Korean Demilitarized Zone

In September 2018, at a summit with Moon in Pyongyang, Kim agreed to dismantle North Korea's nuclear weapons facilities if the United States took reciprocal action. The two governments also announced that they would establish buffer zones on their borders to prevent clashes. On 1 November, buffer zones were established across the DMZ to help ensure the end of hostility on land, sea and air. The buffer zones stretched from the north of Deokjeok Island to the south of Cho Island in the West Sea and the north of Sokcho and south of Tongchon County in the East (Yellow) Sea. In addition, no fly zones were established along the DMZ.

In February 2019 in Hanoi, a second summit between Kim and Trump broke down without an agreement. On 30 June 2019, President Trump met with Kim Jong Un along with Moon Jae-in at the DMZ, making him the first sitting U.S. president to enter North Korea. Talks in Stockholm began on 5 October 2019, between U.S. and North Korean negotiating teams, but broke down after one day. On 16 June 2020, the North Korean regime of Kim Jong Un blew up the North-South Joint Liaison Office in the Kaesong Industrial Complex. In late 2021, President Moon, nearing the end of his five-year term, convened a forum, "Declaration of the End of the War: The Limitations and Prospects" continuing to seek a diplomatic breakthrough; but this was opposed by some speakers, including representatives of the People Power Party.

== The end of détente (2021–) ==
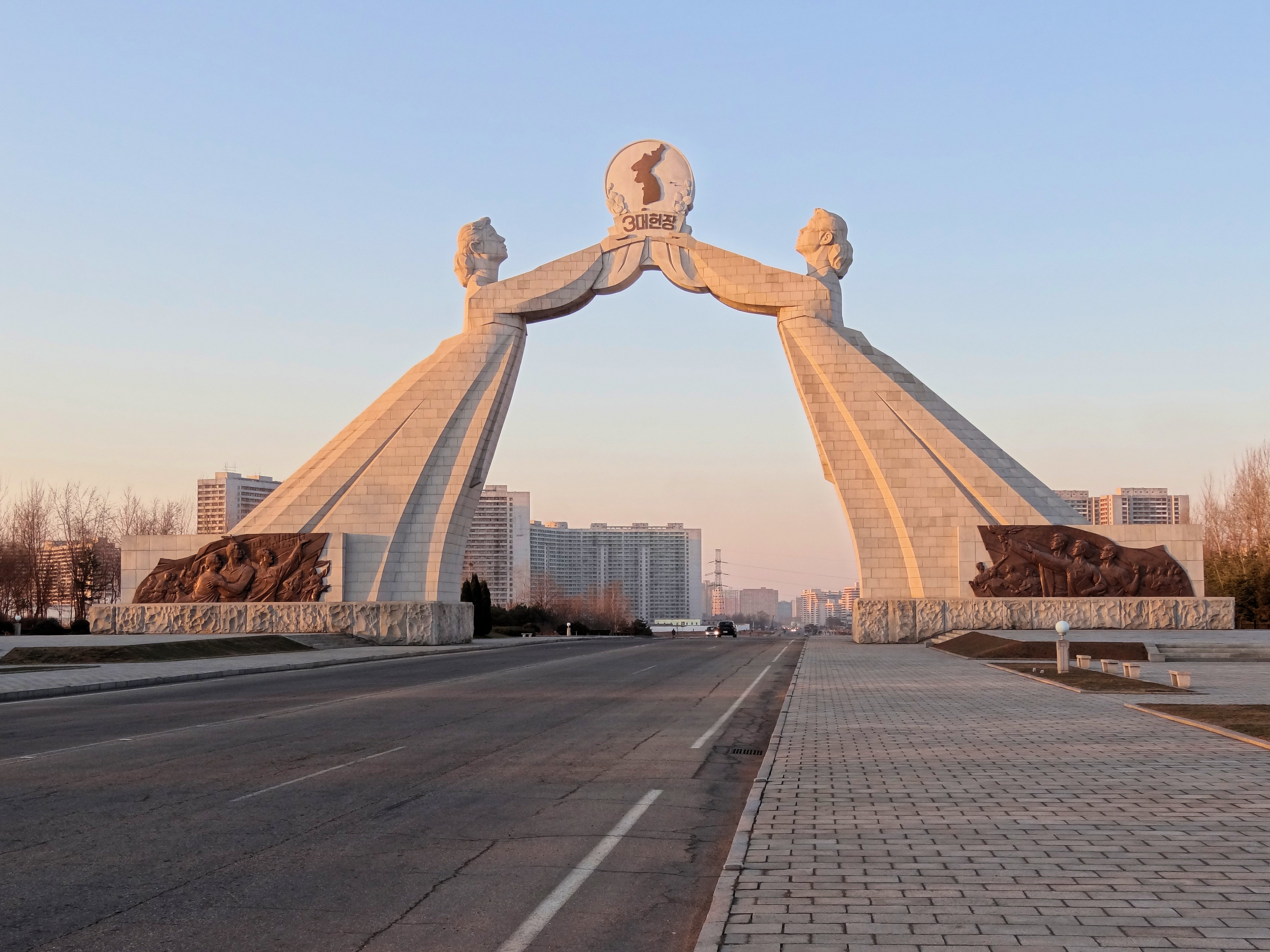
The Arch of Reunification, demolished 2024

On 9 September 2022, North Korea passed a law to declare itself a nuclear weapons state. In November 2022, a U.S.-South Korean air force exercise called Vigilant Storm was countered by missile tests and an air force exercise by North Korea. In December 2022, five North Korean drones entered South Korean airspace, eluding South Korean defences, one entering the no-fly zone around the Blue House. In late 2022, the South Korean National Intelligence Service began a series of raids targeting alleged North Korean spy-cells.

As of 2023, North Korean publications remained censored in South Korea. Meanwhile, North Korea campaigned against foreign culture, while the US government sponsored the flow of outside information into North Korea.

On 5 January 2024, North Korea fired 200 shells towards Yeonpyeongdo.

On 10 January 2024, during a speech to the Central Committee of the Workers' Party of Korea, Kim Jong Un called for a "fundamental turnabout" in North Korea's stance towards South Korea, calling the South the "enemy". He stated "the party's comprehensive conclusion after reviewing decades-long inter-Korean relations is that reunification can never be achieved with those ROK riffraffs that defined the 'unification by absorption' and 'unification under liberal democracy' as their state policy", which he said is in "sharp contradiction with what our line of national reunification was: one nation, one state with two systems". Kim cited South Korean constitution's claims over the entire Korean Peninsula and South Korean President Yoon Suk Yeol's policy towards the north as evidence that South Korea is an unsuitable partner for reunification. He said the relations between the two Koreas currently were "states hostile to each other and the relations between two belligerent states" and no longer ones that are "consanguineous or homogeneous", continuing by saying it is "unsuitable" to discuss the issue of reunification "with this strange clan [South Korea], who is no more than a colonial stooge of the U.S. despite the rhetorical word [we used to use] — 'the fellow countrymen'". Kim further confirmed a shift in policy in January 2024, when he gave a speech to the Supreme People's Assembly (SPA) calling for the constitution to be amended to remove references to cooperation and reunification, as well as specify DPRK's territorial borders and add an article specifying the ROK as the most hostile country. He also rejected the maritime Northern Limit Line, saying that "If the Republic of Korea invades our ground territory, territorial air space, or territorial waters by even 0.001 mm, it will be considered a provocation of war". The SPA also voted on the abolition of three inter-Korean cooperation organizations; the Committee for the Peaceful Reunification of the Fatherland, the Korean People's Cooperation Administration, and the Kumgangsan International Tourism Administration.

South Korean President Yoon Suk Yeol with US President Joe Biden in the Oval Office, April 2023

One of the symbols of this was the destruction of the Arch of Reunification in Pyongyang on 23 January 2024. Kim Jong Un said at the 10th session of the 14th Supreme People's Assembly of the Democratic People's Republic of Korea: "We should also take steps such as the demolition of the "Monument to the Three Charters of National Reunification" which stands unceremoniously at the southern entrance to the capital, Pyongyang, in order to eliminate the very concepts of "reunification", "reconciliation" and "fratricidal" national history of the DPRK." On 19 February 2024, North Korea erased an image of the Korean Peninsula, viewed as a unification reference, from its major websites.

On 1 March 2024, the government of President Yoon Suk Yeol plans to develop a new vision of unification with North Korea to include the principle of liberal democracy. South Korea plans to update its vision of unification for the first time in 30 years. This is the first revision of the Unification Formula of the national community, South Korea's unification policy unveiled in August 1994 under the administration of late President Kim Young-sam.

In October 2024, North Korea claimed that 1.4 million people enlisted after accusing South Korea of drone incursions. In response, Seoul restricted leaflet activities near the border to prevent further escalation.

North Korea's revised constitution now defines South Korea as a "hostile state," ending its pursuit of peaceful reunification and increasing military fortifications along the border. At the same time, North Korea blew up road and rail links with South Korea in certain areas between the Korean borders.

On 3 December 2024, President Yoon declared martial law in South Korea. He justified this by accusing lawmakers of being pro-North Korea; however, Yoon lifted martial law after the National Assembly passed an emergency motion nullifying the declaration several hours after Yoon's speech.

In December 2025, South Korea eased restrictions on access to North Korean media, long banned under the National Security Act.

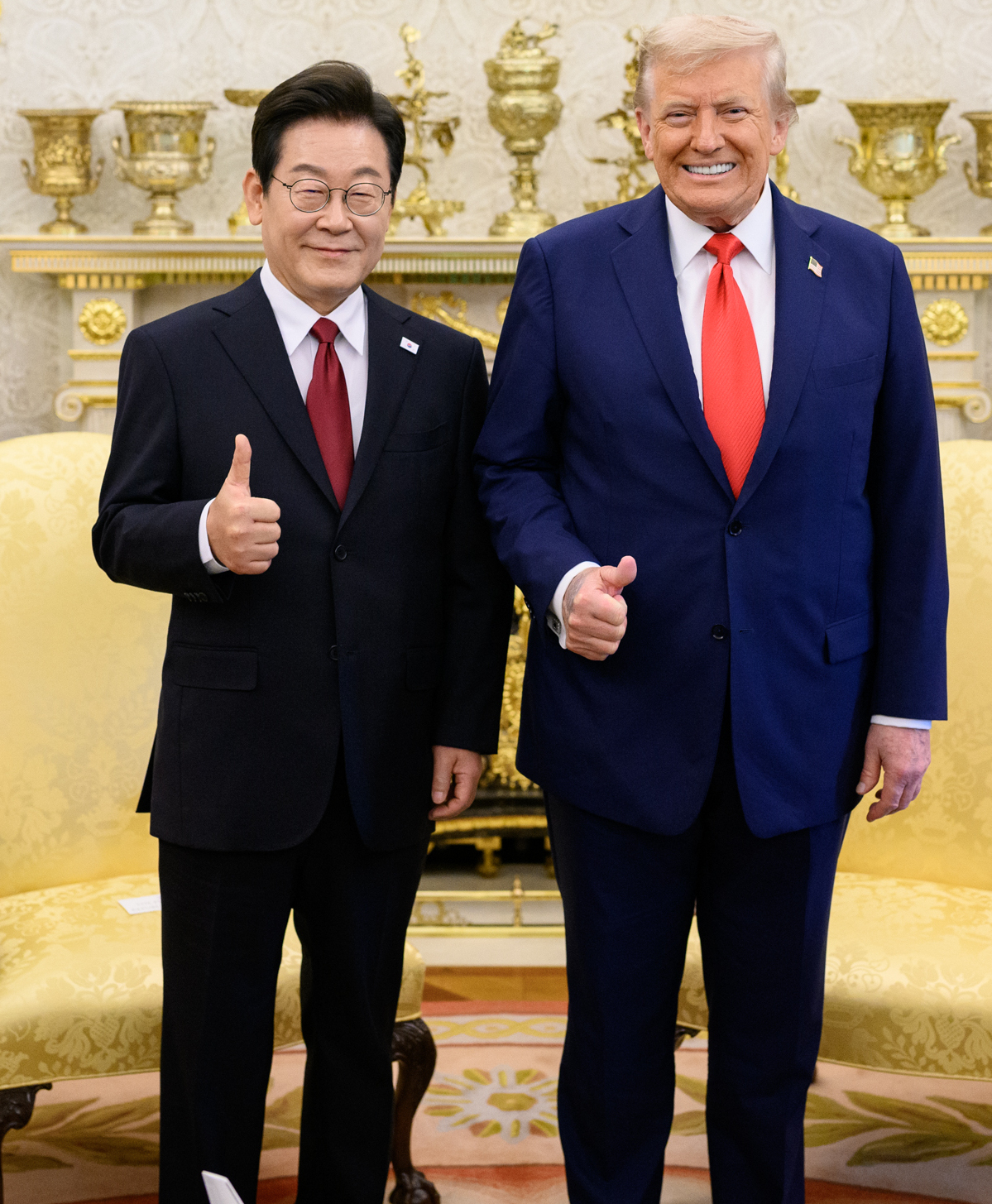
South Korean President Lee Jae-myung with US President Donald Trump in the Oval Office, August 2025

North and South Korea exchanged accusations after a landmine blast in the DMZ in September 2026.

== See also ==
- Cold War in Asia
- History of North Korea
- History of South Korea
- Korean reunification
- List of border incidents involving North and South Korea
- North Korea–South Korea relations
