= Vancouver Foreign Ministers' Meeting on Security and Stability on Korean Peninsula =

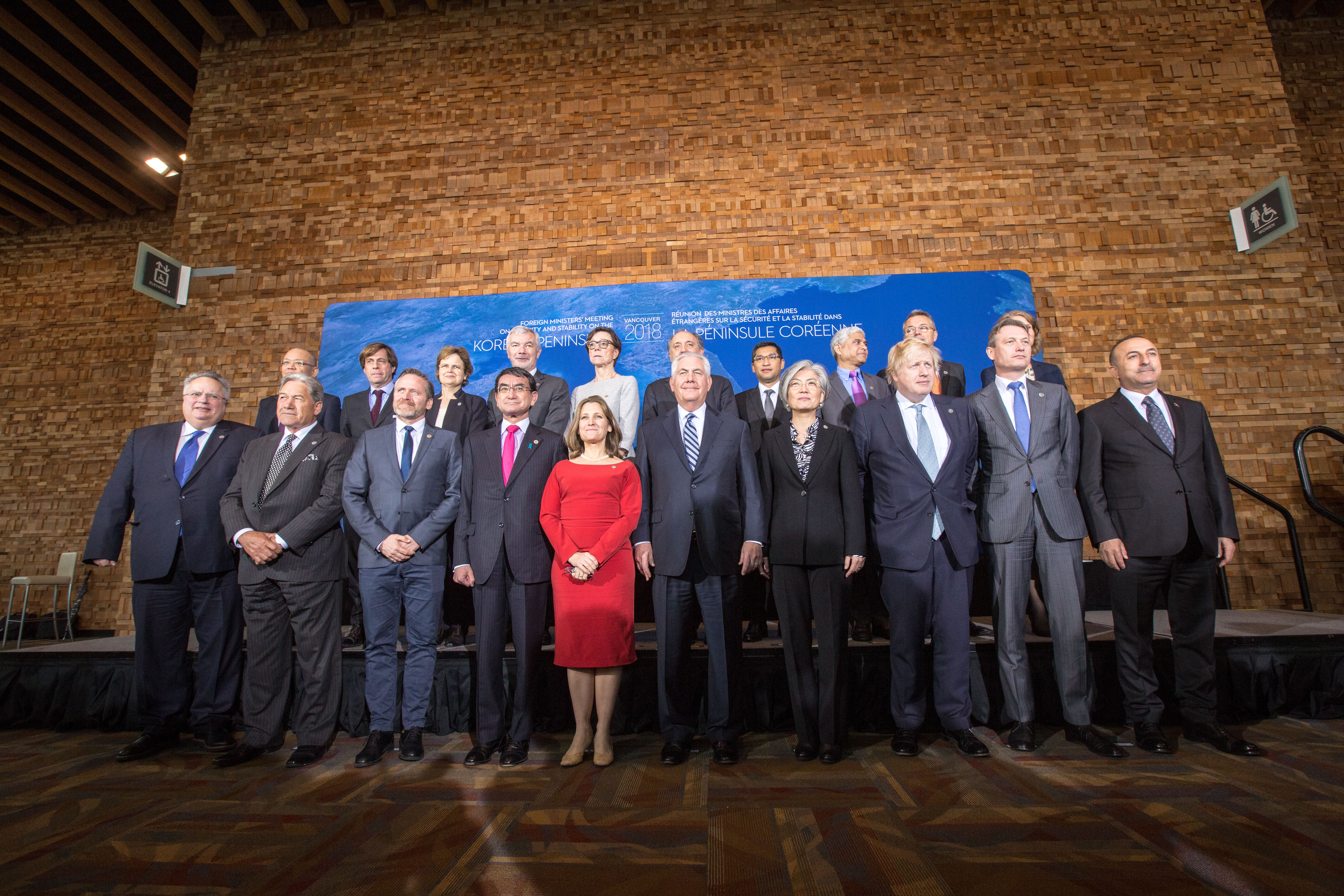
- Host country: co-hosts Canada & USA
- Date: January 16, 2018
- Cities: Vancouver, Canada
- Participants: 20 nations
- Chair: co-chairs Chrystia Freeland & Rex Tillerson

Key points
- Sanctions against North Korea

The Vancouver Foreign Ministers’ Meeting on Security and Stability on Korean Peninsula was held on January 16, 2018 in Vancouver, Canada. The meeting was to allow "foreign ministers to discuss ways to increase the effectiveness of the global sanctions regime in support of a rules-based international order."

== Background ==
The meeting was announced after North Korea tested its latest long range intercontinental ballistic missile in late November, but was held amid signs that tensions on the Korean peninsula easing with North and South Korea holding formal talks in January for the first time in two years and North Korea agreeing to participate in the 2018 Winter Olympics in a unified team with the South.

== Meeting ==
The meeting was co-hosted by Canada and the USA.

Invited parties include: "South Korea, Japan, India, Britain, France and other countries who fought in the Korean War of 1950-53." with foreign ministers and senior officials from 20 nations actually attending the meeting.

Notable countries that had not been invited were China, North Korea and Russia. China and Russia criticized the gathering as potentially harmful to peace prospects on the Korean peninsula, with China calling out the meeting for representing a "Cold War mentality". Diplomats said China's absence would limit what could be achieved.

== See also ==
- 2017–18 North Korea crisis
- 2017 North Korean missile tests
- 2017 North Korean nuclear test
- Korean conflict
- List of North Korean missile tests
