= Yugo-class submarine =

North Korean midget submarine class

Class overview
- Name: Yugo class
- Builders: Yukdaeso-ri shipyard
- Operators: See Operators
- Succeeded by: Sang-O class
- In commission: Late 1960s
- Completed: 8
- Active: 4
- Lost: 3
- Retired: 1

General characteristics
- Type: Midget submarine
- Displacement: 90 up to 110 tons (submerged)
- Length: 20 m (65 ft 7 in)
- Beam: 2 m (6 ft 7 in)
- Propulsion: Single-shaft MTU diesel engine
- Speed: 10 knots (19 km/h; 12 mph) surfaced; 4 knots (7.4 km/h; 4.6 mph) submerged
- Capacity: 4–6 special forces troops
- Armament: Some armed with two 533 mm (21 in) torpedoes, possibly in drop collars.
- Notes: First successful indigenous midget submarine

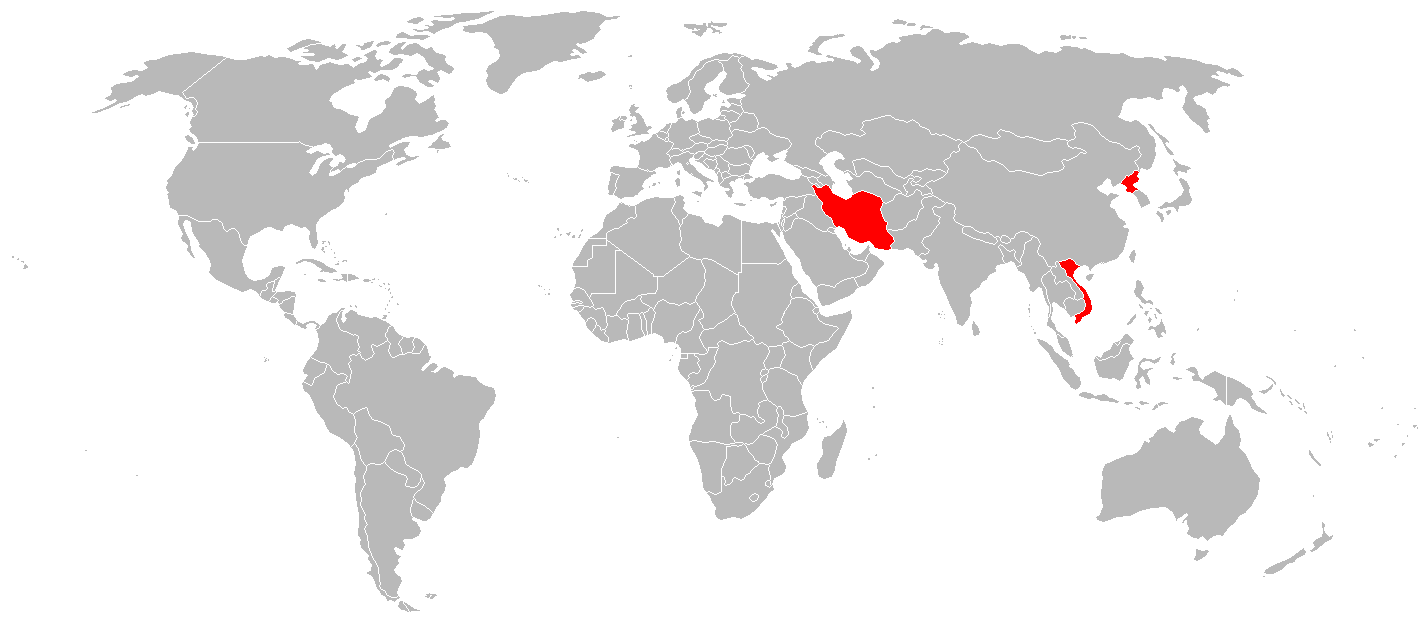
Countries which use Yugo-class submarines

The Yugo-class submarine is a class of four midget submarines used primarily for infiltration and espionage by North Korea. The Yugo class was given its name because it was built to plans supplied to North Korea by Yugoslavia in 1965.

== Design ==
The Yugo class is a family of midget submarines that are not all identical. The displacement is either the standard 90 tons of the original Yugoslavian design for the early units or 110 tons for the later units. Armament is either a pair of 400 mm (16 in) torpedo tubes (early units) or a pair of 533 mm (21 in) short torpedo tubes (later units).

All units have the same range: 550 nautical miles (1,020 km; 630 mi) at 10 knots (19 km/h; 12 mph) on the surface and 50 nautical miles (93 km; 58 mi) at 4 knots (7.4 km/h; 4.6 mph) submerged.

== History ==
The final vessel was built in the 1980s, after which they were superseded by the Sang-O-class submarines. On 12 June 1998, one out of six submarines was captured by the South Koreans.

In the early 2000s, Vietnam "gained experience" with these craft prior to ordering Russian Kilo-class diesel-electric submarines for denial of area capabilities, specifically against China's fleet per the Foreign Policy Research Institute.

In March 2016, it was announced that the North Korean Navy had lost one of the ships during exercises.

== Operators ==
- North Korea
- Vietnam:
  - 2 submarines in service of Vietnam People's Navy
  - Purchased in 1997. These were used by Vietnam People's Navy for swimmer delivery operations aside from conventional submarine operations. The purchase was done by bartering. Kim Jong-il personally approved of the delivery to make amends for not paying Vietnam for purchasing 20,000 tons of rice.
- Cuba
  - Classified as a 'Delfin-class submarine' and is rumored to have either been built in North Korea or locally assembled in Cuba with North Korean assistance.

== See also ==
- Una-class submarine, Yugoslav midget submarines
- Ghadir-class submarine, Iranian derivative
