= Sang-O-class submarine =

1991 class of North Korean Navy submarines

Sang-O class
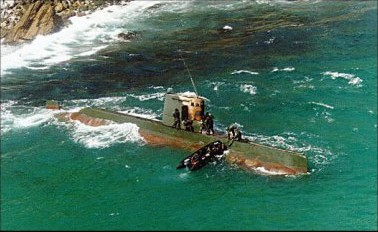
- Submarine involved in the 1996 incident

Class overview
- Builders: Bong Dao Bo Shipyards, Singpo
- Operators: Korean People's Navy
- Preceded by: Yugo class
- Succeeded by: Sinpo class
- Subclasses: Attack version, infiltration/reconnaissance version
- In commission: 1991
- Completed: 41+
- Active: 40 (February 2021)
- Lost: 1 captured by South Korea
- Preserved: 1

General characteristics (Sang-O I armed version)
- Type: Coastal submarine
- Displacement: 275 tons (surfaced); 370 tons (submerged)
- Length: 34 m (111 ft 7 in)
- Beam: 3.8 m (12 ft 6 in)
- Propulsion: Diesel-electric: 1 small diesel, 1 electric motor, 1 shaft
- Speed: 7.5 knots (13.9 km/h; 8.6 mph) surfaced; 9 knots (17 km/h; 10 mph) submerged
- Range: 1,500 nmi (2,800 km; 1,700 mi)
- Test depth: 150 m (490 ft), capable of bottoming
- Capacity: 0 (10/11 in recce version)
- Complement: 15
- Sensors & processing systems: Radar; Civilian Furuno I-band radar; Passive RWR/ESM/SIGINT; Golf Ball radar; Snoop Plate radar; Sonar; Trout Cheek sonar
- Armament: 4 × 533 mm (21 in) torpedo tubes fitted with Russian 53-65KE torpedoes; Capable of minelaying
- Notes: Fitted with a snorkel

The Sang-O-class ('Shark' class) of submarines (Hangul: 상어급 잠수함) are diesel-electric coastal submarines in service with the Korean People's Navy, the navy of North Korea. They are the country's second largest indigenously-built submarines.

Though North Korean military capabilities are mostly kept classified, it was reported that North Korea maintains 40 Sang-O-class submarines as of February 2021.

== History ==
The Sang-O class was introduced in 1991, produced at Bong Dao Bo Shipyards in Sinpo.

A single unit was captured by the Republic of Korea Navy (South Korea) after it ran aground on 18 September 1996 in the Gangneung submarine infiltration incident.

The seized Sang-O-class submarine was placed on display at Unification Park near Gangneung, which was opened on 26 September 2001.

== Design ==
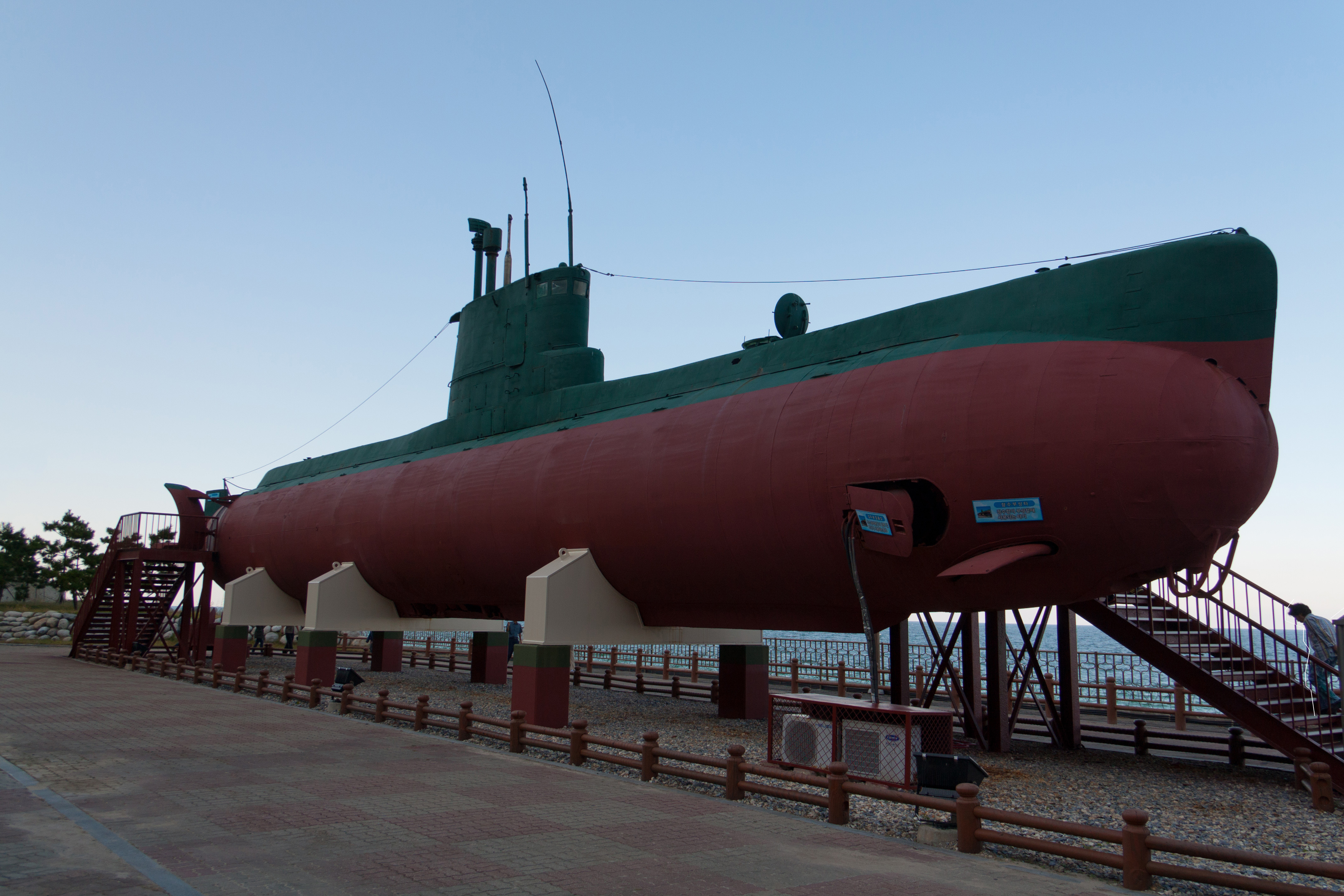
A Sang-O-class submarine captured by South Korea on display at Tongil (Unification) Park near Gangneung in 2012

The Sang-O class was reported to be larger than a midget submarine, but smaller than the Romeo and Whiskey-class submarines. They are usually equipped with four 533 mm (21 in) torpedo tubes and 16 mines, but some are unarmed and are used to carry North Korean commandos.

=== New class ===
It was reported in March 2011 that a new version of the Sang-O class had been deployed in North Korea. Satellite imagery from 2005 suggests the Sang-O II / K-300 may have been produced at the Mayang-do naval base and fitted out at the dry docks located at 39.9978 N, and 128.20019 E.

Other footage of the nearby docks of Sinp'o appear to depict the Sang-O II / K-300 as early as 2004 (at 40 01'31.20"N 128 09'55.80"E). Subsequent satellite imagery shows the Sang-O II / K-300 deployed to the Ch’aho-rodongjagu submarine Navy Base at 40.205441 N 128.649524 E on North Korea's east coast.

According to the KPA Journal, the decision to develop a larger, improved version of the Sang-O came in the late 1990s or early 2000. The Sang-O II / K-300 is a stretched version of the original Sang-O class with an approximate length of 39 to 40 metres and a corresponding surface displacement of approximately 300 to 340 tons.

The increased length and internal volume would suggest an increase in the operational range of the submarine and troop/equipment carrying capabilities. Top speed is also reported to be higher in the new model, meaning an improved propulsion system is possibly housed in some of the extra length.
