= 2019 SEAL Team Six operation in North Korea =

Failed U.S. military operation

SEAL Team Six operation in North Korea
- Objective: Plant covert listening device
- Date: c. February 2019; 7 years ago (Korea Standard Time)
- Executed by: Naval Special Warfare Development Group (Seal Team Six): Red Squadron
- Outcome: Mission aborted after being detected by a North Korean boat
- Casualties: (North Korea) 2–3 civilians

In early 2019, the United States conducted an operation in which SEAL Team Six attempted to plant a covert listening device to intercept North Korean communications regarding the ongoing high-level nuclear talks between Supreme Leader Kim Jong Un and U.S. president Donald Trump. The operation failed when the team encountered a small boat (carrying shellfishermen) and opened fire on it, blowing their cover.

The operation was publicly revealed by The New York Times on September 5, 2025. The same article also revealed the existence of a 2005 Navy SEAL operation that went ashore in North Korea.

== Course of operation ==
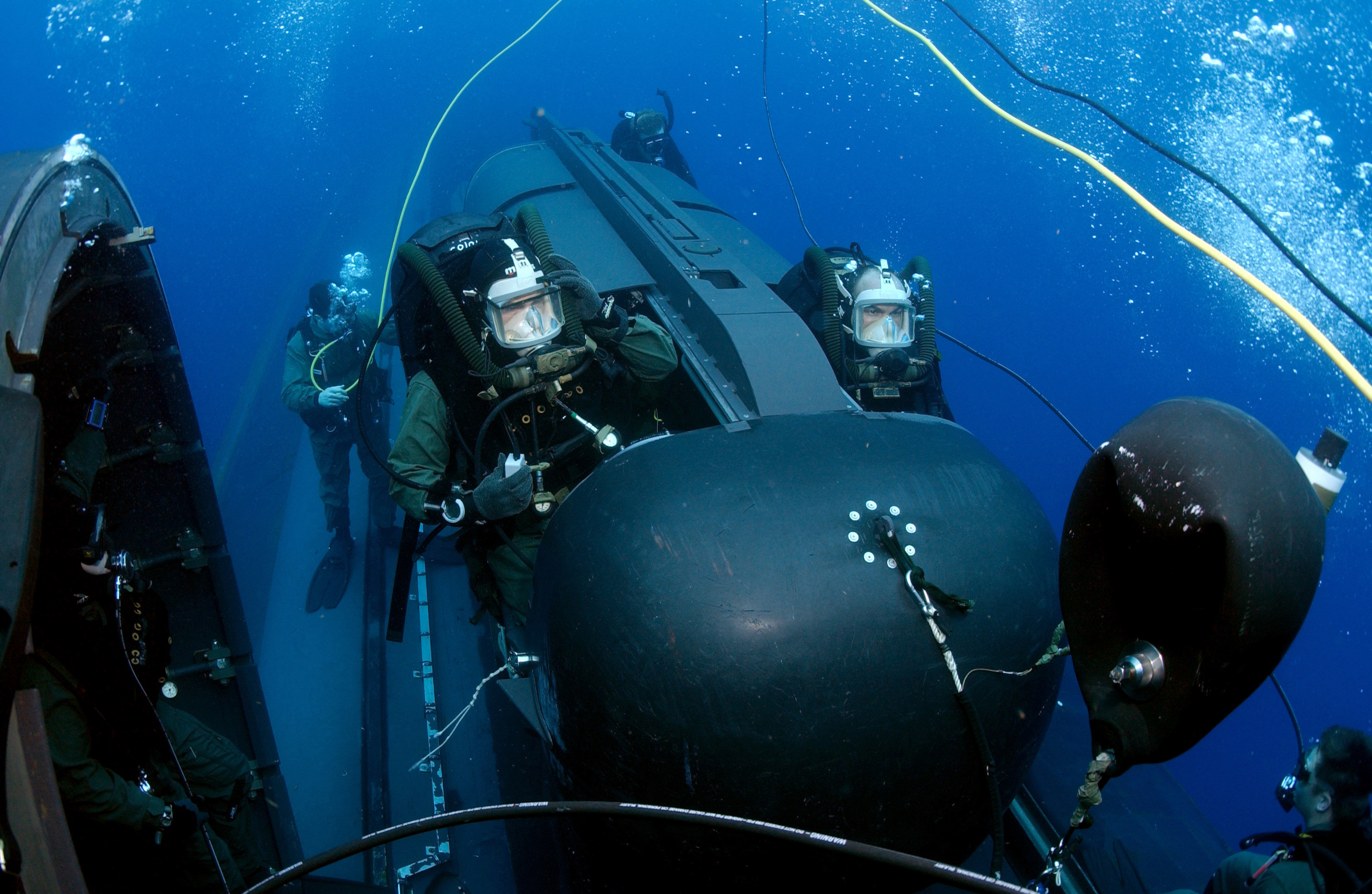
A SEAL Delivery Vehicle similar to the one used in the operation

Part of the SEAL team reached shore, however the operation failed when the rest of the team still in their mini-subs encountered a small North Korean boat that started moving towards them. The unknown boat's lights swept over the water, and a man from the boat "splashed into the sea."

The SEAL team opened fire on the North Korean boat, blowing the operation's cover. The SEAL team swam from shore to the North Korean boat and boarded to ensure there were no survivors. The team found no uniforms, weapons, or other evidence the people on the boat were affiliated with the North Korean military; they appeared to be civilians diving for shellfish. Wishing to hide evidence of the operation from the North Korean government, the SEAL team threw the bodies into the sea after puncturing their lungs to ensure they sank.

The operation was aborted after concerns that the gunshot sounds may have alerted other civilians or security forces in the nearby area. This resulted in the listening device not being planted and an immediate return to a US base in South Korea.

== Reactions ==
Matthew Waxman, a law professor and former national security official in the George W. Bush administration, stated that the Trump administration may have broken the law by failing to notify Congress of the failed mission.

In 2021, the Biden administration's secretary of defense, Lloyd Austin, ordered an investigation into the mission, conducted by the Inspector General of the United States Army, either Leslie C. Smith or Donna W. Martin. Key members of Congress, possibly the Gang of Eight, were briefed on the investigation results.

Trump denied knowledge of the mission at an Oval Office meeting in 2025.

== See also ==
- List of operations conducted by SEAL Team Six
- List of border incidents involving North and South Korea
