= 1998 Yosu submersible incident =

1998 naval skirmish between North Korea and South Korea

- Part of Korean Conflict
Date	17–18 December 1998
Location	Off the coast of Yosu, South Jeolla Province, South Korea
Result	South Korean victory

Belligerents
South Korea	North Korea

Strength
2 Pohang-class corvettes	1 semi-submersible

Casualties and losses
None	1 semi-submersible sunk ~4 dead

The 1998 Yosu submersible incident was a naval skirmish that occurred off of the southern coast of South Korea between 17 and 18 December 1998. On the evening of 17 December, a South Korean observation post sighted a North Korean semi-submersible naval vessel in the vicinity of the city of Yosu. The semi-submersible was discovered and sunk during a subsequent search and skirmish on the morning of 18 December.

== Background ==
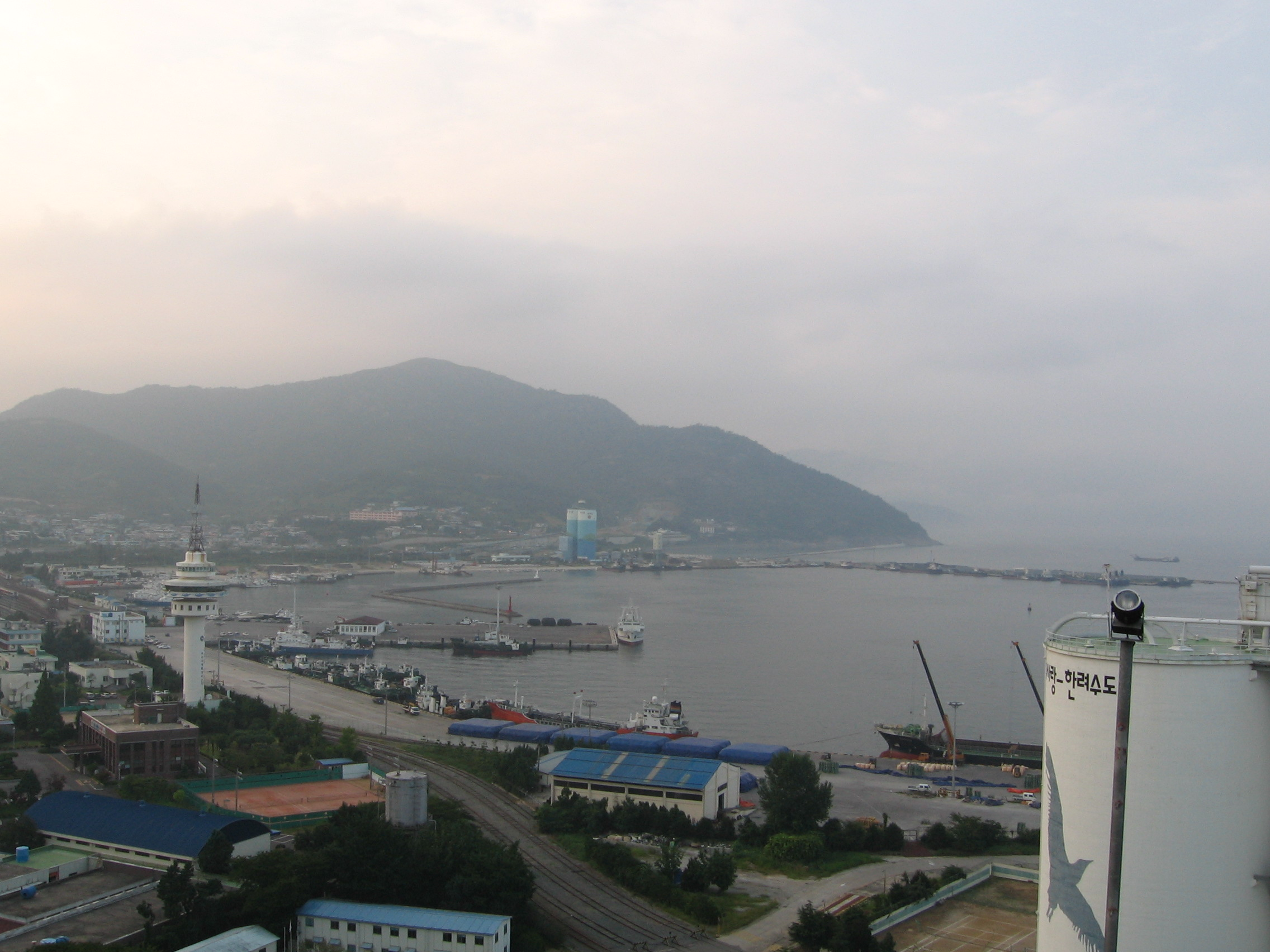
Yosu (now Yeosu) in 2005

=== North-South relations ===
Then-president of South Korea Kim Dae-jung advocated a more conciliatory approach to North Korea to foster cooperation and peace between the two countries, known as the Sunshine Policy. However, the Sunshine Policy was strained throughout 1998 as North Korea continued to conduct seaborne infiltrations and provocations against South Korea. In June, a North Korean Yugo-class submarine became entangled in a fishnet off of the South Korean coast near Sokcho, and in November a semi-submersible was again discovered in waters near the city of Ganghwa.

=== SP-10H semi-submersible ===
An improved version of the SP-10 semi-submersible, the SP-10H, was put into service by the Korean People’s Navy in 1995. It had a length of 12.8 meters, a width of 2.96 meters, and a maximum speed of 38 knots (70 km/h). The vessel that was salvaged in the Yosu incident was reportedly equipped with GPS and its surface was coated with a special radar absorbent paint. The vessel could accommodate a crew of six or seven.

== Incident ==
=== Sighting ===
On 17 December 1998, at 23:15, soldiers at a coastal surveillance post reported sighting a low-profile vessel maneuvering 2 km from the coast. Fifteen minutes later, two Republic of Korea Navy patrol boats were dispatched to search the area, but did not discover the vessel.

=== Engagement ===
At approximately 01:40 the following day, a semi-submersible was detected heading towards international waters and two patrol boats gave chase. The semi-submersible was confirmed at 04:38 by the ROKS Gwangmyeong, and at 04:45 it was detected by airborne surveillance. At approximately 05:35, the vessel reduced its speed 100 km south of Geoje Island. South Korean vessels that were in pursuit reportedly fired warning shots, and the semi-submersible fired upon them in response. At approximately 05:48 the ROKS Namwon fired on the semi-submersible with its guns, sinking it. One hour later, the body of a North Korean sailor was recovered with a live hand grenade.

=== Recovery ===
On 20 January 1999, the navy announced that a wrecked semi-submersible vessel was discovered 450 meters from the site of the sinking at a depth of 150 meters. On 22 January it was announced that another body was discovered in the stern of the ship with a rifle and live ammunition. The semi-submersible was recovered on 17 March 1999, by the ROKS Cheonghaejin and another two casualties were discovered inside.

== Aftermath ==
The navy attempted to recover the bodies of the dead North Koreans and pieces of the infiltration craft. The body of one North Korean frogman was found. From the size and type of the vessel it was assumed that the entire crew consisted of four sailors and that all had died. Searches were also conducted on nearby land to make sure that infiltrators had not landed on the coastline. When questioned, the North Korean government denied sending the vessel or knowing anything about its origins. This incident helped fuel increasing tensions between the two governments and an even larger naval skirmish was fought the next year.

The North Korean regime's Korean Central News Agency issued a statement on 19 December 1998:

The South Korean puppets said that they located a "submarine" in the sea off Ryosu, South Jolla Province, at 11:15 p.m. on December 17 and had a battle in which the "submarine" was sunken and they brought a dead body clad in diving-suit to the land. They also said that they issued an order called "Jindogae nN.1" throughout the coastal areas of South Korea and have been put on the red alert. This time, too, the puppets described the "incident" as the "intrusion by the north," shifting the blame on to the north. This frantic anti-communist campaign is a continuation of the anti-communist, anti-north campaign such as the fiction of the "intrusion of the north's vessel" near the coast of the Kanghwa island on the West Sea of Korea and the description of a flock of birds as "something mysterious" in the sea off the Kanghwa island. The incidents have nothing to do with the north. Now the South Korean are trying hard to find a pretext for unleashing a war against the north in line with the U.S. imperialists' moves for war against the DPRK. It goes without saying that the "north's submarine infiltration incident" is a farce cooked up for that purpose. We can no longer remain a passive onlooker to the South Korean continuous anti-communist campaign and slander against the north. The campaign can convince no one. We will take resolute measures so that the provokers may drink a bitter cup. We seriously warn the South Korean not to act rashly.

== See also ==
- 1996 Gangneung submarine infiltration incident
- 1998 Sokcho submarine incident
