= 1996 Gangneung submarine infiltration incident =

Naval incident between North Korea and South Korea

Coordinates: 37.718680°N 129.004508°E

Infiltration of Gangneung
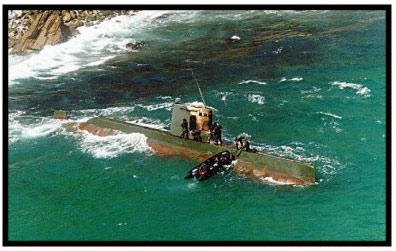
- The Sang-O-class submarine stranded on the South Korean coast
Date	17 September 1996 – 5 November 1996
Location	Gangneung, Gangwon Province, South Korea
Result	South Korean victory

Belligerents
South Korea	North Korea

Strength
43,000 personnel	1 Sang-O-class submarine 26 personnel

Casualties and losses
13 killed: 8 killed in action; 4 in accidents; 1 off-duty soldier murdered; 27 wounded	24 killed: 11 executed by own men; 13 killed in action; 1 captured (Lee Kwang-soo); 1 missing 1 submarine captured
- 3 South Korean civilians killed

The 1996 Gangneung submarine infiltration incident began on 18 September 1996 near the South Korean city of Gangneung when North Koreans abandoned their grounded submarine and hid within the city, resulting in a 49-day manhunt for the belligerents.

The incident was one of the more serious instances of North Korean espionage involving the Reconnaissance Bureau (reconnaissance team and 22nd Squadron of the Maritime Department of the Reconnaissance Bureau). The raid was launched by North Korean armed spies to assassinate the President of South Korea, Kim Young-sam, during his visit to Chunchon, on 5 October 1996.

Months after the start of the incident North Korea issued a rare apology for the events and ensuing loss of life.

== Landing ==
On 15 September 1996, a North Korean Sang-O-class submarine landed a three-person special operations reconnaissance team on the east coast of South Korea near Jeongdongjin, 20 kilometres (12 miles) south-east of Gangneung, Kangwon Province. Their mission was to spy on the naval installations in the area and then return. However, the larger mission was the assassination of South Korean President Kim Young-sam. The "reconnaissance team" alongside the submarine was to help drop off the "assassination" team, survey government facilities, and return. The "assassination team" was to assassinate president Kim Young-sam at Chunchon, a nearby city. President Kim was planning to visit Chuncheon to open a national sports event to be held on 7 October.

The submarine made a failed attempt to collect the team on the 16th and returned the following day. On the 17th it ran aground in the attempt, and all efforts to free her were unsuccessful.

The crew then decided to destroy the sensitive equipment in the submarine by starting a fire inside. They then split up in several groups unnoticed until one group was spotted at around 1:00 a.m. by a taxi driver. Suspicious of their clothing and behavior, the taxi driver alerted the authorities, who quickly mobilized.

== Manhunt ==
The 49-day manhunt, from September 18 to November 5. It resulted in the confirmed deaths of 24 North Korean infiltrators. One infiltrator, Lee Kwang-soo, was captured. Another infiltrator is thought to have escaped across the DMZ.

Three civilians and 13 South Korean soldiers (eight KIA and four in accidents) died; 27 soldiers were wounded. In a separate encounter, the commandos strangled a South Korean army private who had set out to collect firewood. The private was believed to have deserted until one of the North Koreans was found wearing his uniform.

Of the 25 North Korean infiltrators, one was captured, 11 were killed by the other members for failure in responsibility of running aground of the submarine, and 13 were killed in firefights with the South Korean army. The bodies of the 11 dead commandos were all found on top of a nearby mountain, ten of them lying together in a row wearing white t-shirts and tennis shoes, while the eleventh body was found a short distance away. All of them had been shot in the head at short range. According to the captured member, the crew had been ordered to "commit suicide to avoid capture" after the grounding of their submarine.

The infiltrators possessed among their arsenal M16A1 rifles (with accompanying 5.56mm NATO ammunition) and imitation South Korean-style military uniforms. Nestlé Crunch chocolate bars were also recovered. Some of the dead spies' corpses were displayed to the media; some were wearing South Korean-style military uniforms as disguises.

Though the last infiltrator has never been found, officials announced the end of the manhunt on November 5, believing the commando to have either escaped across the border or died.

=== Timeline of belligerent casualties ===
- 18 September, 16:40 – 1 captured by local policemen
- 18 September, 17:00 – 11 bodies of executed submarine crew members were found
- 19 September, 10:00 – 3 killed by South Korean army commandos
- 19 September, 14:00 – 3 killed by South Korean army special forces
- 19 September, 16:00 – 1 killed by the South Korean army
- 21 September, 20:00 – 1 killed by the South Korean army
- 22 September, 06:00 – 1 killed by the South Korean army
- 28 September, 06:30 – 1 killed by the South Korean army
- 30 September, 16:00 – 1 killed by South Korean special forces
- 5 November, 10:00 – 2 killed by South Korean special forces

== Evidence of activity inside South Korea ==
Amidst the manhunt, at least two of the North Korean infiltrators spent a night playing video games at a nearby ski resort according to their diaries and rolls of film left behind. The resort is located about 18 miles away from where their submarine ran aground. Film rolls showed pictures taken of a variety of South Korean military installations around. The diary further tells of how the pair lived for two weeks in a shelter they dug in the side of a mountain before making the push north to the border. In all they claim to have travelled some 80 total miles during the manhunt. On their way north they stabbed to death three civilian hikers who were out picking mushrooms when they stumbled upon the North Korean camp. The bodies of the hikers were discovered soon after.

== Responses ==
South Korean officials from both the governing party and opposition party, as well as major newspapers criticized the military for failing to detect the submarine.

- South Korea: President Kim Young-sam considered the incident to be a significant provocation and announced that any further actions could lead to war.
  - South Korea: Kwon Young-hae, director of the National Intelligence Service, called it an "armed provocation perpetrated to carry out guerrilla warfare."
- North Korea: On December 29 an apology was issued by North Korea for the incident and the loss of life.
- United Nations: On October 15 the UN Security Council officially rebuked North Korea for its actions. China joined in after careful scrutiny of the wording. The statement was the first time the UNSC addressed the Korean Peninsula since the end of the Korean war in 1953.

== Aftermath ==
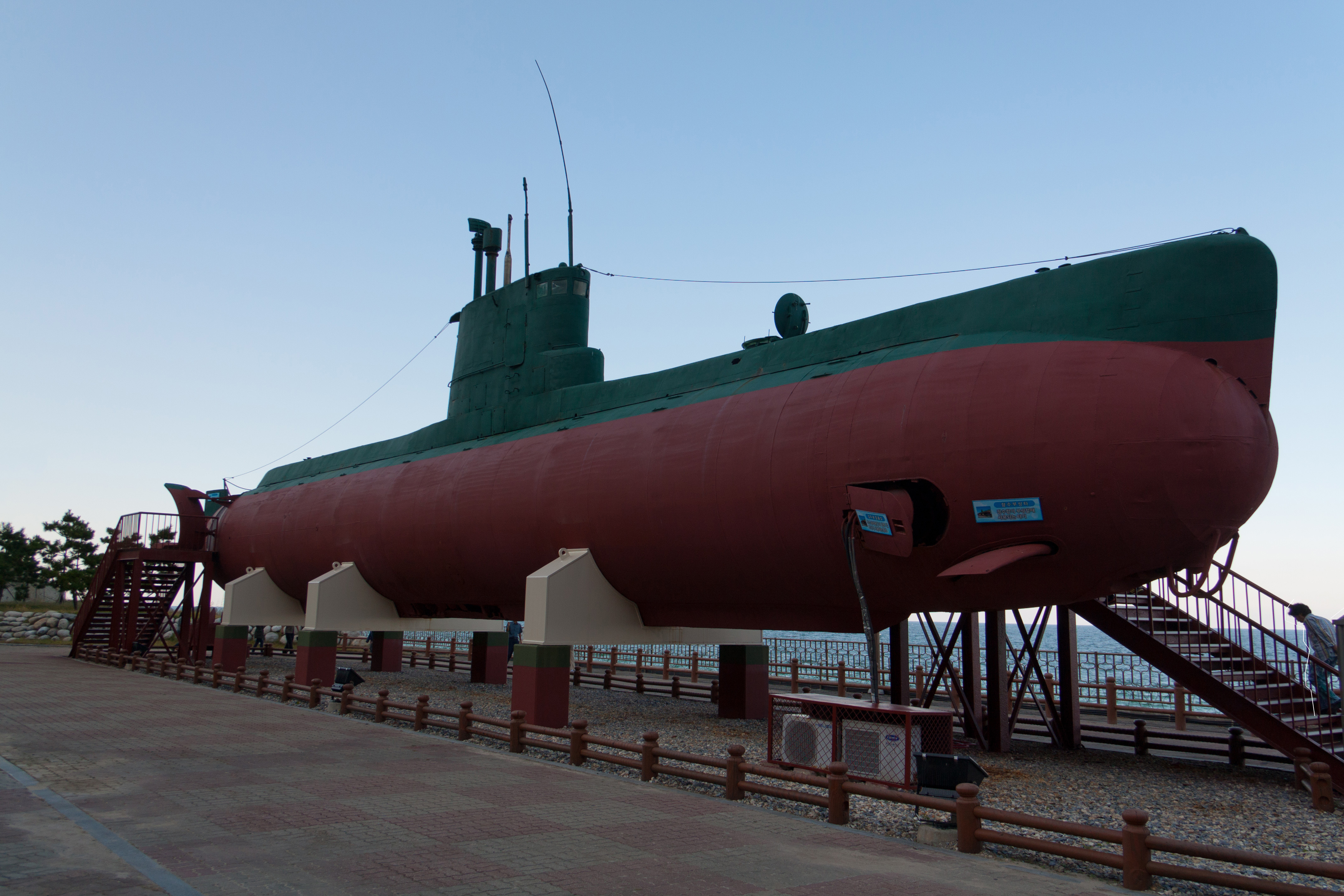
The Sang-O class submarine on display (2012)

The Sang-O class submarine was salvaged and remains on display at Tongil (Unification) Park near Gangneung.

North Korea was at first reluctant to take responsibility, claiming that the submarine had suffered an engine failure and had drifted aground. By 29 December, however, the North issued an official statement expressing "deep regret" over the submarine incident. In reciprocity, the South Korean government returned the cremated remains of the soldiers to the North via Panmunjom the very next day, the first event of its kind between the neighboring countries.

Some analysts suspected that the motivation behind the assassination of Choe Deok-geun, South Korean consul for the Russian Far East, was North Korean retaliation for the loss of their men.

Lee Kwang-soo, the only captured North Korean, remained in South Korea and in 2007 it was reported that he had become an instructor for the South Korean navy. In 2010 Lee Kwang-soo was interviewed once more for his perspective on that year's sinking of ROKS Cheonan.

== See also ==
- 1998 Sokcho submarine incident
- 1998 Yosu submersible incident
- Fushin-sen
