= 1998 Sokcho submarine incident =

Combat incident between North Korea and South Korea

Coordinates: 38.228°N 128.728°E

- Part of the Korean conflict
Date	22 June 1998
Location	Offshore of Sokcho, Kangwon Province, South Korea
Result	Loss of North Korean submarine and personnel

Belligerents
South Korea	North Korea

Strength
1 Pohang-class corvette	1 Yugo-class submarine

Casualties and losses
None	1 submarine captured 9 dead (5 executed, 4 by suicide)

The 1998 Sokcho submarine incident occurred on 22 June 1998, offshore of the South Korean city of Sokcho.

== Capture ==
On 22 June, a North Korean Yugo-class submarine became entangled in a fishing driftnet in South Korean waters approximately 18 kilometres (11 mi) east of the port of Sokcho and 33 kilometres (21 mi) south of the inter-Korean border. A South Korean fishing boat observed several submarine crewmen trying to untangle the submarine from the fishing net. The South Korean navy sent a Pohang-class corvette which towed the submarine (with the crew still inside) to a navy base at the port of Donghae. The submarine sank as it was being towed into port. It was unclear if this was as a result of damage or a deliberate scuttling by the crew.

On 23 June, the Korean Central News Agency admitted that a submarine had been lost in a training accident.

On 25 June, the submarine was salvaged from a depth of approximately 30 metres (100 ft) and the bodies of nine crewmen were recovered. Four crewmen had committed suicide by shooting themselves, after first shooting and killing five others in what South Korean officials called an apparent murder-suicide, noting that there were signs of a struggle. The presence of South Korean drinks suggested that the crew had completed an espionage mission. Log books found in the submarine showed that it had infiltrated South Korean waters on a number of previous occasions.

The bodies of the members of submarine crew were subsequently returned to North Korea in a ceremony that took place in Panmunjom on 3 July 1998.

== See also ==
- 1996 Gangneung submarine infiltration incident
- 1998 Yosu submersible incident
