= History of the Korean People's Navy =

The history of the Korean People's Army Naval Force is short compared to most modern navies. It began with the creation of a "Maritime Security Force" on June 5, 1946. The headquarters for the force was based in the North Korean city of Wonsan, and was operational by July 1946. The headquarters were then expanded and moved to the capital, Pyongyang, for more effective management of seabound traffic, and the forces were renamed Marine Patrols in December of the same year. The Marine Patrol Academy was established in Wonsan in June 1947 in order to train and commission a professional corps of naval officers.

Initially operating under the North Korean Ministry of Interior (내무성), commanding authority was transferred to the National Security Department (민족보위성, precursor to Ministry of defence) on August 20, 1949. The introduction of a torpedo fleet into the unit on August 29, made it formally recognized as a naval force, and the date was commemorated as Navy Day until it was changed to honour the June 5th date in 1993.

== Korean People's Army Naval Force organization in 1950 ==
1st Patrol boats Squadron	2nd PT boats Squadron	3rd Minesweepers Squadron	Other Ships	Ref
3 (Soviet Union) OD-200 type submarine chasers	5 (Soviet Union) G-5 type PT boats	2 (United States) YMS-type minesweepers 1 ex- (Empire of Japan) minesweeper	1 floating base, 1 military transport and 6 motorboats of different displacement and type	

== Operations and engagements ==
- Landing operation near Kangnung and Samcheok (June 25–26, 1950)
- Battle of Chumonchin Chan (July 2, 1950)
- Battle of Haeju (September 10, 1950)
- Pueblo incident (January 23, 1968)
- Gangneung Infiltration (September 17, 1996 - November 5, 1996)
- Battle of Yosu (December 17–18, 1998)
- First Battle of Yeonpyeong (June 9–15, 1999)
- Battle of Amami-Ōshima (December 22, 2001)
- Second Battle of Yeonpyeong (June 29, 2002)
- Battle of Daecheong (November 10, 2009)
- ROKS Cheonan sinking (March 26, 2010)

=== Landing operation near Kangnung and Samcheok ===
June 25, 1950, North Korean troops invade South Korea. On the morning of 25 June an armed North Korean steamer (ex US transport of 1000t, taken by South Korean communists to the North in October 1949) tried to disembark about 600 troops 18 miles off Pusan, but it was sighted and sunk by Republic of Korea Navy (ROKN) patrol craft Bak Du San ("PC 701"). This was the first naval surface action of the war. At the same time North Korean convoy (2 submarine chasers, 1 minesweeper and 20 schooners) started disembarkation of 4 battalions in Kangnung area; another convoy (2 minesweepers, 1 patrol ship, 1 submarine chaser) - disembarkation of communist guerrillas near Samcheok. ROKN minesweeper YMS-509, patrolling the area near Okgye, tried to prevent disembarkation, but after a short battle, North Korean minesweeper No 31 was forced to withdraw to the south. Totally, in these landing operations the North Korean Navy lost 1 transport and 2 schooners (last two was sunk by ROKN YMS-509).

=== Chumunjin battle ===
July 2, 1950, at 06:15 of the morning South Korean Support Group (cruisers USS Juneau & HMS Jamaica, frigate HMS Black Swan) sighted a North Korean Navy convoy (four torpedo boats, two motor gunboats and ten motor trawlers loaded with ammunition) heading north from Chumunjin. As the cruisers put on speed to intercept the enemy, the torpedo boats, with more bravery than discretion, turned to attack. Fire was opened at 11,000 yards, and by the time the range had closed to 4,000 one PT had been sunk ("No 24") and one stopped ("No 22"), a third was heading for the beach ("No 23"), and the fourth ("No 21") was escaping seaward. The final score of the engagement was three torpedo boats and both gunboats destroyed, and two prisoners taken by HMS Jamaica. Following this first engagement with the North Korean Navy, also in effect the last, the cruisers bombarded shore batteries at Kangnung.

== After the Korean War ==
The first bigger warships acquired in December 1953 by the Korean People's Navy were two Soviet minesweepers of Project 53 (NATO reporting name: Tral), former T-2 Tros and T-8 Cheka). New Russian sources do not confirm transferring of eight minesweepers, as indicated by Western literature.

== Reported 2016 submarine sinking ==
On March 11, 2016 CNN and the U.S. Naval Institute News reported that unnamed US officials believed a North Korean submarine had been lost at sea in the Sea of Japan. According to reports, the U.S. military had been observing the submarine when it "stopped" before the North Korean navy was observed searching the area by American satellites, aircraft and ships.

== See also ==
- Korean People's Navy
