= ROKS Tongyeong =

Tongyeong-class salvage and rescue ship

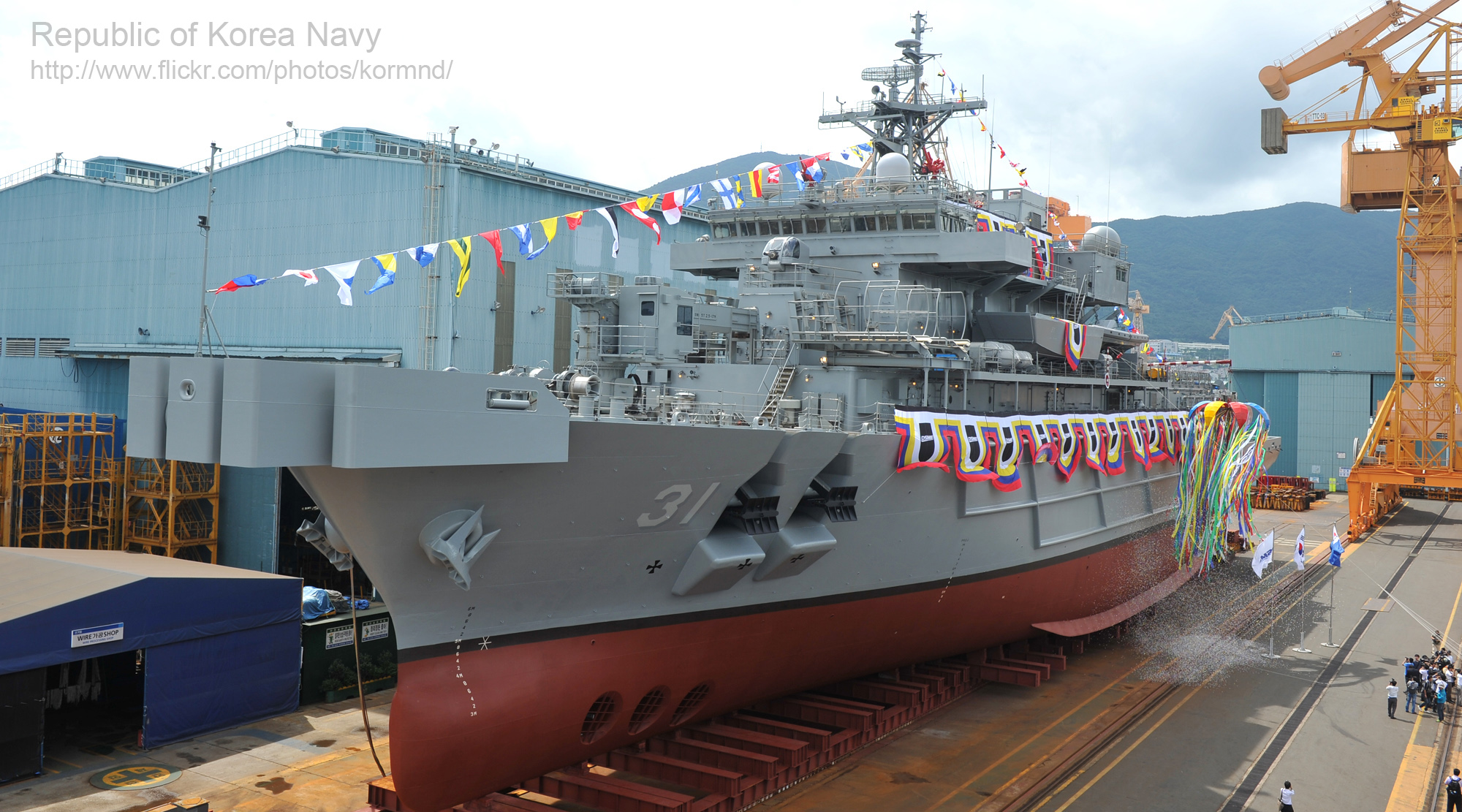
- ROKS Tongyeong on 4 September 2012

History

South Korea
- Name: Tongyeong; (통영)
- Namesake: Tongyeong
- Ordered: October 2010
- Builder: DSME
- Launched: 4 September 2012
- Commissioned: 30 December 2014
- Identification: Pennant number: ATS-31
- Status: Active

General characteristics
- Class & type: Tongyeong-class salvage and rescue ship
- Displacement: 3,500 tonnes (3,445 long tons)
- Length: 107.54 m (352 ft 10 in)
- Beam: 16.8 m (55 ft 1 in)
- Speed: 21 knots (39 km/h; 24 mph)
- Sensors & processing systems: Sonar
- Armament: 1 × M61 Vulcan
- Aviation facilities: Helipad

ROKS Tongyeong (ATS-31) is the lead ship of the Tongyeong-class salvage and rescue ship in the Republic of Korea Navy. She is named after the city, Tongyeong.

== Design ==
The Tongyeong-class has a total tonnage of 3500 tons and a length of 107.5m with a width of 16.8m. Their maximum speed is up to 21 knots (about 39 km/h).

- Decompression chamber: 2 decompression chambers capable of accommodating up to 8 people (including surgeons) so that divers (SSUs) can perform rescue missions at a depth of 90m.
- Flight deck for take-off and landing of medium-sized helicopters.
- Equipped with automatic ship retaining device (thrust, propeller) on the bow and stern, it can rotate 360 degrees in place.
- ROV mounted - ROV, which was not present in the old Pyeongtaek-class salvage and rescue ships, was installed. It was decided to mount the same model, the Celling Robotics HD ROV, on the Gwangyang. The ROV of the Tongyeong is capable of operating up to 3 km below the sea floor, which is too deep for humans to bear, and is equipped with two robot arms, nine cameras, and a cutter. It weighs 3.5 tons, has a maximum speed of 3 knots, and has a lifting capacity of about 250 kg.
- 90 m divers support equipment - The air hose allows divers to perform long-term rescue operations at 90 m underwater.
- Crane - The 570-ton Yoon Youngha-class patrol vessels can be lifted with a crane.
- Towing - Ability to tow a Dokdo-class amphibious assault ship.
- Sonar: A fish finder was installed due to corruption in the defense industry.

== Construction and career ==
ROKS Tongyeong was launched on 4 September 2012 by Daewoo Shipbuilding and commissioned on 30 December 2014.

During the sinking of MV Sewol on April 16, 2014, the deployment of the Tongyeong was discussed. Daewoo Shipbuilding & Marine Engineering had not yet delivered to the Navy as it was undergoing a performance test, it had not yet been commissioned, was not yet equipped with the Navy's equipment, and thus the Navy rejected the deployment.

Tongyeong was found that the fixed hull sonar (sonar) and the ultrasonic camera of the underwater unmanned probe were inferior in performance. The Joint Defense Industry Corruption Investigation Team was arrested after it was discovered that the company in charge of the project had falsified documents and submitted them to active-duty officers belonging to the Defense Acquisition Program Administration. However, the Navy decided to deploy the Tongyeong in April 2015 without the relevant equipment and was delivered to the Navy on December 30, 2014. However, the final judgment of the Supreme Court later acquitted all of the major naval personnel involved in the corruption of the Tongyeong, and there is a public opinion that it may be the result of the prosecution's unreasonable investigation into the defense corruption.

== Gallery ==
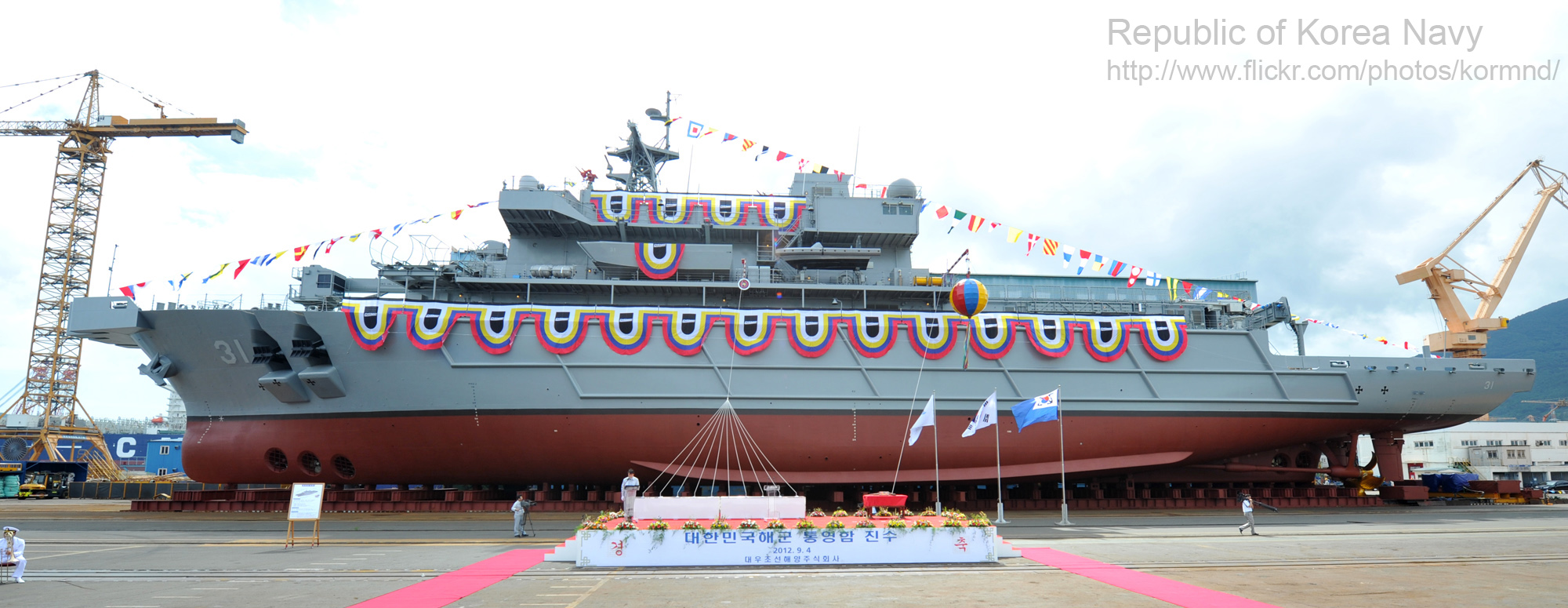

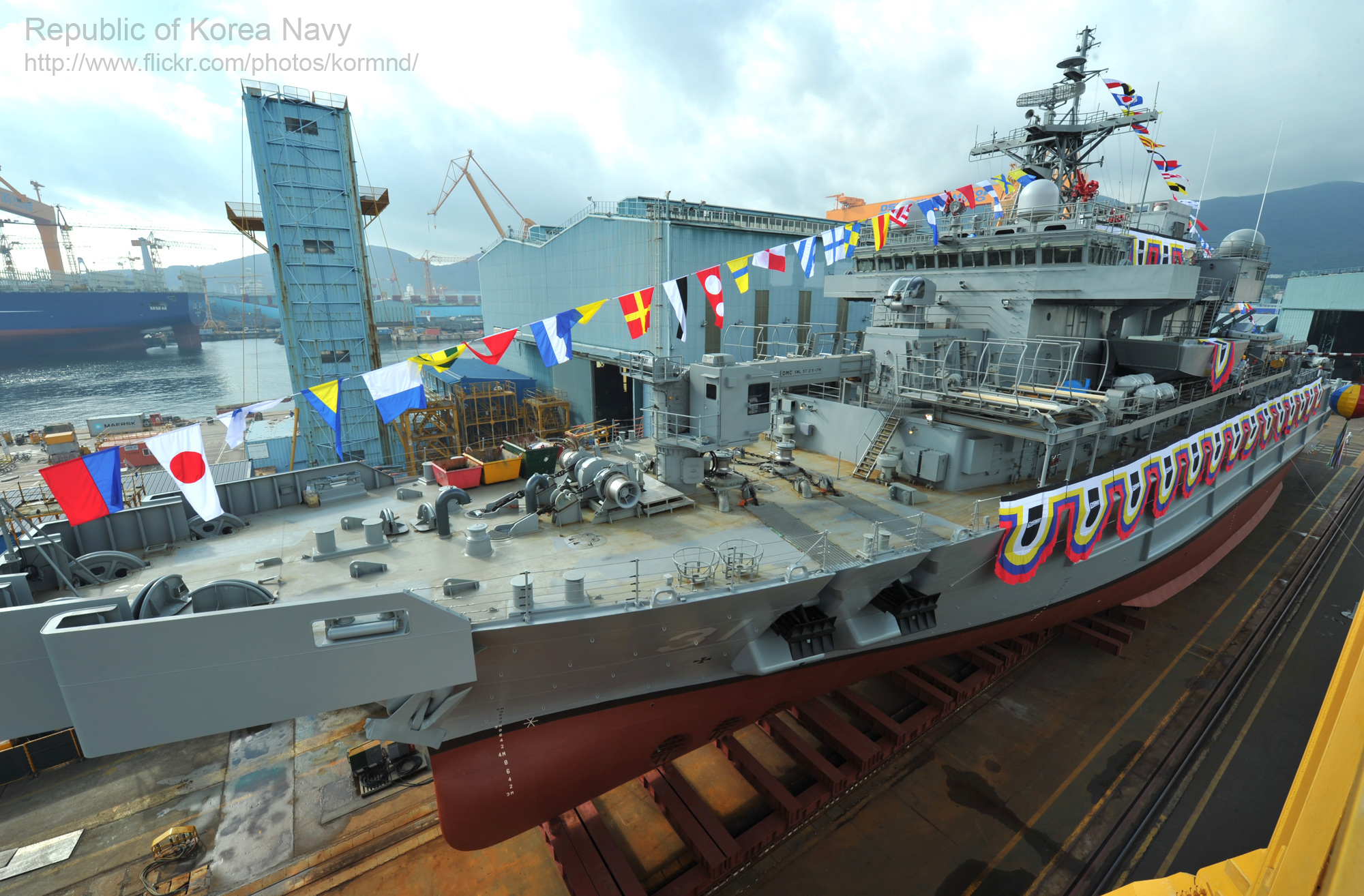

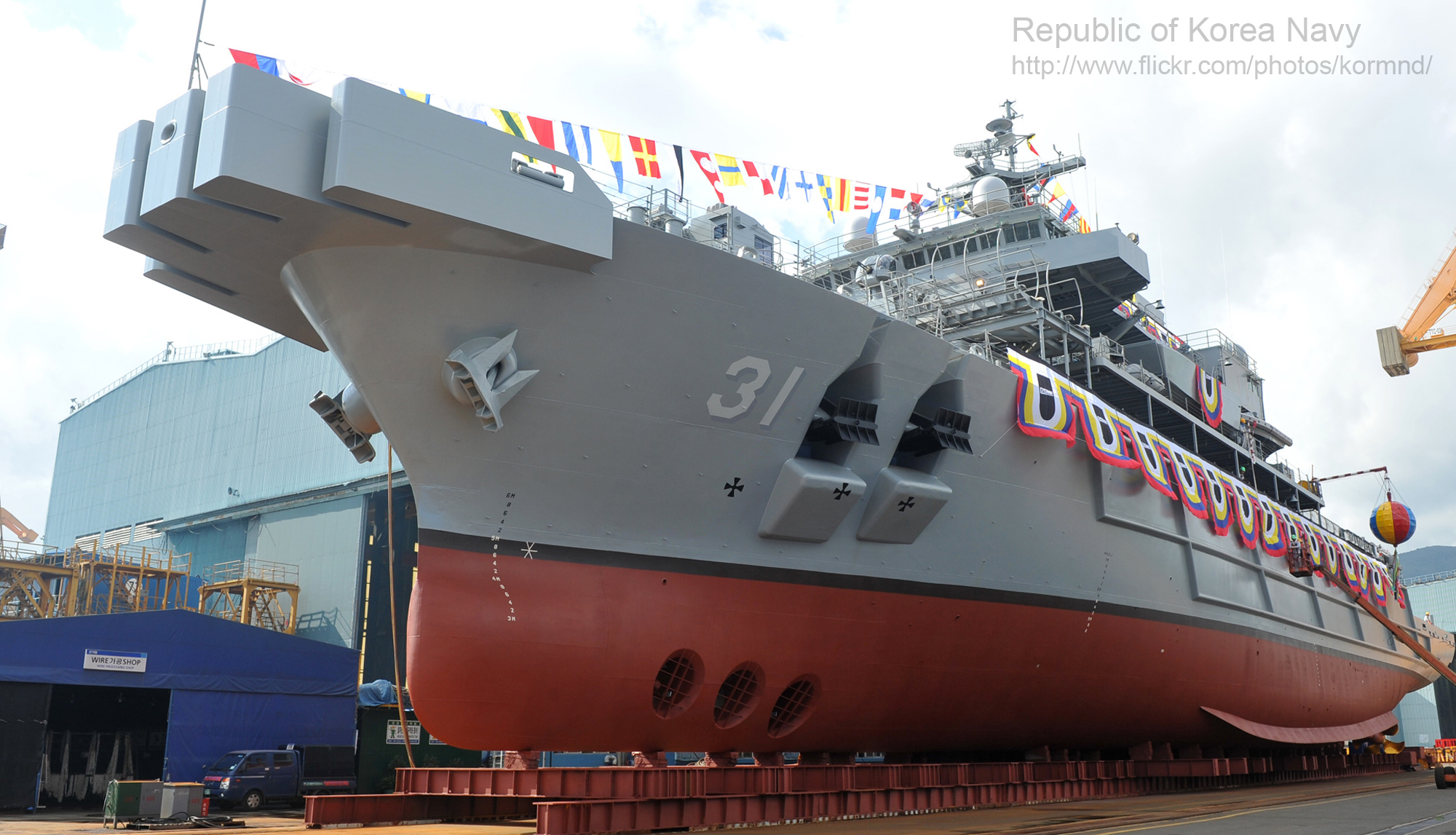

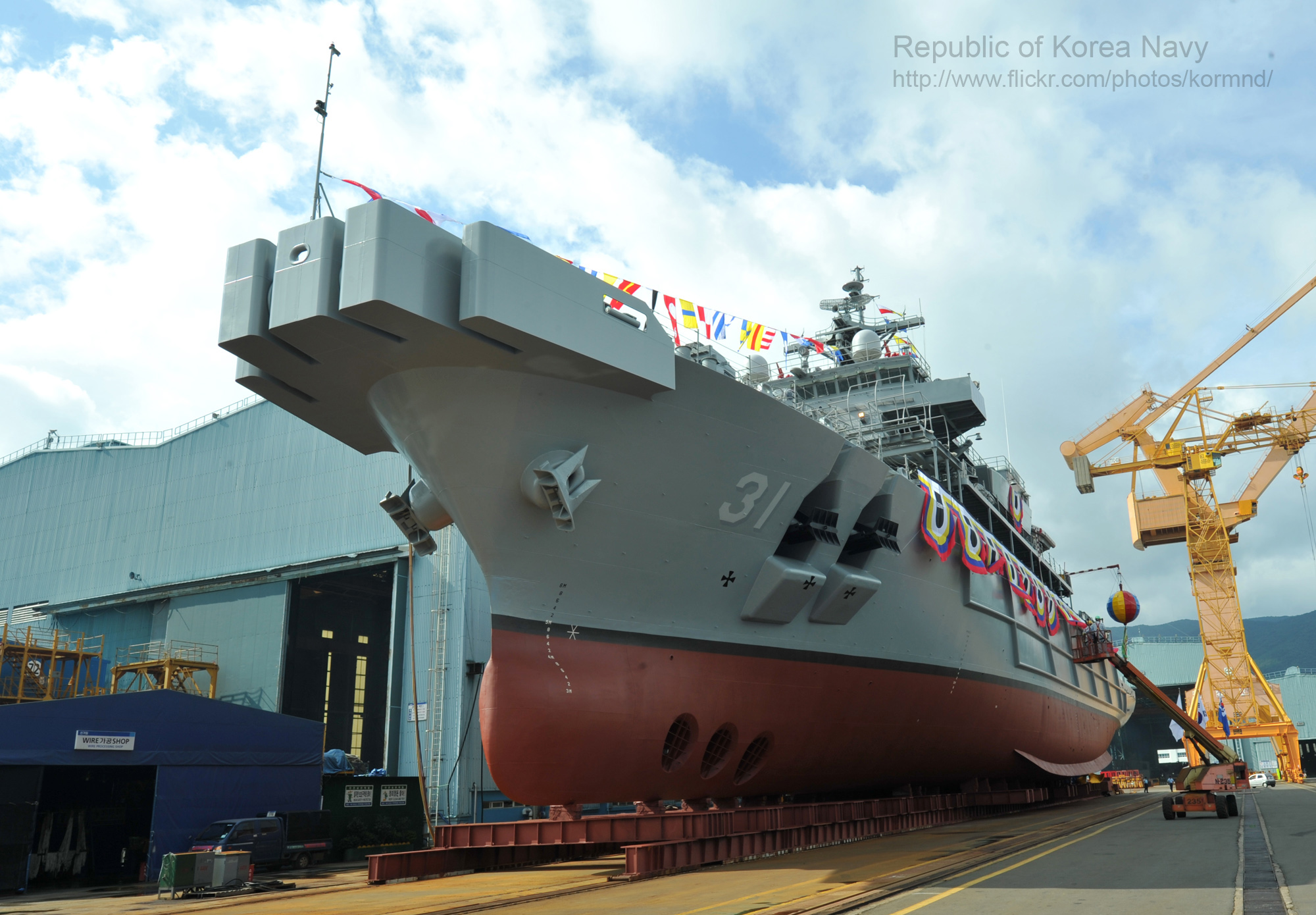

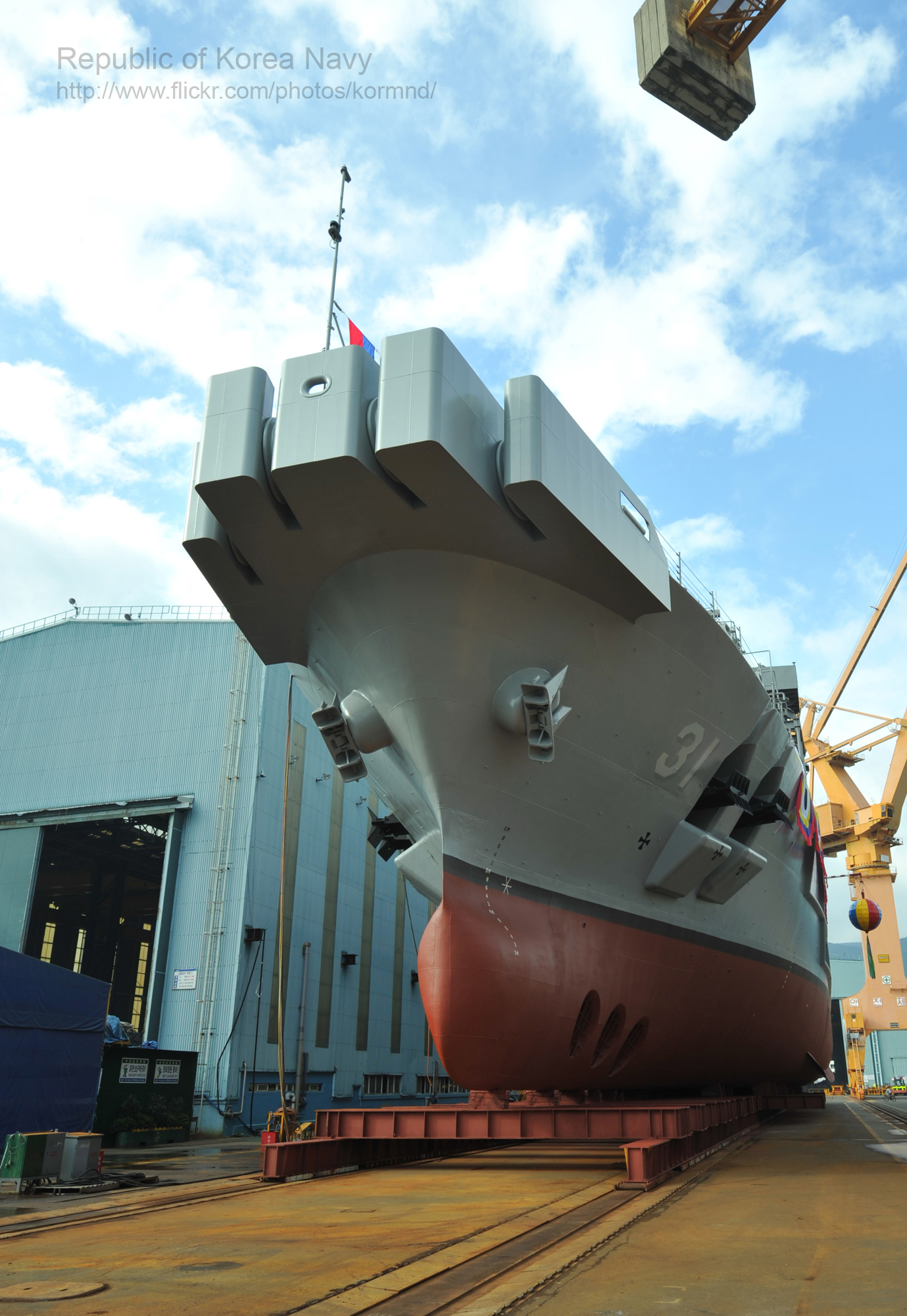
