= P33 =

P33, P-33 or P.33 may refer to:

== Vessels ==
- ARA Granville (P-33), a corvette of the Argentine Navy
- GNS Stephen Otu (P33), a patrol boat of the Ghana Navy
- HMS P33 (1916), a P-class sloop of the Royal Navy
- HMS P33 (1941), a submarine of the Royal Navy
- INS Abhay (P33), ships of the Indian Navy

== Other uses ==
- Boulton & Paul P.33 Partridge, a British prototype fighter aircraft
- Cochise County Airport, in Cochise County, Arizona, United States
- Consolidated XP-33, an American prototype fighter aircraft
- Papyrus 33, a biblical manuscript
- Phosphorus-33, a radioactive isotope of phosphorus
- P33, a state regional road in Latvia
