= NRTL Kamenassa =

Timor-Leste patrol boat

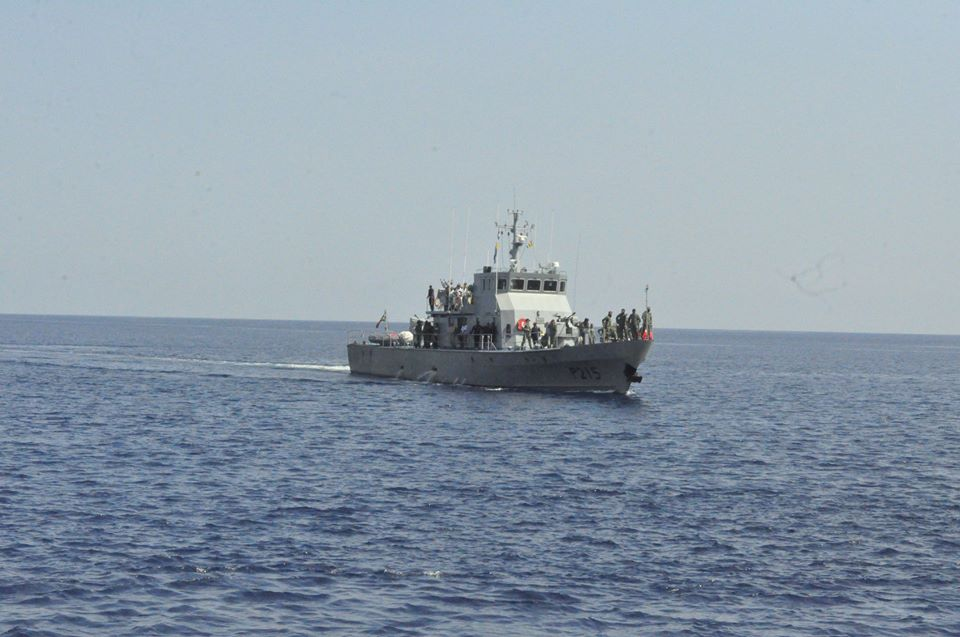
- Kamenassa in 2015

History

South Korea
- Name: P217
- Commissioned: 11 December 1978
- Fate: Transferred to Timor-Leste

Timor-Leste
- Name: Kamenassa
- Acquired: August 2011
- Commissioned: 26 September 2011
- Fate: Sunk as a dive wreck 15 July 2023

General characteristics
- Class & type: Chamsuri-class patrol boat
- Displacement: 112 t (110 long tons) light; 147 t (145 long tons) full load
- Length: 33.10 m (108 ft 7 in)
- Beam: 6.92 m (22 ft 8 in)
- Draft: 1.75 m (5 ft 9 in)
- Propulsion: 2 × MTU MD538 TU90 diesel engines; 2 propellers
- Speed: 38 knots (70 km/h; 44 mph)
- Range: 1,000 nmi (1,900 km; 1,200 mi) at 20 knots (37 km/h; 23 mph)
- Complement: 31
- Sensors & processing systems: 1 × STX RadarSys SPS-100k surface search radar; 1 × Saab CEROS fire radar and optronic sight
- Electronic warfare & decoys: 2 × KDAGAIE Mk2 decoys
- Armament: 1 × Bofors 40 mm gun; 2 × Sea Vulcan (late model)

NRTL Kamenassa was a Chamsuri-class patrol boat of the Timor-Leste Defence Force. Built for the Republic of Korea Navy as P217 in 1978, it was transferred to Timor-Leste with two other boats in 2011. The ship was intentionally sunk as a dive wreck in 2023.

== History ==
The boat was built by Korea Shipbuilding Corporation and was commissioned into the ROKN as P217 on 11 December 1978. It was decommissioned in 2011 and handed over to the maritime component of the Timor-Leste Defence Force, with two other patrol boats named NRTL Dili and NRTL Hera. The new boats had the primary purpose of countering illegal fishing activities and protecting the territorial waters of Timor-Leste.

By 2023, the boat had fallen into disrepair, and SCUBA divers of the Timorese maritime component began searching for an appropriate site to scuttle the ship for use as a dive site. On 15 July 2023, the boat's mast was removed, it was tugged into the dive location 40 kilometers from Dili at K41 East. The ship was sunk by cutting holes in the bow and stern, and rests 18 meters from the water's surface.
