= Daecheong incident =

2009 South and North Korean naval skirmish

- Part of the Korean Conflict
- Daecheong Island (numbered 2)
Date	November 10, 2009
Location	Off the coast of Daecheong Island, Yellow Sea 37°49′30″N 124°42′00″E
Result	Inconclusive

Belligerents
North Korea: Korean People's Navy	South Korea: Republic of Korea Navy

Strength
1 gunboat	1 frigate 4 patrol boats

Casualties and losses
1 gunboat moderately damaged 8 wounded	1 patrol boat slightly damaged (with 15 bullet marks)

The Daecheong incident, also known as the Battle of Daecheong, was a skirmish between the South Korean and North Korean navies near the Northern Limit Line (NLL) on 10 November 2009 off Daecheong Island.

== Engagement ==
The incident began at 11:27 am when a North Korean navy patrol boat crossed the NLL, which is not recognised by the DPRK, followed by two verbal warnings from South Korean naval units. After one more warning announcement, one of the South Korean patrol boats fired a warning shot. In response, the North Korean boat began firing at the South Korean ship. This resulted in a short exchange of fire between the sides. The North Korean vessel expended approximately 50 rounds, and the South Korean craft returned fire with 200 rounds.

The Korean Central News Agency (KCNA), the official news agency of North Korea, accused the South Korean Navy of provoking the confrontation at the maritime boundary between the two Koreas. The DPRK news agency reported that:

... the North side let a patrol boat of the Navy of the KPA on routine guard duty promptly go into action to confirm an unidentified object that intruded into the waters of its side.

When the patrol boat was sailing back after confirming the object at about 11:20 a group of warships of the South Korean forces chased it and perpetrated such a grave provocation as firing at it.

The patrol boat of the North side, which has been always combat-ready, lost no time to deal a prompt retaliatory blow at the provokers. Much flurried by this, the group of warships of the South Korean forces hastily took to flight to the waters of their side.

== Aftermath ==
After the battle, South Korea claimed their patrol boat suffered only superficial damage (15 bullet marks on the ship's side) with no casualties, while the fire-gutted North Korean patrol boat was moderately damaged. A news agency in South Korea reported a rumor that North Korea suffered four casualties (one killed and three wounded). On the other hand, a defector said about 10 North Korean sailors were killed in action. The KCNA pressed South Korea to apologize.

== See also ==
- First Battle of Yeonpyeong
- Second Battle of Yeonpyeong
- ROKS Cheonan sinking
