= Battle of Yeonpyeong (1999) =

1999 naval incident between North Korea and South Korea

First battle of Yeonpyeong
- Part of the Korean Conflict
- Yeonpyeong Island (numbered 3)
Date	9–15 June 1999 (6 days)
Location	Northern Limit Line, Yellow Sea
Result	South Korean victory

Belligerents
North Korea: Korean People's Navy	South Korea: Republic of Korea Navy

Casualties and losses
South Korean claim 1 torpedo boat sunk 3 patrol boats severely damaged 2 patrol boats slightly damaged 17–30 killed ~70 wounded	1 corvette slightly damaged 1 patrol boat slightly damaged 9 wounded

The Battle of Yeonpyeong (or First Battle of Yeonpyeong) (South Korean: 제1연평해전; RR: Je Il Yeonpyeong Haejeon) took place between the navies of the Democratic People's Republic of Korea (North Korea) and the Republic of Korea (South Korea) on 15 June 1999, off the island of Yeonpyeong.

== Prelude ==
The battle occurred after North Korea began a sustained campaign to redraw the maritime boundary line – known as the Northern Limit Line (NLL) – between the two Koreas. On 6 June 1999, North Korea's state-controlled Korean Central News Agency (KCNA) claimed that the "sea boundary line" had been violated by South Korean warships that had illegally trespassed in the North's territorial waters.

The following day, three North Korean patrol boats and thirteen fishing boats belonging to the North Korean Navy (KPN) crossed the NLL 5.6 nautical miles (10.4 km; 6.4 mi) off Yeonpyeong. The South Korean Navy (ROKN) responded by sending five fast boats and four patrol ships in a bid to prevent the North Koreans from crossing the NLL.

On 8 June, seven North Korean patrol boats and seventeen fishing vessels repeatedly crossed the NLL between 05:55 and 23:20 local time. Twelve South Korean fast boats and four patrol ships were deployed and South Korean fishing boats were ordered to leave the area. The South Korean military issued a directive ordering a "bold response" to North Korean provocations, while stressing the need to uphold the rules of engagement.

The first physical confrontation occurred on 9 June, when six North Korean patrol boats and five fishing boats crossed the NLL again. As on the previous day, the South Koreans deployed twelve patrol boats and four patrol ships. At 06:35, a North Korean patrol boat collided with a South Korean fast boat, causing minor damage.

The South Korean Ministry of National Defense issued a statement calling on the North Koreans to desist. Further clashes occurred the following day when South Korean fast boats confronted four North Korean patrol boats that were accompanying a group of twenty fishing boats. The South Korean government decided at this point to use force to oppose further crossings of the NLL.

The disputed maritime border between North and South Korea in the West Sea: A: United Nations Command-created Northern Limit Line, 1953 B: North Korea-declared "Inter-Korean MDL", 1999 The locations of specific islands are reflected in the configuration of each maritime boundary, including: 1 – Yeonpyeong Island; 2 – Baengnyeong Island; 3 – Daecheong Island; Other map features: 4 – Jung-gu (Incheon Intl. Airport); 5 – Seoul; 6 – Incheon; 7 – Haeju; 8 – Kaesong; 9 – Ganghwa County; 10 – Bukdo Myeon; 11 – Deokjeokdo; 12 – Jawol Myeon; 13 – Yeongheung Myeon

On 11 June, the South Korean Navy began forcibly responding to continued North Korean crossings of the NLL by launching a "bumping offensive", using its boats to physically push aside the North Koreans. Four North Korean boats were damaged, two seriously, while three of the South Korean boats suffered damage to their hulls. The North Koreans retaliated on 12 June by attempting their own "bumping offensive" but were outmanoeuvred by the South Koreans.

The North Korean Navy deployed three torpedo boats the next day, prompting a deployment of two Pohang-class corvettes by the South Koreans on 14 June. By this time, the North Koreans' patrol boats had crossed the NLL 52 times and their fishing boats had crossed 62 times.

== Main clash ==
The battle began on the morning of 15 June. The North Koreans had twenty fishing boats south of the NLL, which were joined at 08:45 by four patrol boats. The patrol boats began attempting to "bump" South Korean fast boats. At 09:04 they were reinforced by three North Korean torpedo boats which joined in the "bumping offensive". The South Koreans again outmanoeuvred the North Koreans and began ramming them, hitting six North Korean vessels in the stern.

The North Korean patrol boat PT-381 found itself being bumped by two South Korean fast craft simultaneously, one hitting it in the stern and the other in the side. At 09:28, the crew of PT-381 fired machine guns and 25 mm cannon at the two South Korean fast craft. The South Koreans retaliated with a 20 mm Gatling gun and 40 mm and 76 mm weapons. During the next fourteen minutes, the South Koreans fired a total of 4,584 rounds of ammunition before breaking off the engagement.

The battle resulted in the sinking of at least one forty-ton North Korean torpedo boat, severe damage to a 420-ton patrol craft, crippling of two 215-ton patrol boats and slight damage to two seventy-ton patrol boats. Official South Korean estimates put the casualties at seventeen to thirty North Korean personnel killed, though unofficial estimates suggested that the figure could have been over 100. One South Korean patrol ship and four fast craft were damaged and nine sailors were slightly injured.

== Aftermath ==
The North Koreans retreated to their side of the NLL by 11:00 and ceased crossing the line. Although military tensions on the Korean peninsula escalated for a while as a result of the battle, no further conflict resulted at that time. South Korea asserted severe losses were suffered by North Korean navy, meanwhile the North Korean government claimed victory; KCNA asserted that "more than ten enemy battleships were either burned or severely damaged and they had no alternative but to flee, taking many dead bodies and remnants with them."

Minor incidents and incursions concerning fishing in the area have since continued, including another naval skirmish in 2002 known as the "Second Battle of Yeonpyeong" and another in 2009 known as the "Battle of Daecheong". In November 2010, North Korea attacked Yeonpyeong itself.
