= Battle of Yeonpyeong (2002) =

Naval incident between North Korea and South Korea

Second Battle of Yeonpyeong
- Part of the Korean conflict
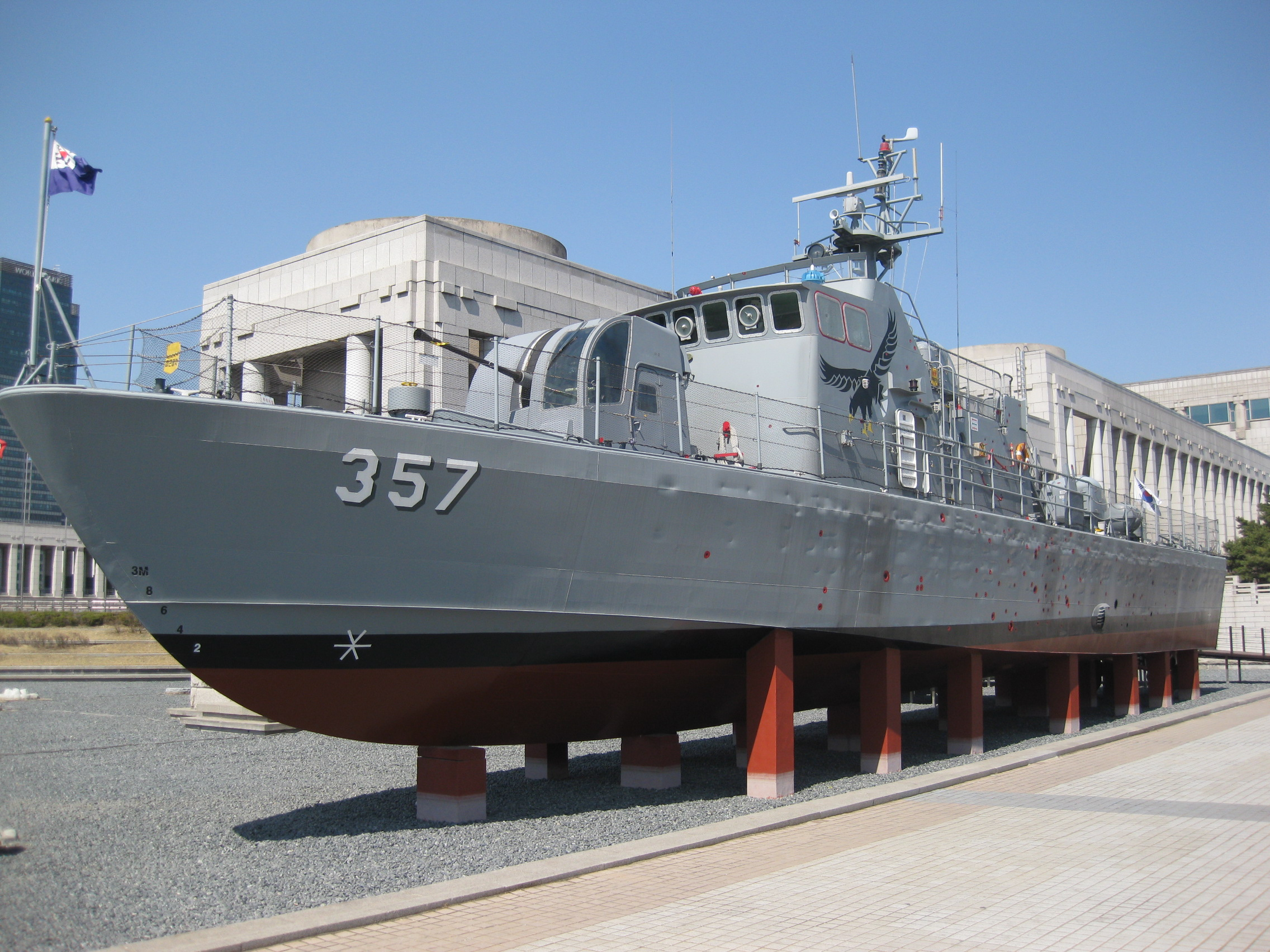
- PKM-357 replica on display at the War Memorial of Korea
Date	29 June 2002
Location	Northern Limit Line, Yellow Sea
Result	KPAN Tactical Victory

Belligerents
South Korea; Republic of Korea Navy	North Korea; Korean People's Navy

Commanders and leaders
Yoon Yeong-ha †; Lee Hui-wan (WIA); Han Sang-guk †	Kim Yeong-sik †

Strength
2 corvettes; 4 patrol boats	2 patrol boats

Casualties and losses
1 patrol boat sunk 6 men killed 18 wounded	South Korean claim: 1 patrol boat severely damaged 13 men killed 25 wounded

The Battle of Yeonpyeong, also known as the Second Battle of Yeonpyeong (South Korean: 제2연평해전; RR: Je I Yeonpyeong Haejeon), was a confrontation at sea between North Korean and South Korean patrol boats along a disputed maritime boundary near Yeonpyeong Island in the Yellow Sea in 2002. This followed a similar confrontation in 1999. Two North Korean patrol boats crossed the contested border and engaged two South Korean Chamsuri-class patrol boats. The North Koreans withdrew before South Korean reinforcements arrived.

This event sparked controversy in South Korea over the “blocking maneuver” in response to Northern Limit Line violations. Subsequently, the blocking maneuver was removed from the rules of engagement.

== Background ==
The disputed maritime demarcation line between North and South Korea in the Yellow Sea: A: United Nations-created Northern Limit Line, 1953 B: North Korea-declared "Inter-Korean MDL", 1999 The locations of specific islands are reflected in the configuration of each maritime boundary, including: 1 – Yeonpyeong Island; 2 – Baengnyeong Island; 3 – Daecheong Island; Other map features: 4 – Jung-gu (Incheon Intl. Airport); 5 – Seoul; 6 – Incheon; 7 – Haeju; 8 – Kaesong; 9 – Ganghwa County; 10 – Bukdo Myeon; 11 – Deokjeokdo; 12 – Jawol Myeon; 13 – Yeongheung Myeon

The Northern Limit Line is considered by South Korea to be the maritime boundary between itself and North Korea, while North Korea disagrees and states that the boundary is farther south. North Korean fishing vessels often wander into the area and are frequently chased away by South Korean patrol vessels. Occasionally a North Korean patrol tries to enforce its southern claim by traversing the limit line. In 2002 one such incursion turned into a naval battle along the limit line.

== Engagement ==
=== Comparison of Forces ===
The specifications of the naval vessels of North and South Korea are as follows.

South Korea

- Chamsuri High-Speed Vessel 357

Specifications: Displacement 170 tons, Length 37m, Beam 6.7m, Draft 1.7m, Crew 32 (3 officers, 29 non-commissioned officers and crew), Maximum speed 37 knots, Cruising speed 7 knots, Range 600 nautical miles Armament: 1 × 40mm gun (bow), 2 × 20mm Vulcan guns (stern), 2 × M60 machine guns

North Korea

- SO-1 class PCF(Dongsan Got Patrol Boat 684)

Specifications: Displacement 207 tons, Length 42m, Beam 6.1m, Draft 1.9m, Crew 30–40 (details unknown), Maximum speed 28 knots, Cruising speed 13 knots, Range 1,100 nautical miles Armament: 1 × 45mm SM-21-ZIF autocannon (North Korea replaced it with an 85mm ZiS-S-53 tank gun), 2 × 25mm 2M-3M twin autocannons (North Korea replaced them with 37mm M1939 (61-K) autocannons), RBU-1200 400mm torpedo launcher

=== Battle Situation ===
The timeline of events on June 29, 2002, is as follows:

- 06:30 Three squadrons of South Korean high-speed vessels (6 vessels) set sail to support fishing protection.
- 09:54 North Korean patrol boat Dongsan Got 388 (155 tons) begins crossing the NLL and heading south. South Korean Navy 253 high-speed vessel squadron conducts a response maneuver.
- 10:01 North Korean high-speed vessel Dongsan Got 684 (215 tons) additionally heads south. South Korean Navy 232 high-speed vessel squadron conducts a response maneuver.
- 10:25 North Korean Dongsan Got 684 opens fire with its 85mm naval gun at Chamsuri 357, which was conducting a blocking maneuver at a distance of 450m. South Korean 232 squadron returns fire. During this process, the bridge of Chamsuri 357 is destroyed, and Captain Yun Young-ha is killed.
- 10:26 Rear squadrons 253 and 256 high-speed vessels begin suppressive fire.
- 10:30 Squadron 256 begins its attack.
- 10:33 Squadron 253 begins its attack.
- 10:43 Jecheon (Pohang-class corvette) begins fire support.
- 10:47 Jinhae (Pohang-class corvette) begins fire support.
- 10:48 Jecheon detects North Korean Styx missile electronic signals and responds.
- 10:51 The North Korean patrol boat, now on fire, is towed by another patrol boat and retreats north of the NLL.
- 10:56 All forces cease fire.
- 11:25 Jecheon and Jinhae detect North Korean Silkworm missile electronic signals and respond.
- 11:45 Casualties on Chamsuri 357 are confirmed and rescued. Chamsuri 357 is abandoned for towing due to severe hull damage.
- 11:59 Chamsuri 357 sinks.

On 29 June 2002, a North Korean patrol boat crossed the northern limit line and was warned to turn back. Shortly afterward, a second North Korean patrol craft crossed the line and it was also warned to retreat across the line. The North Korean boats began threatening and harassing the South Korean vessels following them.

After traveling 3 miles (4.8 km) south past the limit line, the North Korean vessels attacked the two South Korean patrol killer medium (PKM) boats that had been monitoring them. At 10:25, the vessel that first crossed the line opened fire with its 85 mm gun and scored a direct hit on the wheelhouse of PKM-357 causing several casualties.

The two squadrons then began a general engagement. The South Koreans using their 40 and 20 mm guns against the North Korean RPGs, 85 mm, and 37 mm guns. About ten minutes later, two more PKMs and two corvettes reinforced the South Korean vessels and severely damaged one of the North Korean craft. Now heavily outnumbered and taking casualties, the North Korean vessels retreated back across the Limit Line at 10:59.

== Aftermath ==
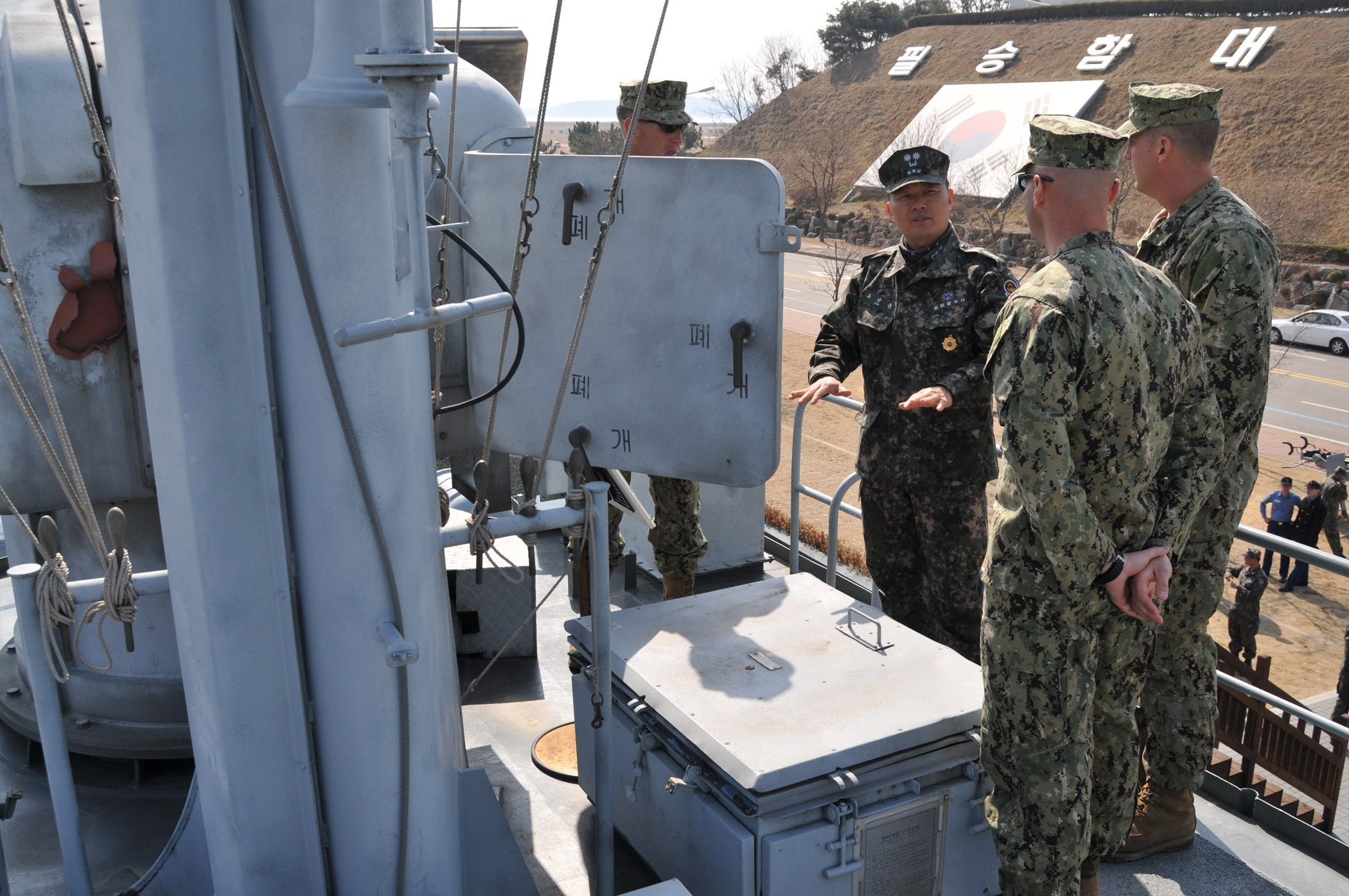
South Korean and U.S. military members discuss the sinking of the PKM 357 patrol boat on the PKM 357 museum ship in Pyeongtaek Naval Base.

Both the North Korean and South Korean flotillas took casualties from the action. Thirteen North Koreans were killed and twenty five wounded according to South Korea. The South Koreans suffered six fatalities, four during the battle, one 83 days later from wounds suffered during the battle, and one found dead at sea after the battle. The dead were Lt. Cmdr. Yoon Yeong-ha, Jo Cheon-hyung, Seo Hu-won, and Hwang Do-hyeon (during the battle), Park Dong-hyeok (days later), and Han Sang-guk (found at sea); Eighteen others were injured.

The damaged PKM-357 later sank while under tow, while the damaged North Korean vessel was able to limp its way back to port. Both sides laid blame on each other and South Korea demanded an apology from North Korea.

According to a North Korean defector's statement in 2012, the North Korean patrol boat crewmembers involved in the battle suffered extensive splinter injuries from the South Korean "Devastator" shells. The injured North Koreans were reportedly quarantined in a hospital in Pyongyang to hide the extent of the casualties suffered in the battle.

PKM 357 was later raised and towed to Pyeongtaek Naval Base, where she is now a museum ship. For display at the War Memorial of Korea, another Chamsuri-class patrol boat, PKM 301, was repainted and given faux battle damage to simulate PKM 357.

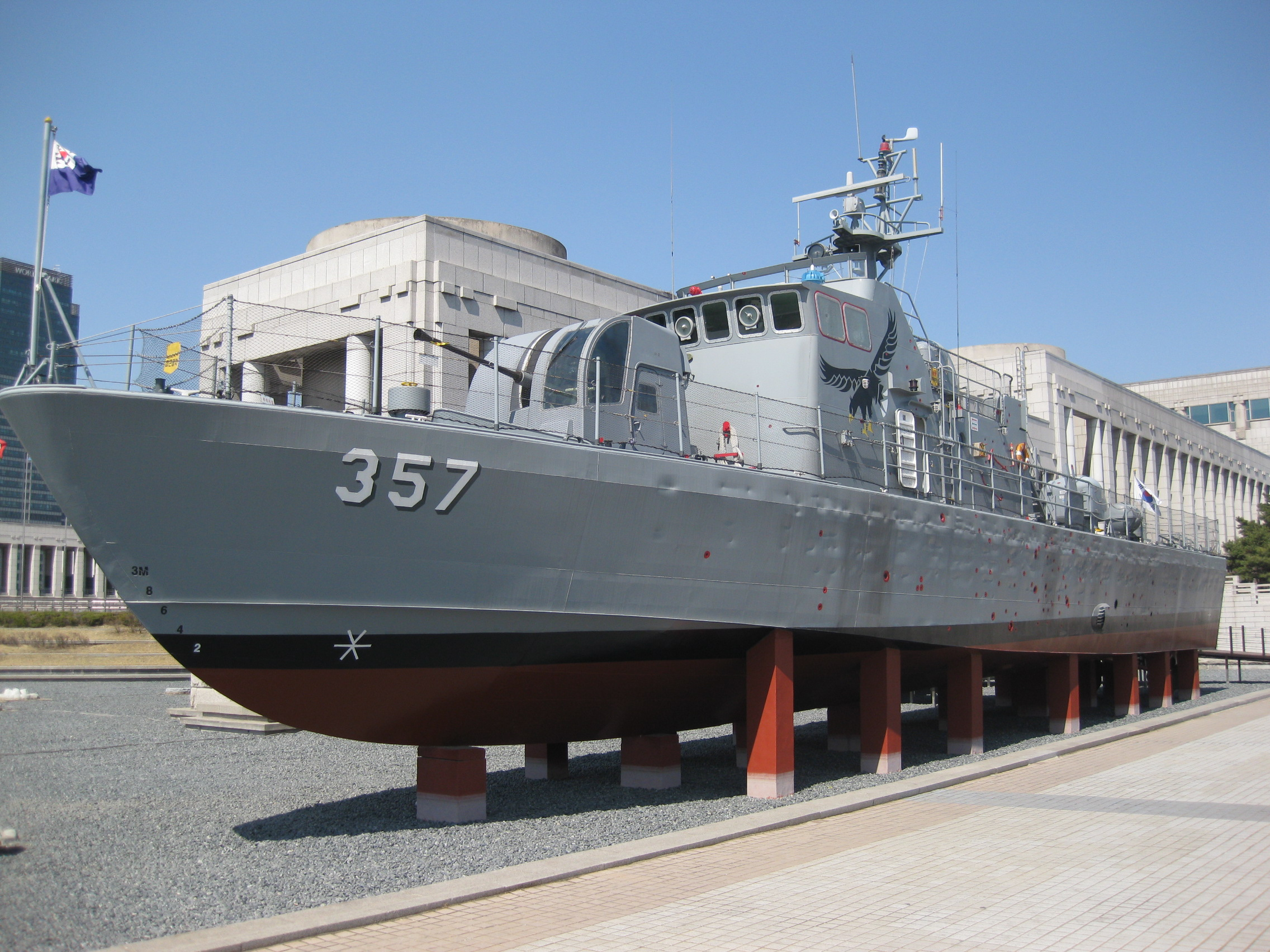
PKM 357 replica at the War Memorial of Korea, in March 2011.

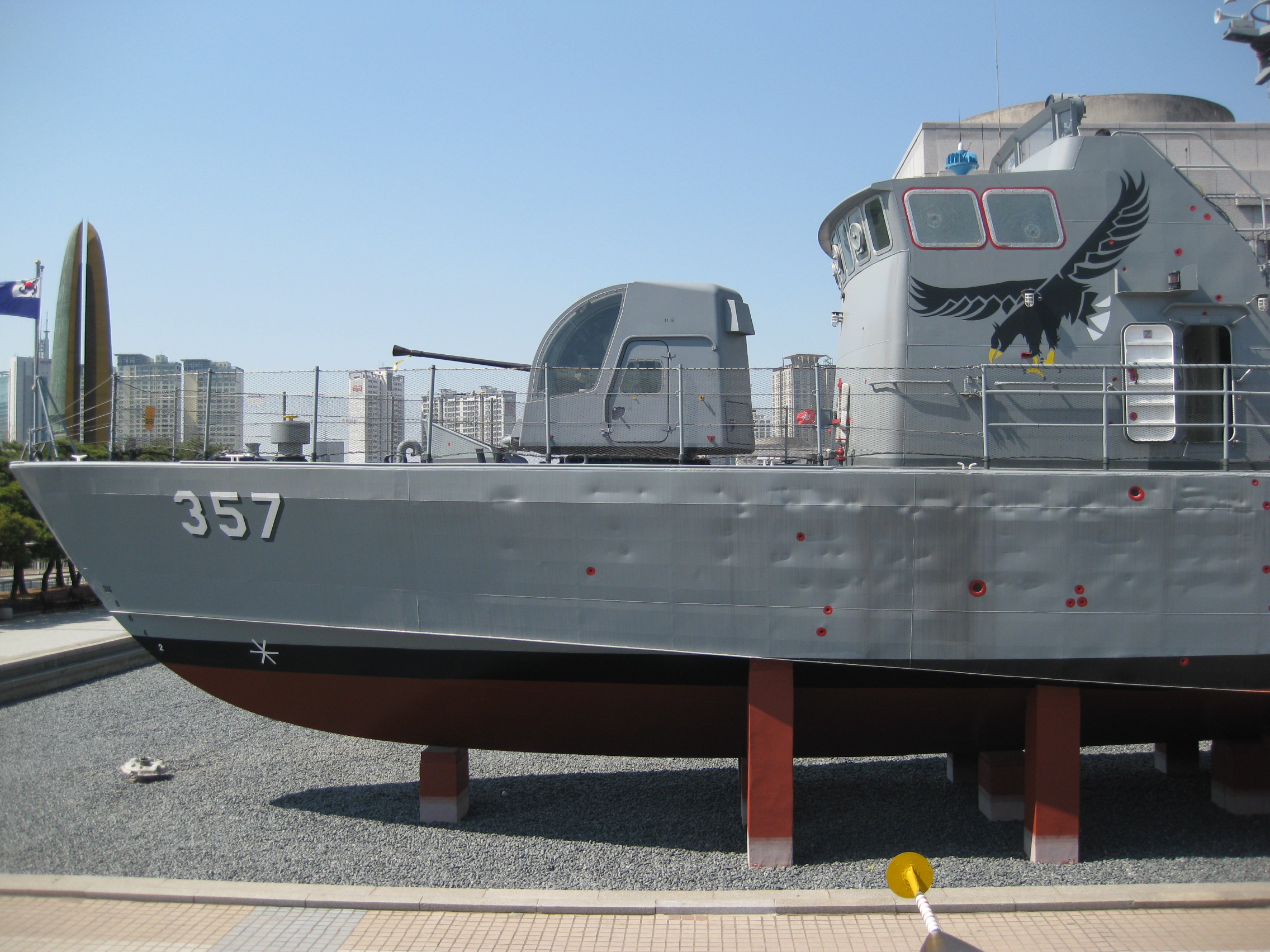
PKM 357 replica bow section. Red marks indicate simulated battle damage.

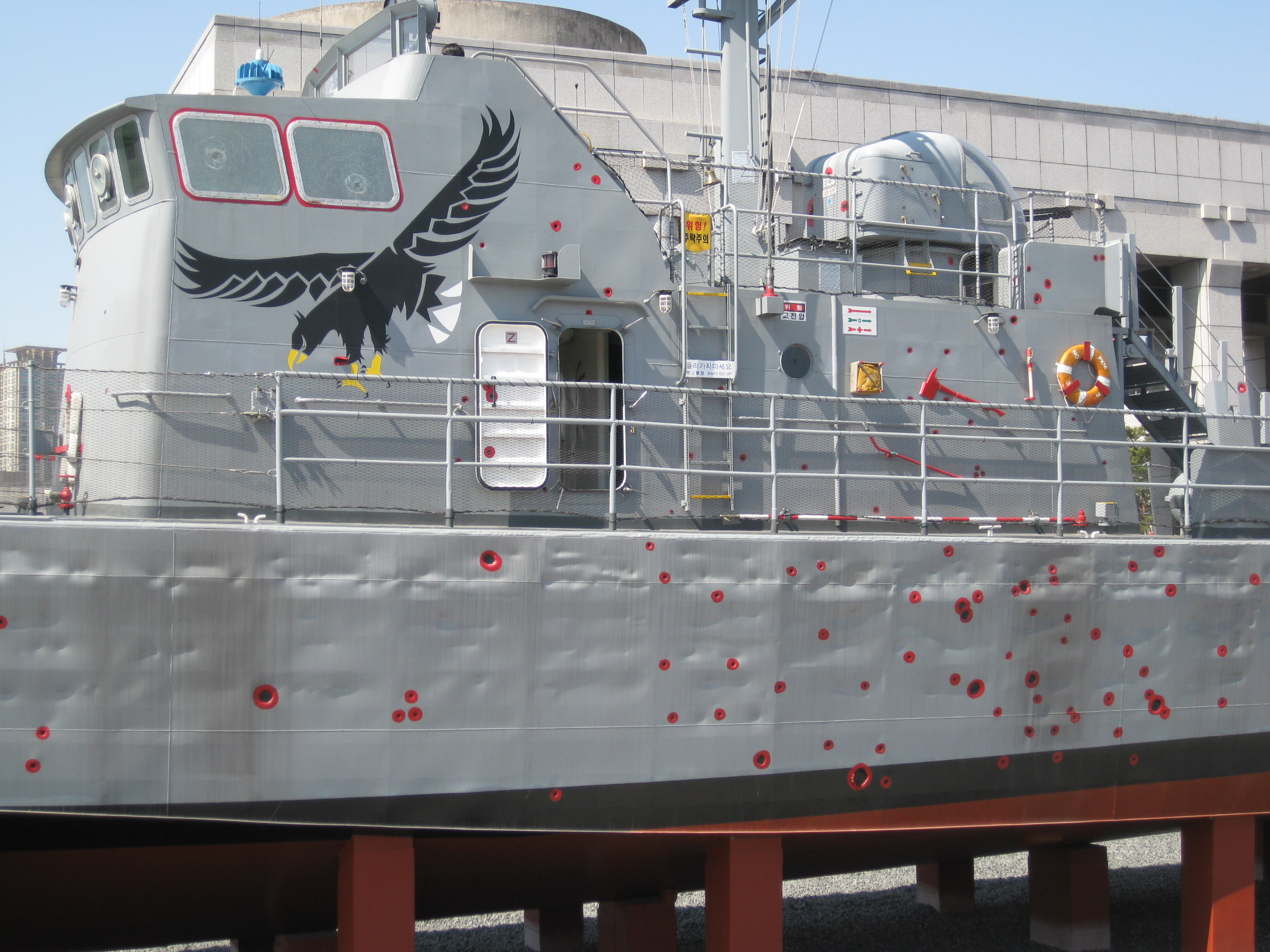
PKM 357 replica mid and Bridge section.

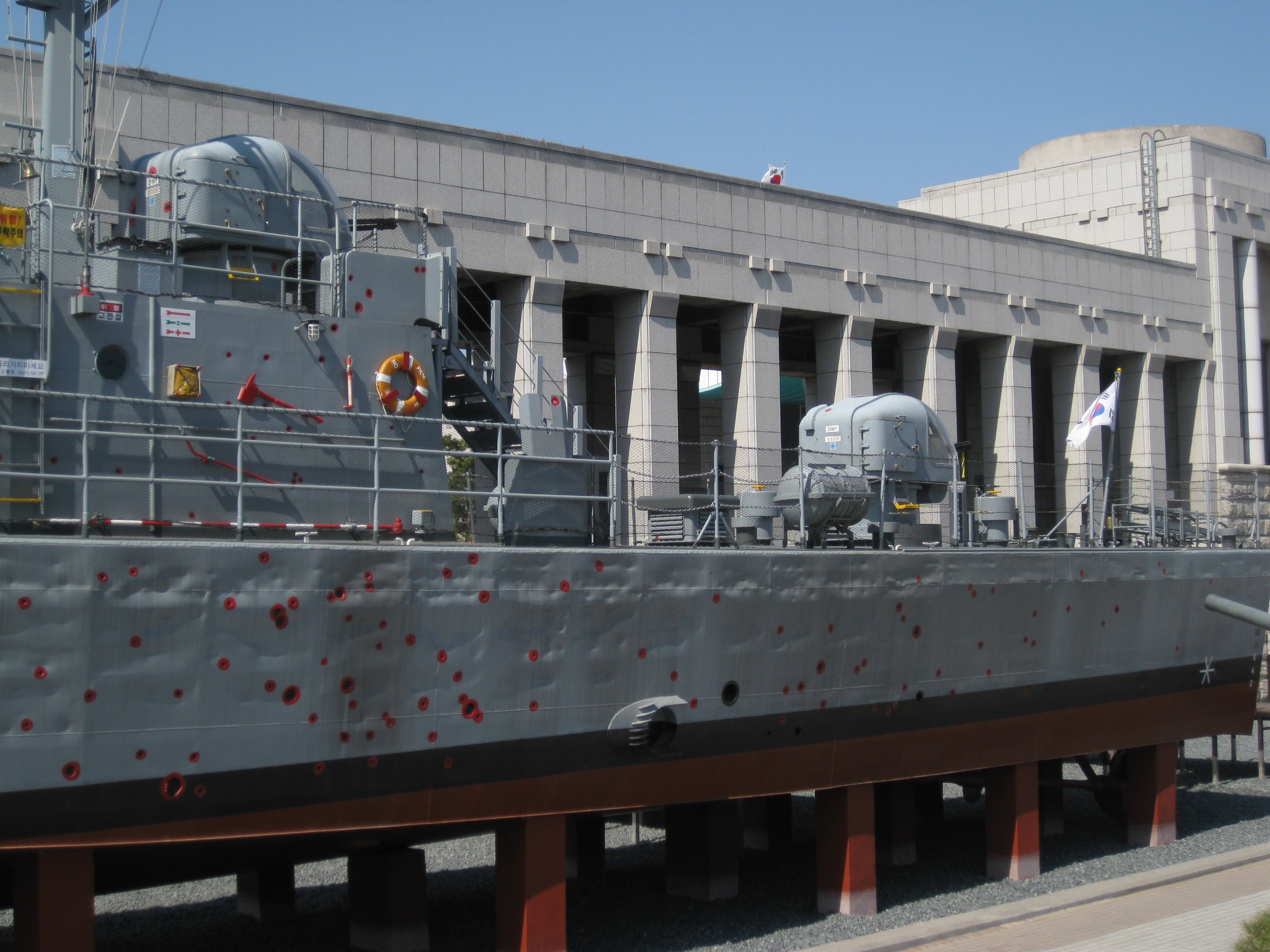
PKM 357 replica stern section.

== Search and salvage ==
Search and salvage operations, delayed by a typhoon, were postponed again and began on August 5, but bad weather delayed the main operation. On August 9, the remains of missing Chief Petty Officer Han Sang-guk were recovered from the bridge. Due to bad weather and operational difficulties, the high-speed vessel was salvaged only on August 21, 53 days after sinking. The vessel had sunk to a depth of 28m, 25.2 km west of Yeonpyeong Island. The salvaged hull had four large holes, including two in the front of the bridge, and hundreds of marks from shells and shrapnel. The national flag was still hanging on the mast behind the bridge, drawing media attention.

=== List of South Korean Casualties ===
Chief Petty Officer Han Sang-guk was found dead during the search of the hull after being missing; Corporal Park Dong-hyuk died while being treated after being evacuated. The other four were killed during the battle.

- Yoon Young-ha, Lieutenant Commander (Captain, posthumously awarded the Order of Military Merit, Chungmu)
- Han Sang-guk, Chief Petty Officer (Helmsman, posthumously awarded the Order of Military Merit, Hwarang)
- Cho Cheon-hyung, Petty Officer (Weapons Officer, posthumously awarded the Order of Military Merit, Hwarang)
- Hwang Do-hyun, Petty Officer (Weapons Officer, posthumously awarded the Order of Military Merit, Hwarang)
- Seo Hu-won, Petty Officer (Engineer, posthumously awarded the Order of Military Merit, Hwarang)
- Park Dong-hyuk, Corporal (Medical Officer, posthumously awarded the Order of Military Merit, Chungmu)

== Cause analysis ==
Reasons for South Korea's Heavy Losses

=== Firepower ===
Chamsuri high-speed vessels were equipped with 20mm Vulcan guns, 30mm autocannons, 40mm autocannons, and M60 7.62mm machine guns. However, North Korean vessels were equipped with 85mm tank guns and 14.5mm machine guns, giving them superior firepower. Although the 85mm tank gun had limited range and accuracy, a single hit could be fatal, while the weapons on Chamsuri vessels were insufficient to sink enemy ships. Despite concentrated fire from six Chamsuri vessels, Dongsan Got 684 was not sunk.

=== Defense ===
Chamsuri 357 was directly hit by an 85mm shell in the bridge, destroying the command center. Although the deputy captain took command, the weak defense exposed critical facilities such as the bridge to danger.

=== Response Maneuvers ===
When enemy vessels violated the NLL, the procedure was warning broadcast → demonstration maneuver → blocking maneuver → warning shots → suppressive fire. The blocking maneuver, especially, was vulnerable to surprise attacks, and Chamsuri 357 was attacked during this maneuver.

=== Frigate Response ===
It took a full 18 minutes after the Second Battle of Yeonpyeong began for frigates to join the battle with their 76mm rapid-fire guns. During this time, Chamsuri 357 suffered heavy damage. Initially, the frigates failed to properly assess the situation, and the Chamsuri vessels were not within their firing range. As a result, fire support was inadequate, and the North Korean high-speed vessel was not sunk.

== Controversy ==
=== Criticism of Government Response ===
- After the First Battle of Yeonpyeong, President Kim Dae-jung instructed the Navy to defend the Northern Limit Line, not to make preemptive attacks, to respond according to the rules of engagement if the enemy fired first, and not to escalate the conflict into war, forming the “four major rules of engagement.” The Navy introduced the blocking maneuver, known as the “pushing operation.” Some argue that the heavy South Korean casualties in the Second Battle of Yeonpyeong were due to President Kim's rules of engagement and the introduction of the blocking maneuver. However, even before this, the Joint Chiefs of Staff's maritime operational guidelines included five steps: warning broadcast → blocking maneuver → warning shots → threatening fire → suppressive fire, and the same engagement rules and blocking maneuver were used in the First Battle of Yeonpyeong, resulting in a major victory. At the time, Defense Minister Lee Jun stated, “President Kim issued the four guidelines during the 1999 Battle of Yeonpyeong, but these were already included in the Joint Chiefs of Staff’s operational regulations drafted in 1997 and were written according to the basic principles of the rules of engagement, not added or modified due to the Sunshine Policy.”
- There is criticism that President Kim Dae-jung convened the National Security Council (NSC) only 4 hours and 35 minutes after the Second Battle of Yeonpyeong, a slow response despite the deaths of six South Korean soldiers. The NSC, chaired by the president as commander-in-chief, concluded that the clash was accidental and accepted North Korea’s notification to the same effect. President Kim is also criticized for allowing the scheduled departure of the Kumgangsan tourist ship the day after the battle.
- Lee Hoi-chang, then opposition presidential candidate, said at a general meeting, “The government calls the West Sea provocation accidental and has asked the United States and Japan for a calm response. What kind of government is this?”
- Hwang Jang-yop posted on the North Korean Defectors Association’s website, “In the North Korean military, not even a single shot can be fired without Kim Jong-il’s approval, so it is impossible for anyone to order artillery fire without Kim Jong-il’s approval. Some say it was an impulsive act by hardliners in the North Korean military, but this is a complete misunderstanding of North Korea.”
- Professor Cho Kuk, in his co-authored book 《Progressive Government Plan》 with Oh Yeon-ho, wrote, “A naval battle was taking place in the west, while tourists were leaving for Kumgangsan in the east—a contradictory situation that the people had to accept.”
- On June 30, the day after the Second Battle of Yeonpyeong, President Kim Dae-jung departed for Saitama, Japan, to attend the World Cup final. He held a summit with Japanese Prime Minister Junichiro Koizumi, agreeing that it was important to respond calmly to the West Sea naval incident and to prevent heightened tension on the Korean Peninsula, and stated, “We will continue to maintain the policy of engagement with North Korea.” Meanwhile, bereaved families and survivors were angered by President Kim's attitude. Park Nam-joon, father of the late Corporal Park Dong-hyuk, said, “While waiting to visit my injured son, I saw the president applauding in Japan on TV. It only takes a few minutes from Seongnam Air Base to the Armed Forces Capital Hospital.” Yun Du-ho, father of Lieutenant Commander Yun Young-ha, criticized, “Even now, I cannot understand why the president left the country after the West Sea battle. If war breaks out, the president must return, even if he is abroad. That is a normal country.”
- Even two days after the battle, when a joint funeral was held at the Armed Forces Capital Hospital, President Kim did not attend, nor did key officials such as the prime minister, defense minister, or chairman of the Joint Chiefs of Staff. The Ministry of Defense explained, “It is customary for only the funeral committee to attend military funerals,” and the Prime Minister's Office said, “There was no request to attend, and we did not attend due to protocol.” President Kim also did not attend the memorial service for the Second Battle of Yeonpyeong.
- Jack Pritchard, former U.S. special envoy for Korean Peninsula peace talks, criticized in his book “Failed Diplomacy” that the Kim Dae-jung (DJ) administration ignored the sacrifice of six naval personnel and clung only to the Sunshine Policy. At the time, the George W. Bush administration considered postponing a planned visit to Pyongyang by a U.S. negotiating team scheduled for July 10 due to the West Sea naval incident, but the South Korean government instead requested that the visit proceed as planned. Unable to accept this, the U.S. government warned South Korea that it would not allow it to deal with North Korea as if nothing had happened. The U.S. government postponed the visit, and Pritchard described U.S.-South Korea relations at the time as “bizarre.”

=== Compensation Controversy ===
Families of the Second Battle of Yeonpyeong victims received compensation, pensions, and severance pay. For example, Lieutenant Commander Yun's family received over 100 million KRW (including 56 million KRW in death compensation), while other families received about 60 million KRW (including about 31 million KRW in death compensation). Conservative groups criticized the government and the Ministry of Gender Equality for the low compensation, but at the time, the government could not provide additional compensation due to legal regulations. In 2002, the Military Pension Act did not distinguish between death in the line of duty and death in combat, so all were treated as public official deaths, making additional compensation impossible. Therefore, the government provided indirect support through national donations, and the six soldiers received a total of 350 million KRW in compensation, including government support.

The problematic Military Pension Act was enacted during the Park Chung-hee administration, when the number of wartime deaths during the Vietnam War increased, and the government, concerned about depleting the national treasury, stipulated that deaths in combat would be treated as deaths in the line of duty, with death compensation limited to 36 times the monthly salary before death. Additionally, in 1967, Article 2 of the National Compensation Act was enacted, stipulating that if compensation is received for damages incurred during duty, the state cannot be sued for damages even if the state is at fault.

In July 2002, the Ministry of Defense, in response to criticism that compensation for the fallen was too low, announced that it would amend the Military Pension Act and related regulations to allow compensation for “death in combat with the enemy,” separating it from “death in the line of duty.” In January 2004, the Ministry of Defense announced that the amended Military Pension Act, which had been under revision, would apply to all combat deaths at home and abroad. However, this did not apply retroactively to the Second Battle of Yeonpyeong victims. Thus, families of the Second Battle of Yeonpyeong victims received only 30–60 million KRW in compensation for public official deaths, not the 200 million KRW combat death compensation.

In May 2010, the Ministry of Defense stated, “To provide retroactive combat death compensation to Second Battle of Yeonpyeong victims, a special law must be enacted.” In 2010, during the Lee Myung-bak administration, a special law to honor the Second Battle of Yeonpyeong victims was proposed but failed. On October 14, the Ministry of Defense's Reserve Policy Development Task Force notified that it could not honor the Second Battle of Yeonpyeong victims as combat deaths. The notice stated, “There are concerns about fairness with other combat deaths, such as infiltration operations, local wars, and North Korean provocations, so retroactive compensation is not possible for legal stability.” In the case of the Cheonan sinking (March 2010), families received 200 million KRW in death compensation for enlisted personnel and 359 million KRW for master chief petty officers under the 2004 amended Military Pension Act.

After the Moon Jae-in administration took office, the “Special Act on Compensation for the Second Battle of Yeonpyeong” was enacted and implemented in July 2018, allowing each family to receive an additional 140 to 180 million KRW in compensation.

== Aftercare and social aftermath ==
=== Government Measures ===
People's Government

On June 30, 2002, the Kim Dae-jung administration posthumously promoted and awarded medals to five Navy personnel who were killed or missing in action. On the same day, Prime Minister Lee Han-dong and cabinet members, National Assembly members, and military personnel visited the joint memorial altar at the Armed Forces Capital Hospital. The prime minister and 21 cabinet members paid their respects and awarded the Order of Military Merit, Chungmu, to the late Lieutenant Commander Yun Young-ha and the Order of Military Merit, Hwarang, to the four other deceased or missing soldiers. The prime minister then visited the wards to shake hands with and encourage the 19 injured soldiers, saying, “You fought well. You were brave.”

On July 2, 2002, after returning from Japan, President Kim Dae-jung warned, “If North Korea tries to harm us with military force again, North Korea will suffer even greater damage.” He then visited the Armed Forces Capital Hospital to console the soldiers injured in the West Sea naval incident. One month after the battle, on July 23, President Kim invited the families of the five killed or missing soldiers (12 people) to the Blue House to console them.

Participatory Government

On June 25, 2003, ahead of the first anniversary of the incident, President Roh Moo-hyun invited bereaved families and national meritorious persons to the Blue House for a consolation event. On June 27, 2003, he visited the 2nd Fleet and paid his respects at the Chamsuri 357 displayed in the Security Park. He also called to console Lieutenant Lee Hee-wan, who had lost a leg but returned to duty, and sent gifts to bereaved families on holidays.

Lee Myung-bak Government

The Ministry of National Defense, which had previously referred to the incident as the West Sea Naval Incident, officially renamed it the Second Battle of Yeonpyeong in April 2008. At the same time, the memorial service was upgraded to a government-sponsored event, with the organizing agency changed from the Navy's 2nd Fleet Command to the Ministry of Patriots and Veterans Affairs.

President Lee Myung-bak attended the 10th anniversary event in 2012, marking the first time a commander-in-chief attended a Second Battle of Yeonpyeong-related event since 2002.

=== Prevention of Recurrence and Response ===
Revision of Response Maneuvers

The five-step response procedure led to Navy losses. Chamsuri 357 was also attacked during the blocking maneuver. The previous procedure was warning broadcast → demonstration maneuver → blocking maneuver (pushing operation) → warning shots → suppressive fire. The main problem was the “blocking maneuver,” which was most vulnerable to surprise attacks. The Ministry of National Defense removed the blocking maneuver in July 2002 and, in 2004, combined the demonstration maneuver and warning broadcast, revising the procedure to three steps: warning broadcast/demonstration maneuver → warning shots → suppressive fire. This became the basis for the victory in the 2009 Battle of Daecheong.

Patrol Activities

Learning from the late response of frigates and heavy losses in the Second Battle of Yeonpyeong, Chamsuri high-speed vessels were required to operate within the firing range of frigates to improve response.

Improvement Projects

The Ministry of National Defense, after seeing Chamsuri 357 destroyed by an 85mm shell in the bridge, ordered improvements to defense. As a result, 45 Chamsuri high-speed vessels of the 1st and 2nd Fleets were upgraded for enhanced defense. Firepower was improved by replacing M60 (7.62mm) machine guns with K6 (12.7mm) machine guns. To replace the 30-year-old Chamsuri vessels, the PKX-A was developed and named the “Yoon Young-ha class high-speed vessel,” launched in 2007. Since the Chamsuri's strongest weapon was only a 40mm autocannon, making it difficult to sink enemy ships, the Yun Young-ha class was equipped with a 76mm rapid-fire gun and anti-ship missiles.

=== Commemoration ===
Exhibition

The Navy concluded that the salvaged Chamsuri 357 could not be reused due to structural distortion and long-term submersion and decided to display it at the 2nd Fleet Command in Pyeongtaek.

Film Production

In October 2013, the film 《NLL—Battle of Yeonpyeong》 was scheduled for release. Directed by Kim Hak-soon and starring Kim Mu-yeol and Jin Goo, the production was reported by the Chosun Ilbo to have received no production funding. As a result, production costs were covered by donations from the Navy and the general public. With talent donations from the cast and crew, it was said that 1.5 billion KRW would be enough for a 3D war film, but only 250 million KRW was raised through the first and second rounds of crowdfunding and individual investors. Despite the lack of funds, filming began on April 22, 2013, and production costs were covered by a third round of crowdfunding.

The film was released as Northern Limit Line on June 24, 2015.

== Related incident log ==
- June 15, 1999 – First Battle of Yeonpyeong
  - From June 7 to June 15, 1999, North Korean patrol boats crossed the NLL up to 10 km repeatedly.
  - The South Korean Navy responded by using Chamsuri-class high-speed vessels to block North Korean patrol boats by colliding with their hulls, known as the “blocking maneuver.”
  - On June 15, North Korean patrol boat Dongsan Got 684 launched a preemptive attack, starting the First Battle of Yeonpyeong. Dongsan Got 684 was partially destroyed and fled after being counterattacked by South Korean Navy's Chamsuri 325.
  - Captain Ahn Ji-young (then lieutenant) of Chamsuri 325 was injured and became known as the “hero of the Battle of Yeonpyeong.”
  - North Korean casualties: At least 30 killed, over 70 injured, one sunk, one partially destroyed (CNN report on the day).
  - North Korea appointed the deck officer of Dongsan Got 684, who survived the battle, as the new captain.
- June 15, 2000 – 2000 Inter-Korean Summit held. June 15 Joint Declaration announced.
- June 29, 2002 – Second Battle of Yeonpyeong.
  - South Korean Navy's Chamsuri 357 sunk, 6 killed, 19 injured.
  - North Korea appointed the deck officer of Dongsan Got 684, who survived the First Battle of Yeonpyeong, as the new captain and again illegally crossed the NLL.
  - Due to the surprise attack by Dongsan Got 684's 85mm anti-aircraft gun, six South Korean Navy personnel, including Captain Yun Young-ha, were killed.
  - The captain of Dongsan Got 684 was killed by the South Korean Navy's counterattack and was honored as a hero.
- 2004 – The South Korean Navy, following the Battle of Yeonpyeong, revised the rules of engagement from passive response to active engagement.
  - The five-step response of “warning broadcast → demonstration maneuver → blocking maneuver (pushing operation) → warning shots → suppressive fire” was revised to a three-step response: “warning broadcast and demonstration maneuver → warning shots → suppressive fire.”
- January 2004 – Repairs completed on the partially destroyed Dongsan Got 684, renamed “Hero Kim Young-sik.”
- July 2004 – Dongsan Got 684 again crossed the NLL, received warning shots from the South Korean Navy, and fled north.
- November 2009 – North Korean patrol boat crossed the NLL, received warning shots from the South Korean Navy, and responded with suppressive fire, resulting in a battle. The North Korean patrol boat was partially destroyed and retreated north, with no South Korean casualties. See the Daecheong incidentg.
- November 2010 – North Korea attacked Yeonpyeong Island, killing two South Korean Marines and two civilians. See the Yeonpyeongdo bombardment.

== In popular culture ==
- Northern Limit Line, a 2015 South Korean war film based on the battle

== See also ==
- 1999 Yeonpyeong incident
- Daecheong incident
- ROKS Cheonan sinking
- Shelling of Yeonpyeong
- 1996 Gangneung submarine infiltration incident
