= GNS Stephen Otu =

Chamsuri-class vessel of the Ghana Navy

History

South Korea
- Name: PKM 237
- Builder: Korea Tacoma, Chinghae
- Commissioned: 1982
- Decommissioned: 2008
- Fate: Transferred to Ghana

Ghana
- Name: Stephen Otu
- Namesake: Stephen Otu
- Acquired: 2011
- Commissioned: 21 January 2011
- Status: In service

General characteristics
- Class & type: Chamsuri-class patrol boat
- Displacement: 113 t (111 long tons) light; 156 t (154 long tons) full load
- Length: 33.10 m (108 ft 7 in)
- Beam: 6.92 m (22 ft 8 in)
- Draft: 1.75 m (5 ft 9 in)
- Propulsion: 2 × MTU MD538 TU90 diesel engines; 2 propellers
- Speed: 38 knots (70 km/h; 44 mph)
- Range: 1,000 nmi (1,900 km; 1,200 mi) at 20 knots (37 km/h; 23 mph)
- Complement: 31
- Sensors & processing systems: 1 × STX RadarSys SPS-100k surface search radar; 1 × Saab CEROS fire radar and optronic sight
- Electronic warfare & decoys: 2 × KDAGAIE Mk2 decoys
- Armament: 1 × Bofors 40 mm gun; 2 × Sea Vulcan (late model)

GNS Stephen Otu is a Chamsuri-class offshore patrol vessel in service with the Ghana Navy. The vessel was originally built by Korea Tacoma for the Republic of Korea Navy (ROKN) as ROKS PKM 237 . In 2011, PKM 237, was transferred to the Ghanaian Navy and renamed Stephen Otu as a donation. The vessel's primary purposes include maritime domain awareness, law enforcement, vessel inspection, naval development, search and rescue, and small boat maintenance. Various illicit activities the vessel is designed to prevent within Ghanaian territorial waters include piracy, illegal, unreported and unregulated fishing, drug trafficking, and oil bunkering.

== Design and description ==
The Chamsuri-class patrol boats were designed in the 1970s as the basis for South Korea's coastal defense against North Korean amphibious incursions. The ships measure 33.10 meters (108 ft 7 in) long overall and 31.25 m (102 ft 6 in) at the waterline with a beam of 6.92 m (22 ft 8 in) and a draft of 1.75 m (5 ft 9 in) and 2.45 m (8 ft 0 in) at the propellers. The Chamsuris have a light displacement of 113 tonnes (111 long tons) and 156 t (154 long tons) at full load. The ships have a complement of 31 including 5 officers.

The patrol boats are powered by two MTU 16V MD538 TU90 diesel engines turning two propellers creating 10,800 brake horsepower (8,100 kW) or 9,000 bhp (6,700 kW) sustained. The ships have two 50 kW diesel generator sets for electricity production. The Chamsuris were designed for a maximum speed of 38 knots (70 km/h; 44 mph) but can sustain a speed of 32 knots (59 km/h; 37 mph). The ships have a range of 500 nautical miles (930 km; 580 mi) at 32 knots or 1,000 nmi (1,900 km; 1,200 mi) at 20 knots (37 km/h; 23 mph). The ship carries 15 tonnes (15 long tons; 17 short tons) of fuel.

In Korean service, the ship was armed with a single 40-millimeter (1.6 in) gun, a pair of 30 mm (1.2 in) Emerlac anti-aircraft (AA) guns situated in a single mount, two single-mounted 20 mm (0.79 in) AA guns and two single-mounted 12.7 mm (0.50 in) machine guns. The vessel was equipped with Raytheon 1645 navigational/surface search radar.

== Construction and career ==
The ship was constructed by Korea Tacoma Marine Industries at Chinghae in 1982. Entering service that year as PKM 237, the ship remained operational until 2008. In 2010 South Korea entered into negotiations with Ghana over the donation of the ship to the African nation. PKM 237 arrived at Tema, Ghana on 9 December 2010. On 21 January 2011, the ship was formally transferred to Ghana, renamed Stephen Otu and commissioned into the Ghana Navy at Sekondi Naval Base. The vessel's namesake is late Major General Stephen Otu, the first Ghanaian Chief of Defence Staff. In Ghanaian service, Stephen Otu mission includes maritime domain awareness, law enforcement, vessel inspection, naval development, search and rescue, and small boat maintenance. Various illicit activities the vessel is designed to prevent within Ghanaian territorial waters include piracy, illegal, unreported and unregulated fishing, drug trafficking, and oil bunkering.
