= Chamsuri-class patrol boat =

Ship class

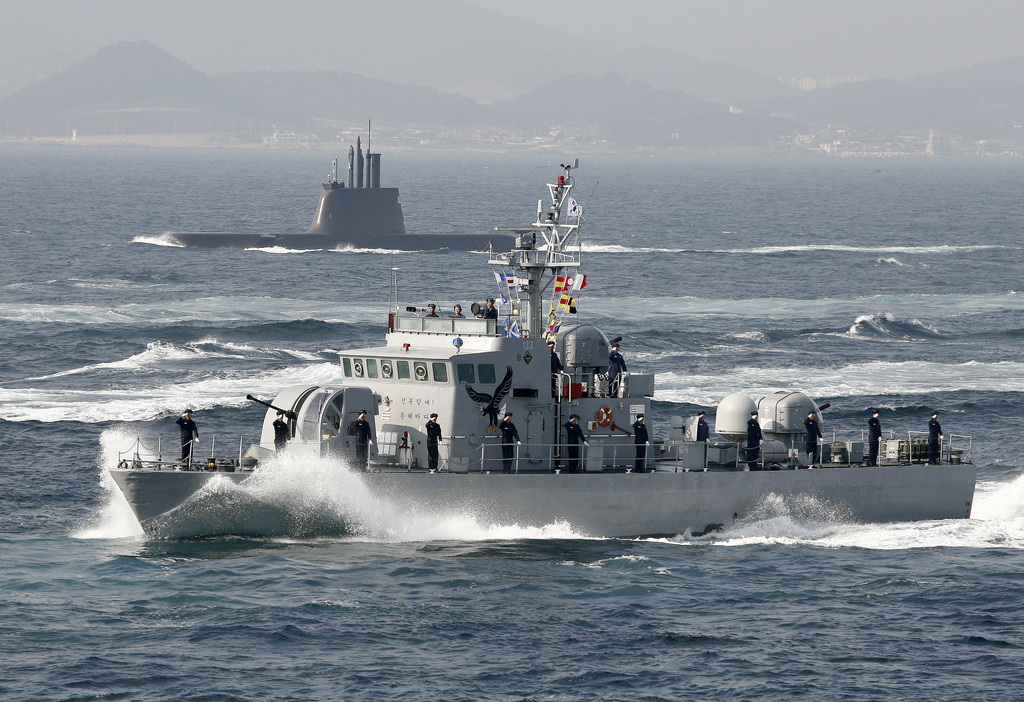
- Chamsuri-class patrol vessel of the Republic of Korea Navy

Class overview
- Name: Chamsuri class
- Builders: Korea Tacoma; Hanjin Heavy Industries
- Operators: Republic of Korea Navy; Bangladesh Navy; Ghana Navy; Kazakh Naval Forces; Philippine Navy; (Timor-Leste) Timor Leste Defence Force; Nigerian Navy
- Preceded by: Asheville class
- Succeeded by: Gumdoksuri class
- Subclasses: PKM 201 class; PKM 301 class
- Built: 1970s–1980s
- Completed: 101
- Active: 52
- Lost: 3
- Retired: 49
- Preserved: 1

General characteristics as built (PKM 301 class)
- Type: Patrol vessel
- Displacement: 113 t (111 long tons) light; 156 t (154 long tons) full load
- Length: 33.10 m (108 ft 7 in)
- Beam: 6.92 m (22 ft 8 in)
- Draft: 1.75 m (5 ft 9 in)
- Propulsion: 2 × MTU 16V 538 TB90 diesel engines
- Speed: 38 knots (70 km/h; 44 mph) max
- Range: 1,000 nmi (1,900 km; 1,200 mi) at 20 knots (37 km/h; 23 mph)
- Complement: 31
- Sensors & processing systems: Raytheon 1645 surface search radar
- Armament: 1 × 40 mm (1.6 in) gun; 2 × single Sea Vulcan 20 mm (0.79 in) Gatling guns; 2 × single 12.7 mm (0.50 in) M2 Browning machine guns

The Chamsuri class (Korean: 참수리급 고속정) (also known as the "Sea Dolphin" and "Wildcat" types) are patrol boats originally constructed for and operated by the Republic of Korea Navy. They first entered service in 1979, and they have since seen service with five other navies, of which the Philippine Navy is currently the largest import user. These boats were built by the Korea Tacoma, and Korea SB & Eng. Masan shipyards. In South Korea, the Chamsuri-class boats are being retired and replaced by Gumdoksuri-class patrol vessels.

== Design and description ==
The Chamsuri class were designed in the 1970s as the basis for South Korea's coastal defense against North Korean amphibious incursions. The Chamsuri class comes in two designs with differing armament. The PKM 201 subclass ("PKM" stands for "patrol killer medium") mounted lighter armament than the PKM 301 subclass. The subclasses were also known as the "Sea Dolphin" and "Wildcat" types respectively. The ships measure 33.10 meters (108 ft 7 in) long overall and 31.25 m (102 ft 6 in) at the waterline with a beam of 6.92 m (22 ft 8 in) and a draft of 1.75 m (5 ft 9 in) and 2.45 m (8 ft 0 in) at the propellers. The Chamsuris have a light displacement of 113 tonnes (111 long tons) and 156 t (154 long tons) at full load. The ships have a complement of 31 including 5 officers.

The patrol boats are powered by two MTU 16V MD538 TU90 diesel engines turning two propellers creating 10,800 brake horsepower (8,100 kW) or 9,000 bhp (6,700 kW) sustained. The ships have two 50 kW diesel generator sets for electricity production. The Chamsuris were designed for a maximum speed of 38 knots (70 km/h; 44 mph) but can sustain a speed of 32 knots (59 km/h; 37 mph). The ships have a range of 500 nautical miles (930 km; 580 mi) at 32 knots or 1,000 nmi (1,900 km; 1,200 mi) at 20 knots (37 km/h; 23 mph). The patrol boats carry 15 tonnes (15 long tons; 17 short tons) of fuel.

In Korean service, the early PKM 201 series ships were armed with a single Bofors 40-millimeter (1.6 in)/L60 Mk3 gun, a pair of 30 mm (1.2 in)/75 Emerlac anti-aircraft (AA) EX 30 guns situated in a single mount and two single-mounted Oerlikon 20mm L/70 Mk10 AA guns. Later PKM 201-class vessels mounted the twin 30 mm/75 Emerlac EX 30 guns and one or two single-mounted Sea Vulcan 20 mm (0.79 in) Gatling guns and two single-mounted 12.7 mm (0.50 in) M2 Browning machine guns. The PKM 301 subclass were equipped with the Bofors 40 mm/L60 gun, the two single-mounted Sea Vulcans and the single-mounted 12.7 mm machine guns. (Note: Couhat and Gardiner, Chumbley & Budzbon both state that the PKM 301 series had two single-mounted MM 38 Exocet anti-ship missiles installed.)

On the PKM 301 class, the ships' had their 40 mm mount enclosed and situated on the forecastle and one Vulcan mount atop the superstructure and the other located on the fantail. The enclosures were Mauser glass-reinforced plastic shields. Ships of the PKM 201 series had their power-operated twin 30 mm mount located on the forecastle and some of the older units had their 40 mm mount situated on the fantail. The vessels were equipped with Raytheon 1645 navigational/surface search radar.

== South Korean service ==
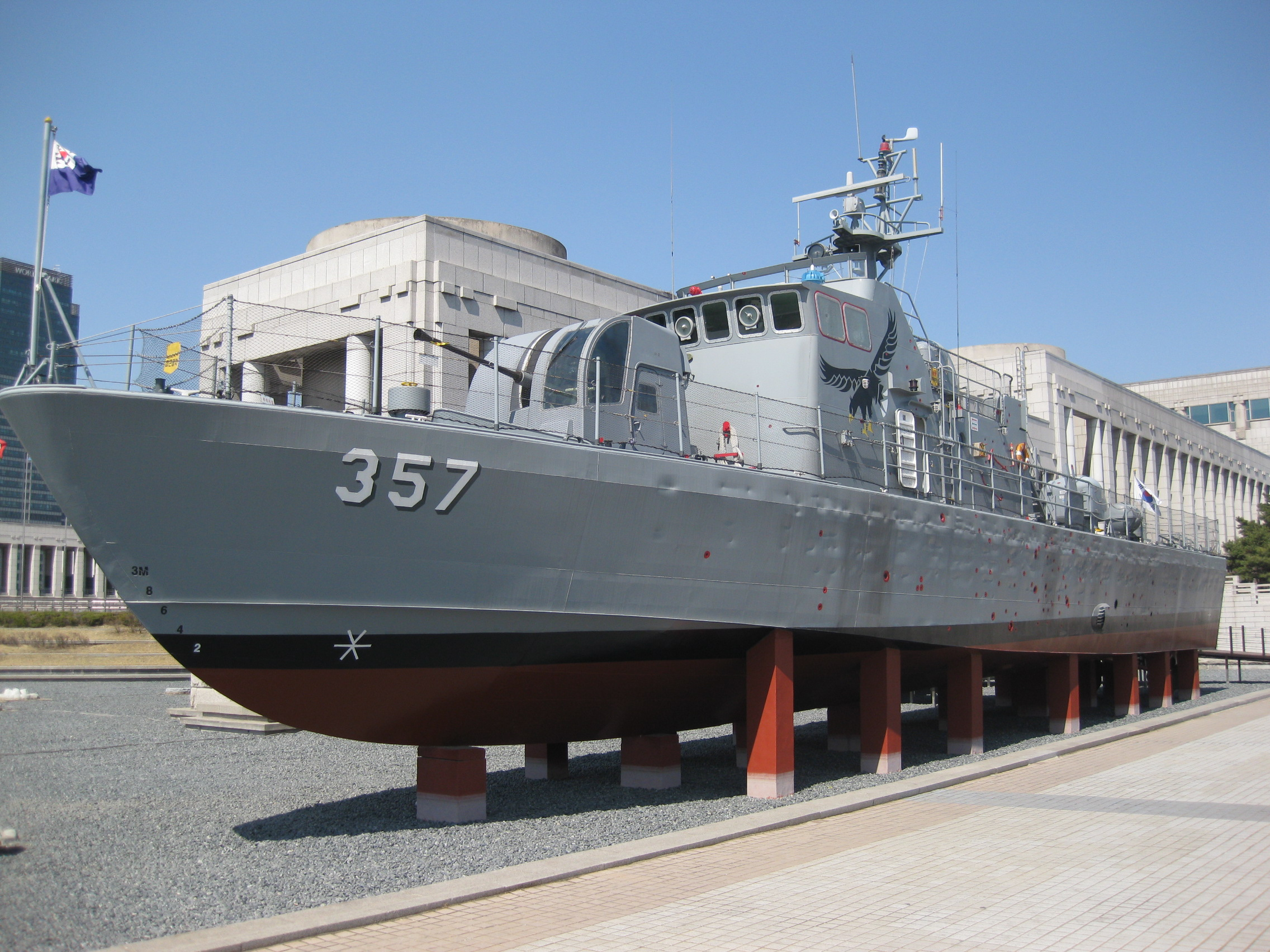
PKM 357 at the War Memorial of Korea

54 vessels of the "Sea Dolphin" type and 47 vessels of the "Wildcat" type were constructed for the Republic of Korea Navy (ROKN). They were constructed at the shipyards Korea SB (later known as Hanjin Heavy Industries and HJ Shipbuilding) and Korea Tacoma. The first entered service in 1971–1972. By 2013, there were only 74 craft in service with the ROKN. In 2002, a Chamsuri-class patrol boat, PKM 357 was sunk during the Battle of Yeonpyeong versus North Korean forces. A reproduction of the vessel was created and turned into a museum ship at the War Memorial of Korea. The Chamsuris are being replaced in Korean service by the Yoon Youngha class (also known as the PKG class or Gumdoksuri class).

== Export ==
The designers of the class, Daewoo, initially offered an export version, called the Dangpo class, but there were no buyers. The design called for a ship 150 t (150 long tons) at full load with a length overall of 37 m (121 ft 5 in), capable of making 37 knots (69 km/h; 43 mph) with a range of 600 nmi (1,100 km; 690 mi) at 20 knots (37 km/h; 23 mph).

=== In Bangladeshi service ===
The Bangladesh Navy operated four Chamsuris. The first two (P1011 and P1012) were acquired in April 2000 and formally transferred from South Korea on 27 May 2000. The second pair (P1013 and P1014) entered service on 3 October 2004. All four are "Sea Dolphin"/PKM 201 type. They were transferred to the Bangladesh Coast Guard for service.

Bangladeshi Chamsuri class construction data
Pennant number	Name	Acquired	Commissioned	Status
P1011	Titas	April 2000	27 May 2000	In service
P1012	Kusiyara	April 2000	27 May 2000	In service
P1013	Chitra	2004	3 October 2004	In service
P1014	Dhansiri	2004	3 October 2004	In service

=== In Timorese service ===
A Chamsuri-class ship was one of three patrol vessels transferred by South Korea to the Naval Component of East Timor's F-FDTL in September 2011, on the basis of a transfer agreement signed in Seoul the previous month. The vessel, re-christened Kamenassa, was of the "Sea Dolphin"/PKM 201 type.

Timor-Leste Chamsuri class construction data
Pennant number	Name	Acquired	Commissioned	Status
P217	Kamenassa	August 2011	26 September 2011	Sunk as a dive wreck 15 July 2023

=== In Ghanaian service ===
One vessel was transferred in 2011.

Ghanaian Chamsuri class construction data
Pennant number	Name	Acquired	Commissioned	Status
P33	Stephen Otu (ex-PKM 237)	2010	21 January 2011	In service

=== In Kazakh service ===
Kazakhstan announced the transfer of three Chamsuri-class vessels in April 2005. The three ships were received on 27 March 2006. They were purchased for a token amount of $100 per ship. As part of the agreement, all armament was removed along with the identification friend or foe system.

Kazakh Chamsuri class construction data
Pennant number	Name	Acquired	Commissioned	Status
RK-031	Shapshan	April 2005	27 March 2006	
RK-032	Batyr	April 2005	27 March 2006	
RK-033	Ozhet (ex-PKM 233)	April 2005	27 March 2006	

=== In Philippine service ===
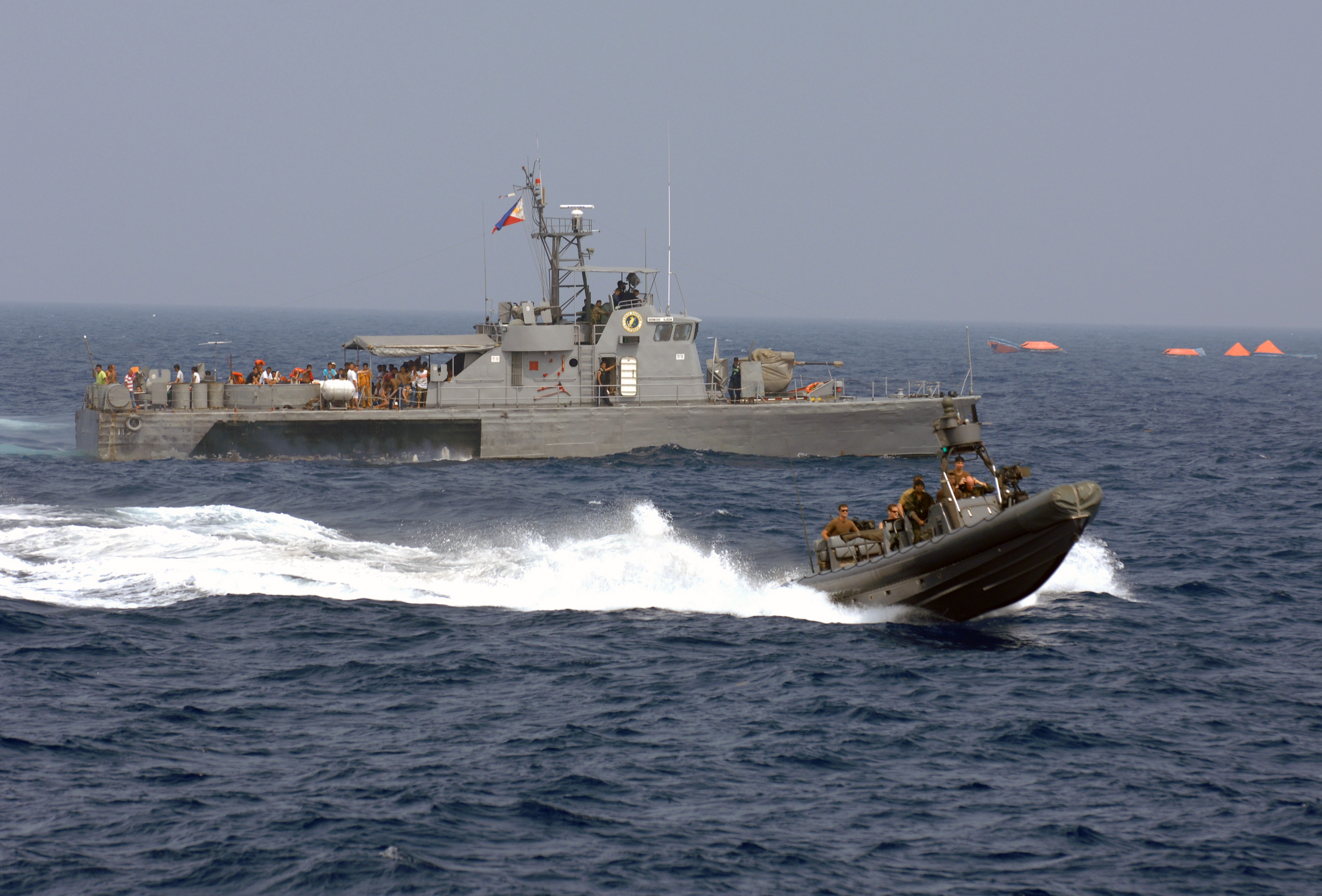
BRP Dioniso Ojeda of the Philippine Navy

At least eight Chamsuris were transferred to the Philippines. The first five, PKM 225, PKM 226, PKM 229, PKM 231, and PKM 235, were transferred in 1995. Four were commissioned the following year, with one (ex-PKM 235) cannibalized for spare parts. Another unit was transferred in 1998. An additional two ships, PKM 223 and PKM 232, were acquired in 2006.

Chamsuris in Philippine Navy service are collectively referred to as the Tomas Batilo class, named after Filipino officers and soldiers who served with distinction during the Korean War. As of 1 March 2021, all ships of the class have been withdrawn from active service in the Philippine Navy.

=== In Nigerian service ===
A single Chamsuri-class patrol boat was gifted to the Nigerian Navy, renamed NNS Ikogosi in Nigerian service and commissioned on 31 May 2025.

Nigerian Chamsuri class construction data
Pennant number	Name	Acquired	Commissioned	Status
P165	Ikogosi	2025	31 May 2025	In service
