= Yoon Youngha-class patrol vessel =

Ship class of the Republic of Korea Navy

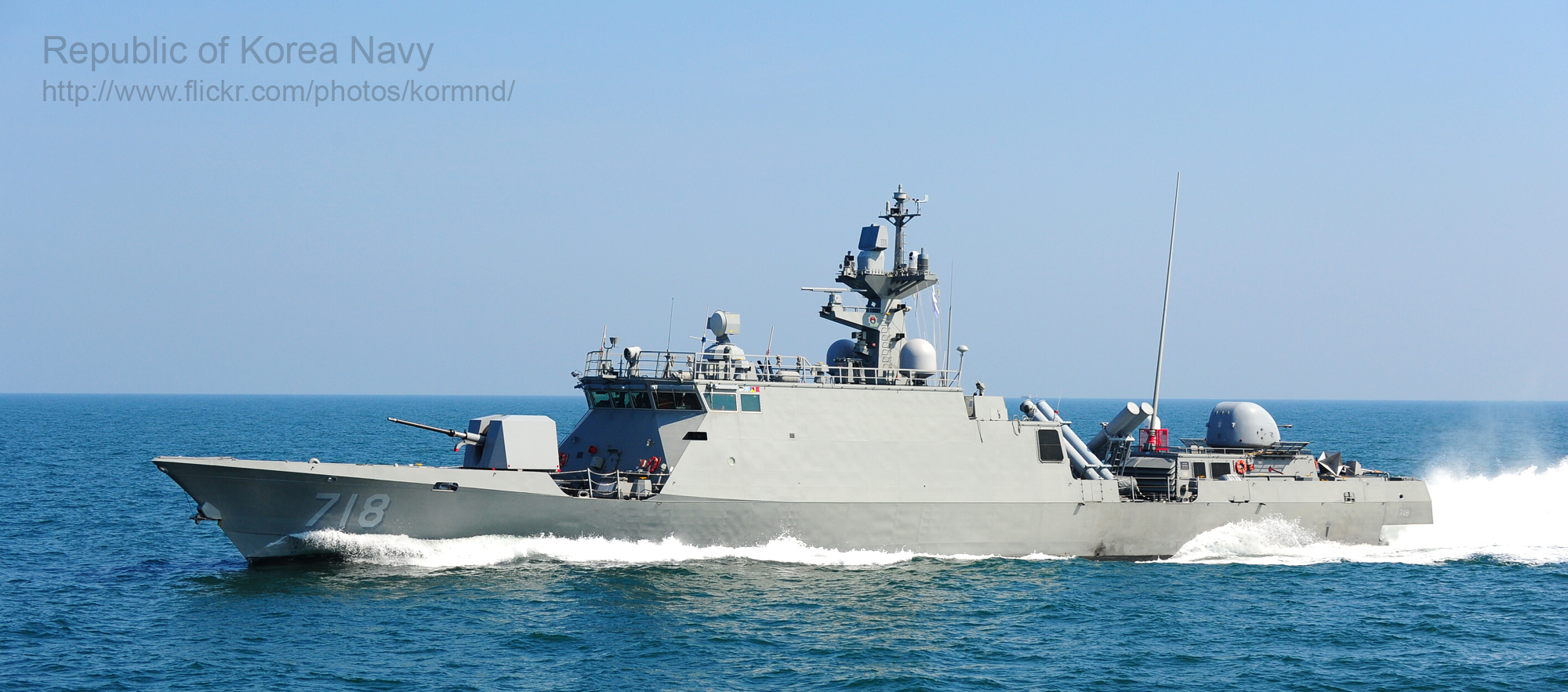
- ROKS Hyun Sihak

Class overview
- Name: Yoon Youngha class
- Builders: Hanjin Heavy Industries, STX
- Operators: Republic of Korea Navy
- Preceded by: Chamsuri class
- Subclasses: PKX-A(PKG) (Yoon Youngha class); PKX-B(PKMR)
- Cost: ₩48.8 billion; $37.7 million (constant 2009 USD)
- In commission: 2008–present
- Planned: PKX-A(PKG): 18, PKX-B(PKMR): 34
- Completed: PKX-A(PKG): 18, PKX-B(PKMR): 16
- Active: PKX-A(PKG): 18, PKX-B(PKMR): 16

General characteristics (PKX-A(PKG))
- Type: Patrol boat
- Displacement: 570 tonnes (561 long tons)
- Length: 63 m (206 ft 8 in)
- Beam: 9 m (29 ft 6 in)
- Draft: 3 m (9 ft 10 in)
- Propulsion: Combined diesel and gas (CODAG); 2 × Hanwha Techwin/GE LM500 gas turbine 4,570 kW (6,130 hp); 2 × Doosan/MTU 12V 595 TE903,240 kW (4,340 hp) (711); 2 × STX/MTU 16V 1163 TB93 5,920 kW (7,940 hp) (712~733); 3 × Doosan Heavy Industries waterjets
- Speed: 44 knots (81 km/h; 51 mph)
- Range: 1,998 nmi (3,700 km) at 15 kn (28 km/h; 17 mph)
- Complement: 40
- Sensors & processing systems: STX RadarSys SPS-100K surface search radar; LIG Nex1 SPS-540K 3D surveillance radar; Saab CEROS 200 Fire Control Radar and optronic sight; Hanwha systems electro-optical targeting system
- Electronic warfare & decoys: 2 × T.S Tech K-RBOC Mk36 chaff/flare dispenser; LIG Nex1 Sonata SLQ-200(V)K ECM/ECCM suite
- Armament: Hyundai Wia (after 3rd ship) 76 mm gun; S&T Dynamics 'Nobong' 40L/70K dual 40 mm gun; 4 × LIG Nex1 SSM-700K Haesung anti-ship cruise missile; 2 × S&T Dynamics K6 12.7 mm machine guns

General characteristics (PKX-B(PKMR))
- Type: Patrol boat
- Displacement: 200 tonnes (197 long tons)
- Length: 44 m (144 ft 4 in)
- Beam: 7 m (23 ft 0 in)
- Propulsion: CODAG
- Speed: 40 knots (74 km/h; 46 mph)
- Sensors & processing systems: STX RadarSys SPS-100K surface search radar; LIG Nex1 SPS-540K 3D surveillance radar; Saab CEROS 200 Fire Control Radar and optronic sight; Hanwha systems electro-optical targeting system
- Electronic warfare & decoys: LIG Nex1 Sonata SLQ-200(V)K ECM/ECCM suite
- Armament: Hyundai Wia 76 mm gun; 2 × S&T Dynamics K6 12.7 mm machine guns; 12 launcher 130 mm guided rocket

The Yoon Youngha-class patrol vessel (Hangul: 윤영하급 미사일고속함) also known as PKG-class patrol vessel is a class of patrol ship of the Republic of Korea Navy named after Yoon Young-ha. One variant is in active service and a smaller variant is planned. The first being the PKX-A or Yun Youngha-class missile patrol ship (Hangul: 윤영하급 고속함), and the second the PKX-B patrol boat (also known as Chamsuri-211-class patrol boat or Gumdoksuri-class patrol vessel).

== Development ==
The Republic of Korea Navy (ROKN) began development of the PKG class in 2003 after a Chamsuri-class (PKM-class) patrol boat was sunk during a naval clash with North Korean patrol boats on June 29, 2002. The codenamed PKX (Patrol Killer eXperimental) program is the patrol boat modernization project of the ROKN.

The PKX consist of two main designs. The larger, missile armed, PKX-A(PKG) of approximately 500 tons and the smaller, gun and rocket armed, PKX-B(PKMR) of approximately 200 tons. PKX-A(PKG) is planned to take up some of the operations done by Pohang-class corvettes, and the PKX-B(PKMR) is planned to replace the aging Chamsuri-class fleet.

The first PKX-A(PKG) vessels were ordered from Hanjin Heavy Industries. The lead ship of the class, Yoon Youngha, named after Lieutenant Commander Yoon Youngha who was killed during the second battle of Yeonpyeong, was launched on June 28, 2007 and commissioned on December 17, 2008. The production of the PKX-A(PKG) are being divided between Hanjin Heavy Industries and STX in lots of four.

The PKX-B variant includes a 130 mm guided rocket launcher at the stern. The first vessel was launched in July 2016 and was commissioned in late 2017; all four ships in the first batch will be delivered by the end of 2019. A contract was awarded to Hanjin Heavy Industries for ships 5 through 8 in June 2017, which are scheduled to be delivered after 2020. The contract for ships 9 through 12 were awarded in early 2018. The PKX-B was specifically designed to counter North Korean fast swarming crafts. The 12-canister 130 mm guided rocket launcher can hit targets between 3–20 km (1.9–12.4 mi; 1.6–10.8 nmi) using a rocket weighing 80 kg (180 lb) with an 8 kg (18 lb) warhead. Rockets have GPS/INS midcourse guidance with data uplink and terminal IIR homing, and three can be fired simultaneously.

== Ships in the class ==
Name	Pennant number	Builder	Launched	Commissioned	Decommissioned	Status
PKX-A(PKG)
Yoon Youngha (윤영하)	PKG-711	Hanjin Heavy Industries	28 June 2007	17 December 2008		Active
Han Sanggook (한상국)	PKG-712	STX Offshore & Shipbuilding	23 September 2009	14 September 2011		Active
Jo Chunhyung (조천형)	PKG-713	STX Offshore & Shipbuilding	23 September 2009	14 September 2011		Active
Hwang Dohyun (황도현)	PKG-715	STX Offshore & Shipbuilding	11 December 2009	13 January 2012		Active
Suh Hoowon (서후원)	PKG-716	STX Offshore & Shipbuilding	11 December 2009	28 November 2011		Active
Park Donghyuk (박동혁)	PKG-717	Hanjin Heavy Industries	28 July 2010	28 November 2011		Active
Hyun Sihak (현시학)	PKG-718	Hanjin Heavy Industries	28 July 2010			Active
Jung Geungmo (정긍모)	PKG-719	Hanjin Heavy Industries	2 November 2010	19 December 2011		Active
Ji Deokchil (지덕칠)	PKG-721	Hanjin Heavy Industries	2 November 2010	23 December 2011		Active
Lim Byeongrae (임병래)	PKG-722	STX Offshore & Shipbuilding	20 November 2012	3 September 2013		Active
Hong Siuk (홍시욱)	PKG-723	STX Offshore & Shipbuilding	20 November 2012	10 October 2013		Active
Hong Daeseon (홍대선)	PKG-725	STX Offshore & Shipbuilding	20 November 2012	4 November 2013		Active
Han Munsik (한문식)	PKG-726	Hanjin Heavy Industries	24 April 2013	28 January 2014		Active
Kim Changhak (김창학)	PKG-727	Hanjin Heavy Industries	24 April 2013	4 March 2014		Active
Park Dongjin (박동진)	PKG-728	Hanjin Heavy Industries	24 April 2013	1 April 2014		Active
Kim Soohyun (김수현)	PKG-729	STX Offshore & Shipbuilding	30 April 2014	30 September 2014		Active
Lee Byungchul (이병철)	PKG-733	STX Offshore & Shipbuilding	30 April 2014	28 November 2014		Active
Jeon Byeongik (전병익)	PKG-732	STX Offshore & Shipbuilding	24 June 2016	11 January 2018		Active
PKX-B(PKMR)
Chamsuri-211(참수리-211)	PKMR-211	Hanjin Heavy Industries	28 July 2016	30 October 2017		Active
Chamsuri-212(참수리-212)	PKMR-212	Hanjin Heavy Industries	21 December 2018	28 November 2019		Active
Chamsuri-213(참수리-213)	PKMR-213	Hanjin Heavy Industries	21 December 2018	18 December 2019		Active
Chamsuri-215(참수리-215)	PKMR-215	Hanjin Heavy Industries	21 December 2018	31 December 2019		Active
Chamsuri-216(참수리-216)	PKMR-216	Hanjin Heavy Industries	13 December 2019			Active
Chamsuri-217(참수리-217)	PKMR-217	Hanjin Heavy Industries	13 December 2019			Active
Chamsuri-218(참수리-218)	PKMR-218	Hanjin Heavy Industries	13 December 2019			Active
Chamsuri-219(참수리-219)	PKMR-219	Hanjin Heavy Industries	13 December 2019			Active
Chamsuri-221(참수리-221)	PKMR-221	Hanjin Heavy Industries	29 December 2020			Active
Chamsuri-222(참수리-222)	PKMR-222	Hanjin Heavy Industries	29 December 2020			Active
Chamsuri-223(참수리-223)	PKMR-223	Hanjin Heavy Industries	29 December 2020			Active
Chamsuri-225(참수리-225)	PKMR-225	Hanjin Heavy Industries	29 December 2020			Active
Chamsuri-226(참수리-226)	PKMR-226	Hanjin Heavy Industries	12 May 2022			Active
Chamsuri-227(참수리-227)	PKMR-227	Hanjin Heavy Industries	12 May 2022			Active
Chamsuri-228(참수리-228)	PKMR-228	Hanjin Heavy Industries	12 May 2022			Active
Chamsuri-229(참수리-229)	PKMR-229	Hanjin Heavy Industries	12 May 2022			Active

- The PKX-A first six ships were named after the sailors of patrol boat PKM 357, who were killed during the Second Battle of Yeonpyeong in 2002.
- South Korean navies do not use the number '0', '4' when assigning Pennant numbers to their ships. In Korea, there is a superstitious belief that '4' is an unlucky number (much like Friday the 13th). '0' is also considered as bad luck. There are two exceptions, though - MLS 560 Wonsan and submarines.
