= Deokjeokdo =

Island in Incheon, South Korea

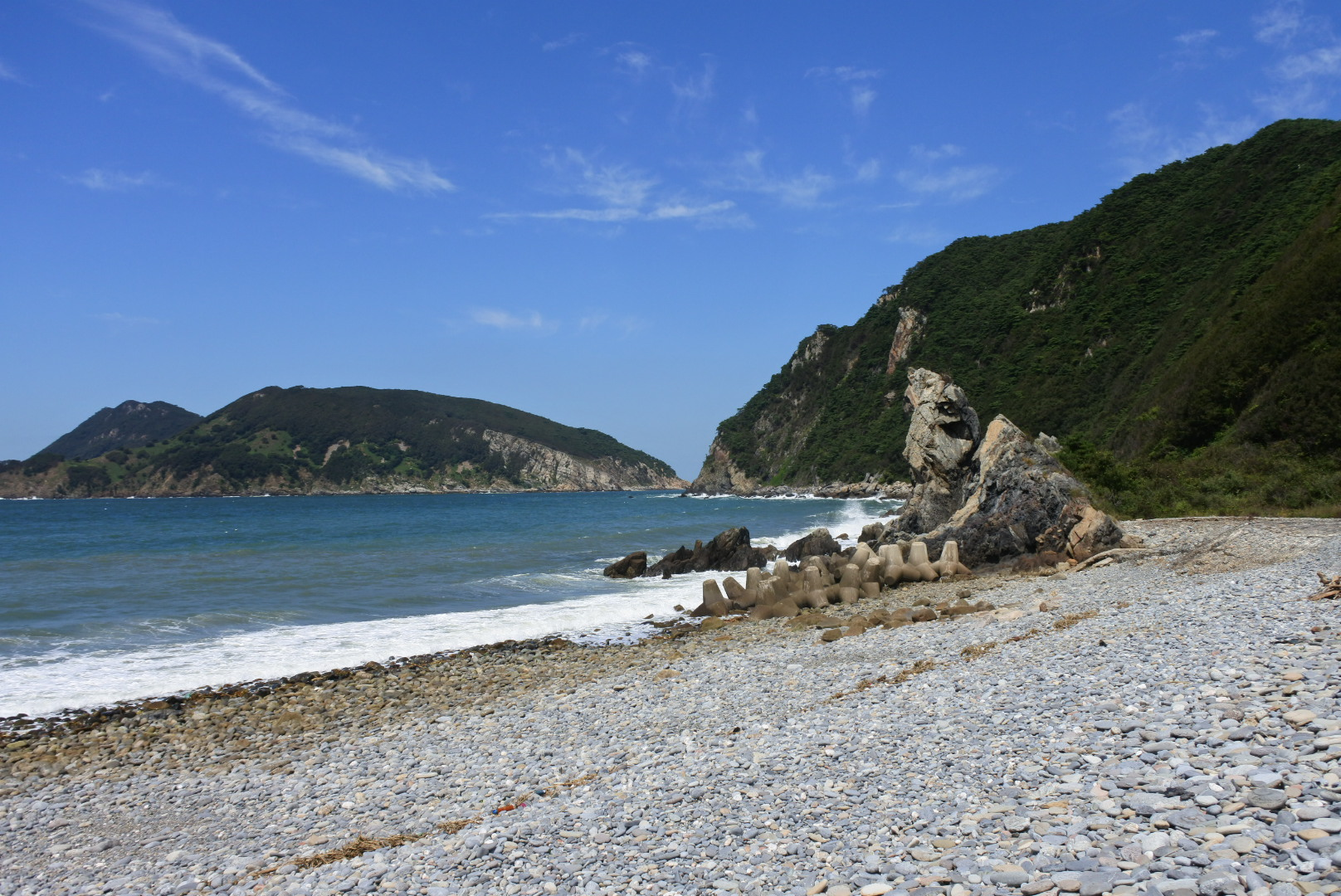
- Neungdong Jagalmadang, a beach on Deokjeokdo (2018)
- Interactive map of Deokjeokdo

Geography
- Coordinates: 37°14′34″N 126°07′52″E

Korean name
- Hangul: 덕적도
- Hanja: 德積島
- RR: Deokjeokdo
- MR: Tŏkchŏkto

Deokjeokdo (Korean: 덕적도) or Deokjeok Island is the largest island of Deokjeok-myeon, Ongjin County, Incheon, South Korea.

== Toponymy ==
The original name for the island was Keunmulseom (큰물섬; lit. island in the large sea). This name is reportedly sometimes used by local residents, via the nickname Keunmuri (큰물이). This name's meaning was potentially translated into Hanja as Deokmuldo (덕물도; 德勿島), and eventually to its final name.

== Description ==
Its highest point is the peak Guksubong (314 m). Its coastline is jagged and rocky.

In 2010, it had a population of 1,413, with 756 males and 657 females in 748 households. Most people live on the southeastern part of the island; this is where the local administrative office is as well. Many work in agriculture and fishing.

The island is situated 70 km (43 mi) northwest of Incheon's Yeon'an Pier. It can be reached from the ferry terminal in Incheon. It is an hour by hydrofoil from the mainland. A hiking trail leads to the top of one of two peaks on the island; the other peak is a military reservation. On the west side there is a beach with hotels, min-baks (rooms for rent in personal homes) yeong-wons (guesthouses, the lowest of the accommodation selections) and restaurants. The island is reforested almost entirely in pine trees. There are up to seven boats per day in the summer, but only one in other seasons. The boat leaves at different times in the morning, depending on the tides. There is a bus from the ferry dock to the other side of the island.

The island has a number of beaches for tourists, including the sandy beaches Seopori and Batjireum, and one pebble beach, Jagalmadang. Jinri Ferry operates transits to Seopo-ri and Buk-ri.
