= East Sea =

East Sea or Eastern Sea may refer to:

- East China Sea, a marginal sea east of China, where it is called Dōnghǎi (东海/東海) in Chinese, meaning "East Sea"
  - East Sea (Chinese literature), one of the Four Seas, a literary name for the boundaries of China
- South China Sea, a marginal sea south of China and east and south of Indochina, called Biển Đông in Vietnamese, meaning "East Sea"
- Sea of Japan, a marginal sea between the Korean Peninsula, Russia and the Japanese archipelago, called Donghae (Korean: 동해; Hanja: 東海; East Sea) in South Korea, and Chosŏn Tonghae (Korean: 조선동해; Hancha: 朝鮮東海; Korean East Sea) in North Korea.
  - Sea of Japan naming dispute
- Baltic Sea, called "East Sea" in various languages
- Dead Sea, a salt lake east of Israel, as used in the Bible (Joel 2:20; Ezek. 47:18)
- Mare Orientale, Latin for "Eastern Sea", on the Moon
- Atlantic Ocean, also referred to as the East Sea or Eastern Sea in poetry and other uses in North America
- Pacific Ocean, called the East Sea in poetry and other uses from Australia, New Zealand, China and Japan
- Indian Ocean, earlier called the "Eastern Ocean" or "Eastern Sea"
- Eastern Sea, the eastern ocean of Middle-earth in J. R. R. Tolkien's fiction

== See also ==
- East Sea Campaign, a naval operation of the Vietnam War
- East Sea Fleet
- Donghai Bridge
- South Sea (disambiguation)
- North Sea (disambiguation)
- West Sea (disambiguation)
- 東海, the Chinese script for "East Sea"
  - Donghae (disambiguation), Korean romanization
  - Tokai (disambiguation), Japanese romanization
  - Donghai (disambiguation), Pinyin romanization
  - Tunghai (disambiguation), Wade–Giles romanization
