= 南海 =

南海(남해), meaning "South Sea" in Chinese, Japanese, Korean and Vietnamese.

== See also ==
- South Sea (disambiguation)
- Nanhai (disambiguation), the Chinese pinyin transliteration
- Nankai (disambiguation), the Japanese transliteration
- Namhae (disambiguation), the Korean transliteration
