= Kattegat =

Sea between Denmark and Sweden

- Kattegatt (Swedish)
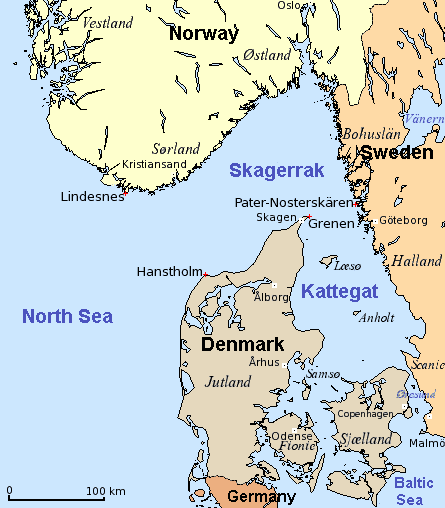
- Map of the Kattegat, the Skagerrak and the Danish Straits

- Location within Europe
- Coordinates: 56°52′N 11°23′E
- Etymology: lit. 'cat's gate'
- Basin countries: Denmark, Sweden
- Surface area: 24,000 km^{2} (9,300 sq mi)
- Average depth: 22 m (72 ft)
- Max. depth: 150 m (490 ft)
- Water volume: 532 km^{3} (128 cu mi)

The Kattegat (/ˈkætəɡæt/) is a sea of roughly 24,000 km^{2} (9,300 sq mi) bounded by the Skagerrak in the north, Jutland in the west, the Danish Straits and Zealand in the south and the Swedish provinces of Bohuslän, Västergötland, Halland and Scania in the east. The Baltic Sea drains into the Kattegat through the Danish Straits.

The Kattegat is rather shallow and can be dangerous to navigate due to many sandy, stony reefs and the tricky shifting currents. In modern times, artificial seabed channels have been dug, many reefs have been dredged either by sand pumping or boulder clearance, and a well-developed light signaling network has been installed to protect the heavy international traffic on the small sea.

There are several large cities and major ports on the Kattegat, including, in descending size, Gothenburg, Aarhus, Aalborg, Halmstad, Varberg and Frederikshavn.

== Etymology ==
According to Den Store Danske Encyklopædi and Nudansk Ordbog, the name is from the Dutch words katte 'cat's' and gat 'gate, passage'. It derives from late medieval navigation, in which captains of the Hanseatic trading fleets compared the Danish Straits to a passage so tight that even a cat would have difficulty squeezing its way through, owing to the many reefs and shoals. At one point, the passable waters were 3.84 km (2.07 nmi; 4,200 yd) wide. (The name of the Copenhagen street Kattesundet also means a narrow passage, lit. 'the cat's strait'.)

An archaic name for the Kattegat together with the Skagerrak was the Norwegian Sea or Jutland Sea (Knýtlinga saga mentions the name Jótlandshaf). Its ancient Latin name was Sinus Codanus.

== Boundaries ==
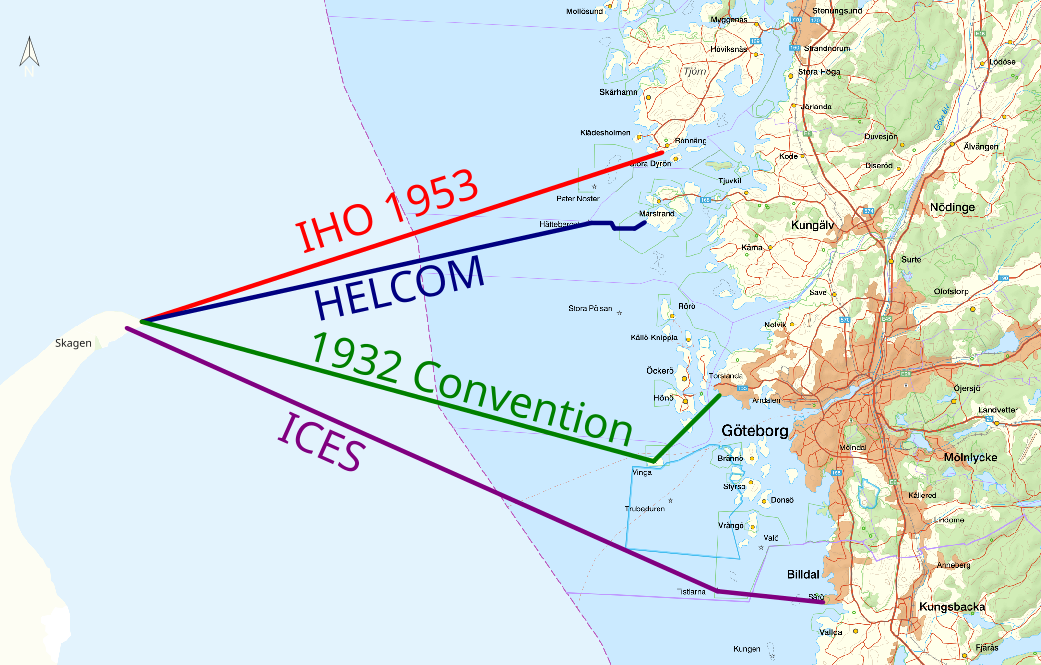
Different definitions of the boundary between the Kattegat and the Skagerrak.

On 31 December 1932 Denmark, Norway and Sweden signed a convention regulating the fishing of European plaice in the Skagerrak, the Kattegat and the Sound. There the Kattegat's boundary with the Skagerrak was defined a line from Skagen to Vinga Lighthouse and a line from there to the nearest point of Hisingen, while the boundary with the Danish Straits was defined by two lines, one from Hasenøre to Gniben and one from Gilbjerg hoved to Kullen Lighthouse. (Note: Hasenøre is the southeastern tip of Djursland, Gniben is the tip of Sjællands Odde and Gilbjerg hoved is the tip of Sjælland.) In the 3rd edition of the International Hydrographic Organization's (IHO) Limits of Oceans and Seas, published in 1953, the Kattegat is bundled together with the Danish Straits and this area's northern boundary was defined as a line from Skagen to the Pater Noster Skerries (around 30.5 km (19.0 mi) north of Vinga) and a line from there to Tjörn. (Note: No southern boundaries for the Kattegat were defined by the IHO due to the bundling with the Danish Straits.) HELCOM's definition has the northern boundary line running slightly further south than the IHO's does, stretching roughly from Skagen to the western tip of Klåverön (around 7.7 km (4.8 mi) south of Tjörn, and around 2.3 km (1.4 mi) south of Marstrand), but the boundary is not a straight line between these two points, as it becomes jagged near the Swedish coast. The International Council for the Exploration of the Sea's definition of the Kattegat aligns with the 1932 convention in defining the southern boundaries, but has the northern boundary going from Skagen Lighthouse to Tistlarna Lighthouse (around 15.5 km (9.6 mi) south of Vinga) and from there to the nearest point of the Swedish coast; this results in Gothenburg being on the Skagerrak instead of the Kattegat.

== Geography ==
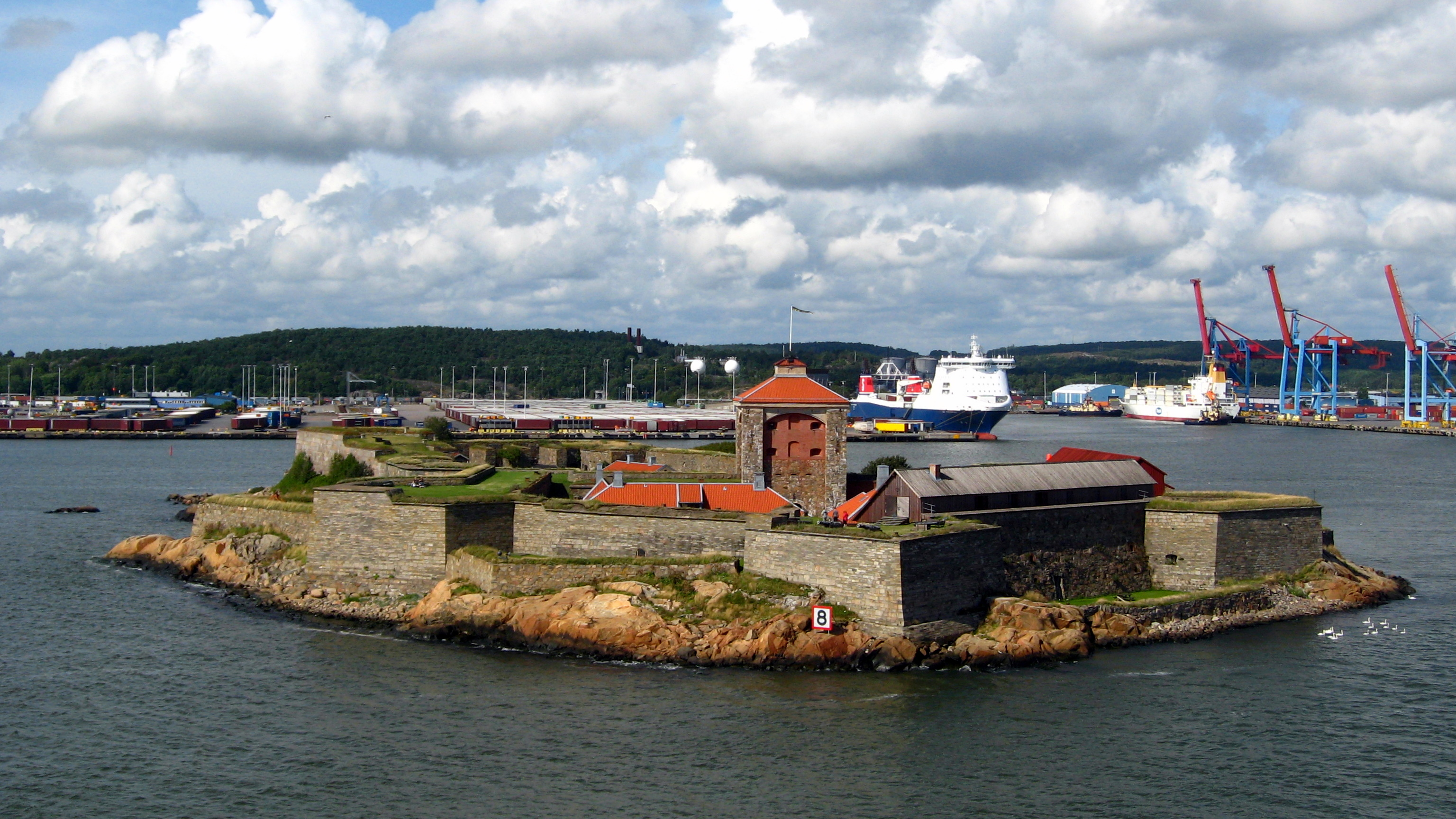
Älvsborg at Gothenburg, a sea fortress in the Kattegat

The main islands of the Kattegat are Samsø, Læsø and Anholt; due to their relatively dry climate, the last two are perceived to belong to "the Danish desert belt".

A number of noteworthy coastal areas abut the Kattegat, including the Kullaberg Nature Reserve in Scania, which contains a number of rare species and a scenic rocky shore, the town of Mölle, which has a picturesque harbour and views into the Kullaberg, and Skagen at the northern tip of Denmark.

Since the 1950s, a bridge proposal usually referred to as Kattegatbroen (the Kattegat Bridge) to connect Jutland and Zealand across the Kattegat has been considered. Since the late 2000s, there has been renewed interest in it from several influential politicians in Denmark. Such a bridge is usually envisioned as connecting Hov (a village south of Odder in the Aarhus area) with Samsø and Kalundborg.

=== Bathymetry ===
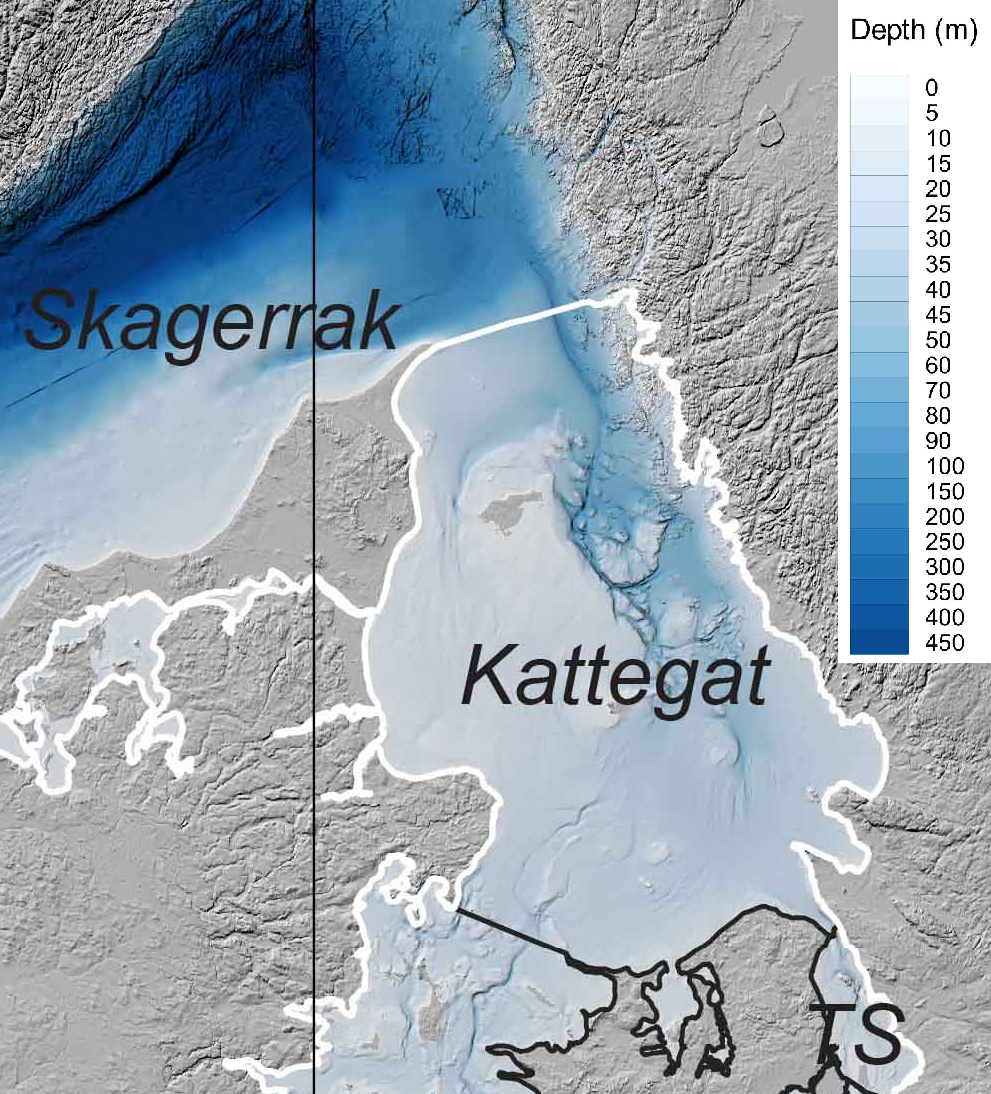
Bathymetric map of the Kattegat.

The majority of the Kattegat has a depth of less than 25 metres (82 ft), with the average being 22 m (72 ft), making the Kattegat deeper than the Danish Straits but shallower than the Baltic Sea and much shallower than the Skagerrak with its Norwegian Trench that reaches depths of over 700 m (2,300 ft). An extension of the Norwegian Trench, known as Djupa Rännan (lit. 'the Deep Groove'), stretches along the Swedish coast into the Kattegat, with waters being around 100 m (330 ft) deep near the boundary with the Skagerrak before becoming shallower as the trench stetches southwards, reaching around 75 m (246 ft) deep off the coast of Gothenburg, and eventually ending at a sill. Beyond this sill, to the northeast of the island of Læsø, lies the northern end of the Kattegat Trench, (Note: Also referred to as the Kattegat Channel.) which runs southwards at a depth of around 70–95 m (230–312 ft) for a further 45 kilometres (28 mi) through an area where waters are usually between 20 and 40 m (66 and 131 ft) deep. The northern end of the Kattegat Trench is also home to the Poseidon Deep and, a bit further to the south, the Alkor Deep, with maximum depths of over 150 m (490 ft) and 138 m (453 ft) respectively, the former being the deepest known point in the Kattegat. These are two of the many depressions with maximum depths of over 100 m (330 ft).

=== Hydrology ===
Major waterways that drain into the Kattegat are the rivers of Göta älv at Gothenburg, together with the Lagan, Nissan, Ätran and Viskan in the province of Halland on the Swedish side, and the Danish river of Gudenå in Jutland.

The Baltic Current transports an average of around 2.6 km^{3} (0.62 cu mi) of water through the Danish Straits and into the Kattegat every day, while the Baltic receives roughly half as much water in return every day, giving an average daily net water outflow from the Baltic to the Kattegat of around 1.3 km^{3} (0.31 cu mi) of water. Excluding the minor share that passes through the Little Belt, roughly 70% of the flow between the Baltic and the Kattegat passes through the Great Belt, with the Sound accounting for the remaining 30%. Once through the Danish Straits the Baltic Current flows north through the Kattegat as a surface current, and as it does so it is pushed up against the Swedish coast due to wind patterns and the Coriolis effect, where it continues flowing north until it enters the Skagerrak, where it eventually becomes the Norwegian Coastal Current. As the Baltic Current moves through the Kattegat the Baltic waters it carries spread out across the surface layer of the Kattegat, and this surface layer has another outflow into the Skagerrak in the form of the Jutland Coastal Current, which mainly exits the Kattegat through the shallow Læsø Channel between Læsø and Jutland. The deeper waters on the other side of Læsø are the main entry point for the water carried into the Kattegat by the deep current from the Skagerrak, which flows at a depth of 30–35 m (98–115 ft). The inflow of the deep current varies in volume significantly depending on the time of year, being around 2.42 km^{3} (0.58 cu mi) per day in summer and 5.53 km^{3} (1.33 cu mi) per day in winter.

The inflow of water brought by the currents from the Baltic Sea and the Skagerrak, with salinities of 0.8–1.2% and 3–3.5% respectively, result in the Kattegat being stratified into two layers, separated by the main halocline that sits at an average depth of 15 m (49 ft). The upper layer consists mostly of a mixture of Baltic and Skagerrak water and has a salinity of 1.5%–3%, being lower in the north and near the Swedish coast due to the Baltic Current. The lower layer consists mostly of North Atlantic, North Sea and Skagerrak water and has a salinity of 3–3.5%, with no regional variations comparable to that of the upper layer. The Kattegat has very low tidal activity, with the tides only changing the water level by around 15 to 30 cm, and it is instead wind that acts as the main driving force behind the mixing of the various water masses in the Kattegat.

== History ==
Controlling and having access to the Kattegat has been important throughout the history of international seafaring. Until the completion of the Eider Canal in 1784, the Kattegat was the only sea route into and out of the Baltic region.

Beginning in 1429 in the Middle Ages, the Danish royal family – and later the state of Denmark – profited greatly from the Sound dues, a toll charged for passage through the Øresund, while Copenhagen sheltered and repaired ships and provided trade opportunities and protection from piracy. The dues were lifted in 1857.

== Biology ==
The salinity in the Kattegat has a pronounced two-layer structure. The upper layer's salinity is between 18‰ and 26‰, while that of the lower layer (separated by a strong halocline at around 15 m (49 ft)) has a salinity between 32‰ and 34‰. The lower layer consists of inflowing seawater from the Skagerrak, with a salinity on par with most other coastal seawaters, while the upper layer, consisting of inflowing seawater from the Baltic Sea, has a much lower salinity, comparable to brackish water, but still a great deal higher than the rest of the Baltic. These two opposing flows transport a net surplus of 475 km^{3} (114 cu mi) of seawater from the Baltic to the Skagerrak every year. During strong winds, the Kattegat's layers are completely mixed in places such as the Great Belt, making the overall salinity highly variable. This leads to some distinctive conditions for sealife in the area.

Cold seeps, known locally as bubbling reefs (Danish: boblerev), can be found in the northern Kattegat. Unlike those in most other places (including the North Sea and Skagerrak), the Kattegat's cold seeps are at relatively shallow depths, generally from 0 to 30 m (0–100 ft) below the surface. The seeps rely on methane deposited during the Eemian period and during calm weather the bubbles can sometimes be seen on the surface of the water. Carbonate cementation and lithification form slaps or pillars up to 4 m (13 ft) tall and support a rich biodiversity. Due to their distinct properties, the Kattegat bubbling reefs are under protection and are recognised by the European Union (EU) as a Natura 2000 habitat (type 1180).

=== Ecological collapse ===
The Kattegat, characterised by widespread anoxia, was one of the first marine dead zones to be noted in the 1970s, when scientists began to study the effects of heavy industry on the natural world. Since then, research has lent much insight into processes like eutrophication, and how to deal with it. Since the first Action Plan for the Aquatic Environment in 1985, Denmark and the EU have begun costly, far-reaching domestic projects to stop, repair and prevent these environmentally destructive and economically damaging processes and are now busy implementing the fourth Action Plan. The action plans sum up a broad range of initiatives and include the so-called Nitrate Directives. The action plans have generally been viewed as a success, although the work is not finished and not all goals have been met yet.

== Protections and regulation ==
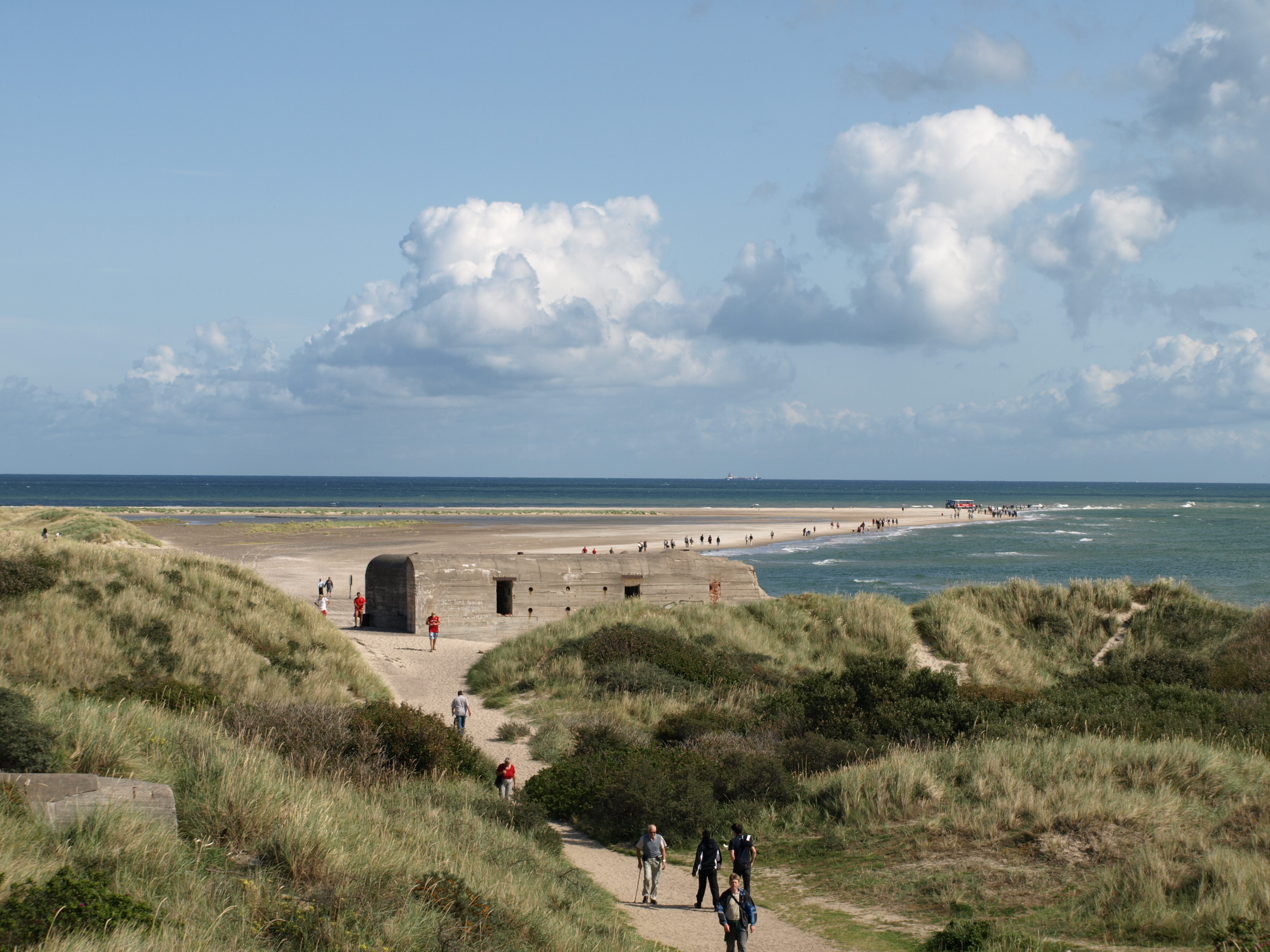
Grenen in Denmark is important for bird migrations and is a protected area.

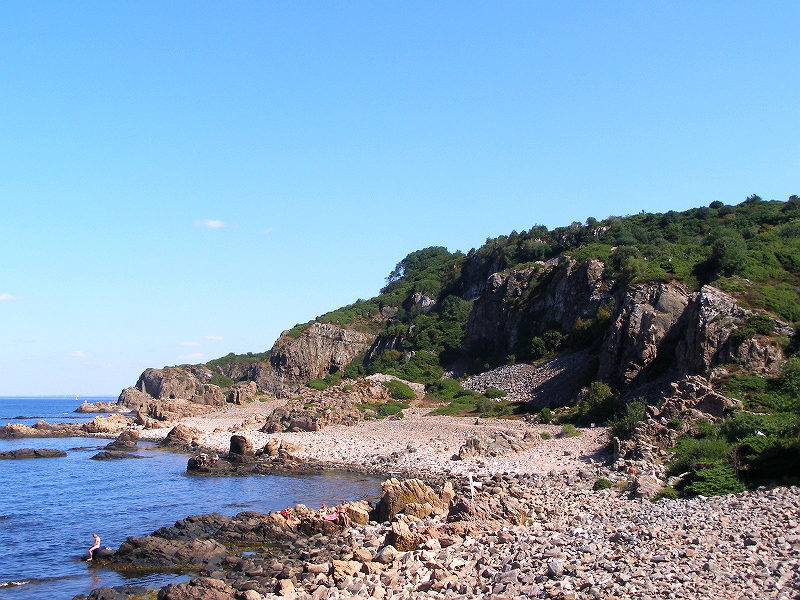
Bjärekusten Nature Reserve with Hovs Hallar in Sweden.

Due to its very heavy sea traffic and many large coastal settlements, the Kattegat has been designated as a Sulphur Emission Control Area as part of the Baltic Sea since 2006. As from 1 January 2016 the benchmark for sulphur in fuels was lowered to 0.1%.

Several large areas of the Kattegat are designated under Natura 2000 and various bird protections such as the Ramsar Convention. The remaining larger shallow reefs are among the protections, as they are important spawning and feeding grounds for fish and marine mammals and support a thriving but threatened biodiversity. Protected areas include:

Denmark

- Grenen
- The Bay of Aalborg, comprising a 1,774 km^{2} (685 sq mi) shallow sea area.
- Beach meadows on Læsø and the stony reefs south of the island.
- Anholt and the sea north of the island.

Sweden

- The Nordre älv estuary north of Gothenburg. An important spot for migratory birds and fish.
- The Vrångö archipelago (Swedish: Vrångöskärgården), part of the Archipelago of Gothenburg. An important reproduction area for seabirds and seals.
- Kungsbacka Fjord. A shallow water fjord between Gothenburg and Varberg, including important salt marshes.
- Hovs Hallar
- Kullaberg Nature Reserve

== Gallery ==
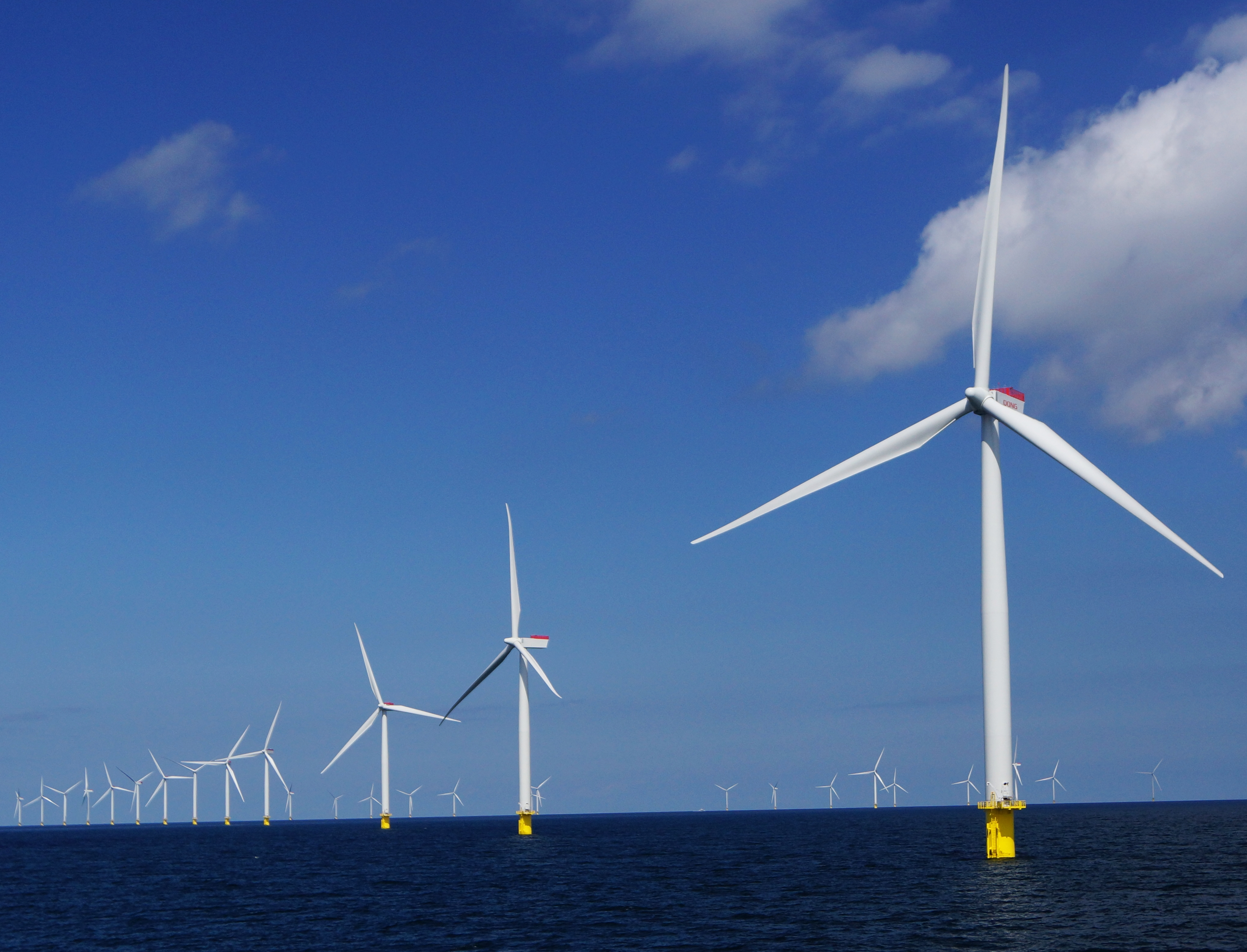
There are several offshore windfarms in the Kattegat.

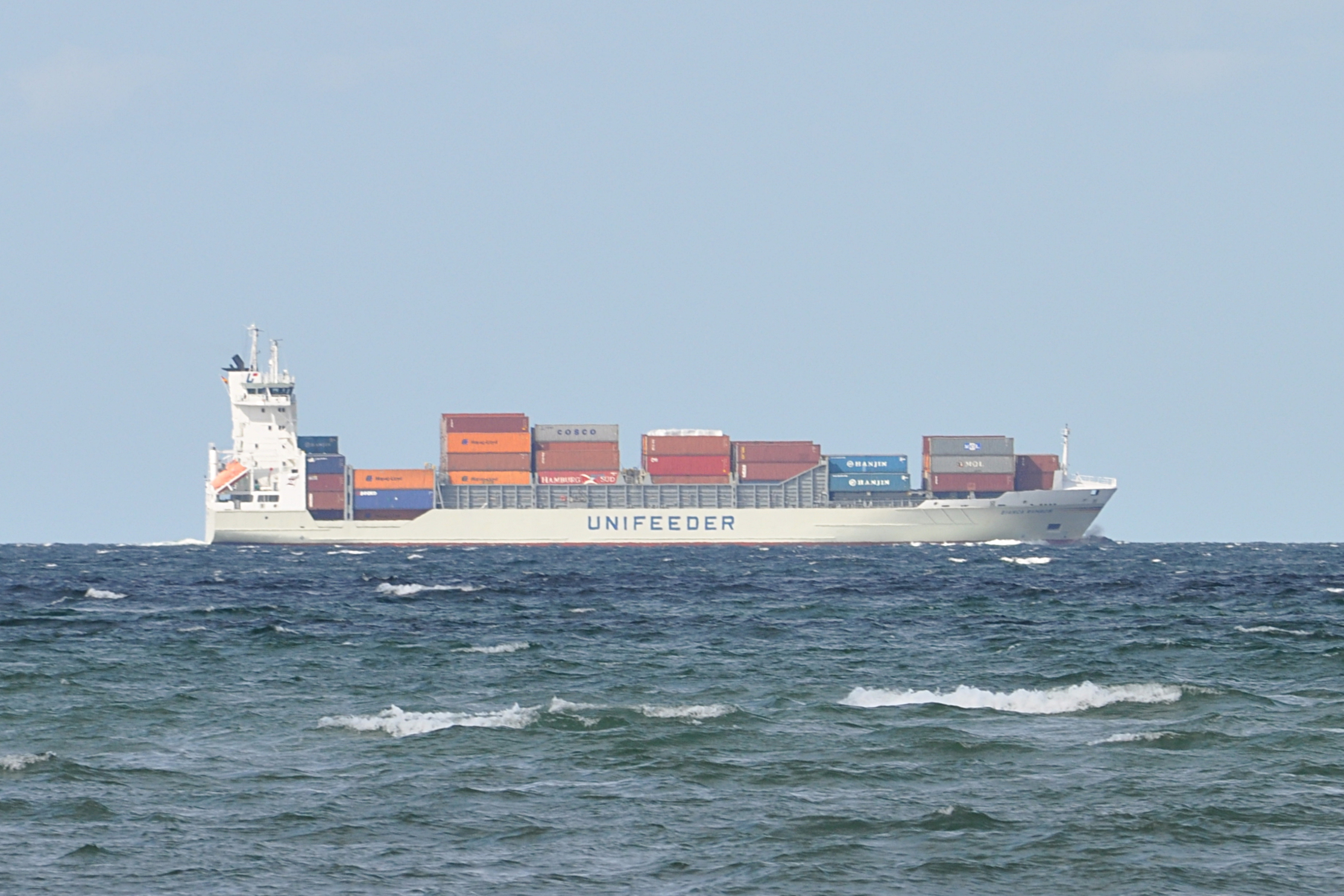
Some of the world's busiest shipping lanes pass through the Kattegat.

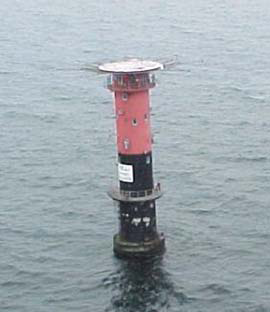
The larger shallow sand and stony reefs have been equipped with light signaling in modern times.

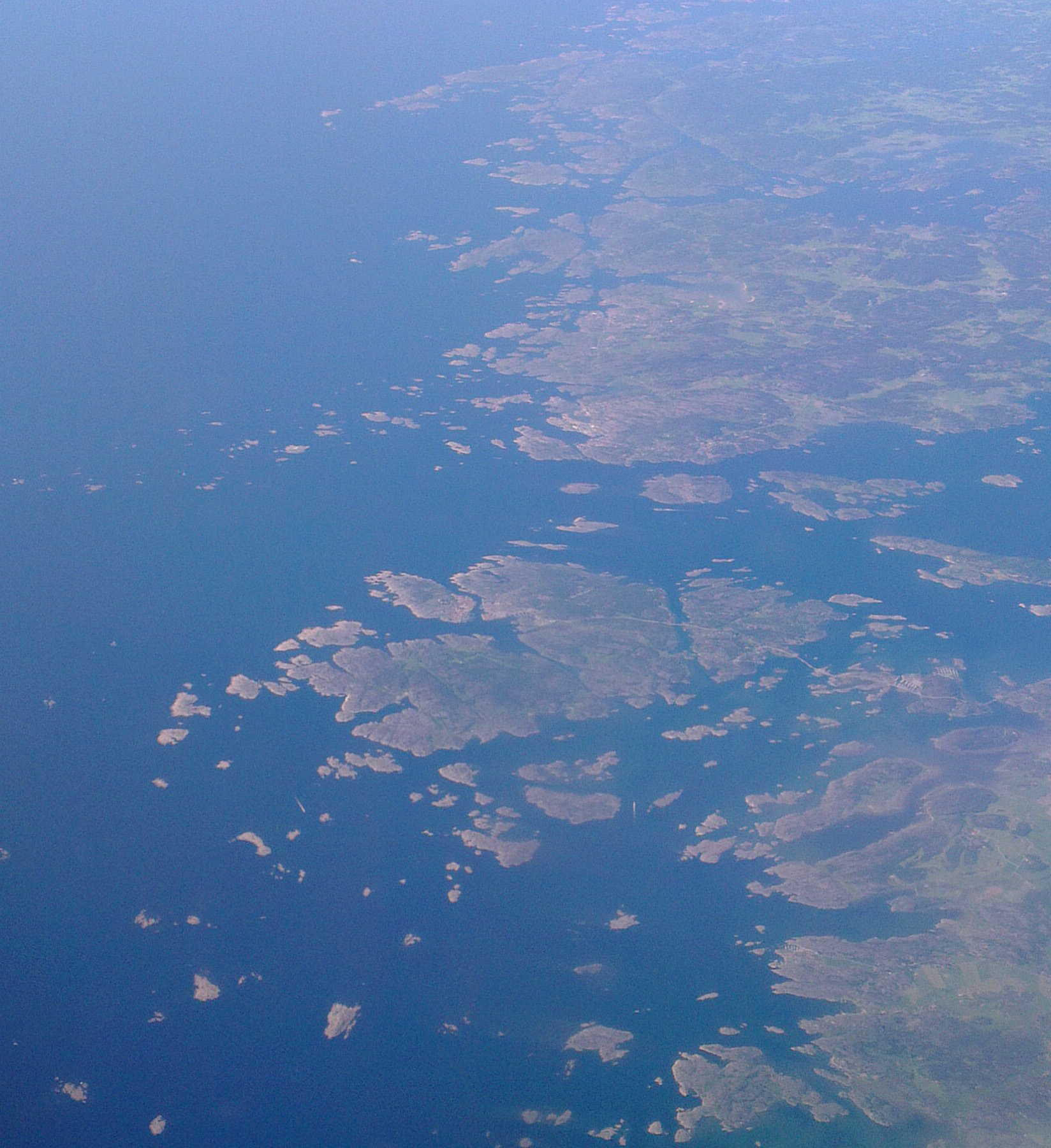
There are several small archipelagos near the mainland in the Swedish part of the Kattegat.

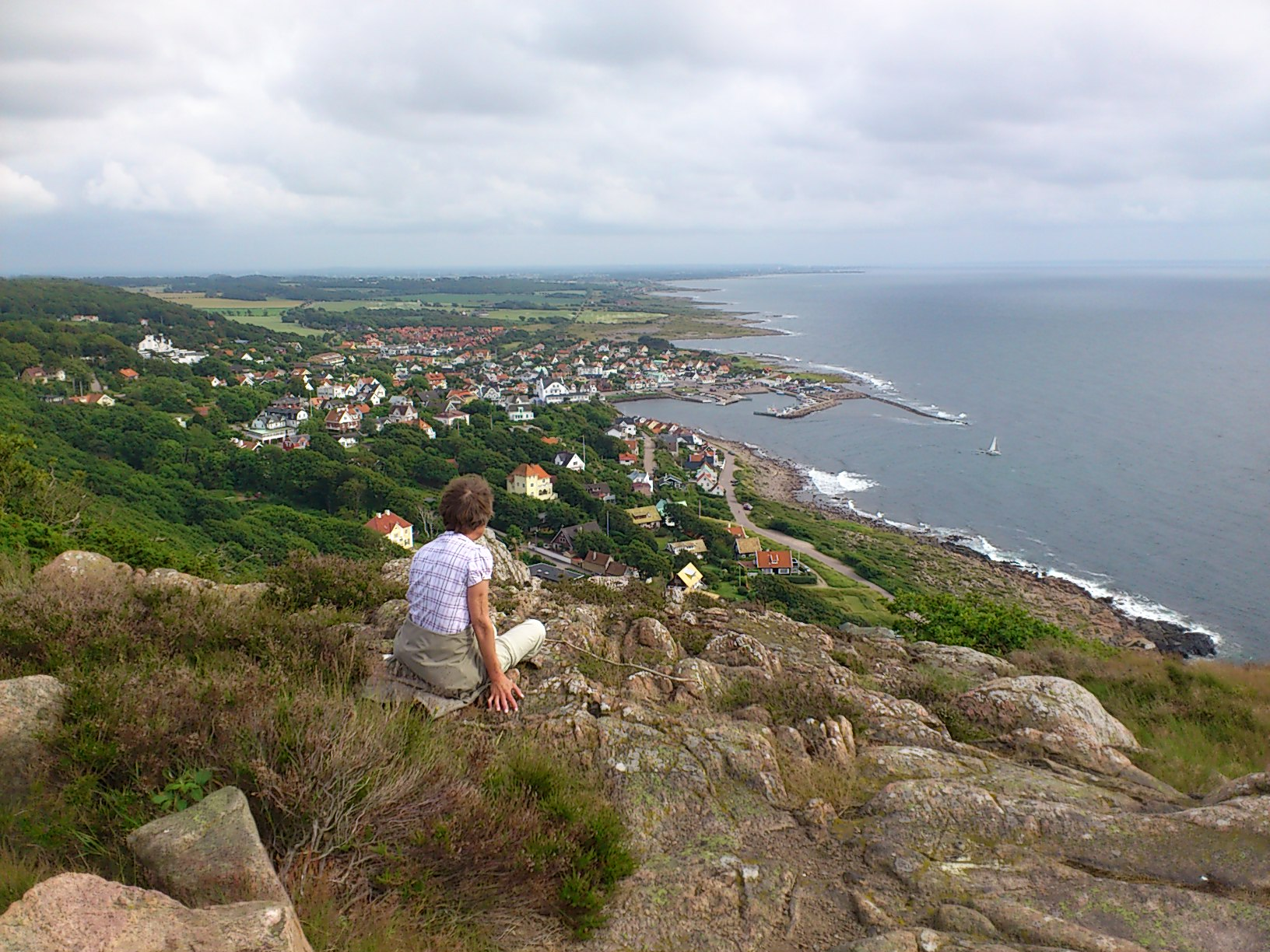
The Swedish coasts in the Kattegat are rocky shores, like this one in Kullaberg. (a few sandy or gravel beaches in-between)

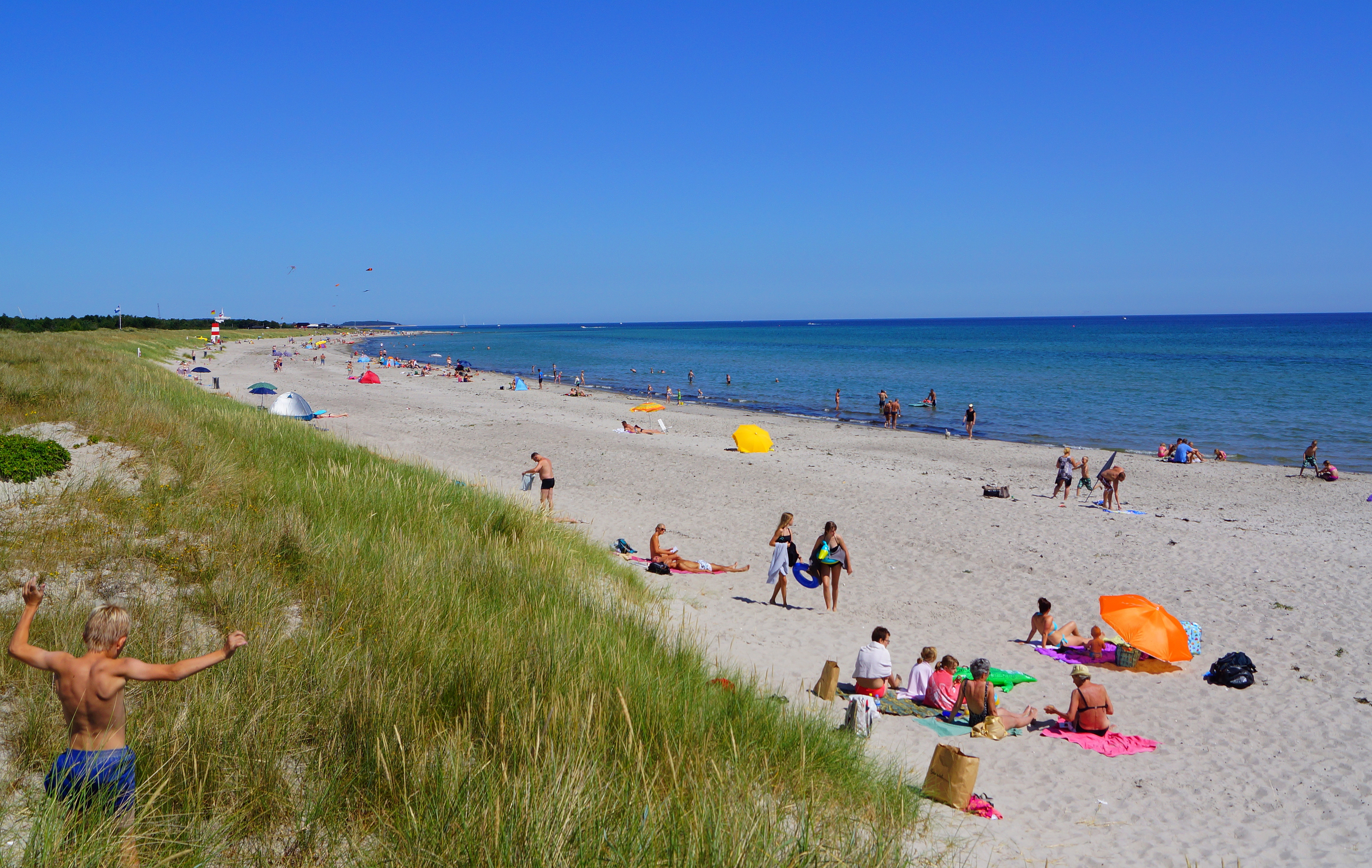
All the Danish coasts in the Kattegat are sandy or gravel beaches with no exposed bedrock.

== See also ==
- Øresund Bridge

== Works cited ==
- Longva, Oddvar; Olsen, Heidi A.; Piper, David J.W.; Rise, Leif; Thorsnes, Terje (2008). "Late glacial fans in the eastern Skagerrak; depositional environment interpreted from swath bathymetry and seismostratigraphy". Marine Geology. 251 (1–2): 110–123. doi:10.1016/j.margeo.2008.02.011.
- Bøe, Reidulv; Rise, Leif; Ottesen, Dag (1998). "Elongate depressions on the southern slope of the Norwegian Trench (Skagerrak): morphology and evolution". Marine Geology. 146 (1–4): 192–203. doi:10.1016/S0025-3227(97)00133-3.
- Nordberg, K.; Löfstedt Filipsson, H.; Malmgren, B. (1999). "Oceanographic Conditions in the Deepest Parts of the Kattegat, Scandinavia, Revealed Through Recent Benthic Foraminifera and Hydrography". Estuarine, Coastal and Shelf Science. 49 (4): 557–576. doi:10.1006/ecss.1999.0511.
- Matthews, J. B. L.; Buchholz, F.; Saborowski, R.; Tarling, G. A.; Dallot, S.; Labat, J. P. (30 August 1999). "On the physical oceanography of the Kattegat and Clyde Sea area, 1996–98, as background to ecophysiological studies on the planktonic crustacean, Meganyctiphanes norvegica (Euphausiacea)". Helgoland Marine Research. 53 (1): 70–84. doi:10.1007/PL00012140. ISSN 1438-387X.
- Dyrssen, David (1993). "The Baltic-Kattegat-Skagerrak Estuarine System". Estuaries. 16 (3): 446. doi:10.2307/1352592.
- Sayin, E.; Krauss, W. (1996). "A numerical study of the water exchange through the Danish Straits". Tellus A. 48 (2): 324–341. doi:10.1034/j.1600-0870.1996.t01-1-00009.x. ISSN 0280-6495.
- Allaart, Lis; Christensen, Nicklas; Pérez, Lara F.; Bennike, Ole; Singhroha, Sunny; Vangkilde-Pedersen, Thomas; Nørgaard-Pedersen, Niels; Overgaard Leth, Jørgen; Winther, Luna Holland; Prins, Lasse Tésik; Regnéll, Carl; Andresen, Katrine Juul (2026). "The drowned glacial landscape of Kattegat, Denmark". Quaternary Science Reviews. 381. doi:10.1016/j.quascirev.2026.109905.
- Jakobsen, Flemming (1997). "Hydrographic investigation of the Northern Kattegat front". Continental Shelf Research. 17 (5): 533–554. doi:10.1016/S0278-4343(96)00044-1.
- Andersson, Lars; Rydberg, Lars (1993). "Exchange of Water and Nutrients Between the Skagerrak and the Kattegat". Estuarine, Coastal and Shelf Science. 36 (2): 159–181. doi:10.1006/ecss.1993.1011.
