= North Sea (disambiguation) =

The North Sea is a marginal sea east of Great Britain, south of Norway, west of Denmark, and north of France.

North Sea or Northern Sea may also refer to:

- North Sea Region, European countries and regions that have access to the North Sea
- North Sea, New York, a hamlet in Suffolk County, Long Island
- Yellow Sea, in a Chinese military context. cf. East Sea (East China Sea) and South Sea (South China Sea) for unit names
  - North Sea Fleet of the Chinese Navy
- Sea of Okhotsk, in ancient Chinese sources, prior to Russian colonization and renaming of the same
- Lake Baikal, the North Sea of the Four Seas
- Northern Sea or North Aral Sea, the portion of the former Aral Sea that is fed by the Syr Darya River
- Beihai (disambiguation), translated into English as North Sea
- Arctic Ocean, the smallest, shallowest and northern-most of the world's five major oceans
- The portion of the North Atlantic Ocean north of Iceland
- Oceanus Borealis, see Mars ocean hypothesis
- Boreal Sea, was a Mesozoic-era seaway that lay along the northern border of Laurasia
- The Caribbean Sea, from the 16th century, Europeans visiting the region distinguished the "South Sea" (the Pacific Ocean south of the isthmus of Panama) from the "North Sea" (the Caribbean Sea north of the same isthmus)

== Arts and entertainment ==
- North Sea (1938 film), a 1938 documentary film
- The Burning Sea (Nordsjøen), a 2021 Norwegian disaster drama film released in some markets as North Sea
- The North Sea, a 1966 painting by LS Lowry

== See also ==
- South Sea (disambiguation)
- East Sea (disambiguation)
- West Sea (disambiguation)
- 北海
