= Kattegat Bridge =

Proposed bridge in Denmark

Danish Infrastructure Commission suggestion from 2007 for a fixed link across Kattegat (shown in green)

The Kattegat Bridge is a proposed bridge in Denmark across the southern portion of the Kattegat between the Jutland peninsula and the island of Zealand. If constructed, the bridge would connect Aarhus with Kalundborg in two segments (via Samsø) totaling about 35 kilometres (22 mi). First proposed as early as 2007, the bridge would serve as an additional east–west route across Denmark, supplementing the Great Belt Fixed Link. However, the Danish Ministry of Transport estimated in a 2014 study that relief capacity will not be required until about 2050, making the Kattegat Bridge unlikely to be constructed for many years. According to the 2014 analysis, construction costs would be around 132 billion kr.

== See also ==
- 2013 Waterfront Communications Lobbying Scandal
