= Maruman =

Maruman may refer to:

- A Japanese financial services company, now part of Tokai Tokyo Financial Holdings;
- a fictional cat, a character in the Obernewtyn Chronicles.
