= Western Sea =

Western Sea may refer to:

- Admiral of the Western Seas, Zheng He, of the Ming Dynasty of China
- Qinghai lake, amongst the Chinese "four seas"
- USS Western Sea, a U.S. Navy ship name
  - USS Western Sea (ID-3153), a United States Navy cargo ship in commission from 1918 to 1919
- SS Western Sea, a steam cargo ship built in 1918 and scrapped in 1931
- 2010 Western Sea conflict, in Korea's Western Sea, the Yellow Sea

== See also ==
- Western Sea Frontier
- Western Seaboard (disambiguation)
- West Sea (disambiguation), an alternative name for several bodies of water
- Battle of Yeonpyeong (disambiguation), aka, Battle of the Western Sea
- Western (disambiguation)
- Sea (disambiguation)
- Western sea-purslane (Sesuvium verrucosum) a species of flowering plant
