= Donghai =

Donghai (East Sea) may refer to:

== China ==
- East China Sea, also known as Donghai from its Chinese name (东海), a marginal sea east of China
  - East Sea (Chinese literature), one of the Four Seas, a literary name for the boundaries of China
- Donghai County (东海县), of Lianyungang, Jiangsu
- Donghai Island (东海岛), island in Zhanjiang, Guangdong
- Donghai Subdistrict (东海街道)
  - Donghai Subdistrict, Quanzhou, in Fengze District, Quanzhou, Fujian
  - Donghai Subdistrict, Lufeng, Shanwei, Guangdong
  - Donghai Subdistrict, Jixi, in Chengzihe District, Jixi, Heilongjiang
  - Donghai Subdistrict, Tianjin, in Hexi District, Tianjin
- Towns named Donghai (东海镇)
  - Donghai, Putian County, Fujian
  - Donghai, Jidong County, Heilongjiang
  - Donghai, Qidong, Jiangsu
- Donghai Commandery, historical commandery in present-day Shandong and Jiangsu

== Vietnam ==
- Đông Hải District, in Bac Lieu Province, Vietnam

== Astronomy ==
- The Chinese name of the star Eta Serpentis

== See also ==
- East Sea (disambiguation)
- Nanhai (disambiguation) ("South Sea")
- Beihai (disambiguation) ("North Sea")
- Xihai (disambiguation) ("West Sea")
- 東海 (disambiguation), the East Asian script for "East Sea"
  - Donghae (disambiguation), Korean romanization
  - Tōkai (disambiguation), Japanese romanization
  - Tunghai (disambiguation), Wade–Giles romanization
