= South Sea =

South Sea, South Seas or Southsea may refer to:

== Bodies of water ==
- Pacific Ocean, originally named by European explorers Mar del Sur, or South Sea
  - South Seas, a common name for the South Pacific
- The Southern Sea, an alternate name for the Gulf of Mexico, particularly during the Mexican-American War
- Southern Ocean or the Great Southern Ocean, the Antarctic Ocean and the South Polar Ocean
- South China Sea, encompassing an area from Singapore to the Strait of Taiwan
- Namhae (sea) or South Sea, Korean name for body of water south of the Korean Peninsula, where the Yellow Sea meets Sea of Japan
- Zuiderzee or Southern Sea, a reclaimed bay of the North Sea, now IJsselmeer, Netherlands
- Red Sea, also known as Southern Sea in the ancient Mediterranean world
- English Channel, called the South Sea by the early Anglo-Saxons

== Geographic regions and populated places ==
- Oceania, Australia and the islands east of Australia
- Nanyang (region), Chinese name for the geographical region south of China, particularly Southeast Asia
- Polynesia, also called the South Sea Islands
- South Seas Mandate, territories assigned to Japan by the League of Nations after World War I
- Southsea, a seaside resort in Portsmouth, England, UK
- Southsea, Wrexham, village in Wrexham, Wales, UK

== Arts ==
- South Seas (genre), a genre of literature and films taking place in Oceania or Pacific Islands
- The South Seas (novel), a 1979 Spanish novel by Manuel Vázquez Montalbán

== Other ==
- South Sea Roller Derby, an Australian roller derby league
- PS Southsea (1930), passenger vessel built for the Southern Railway in 1930
- TSMV Southsea, a passenger ferry built in 1948
- Mare Australe or Southern Sea, lunar mare in the southeastern hemisphere of the Moon

== See also ==
- North Sea (disambiguation)
- East Sea (disambiguation)
- West Sea (disambiguation)
- 南海 (disambiguation)：
  - Nanhai (disambiguation), meaning South Sea in Chinese
  - Nankai (disambiguation), meaning South Sea in Japanese
  - Namhae (disambiguation), meaning South Sea in Korean
- Southern Seas (disambiguation)
- Mar del Sur (disambiguation)
