= Sea of Japan naming dispute =

Dispute between Japan and Korea

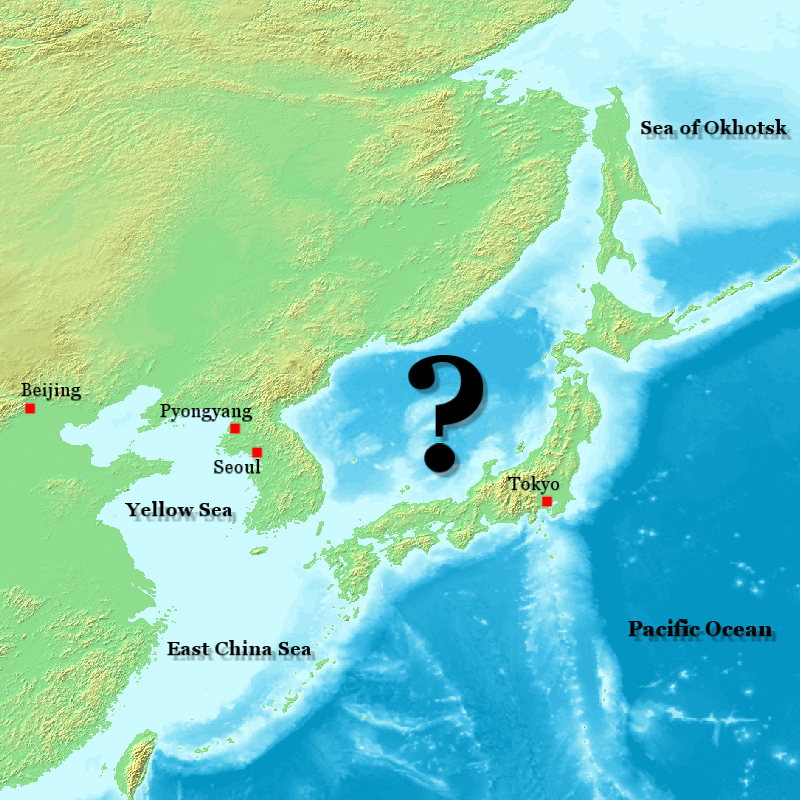
The dispute concerns the international name of the body of water marked with a "?" above. Japan's preference: Sea of Japan North Korea's preference: Korean East Sea South Korea's preference: East Sea

A dispute exists over the international name for the body of water which is bordered by Japan, Korea (North and South) and Russia. In 1992, objections to the name Sea of Japan were first raised by North Korea and South Korea at the Sixth United Nations Conference on the Standardization of Geographical Names. The Japanese government supports the exclusive use of the name "Sea of Japan" (Japanese: 日本海, Hepburn: Nihon-kai), while South Korea supports the alternative name "East Sea" (Korean: 동해; Hanja: 東海), and North Korea supports the name "Korean East Sea" (조선동해; 朝鮮東海). Currently, most international maps and documents use either the name Sea of Japan (or equivalent translation) by itself, or include both the name Sea of Japan and East Sea, often with East Sea listed in parentheses or otherwise marked as a secondary name. The International Hydrographic Organization (IHO) adopted the name “Japan Sea” in 1929 publication “Limits of Oceans and Seas (S-23)”, and maintained it in subsequent editions in 1939 and 1953. The primary reasons for this adoption was that Japan was an emerging global power with significant international influence, while Korea was under Japanese colonial rule (1910–1945) and Korean War (1950–1953). South Korea has challenged this since gaining independence, arguing they had no opportunity to participate in the naming process. Their diplomatic efforts have led the IHO to acknowledge the dispute. The attempt to publish a new edition of "Limits of Oceans and Seas" has been delayed for decades because of the inability to resolve this naming dispute.

In 2020, the IHO has moved toward a new standard (S-130), which uses numerical identifiers for sea areas instead of sea area names in S-23.

The involved countries (especially Japan and South Korea) have advanced a variety of arguments to support their preferred name(s). Many of the arguments revolve around determining when the name Sea of Japan became the common name. South Korea argues that historically the more common name was East Sea, Sea of Korea, or another similar variant. South Korea further argues that the name Sea of Japan did not become common until Korea was under Japanese rule, at which time it had no ability to influence international affairs. Japan argues that the name Sea of Japan has been the most common international name since at least the beginning of the 19th century, long before its annexation of Korea, and it was in use during its period of isolation when Japan had little to no contact with foreign nations. Both sides have conducted studies of antiquarian maps, but the two countries have produced divergent research results. Additional arguments have been raised regarding the underlying geography of the sea as well as potential problems regarding the ambiguity of one name or the other.

== Arguments ==
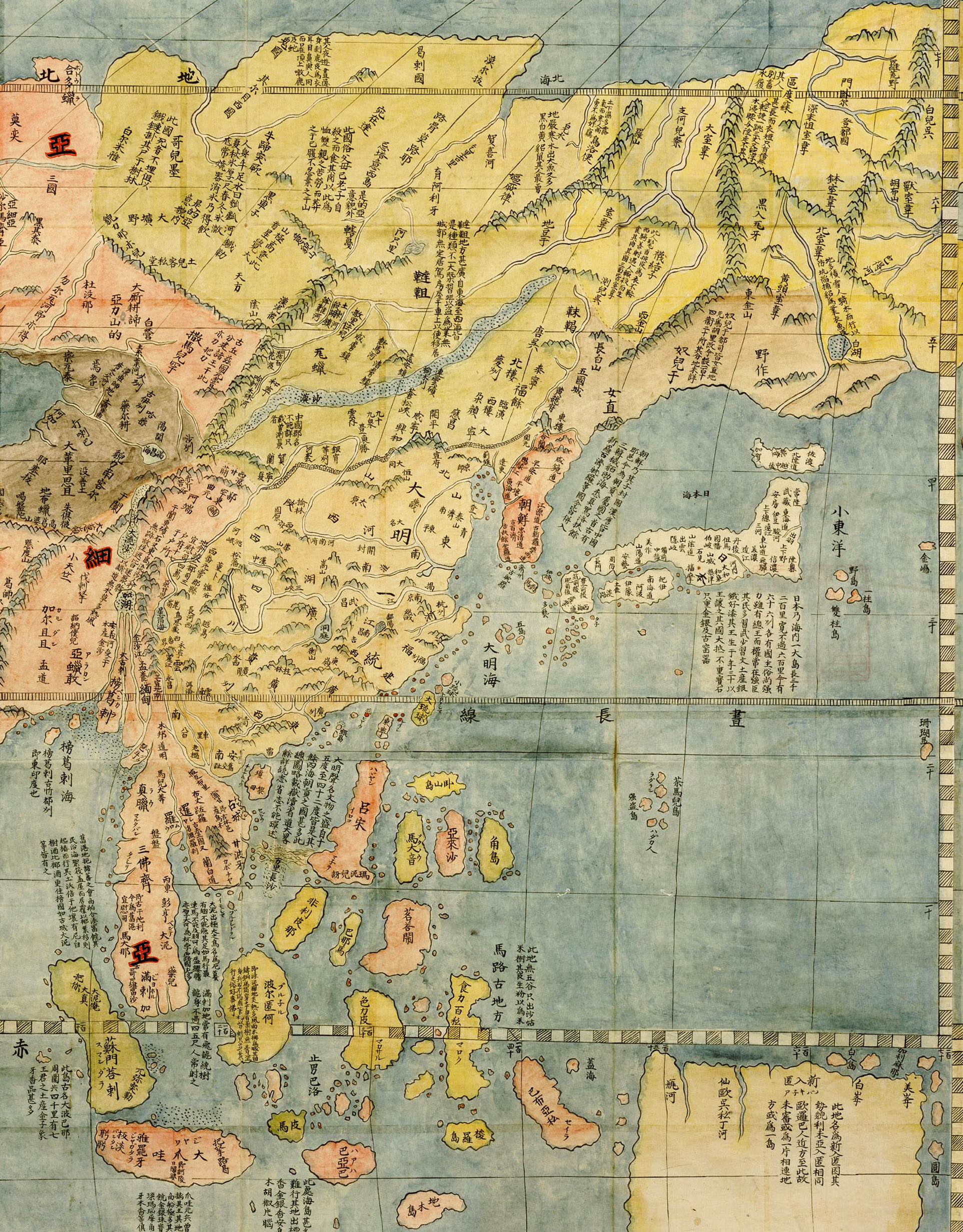
The Far East as depicted within the Kunyu Wanguo Quantu by Matteo Ricci in 1602 describing the sea as the Sea of Japan

Both sides in the dispute have put forward a number of arguments to support their claims.

=== Arguments based on historical maps ===
==== Arguments from South Korea ====
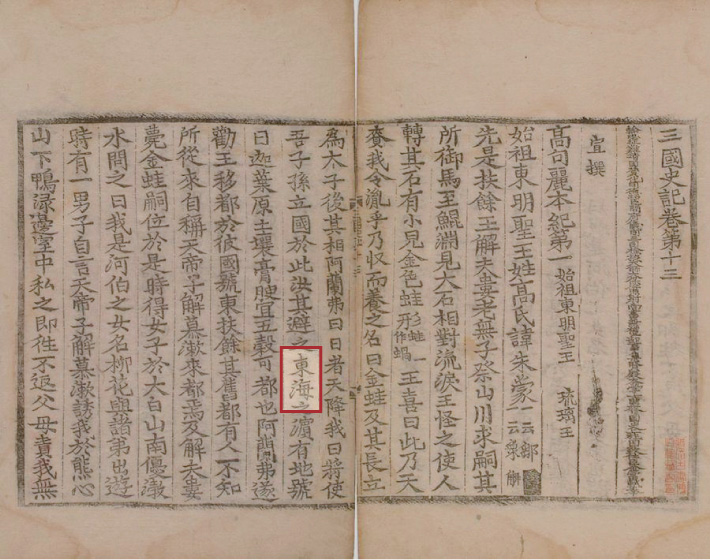
Samguk sagi (history of the three Kingdoms, 1145), which recounts the ancient history of Korea from 57 BC to 935 AD, shows the name "East Sea" was used from around 50 BC.

According to South Korea's Ministry of Foreign Affairs, the name East Sea (Donghae(동해)) can be found in various historical records produced in the span of over 2,000 years, including the History of the Three Kingdoms (1145), the monument of King Gwanggaeto (414), and "Map of Eight Provinces of Korea" (八道總圖, 1530). According to such records, the name East Sea is almost 1,700 years older than the first documented world map to name the area the Sea of Japan, the Kunyu Wanguo Quantu (坤輿萬國全圖), which was drawn by the Italian missionary Matteo Ricci in China (1602). No Japanese record published up to the late-18th century indicated any name for the body of water. Furthermore, South Korea has pointed out that Japan itself recognized the sea as Sea of Joseon (Korea) not Sea of Japan since some 18th and 19th-century Japanese maps referred to the sea as Chōsenkai (朝鮮海, literally Sea of Joseon), including the Simplified Map of Japan's Periphery (日本邊界略圖; 1809), Map of Asia (亞細亞全圖, 1794) which was drawn by Katsuragawa Hoshu (桂川甫周) and the New World Map (新製輿地全圖; 1844). Additionally, it specifically states that the name Sea of Japan was not widely used, even in Japan, as late as the mid 19th century. Moreover, South Korea argues that it was unable to present its case for the name 'East Sea' internationally because it was under Japan's colonial rule and in the midst of the Korean War. South Korea began advocating for the use of "East Sea" internationally in 1992, when it participated in the UN Conference on the Standardization of Geographical Names.

==== Arguments from Japan ====
The Japanese government claims that the name Sea of Japan had been internationally used since the 17th century and established by the early 19th century, during which Japan was under an isolationist policy (Sakoku) of the Tokugawa shogunate that restricted cultural exchange and commerce with foreign countries except China and the Netherlands until 1854. Accordingly, they state, Japan could not have, at that time, had an influence on the international community regarding the naming of the sea.

The invention of the marine chronometer in the late 18th century enabled Western explorers, such as Jean-François de Galaup from France, William Robert Broughton from Britain, and Adam Johann von Krusenstern (Ivan Fyodorovich Kruzenshtern) from Russia, to measure time and longitudes on the sea precisely and map the detailed shape of the Sea of Japan. Krusenstern was an admiral and explorer, who led the first Russian circumnavigation of the globe. According to Japanese records, it was Krusenstern who popularized the name "Mer du Japon" (Sea of Japan) in the West. In his work "Reise um die Welt in den Jahren" (1812), he wrote, "People also call this sea area the Sea of Korea, but because only a small part of this sea touches the Korean coast, it is better to name it the Sea of Japan." The original book was published in St. Petersburg in German and Russian, translated into Dutch, French, Swedish, Italian, and English, and distributed widely among Europe. As a result, the international name of the sea changed from no name to the Sea of Japan, on the maps drawn by countries other than Japan or Korea during the 17th to 20th centuries. Thus, the Japanese side argues that the South Koreans misunderstand the history of the name.

==== Surveys of antiquarian maps ====
Comparison of the antiquarian-map surveys respectively reported by the government of Japan and the government of South Korea
Century	16th century					17th century					18th century						19th century							Unknown	Total						
Surveyed by	Japan				Korea	Japan				Korea	Japan					Korea	Japan						Korea	Japan	Japan						Korea
Surveyed in	US	FR	DE	Total	Total	US	FR	DE	Total	Total	US	FR	DE	RU	Total	Total	US	FR	DE	RU	UK	Total	Total	FR	US	FR	DE	RU	UK	Total	Total
Sea of Japan	1	0	1	2	-	3	14	5	22	17	47	24	23	2	96	36	1059	206	487	27	50	1829	69	10	1110	254	516	29	50	1959	122
East Sea	0	0	3	3	-	0	0	0	0	39	5	0	7	1	13	341	1	0	3	0	0	4	60	0	6	0	13	1	0	20	440
Sea of Korea	0	2	0	2	-	2	4	2	8	39	94	49	159	5	307	341	92	6	37	4	8	147	60	7	188	68	198	9	8	471	440
Oriental Sea	0	0	3	3	-	4	20	14	38	39	14	4	57	–	75	341	2	0	3	–	–	5	60	8	20	32	77	–	–	129	440
Sea of China	3	5	12	25	16	11	36	18	86	28	8	6	8	1	56	10	0	5	1	0	–	32	-	4	22	56	39	1	–	203	54
Others	0	5	5	25	13	3	36	18	86	41	17	6	16	–	56	80	22	5	4	–	–	32	12	4	42	56	43	–	–	203	146
No entry and not determined	32	–	44	76	13	83	–	83	166	41	116	–	152	4	272	80	109	–	120	5	–	234	12	–	340	–	399	9	–	748	146
Total	36	7	68	111	29	106	74	140	320	125	301	83	422	13	819	467	1285	217	655	36	58	2251	141	29	1728	410	1285	49	58	3530	762

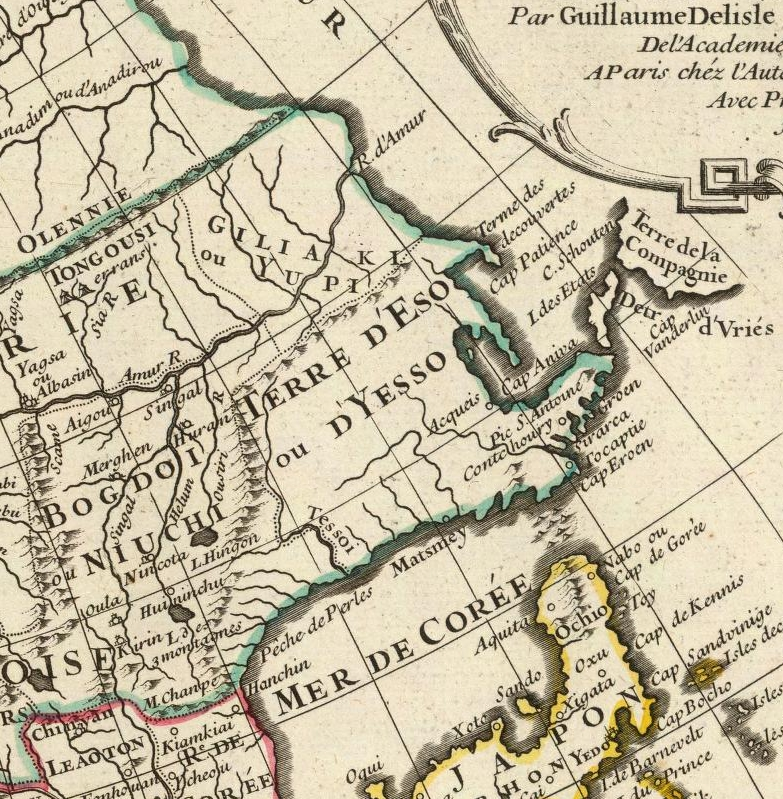
A 1723 French map describing the sea as Mer de Corée (Sea of Korea)

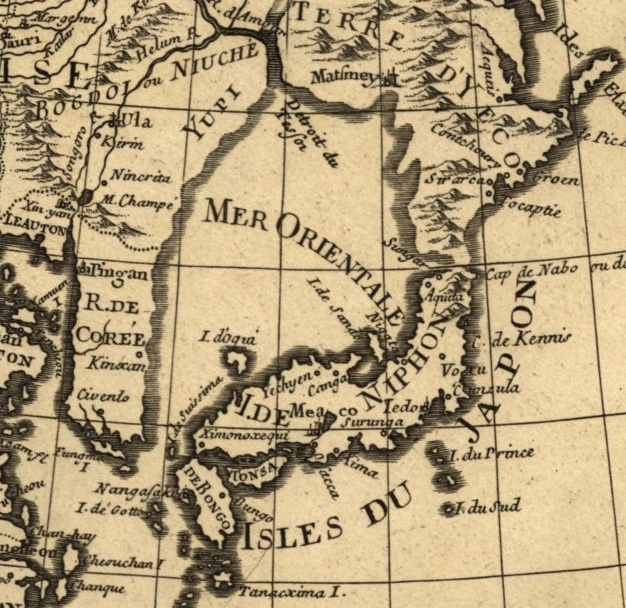
A 1700 French map describing the sea as Mer Orientale (Eastern Sea or Oriental Sea)

To provide evidence for the date when Sea of Japan came to be used internationally, both South Korea and Japan have undertaken surveys of various historical maps.

In 2004, South Korea surveyed ancient maps archived in the British Library, the Cambridge University Library, the University of Southern California (USC) East Asian Map Collection, the U.S. Library of Congress, the National Library of Russia, and the French National Library. South Korean researchers examined 762 maps. They found that 440 maps had used Sea of Korea (Corea), Oriental Sea/East Sea, 122 had used Sea of Japan, and 200 had used other terms. In the French language, the word orientale includes both the meaning of "eastern" related to compass direction and the meaning of "oriental", the Asiatic region. The same ambiguity is present in the Russian language, with both "eastern" and "oriental" indicated by one word.

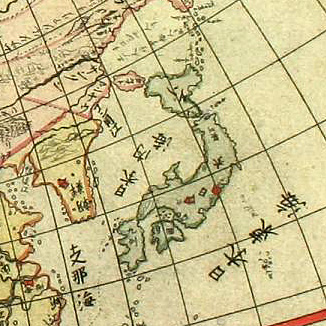
A 1792 Japanese map "Chikyu Zenzu" drawn by Shiba Kōkan. The sea is described as "Inland Sea of Japan" (日本内海) and the Pacific Ocean is described as "East Sea of Japan" (日本東海).

From 2003 to 2008, Japan conducted a number of surveys of different collections. In 2010, the Ministry of Foreign Affairs of Japan published their conclusions; they found that among 1,332 maps from the Berlin Library, 279 used Sea of Korea, Oriental Sea, or East Sea (or some combination thereof), 579 used Sea of Japan exclusively, 47 used China Sea (with or without other names), 33 used other term, and 384 used no term. The ministry said the Struck collection (a collection of antiquarian maps owned by a European map collector) showed that out of 79 maps, 35 used Sea of Japan, 9 used the Sea of Korea, 2 used Oriental Sea, and 33 were unmarked. It also reported that among four Russian libraries and document archives holding 51 maps, 29 used Sea of Japan, 8 used Sea of Korea, 1 used Korea Strait, 1 used East Sea, 1 used Sea of China, and 11 used no name. Among 1,213 maps from the U.S. Library of Congress, the ministry said, ones that gave a name for this body of water showed that 87 percent used Sea of Japan, 8 percent used Sea of Korea, 5 percent used other terms, and none used Oriental Sea or East Sea. Similarly, the ministry said that 58 maps from the British Library and the University of Cambridge showed 86 percent used Sea of Japan, 14 percent used Sea of Korea, and none used Oriental Sea, East Sea, or other terms. The ministry said that they looked at 1,495 maps in the French National Library. They reported that 61 percent of 407 maps published between the 16th and 19th century bore the name Sea of Japan and 15 percent bore the name Sea of Korea, while 95 percent of 215 maps published in the 19th century used Sea of Japan.

=== Geographical arguments ===
Japan argues that, the name Sea of Japan has been and should be used because the marginal sea is separated from the Pacific Ocean by the Japanese archipelago. Korea argues that the adjective "East" describes its geographical position east of the Asian continent, although it is west of Japan and south of Russia. It states that this is analogous to the North Sea, which lies north of the European continent, but west of Scandinavian countries and east of Great Britain.

=== Arguments relating to ambiguity ===
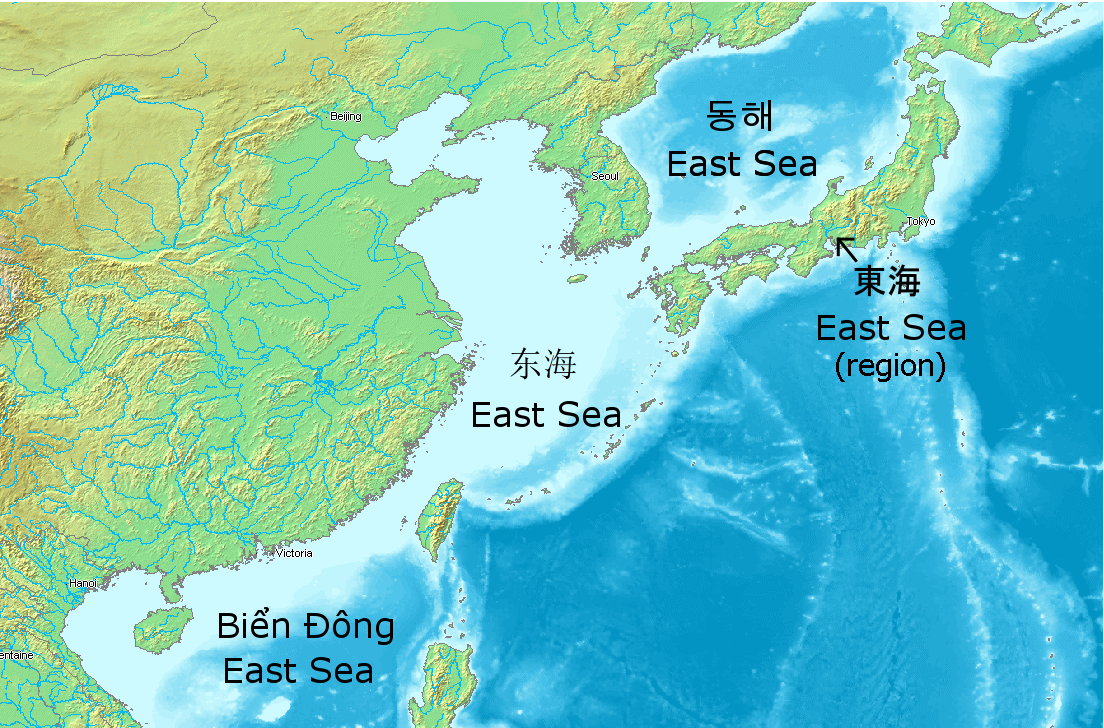
The name "East Sea" is used to refer to several different seas in Eastern Asia.

The Japanese Hydrographic and Oceanographic Department of the Japanese Coast Guard has claimed that the name East Sea is confusing and unsuitable as an international geographic name, because the local name for a variety of seas can be translated into English as East Sea. Examples include Dōng Hǎi (东海), the Chinese name for the East China Sea; Biển Đông, the Vietnamese name for the South China Sea; and the Baltic Sea, whose name is equivalent to East Sea in several European languages such as German (Ostsee), Swedish (Östersjön) and Finnish (Itämeri). East Sea is officially used as an English name for the body of water by the Government of Vietnam and the Government of Vietnam thusly uses East Sea for South China Sea in its English-language publications; likewise, the Ministry of Foreign Affairs of China uses 'East Sea' for the East China Sea in its English-language publications. Even within Japan itself the term East Sea (東海, Tōkai) is already used to refer to the parts of the Pacific Ocean east of middle and upper Honshu, as can be seen in the naming of the Tōkaidō region and the Tōkai region. The Japanese government argues that the name change could set a bad precedent and cause more naming disputes worldwide.

== Position of international bodies ==
The main two international organizations which have been involved in the naming dispute are the International Hydrographic Organization and the United Nations.

=== International Hydrographic Organization ===
==== Limits of Oceans and Seas ====
The International Hydrographic Organization (IHO) coordinates with member countries over hydrographic issues. One of the organization's functions is to standardise the delineation of nautical regions. In 1929, the organization (then called the International Hydrographic Bureau) published edition 1 of "IHO Special Publication 23" (IHO SP 23), titled Limits of Oceans and Seas. This included the limits of the sea area between the Korean Peninsula and Japan, designated as "Japan Sea"; however, at that time, Korea could not participate in the IHO because it was under Japanese rule. The name "Japan Sea" remains in the 3rd edition of SP-23, published in 1953. South Korea officially joined the IHO in 1957.

In 1974, IHO released Technical Resolution A.4.2.6. This resolution stated:

It is recommended that where two or more countries share a given geographical feature (such as a bay, a strait, channel or archipelago) under different names, they should endeavour to reach agreement on a single name for the feature concerned. If they have different official languages and cannot agree on a common name form, it is recommended that the name forms of each of the languages in question should be accepted for charts and publications unless technical reasons prevent this practice on small scale charts.

South Korea has argued that this resolution is relevant to the debate about the Sea of Japan and implies that both names should be used; Japan, however, argues that the resolution does not apply to the Sea of Japan, because it does not specify this body of water and only applies to geographical features for which sovereignty is shared between two or more countries and not applicable to high seas like the sea area between the Korean Peninsula and the Japanese Archipelago. Contrary to Japan's claim, there are no high seas in accordance with the United Nations Convention on the Law of the Sea (UNCLOS) in the sea area between the Korean Peninsula and the Japanese Archipelago. Rather, the sea area is a "semi-enclosed sea" within the meaning of Article 122 of UNCLOS. Even if Japan's interpretation of "high seas" includes exclusive economic zones (EEZs), there is no legal or principled basis to argue that the IHO resolution does not apply to the waters between the Korean Peninsula and Japan as the applicability of the resolutions on dual naming is based on the existence of naming disputes, regardless of the legal status of the sea area. For example, the English Channel/La Manche, which is referred to in the IHO Resolution 1/1972 as an example of concurrent usage, is composed of only the territorial seas and the exclusive economic zones of the UK and France. The East Sea/Sea of Japan is also composed of only territorial seas and exclusive economic zones of its coastal states, which is no different from the case of English Channel/La Manche. Therefore, this resolution should be applicable to the case of East Sea/Sea of Japan.

In 2017, the IHO's 1st Session of the Assembly was held and the member states decided to discuss the future of S-23, taking into account the growing need to modernize the publication, the latest edition of which was published in 1953.

At the 2nd Session of the Assembly in 2020, the member states decided to replace the sea area names in S-23 with unique numerical identifiers and to develop a new digital standard (S-130) that meets the requirements of contemporary geographic information systems. While developing a data-set to designate geographic sea areas by a system of unique numerical identifiers only, S-23 is kept publicly available as it is, as part of existing IHO publication, to demonstrate the evolutionary process from the analogue to the digital era. The IHO adopted S-130, the standard for the Polygonal Demarcations of Global Sea Areas, at the 4th Session of its Assembly, held in Monaco from 19 to 23 April 2026. According to the IHO, the standard provides "a system of unique numerical identifiers for oceans and seas, instead of names" and defines the technical boundaries of global sea areas so as to "enable countries to then use their name of choice in their national products and services". As S-130 introduces a digital charting system that replaces names with numerical identifiers for maritime areas, all IHO charts will no longer bear traditional names like Japan Sea. The South Korean Ministry of Foreign Affairs described the adoption as the result of the country's sustained diplomatic efforts to challenge the exclusive use of the name "Sea of Japan". Japan and South Korea disagree on whether unofficial usage of the name Sea of Japan will decline following S-130's replacement of S-23.

=== United Nations ===
While the United Nations has never directly addressed the issue of establishing an official, standardized name for the sea, several resolutions and statements by the UN have had relevance to the topic. Japan joined the United Nations in 1956, while South Korea and North Korea both joined in 1991.

In 1977, the Third U.N. Conference on the Standardization of Geographical Names (UNCSGN) adopted Resolution III/20, entitled "Names of Features beyond a Single Sovereignty". The resolution recommended that "when countries sharing a given geographical feature do not succeed in agreeing on a common name, it should be a general rule of international cartography that the name used by each of the countries concerned will be accepted. A policy of accepting only one or some of such names while excluding the rest would be inconsistent as well as inexpedient in practice." As with IHO Technical Resolution A.4.2.6, South Korea and Japan disagree about whether or not this policy applies to the East Sea/Sea of Japan.

In 1992, during the 1992 Sixth UNCSGN, the South Korean government, in their first time participating in the UNCSGN, requested that the name of the sea be determined through consultation, which the North Korean representative concurred with. The Japanese representative stated that the name of the Sea of Japan had already been accepted worldwide and that any change would introduce confusion. The conference recommended that the parties work together on the issue outside of the conference.

In 1998, South Korea raised the issue again at the Seventh UNCSGN. Japan, however, opposed the method by which the South Korean government proposed the issue, arguing that they had not followed the proper procedure for doing so. Following some debate, South Korea withdrew the issue, and instead recommended that the United Nations Group of Experts on Geographical Names work so that a resolution could be submitted to the Eighth UNCSGN conference. The president of the conference urged that Japan, South Korea, and North Korea work towards a mutually acceptable agreement.

At the Eighth UNCSGN in 2002, South Korea and Japan presented a number of papers to the conference regarding their positions on the naming issue. South Korea asked for a resolution to adjudicate the name, while Japan asked that the name be decided through resolution outside of the conference. No resolution was passed, and the Committee again urged the countries to develop a mutually agreeable solution. The chairman further noted that standardization could only occur after consensus had been reached. The same situation occurred at the Ninth Conference in 2007. South Korea and North Korea both proposed a resolution by the UNCSGN, while Japan expressed a desire to settle the matter outside of the conference, and the Committee urged the members to seek a mutual agreement.

On 10 March 2004, the United Nations Secretariat affirmed in a written document to the Japanese government that it will continue using the name Sea of Japan in its official documents. However, it agreed to leave the topic open for further discussion. In a letter to South Korea, it was explained that the UN was not determining the validity of either name, but wished to use the term that is most widely used until the parties resolved the disagreement. The letter further stated, "The use of an appellation by the Secretariat based on the practice is without prejudice to any negotiations or agreements between the interested parties and should not be interpreted as advocating or endorsing any party's position, and can in no way be invoked by any party in support of a particular position in the matter."

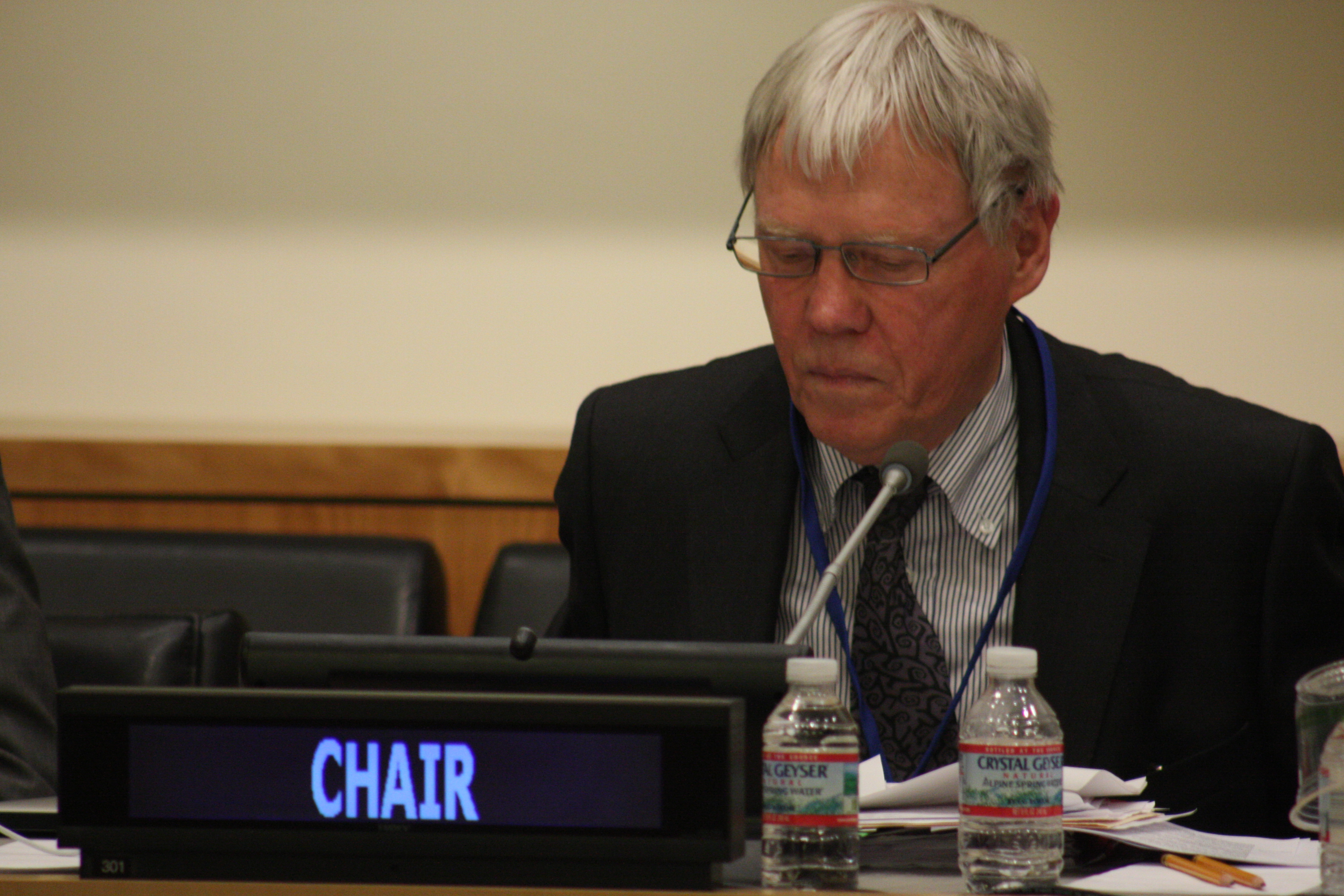
Ferjan Ormeling chairing 28th Session of the UNGEGN, New York 2014

On 6 August 2012, representatives from South Korea and North Korea addressed an assembly at the United Nations Conference on the Standardization of Geographical Names, asking that the names "East Sea" and "Sea of Japan" be used concurrently for the sea. Ferjan Ormeling Jr., chairman of the conference, responded that the organization had no authority to decide the issue and requested that the involved countries resolve the differences over the name amongst themselves.

== Other countries ==
Russia calls this sea "Япо́нское мо́ре" (Yapónskoye móre, Japanese Sea). Japan believes that Russia played a major role in establishing this name internationally, as mentioned above. Chinese government websites exclusively use the name 日本海 (rìběnhǎi, 'Japan Sea'). In 2003, the French Defense Ministry issued nautical maps that included both terms Sea of Japan and East Sea. It reverted to Sea of Japan as a single name in the map issued in 2004. The United Kingdom and Germany officially use the Sea of Japan.

The United States Board on Geographic Names (BGN) continues to advocate the use of Sea of Japan without qualification in U.S. government publications. The World Factbook published by the Central Intelligence Agency follows the BGN's guidance. On 8 August 2011, a spokesman for the United States Department of State stated that the United States Board on Geographic Names considered the official name of the sea to be "Sea of Japan".

Despite the U.S. government's position for the single use of Sea of Japan, in 2011, Virginia state lawmaker David W. Marsden, acting on behalf of Korean-American voters, introduced a bill to the education panel of the Senate of Virginia that would have required public school textbooks to include both "Sea of Japan" and "East Sea" as names. The panel rejected the bill by an 8–7 vote on 26 January 2012. The issue was revisited two years later on 3 February 2014, with the Education Committee of the Virginia House of Delegates passing legislation to use both "Sea of Japan" and "East Sea" in school textbooks. This bill, House Bill (HB) No. 11, was finally passed by the Virginia House of Delegates on 6 February 2014, signed by the Governor on 28 March and became effective on 1 July. The bill states that "all textbooks approved by the Board of Education pursuant to §22.1-238 of the Code of Virginia, when referring to the Sea of Japan, shall note that it is also referred to as the East Sea."

On 29 June 2012, Assistant Secretary of State for East Asian and Pacific Affairs Kurt M. Campbell affirmed the BGN's position in his response, published on the White House website, to the We the People petition concerning the usage of "Sea of Japan", in which he stated, "It is longstanding United States policy to refer to each sea or ocean by a single name. This policy applies to all seas, including those bordered by multiple countries that may each have their own names for such bodies of water. Concerning the body of water between the Japanese archipelago and the Korean Peninsula, longstanding U.S. policy is to refer to it as the "Sea of Japan". He also stated, "We are aware the Republic of Korea refers to the body of water as the 'East Sea,' and the United States is not asking the Republic of Korea to change its nomenclature. U.S. usage of the 'Sea of Japan' in no way implies an opinion regarding any issue related to sovereignty."

For example, the Manual of Style of the National Geographic Society states that disputed place-names in international waters or jointly controlled by two or more countries should use the conventional name first with other names following in parentheses.

Since 2024, Microsoft has adopted a concurrent labeling approach in which both “East Sea/Sea of Japan” and “Sea of Japan/East Sea” are used simultaneously across its map platform.

As of 2025, Google Maps varies the name depending on where the user is accessing from. “Sea of Japan” is displayed to users in Japan, “East Sea” to users in South Korea, and "Sea of Japan (East Sea)" for all other users.

== See also ==
- Anti-Japanese sentiment in Korea
- Anti-Korean sentiment in Japan
- Japanese-Korean disputes
- Geographical renaming
- Persian Gulf naming dispute
- Gulf of Mexico naming controversy
