= Nanhai =

Nanhai (Chinese: 南海; lit. 'South Sea') may refer to:

- Nanhai, the Chinese name for the South China Sea, one of the Four Seas
- Nanhai Commandery, the former Chinese administration over Liangguang
- Nanhai, the Chinese name for the South China Sea Islands
- The Nanhai I, a Chinese wreck from the Southern Song dynasty raised in 2007
- Nanhai, a lake in the Zhongnanhai complex in Beijing
- Nanhai Academy, a collection of cultural and educational facilities located on Nanhai Road in Taipei, Taiwan
- Nanhai District, Foshan, Guangdong
- Nanhai, Hubei (zh), town in Songzi, Hubei
- Nanhai Township (zh), subdivision of Pingtan County, Fujian
- Nanhai Subdistrict, Maoming (zh), in Maogang District, Maoming, Guangdong
- Nanhai Subdistrict, Zhumadian (zh), in Yicheng District, Zhumadian, Henan
- Nanhai, the Chinese name for the star Xi Serpentis

== See also ==
- South Sea (disambiguation)
- Nankai (disambiguation)
- Donghai (disambiguation) ("East Sea")
- Beihai (disambiguation) ("North Sea")
- Xihai (disambiguation) ("West Sea")
- Namhae (disambiguation), the Korean cognate of Nanhai
