= Tokaj (disambiguation) =

Tokaj is a town in northeastern Hungary.

Tokaj may also refer to:

- Tokaj (Slovakia), a wine region in Slovakia
- Tokaj wine region, a historic wine region in Hungary and Slovakia
- Tokaj or Zemplén Mountains, Hungary
- Tokaji, wines from the Tokaj wine region in northeastern Hungary

== See also ==
- Battle of Tarcal or Tokaj, fought in 1527 in Hungary
- Tokai (disambiguation)
- Tokay (disambiguation)
