= Southern Seas =

Southern Seas may refer to:

- Lyndonia (1920), a Curtis steam yacht acquired by Pan American Airways and renamed Southern Seas for use at its Nouméa station, acquired by the U.S. Army for use as USAT Southern Seas then Navy as USS Southern Seas (PY-32) wrecked at Okinawa during typhoon 9 October 1945.
- Gringo-Gaucho (Southern Seas), the U.S. Navy term for joint naval exercise with Argentina.

== See also ==
- South Sea (disambiguation)
- Mar del Sur (disambiguation)
- Southern Ocean
