= West Sea =

West Sea or Western Sea may refer to:

- Atlantic Ocean
- Pacific Ocean
- Indian Ocean
- Mediterranean Sea
- Yellow Sea, as used in Korea
- Baltic Sea, the English translation of the Estonian name for the sea
- North Sea, the English translation of an alternative Danish name for the sea
- Qinghai Lake, the English translation of an alternative Chinese name for the lake and one of the Four Seas
- Sea of the West, mythical sea in North America
- Xihai (disambiguation) (西海), translated into English as West Sea
- West Sea Barrage, Nampho, North Korea

== See also ==
- Western Sea (disambiguation)
- North Sea (disambiguation)
- East Sea (disambiguation)
- South Sea (disambiguation)
- 西海
- West (disambiguation)
- Sea (disambiguation)
