= Donghae =

Donghae (Korean: 동해) may refer to:

- East Sea, the South Korean name of the Sea of Japan
  - Donghae Expressway, the name of the expressway in South Korea
  - Donghae Line, a railway line in Busan, South Korea
- Donghae City, in South Korea
  - Donghae-class corvette, a class of four ships of navy of South Korea
- Lee Donghae (born 1986), member of K-pop boy band, Super Junior

== See also ==
- 東海 (disambiguation), the East Asian script for "East Sea"
  - Donghai (disambiguation), Pinyin romanization
  - Tōkai (disambiguation), Japanese romanization
  - Tunghai (disambiguation), Wade–Giles romanization
