= Battle of Yeonpyeong =

Battle of Yeonpyeong may refer to:

- First Battle of Yeonpyeong (1999; Korean: 제1 연평해전; RR: Je Il Yeonpyeong Haejeon; aka First Battle of Western Sea), Northern Limit Line naval sea battle between North and South Korea
- Second Battle of Yeonpyeong (2002; Korean: 제2 연평해전; RR: Je I Yeonpyeong Haejeon; aka Second Battle of Western Sea), Northern Limit Line naval battle between North and South Korea
- 2010 Yeonpyeongdo bombardment Northern Limit Line artillery duel between North and South Korea
- Battle of Yeonpyeong (film) (Korean: 연평해전; RR: Yeonpyeong Haejeon), a 2015 South Korean film based on the 2002 battle

== See also ==
- List of Korean battles
- Yeonpyeong
- Northern Limit Line
- Western Sea (disambiguation)
