= Tokay =

Tokay may refer to:

== Viniculture ==
- Tokaji (formerly spelled Tokay in English), wines produced in the Tokaj region of Hungary and Slovakia
- Muscadelle, called Tokay in Australia
- Tocai Friulano, a defunct synonym for Sauvignon vert in the Friuli-Venezia Giulia wine region in Italy
- Tokay d'Alsace, an obsolete name for Pinot gris grapes in Alsace
- Tokay (grape), an alternative name for the Hungarian wine grape Furmint
- Viura, a Spanish wine grape with Tokay as a synonym
- Catawba (grape), an American grape with Tokay as a synonym

== Other uses ==
- Tokay gecko, a gecko native to southeast Asia and the Indo-Australian Archipelago
- Tokay High School, a high school in Lodi, California
- Tokay Mammadov (1927–2018), Azerbaijani sculptor-monumentalist
- "Tokay", a song from the 1929 operetta Bitter Sweet
- The former name of Malaga, California
- Tokay blanket, a hobo expression meaning drinking alcohol to stay warm

== See also ==
- Tokai (disambiguation), which covers Tōkai and Tokai
- Tokaj (disambiguation)
