= Mar del Sur (disambiguation) =

Mar del Sur is a town in Argentina.

Mar del Sur might also refer to:

- Pacific Ocean, or Mar del Sur
- South Seas, or Mar del Sur

== See also ==
- South Sea (disambiguation)
- Southern Seas (disambiguation)
- Southern Ocean
