= Tōkaidō =

Tōkaidō may refer to:

- Taiheiyō Belt (also Tōkaidō corridor), the megalopolis in Japan extending from Ibaraki Prefecture to Fukuoka Prefecture
- Tokaido (company), a Japanese company that manufactures karate uniforms, belts, and related products
- Tōkaidō (region), a Japanese geographical term meaning both an ancient division of the country and the main road running through it
- Tokaido, a board game designed by Antoine Bauza

== Transit ==
- Tōkaidō (road), the most important of the Five Routes of the Edo period in Japan
- Tōkaidō Main Line, a major Japanese railway line of the Japan Railways Group network
- Tokaido Shinkansen, a Japanese high-speed rail line that is part of the nationwide Shinkansen network

== See also ==
- Tokai (disambiguation)
