= Beihai (disambiguation) =

Beihai ("North Sea") may refer to the following places in the People's Republic of China:

- Beihai, a prefecture-level city in the south of Guangxi Autonomous Region
- Beihai Park, a park in Beijing, formerly an imperial garden
- Beihaibei station, a station on Line 6 of the Beijing Subway
- Beihai Commandery, a historical commandery in present-day Shandong, China

== See also ==
- Lake Baikal, the "North Sea" (Beihai) of the Four Seas
- Hokkaido, literally means Northern Sea Circuit.
- North Sea
- Nanhai (disambiguation) ("South Sea")
- Donghai (disambiguation) ("East Sea")
- Xihai (disambiguation) ("West Sea")
