= 2010 Yellow Sea conflict =

The 2010 Yellow Sea conflict may refer to the following incidents:

== Korean Peninsula ==
- ROKS Cheonan sinking
- Shelling of Yeonpyeong

== China/Japan ==
- Dandong shooting incident
- Senkaku Islands dispute#2010
- 2010 Senkaku boat collision incident

== United States ==
- USS George Washington (CVN-73)#2010

== See also ==
- Korean War
- Battle of Daecheong
- 2009 North Korean nuclear test
