= Tokai =

Tōkai (東海, literally East Sea) in Japanese may refer to:

- Tōkai region, a subregion of Chūbu
- Tōkai, Ibaraki, a village, also known as "Tokaimura" (Tokai-village)
- Tōkai, Aichi, a city
- 2478 Tokai, a main belt asteroid
- Tōkai (train), a train service between Tokyo Station and Shizuoka Station
- Tōkai Gakki or Tokai Guitars, a Japanese guitar company
- Kyūshū Q1W Tōkai, an anti-submarine bomber of Imperial Navy
- Tokai Tokyo Financial Holdings, a Japanese financial services company

Tokai may refer to:

- Tokai, Cape Town, a large residential suburb of Cape Town, South Africa
- Tokai (character), of Bangladesh, a creation of Rafiqun Nabi
- Tokai (state constituency), a state constituency in Kedah, Malaysia

== See also ==
- Tōkaidō (disambiguation)
- Tokaj (disambiguation)
- Tokay (disambiguation)
- 東海 (disambiguation), the East Asian script for "East Sea"
  - Donghae (disambiguation), Korean romanization
  - Donghai (disambiguation), Pinyin romanization
  - Tunghai (disambiguation), Wade–Giles romanization
