= 北海 =

北海, meaning "North Sea" in Chinese and Japanese, may refer to:

- Hokkai (北海), a disused Japanese name for the Sea of Okhotsk
- Hokkaido (北海道), one of the main islands of Japan
- Beihai Park (北海公园/北海公園), a well-known park in Beijing
- Beihai City (北海市), a prefecture-level city in Guangxi lying on the Gulf of Tonkin
- Lake Baikal (北海), a Siberian lake north of Outer Mongolia
- North Sea (北海((大西洋))), a marginal sea of the Atlantic Ocean located between Great Britain, Scandinavia, Germany, the Netherlands, Belgium, and France
- County, North sea (北海郡), an administrative division during the Western Han period
