= Limits of Oceans and Seas =

Publication by the International Hydrographic Organization

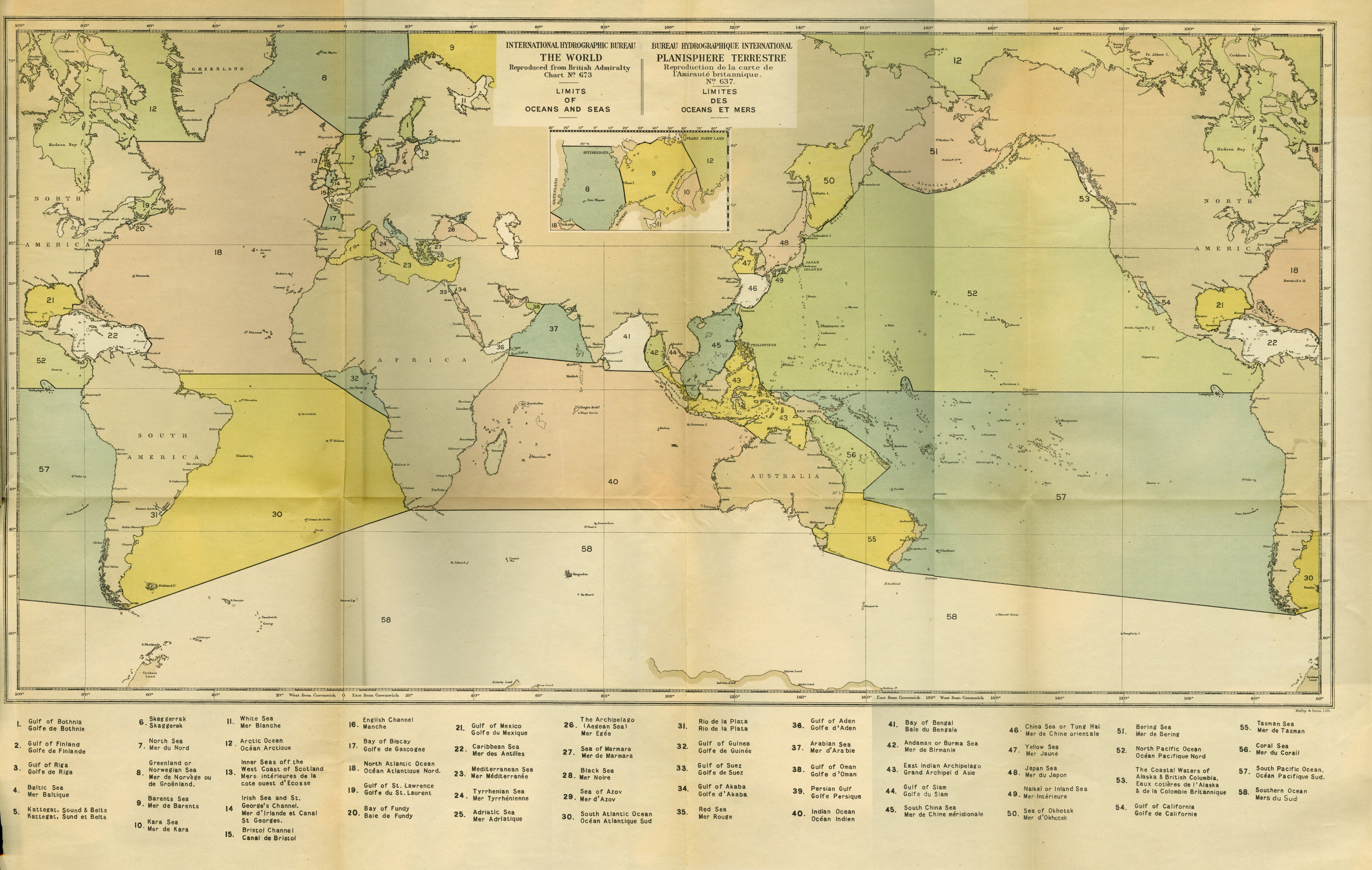
The map accompanying the first edition of Limits of Oceans and Seas

Limits of Oceans and Seas (French: Limites des Océans et Mers or Limites des Océans et des Mers, S-23) is a special publication of the International Hydrographic Organization (IHO) defining the names and borders of the oceans and seas. The publication serves as an international standard for hydrographic surveying and nautical charting and is also consulted by others involved in maritime activities. It is authored by the organization's secretariat, the International Hydrographic Bureau (IHB), and approved by IHO member states. It only covers sea surface features; undersea features are standardized in another IHO publication, the GEBCO Gazetteer of Undersea Feature Names. It is slated to be replaced by a digital dataset by 2026.

== History ==
A resolution at the 1919 International Hydrographic Conference called for the development of an international standard for defining maritime features. The IHB published the first edition of Limits of Oceans and Seas in 1928. Subsequent editions were published in 1937 and 1953. This third edition is currently in force.

The third edition's age is recognized as a growing technical problem, but the IHO member states have been unable to reach agreement on updates to the standard due to political conflicts arising out of the United Nations Conference on the Law of the Sea. A fourth edition was drafted in 1986 and nearly approved. Further development of the working draft began in 1998. Changes included a new title, Names and Limits of Oceans and Seas, and new names for 60 seas. In August 2002, it was resubmitted to IHO member states for approval, with the intention of distributing it in both print and digital formats. However, voting was suspended the following month, pending agreement between South Korea and Japan regarding the international standard name of the sea called "Japan Sea" in the 1953 edition.

The IHO subsequently began work on a digital map of sea limits, Polygonal Demarcations of Global Sea Areas Product Specification and Dataset (S-130), based on modern a geographic information system. In April 2019, diplomats from North and South Korea, the United Kingdom, the United States, and Japan met in private to resolve the Sea of Japan naming dispute. They agreed to adopt a system of numeric identifiers for seas and abandon efforts to revise S-23, leaving in place the analog publication during development of the digital dataset. On November 16, 2020, IHO member states adopted this compromise in a virtual session. The IHO plans to release S-130 by 2026.
