= 東海 =

東海 or 东海 means "East Sea" or "Eastern Sea" in Chinese characters.

In Chinese, it may refer to:

- East China Sea, a marginal sea east of China
  - East Sea (Chinese literature), one of the Four Seas, a literary name for the boundaries of China
- Tunghai University, a university in Taiwan

In Japanese, it may refer to:

- Tōkai region, a subregion of Chūbu facing the Pacific Ocean
- Tōkai, Ibaraki, a village in Ibaraki, Japan
- Tōkai, Aichi, a city in Aichi, Japan
- Tōkai University, a university in Tokyo, Japan
- Tōkai Gakki, a Japanese guitar manufacturer
- Tōkai (train), a train service
- Central Japan Railway Company, a railway operator

In Korean hanja, it may refer to:

- Sea of Japan, a marginal sea of the western Pacific Ocean, bordered by Japan, Korea and Russia
- Donghae, Gangwon, a city in Gangwon, South Korea
- Donghae (singer), a member of the Korean music group Super Junior

== See also ==
- East Sea (disambiguation)
- Donghae (disambiguation), Korean pronunciation
- Tōkai (disambiguation), Japanese pronunciation
- Tunghai (disambiguation), Mandarin Wade–Giles romanization
- Donghai (disambiguation), Mandarin Pinyin romanization
