= 2013 Waterfront Communications Lobbying Scandal =

Danish lobbying scandal

The 2013 Waterfront Communications crisis (Danish: Waterfront-sagen) is the name of a comprehensive lobbying scandal in Denmark.
