= Namhae =

Namhae may refer to:

== Geography ==
- Namhae (sea), the region of ocean near Korea
- Namhae County, a county in South Korea
- Namhaedo or Namhae Island, an island in South Korea
  - Namhae Bridge, which connects Namhaedo and the mainland
- Namhae Castle, Namhaedo

== Other ==
- Namhae of Silla, the second king of Silla

== See also ==
- South Sea (disambiguation)
- Nanhai (disambiguation), the Mandarin Chinese cognate of Namhae
