= Dandong shooting incident =

2010 shooting of Chinese citizens by North Korean border guards

The Dandong shooting incident occurred when North Korean border guards shot dead three Chinese citizens and injured one at Dandong, Liaoning Province, People's Republic of China on 4 June 2010.

== Incident ==
On 4 June 2010, four Chinese citizens were shot on suspicion of crossing the China–North Korea border for trade activities. Three died and one was injured. Qin Gang (秦刚), spokesman for Ministry of Foreign Affairs publicized the news on 8 June. According to South Korean media reports, the people shot were members of a Dandong smuggling group on a ship on Yalu River. Cross-border smuggling is a common occurrence since North Korea is short on commodities supplies. The North Korean soldiers may have fired suspecting the Chinese citizens were South Korean spies after the South became more cautious due to the ROKS Cheonan sinking. North Korean authorities said they were willing to compensate the families of those killed so as not to harm China–North Korea relations.
