= Nankai (disambiguation) =

Nankai (南开) is a series of schools in China.

Nankai (Chinese: 南开; Japanese: 南海) may also refer to:

- Nankai District (南开区), Tianjin, China
- Nankai Electric Railway (南海電気鉄道), a railway company in Japan
- Nankai Club and Nankai Hawks, (南海ホークス), former names of the Fukuoka SoftBank Hawks, a professional Japanese baseball team
- Nankai Broadcasting (南海放送), a radio and television broadcaster in Ehime Prefecture, Japan
- Nankai Trough (南海トラフ), a submarine trough south of Japan
- Nankai megathrust earthquakes (南海巨大地震), a series of earthquakes that occur in and around the Nankai trough
- Nakai, a Japanese food supply ship of WW2, later renamed Nosaki

== See also ==
- Nankaidō, administrative unit in ancient Japan
- 南海 (disambiguation), the East Asian script for "South Sea"
