= Tunghai =

Tunghai, Tung Hai, Tung-Hai may refer to:

- Tunghai University
- East China Sea, from its Mandarin pinyin romanization of its Chinese name (东海)
- East Sea (Chinese literature), from its Mandarin pinyin romanization of its Chinese name (東海), and one of the Four Seas

== See also ==
- Donghai (disambiguation)
- East Sea (disambiguation)
- 東海 (disambiguation), the East Asian script for "East Sea"
