= Tokai Tokyo Financial Holdings =

Japanese financial services holding company

Tokai Tokyo Financial Holdings, Inc. 東海東京フィナンシャル・ホールディングス株式会社
- Company type: Public KK
- Traded as: TYO: 8616
- Industry: Financial services
- Predecessor: Tokai Maruman Securities; Tokyo Securities
- Founded: 2009; 17 years ago
- Headquarters: Chuo-ku, Tokyo, Japan
- Key people: Tateaki Ishida (Chairman, President & CEO)
- Services: Stockbroking; Investment banking
- Revenue: ▲¥89.10 billion (2023)
- Net income: ▲¥10.19 billion (2023)
- Total assets: ▲¥1.4 trillion (2023)
- Total equity: ▲¥192.94 billion (2023)
- Subsidiaries: Tokai Tokyo Securities Co., Ltd.
- Website: www.tokaitokyo-fh.jp

Tokai Tokyo Financial Holdings, Inc. (東海東京フィナンシャル・ホールディングス株式会社, Tōkai Tōkyō Finansharu Hōrudingusu Kabushiki Gaisha) is a Japanese financial services holding company headquartered in Chūō, Tokyo. It is mainly involved in providing brokerage services through its subsidiary Tokai Tokio Securities.

Tokai Tokyo Securities was formed from a merger between Tokai Maruman Securities and Tokyo Securities in 2009. Tokai Maruman itself was the product of a merger between Maruman and Tokai in 1996. Maruman, Tokai and Tokyo Securities were founded in 1908, 1944 and 1929 respectively. In 2009, the group restructured to create Tokai Tokio Financial Holdings as the listed holding company.

The group is present in Asia and the United States through strategic partnerships and alliances. In 2013, it formed business alliances with the Bank of East Asia in Hong Kong and Stifel in the United States.
