= 西海 =

西海, meaning "west sea", may refer to:

In the Chinese reading Xīhǎi:

- Xihai Jun, a prefecture of ancient China
- Qinghai Lake, one of the Four Seas of China

In the Korean reading Seohae, alternatively spelled Sŏhae:

- Sohae University (서해대학교/西海大學校) in Gunsan, South Korea
- Former name of Hwanghae, one of the Eight Provinces of Korea during the Joseon dynasty
- The Yellow Sea, sometimes also called the West Sea of Korea

In the Japanese readings Saikai or Nishiumi:

- Saikaidō, a region of ancient Japan
- Saikai, Nagasaki (西海市), city in Nagasaki Prefecture
- Nishiumi, Ehime (西海町), former village in Ehime Prefecture
