= 2019 Koreas–United States DMZ Summit =

Meeting at the Korean Demilitarised Zone

2019 Koreas–United States DMZ summit
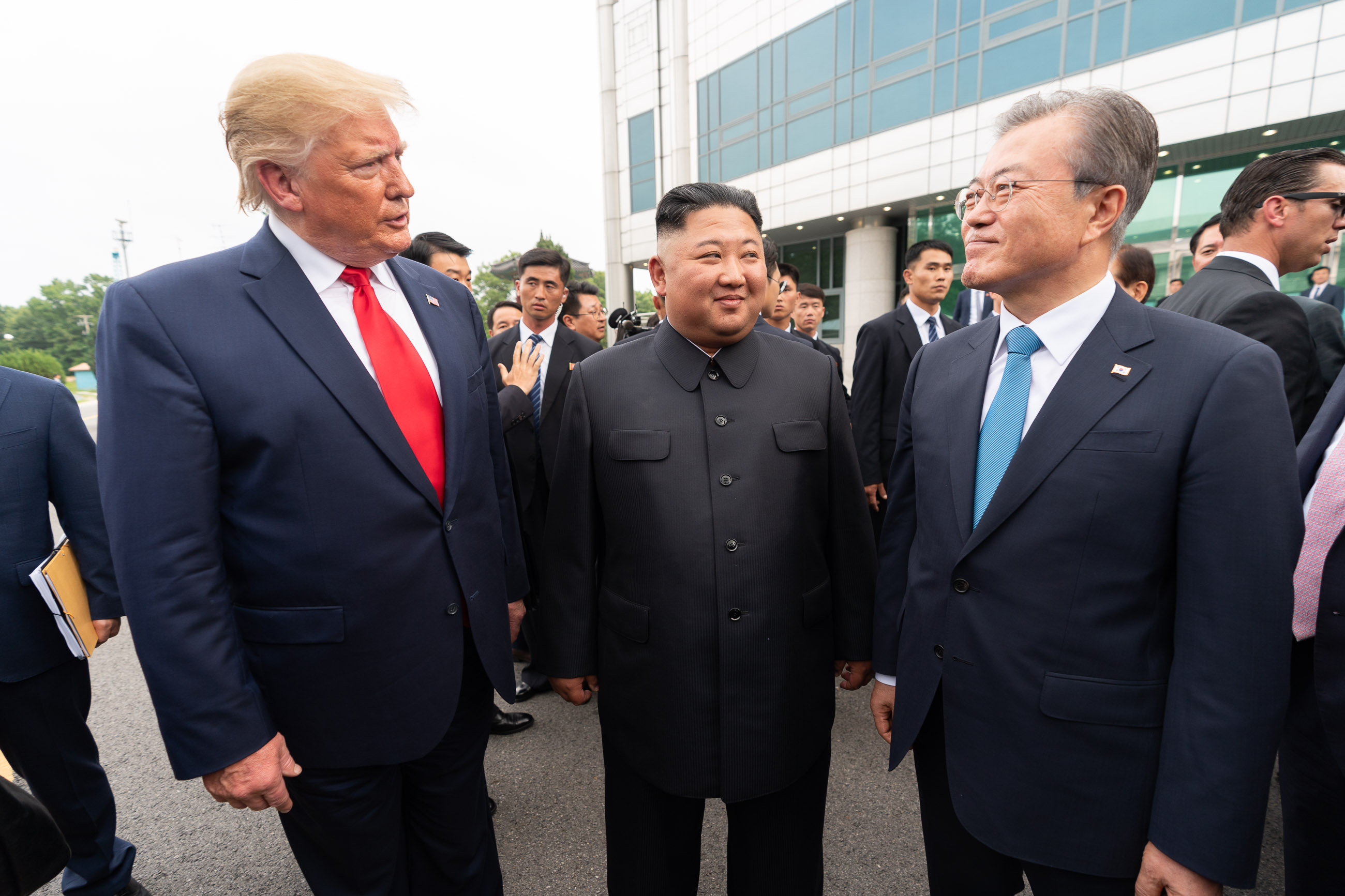
- Trump (left), Kim (center), and Moon (right) talking together in the DMZ.
- Host country: South Korea; North Korea
- Date: June 30, 2019
- Venues: Freedom House, Panmunjom, Demilitarized Zone (DMZ)
- Participants: (South Korea) Moon Jae-in; (North Korea) Kim Jong Un; (United States) Donald Trump
- Follows: 2019 North Korea–United States Hanoi Summit

The 2019 Koreas–United States DMZ Summit was a one-day summit held at the Korean Demilitarized Zone between North Korean chairman Kim Jong Un, U.S. president Donald Trump, and South Korean president Moon Jae-in, following the 2019 G20 Osaka summit. Trump briefly stepped over the border at 3:45 PM (GMT+9) on June 30, marking the first time a sitting U.S. president had set foot on North Korean soil. It was also the second time since the end of the Korean War in 1953 that a North Korean leader entered the South's territory, following the April 2018 inter-Korean summit. Senior White House advisors Ivanka Trump and Jared Kushner (Trump's daughter and son-in-law) also attended the summit, with Ivanka Trump and U.S. envoy to South Korea Harry B. Harris Jr. holding a meeting with Kim later broadcast on North Korean television.

== Background ==
A number of other sitting U.S. presidents had previously traveled to the Korean Demilitarized Zone (DMZ) and seen North Korea through binoculars, but none had previously met the leaders of North Korea or actually traveled within North Korean territory.

Trump and Kim held talks on February 27 and 28, 2019, in the Vietnamese capital of Hanoi, regarding the nuclear issue. At Hanoi, North Korea sought the removal of all significant economic sanctions; in return, it proposed partially reducing its capacity to construct new nuclear weapons, while retaining its existing nuclear arsenal. Trump, meanwhile, offered economic aid to North Korea in exchange for denuclearization. The two countries did not come to agreement, and talks eventually collapsed. In the aftermath of Hanoi, North Korean state media "angrily denounced the U.S. position" but "refrained from criticizing Trump directly and even referred to the positive relationship between the two leaders, a sentiment consistently echoed by Trump himself."

On June 12, 2019, Trump told reporters that he received a "beautiful letter" from Kim that was "very personal, very warm, very nice," praised Kim's leadership, and said that the letter was a sign that talks would resume. Kim received a reply from Trump on June 23, 2019, which Kim praised as "excellent"; North Korean state media stated that "Appreciating the political judging faculty and extraordinary courage of President Trump, Kim Jong Un said that he would seriously contemplate the interesting content."

== Announcement ==
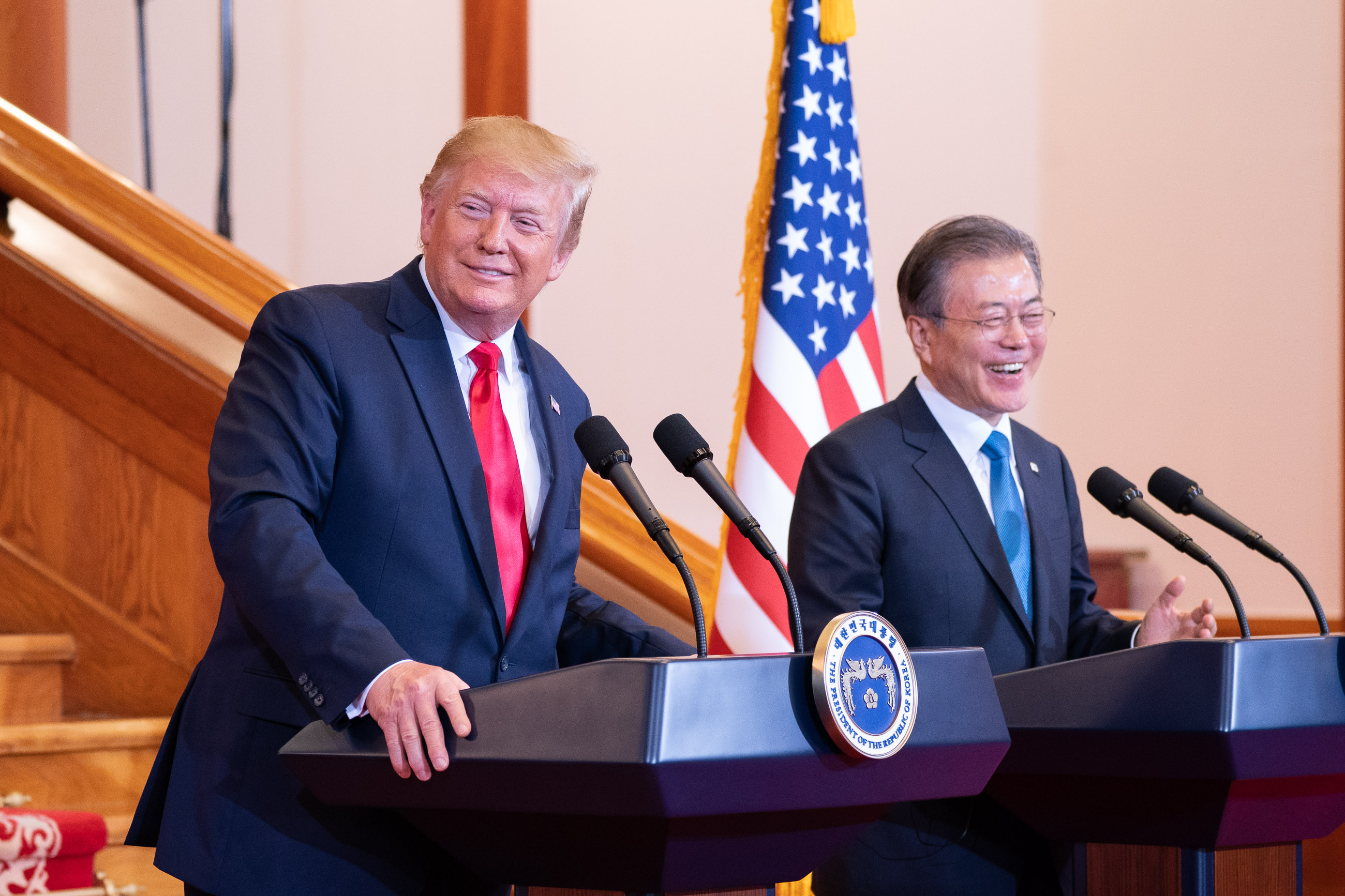
Moon and Trump announcing the DMZ summit at the press conference

On June 24, 2019, the Blue House confirmed that Trump would be making a visit to South Korea on June 30 and that the White House was trying to schedule a visit to the Korean Demilitarized Zone. On the morning of June 29, at the G20 summit, Trump tweeted, "If Chairman Kim of North Korea sees this, I would meet him at the Border/DMZ just to shake his hand and say Hello(?)!" Five hours later, North Korean Foreign Minister Ri Yong-ho asked the U.S. to issue a formal notice. On the evening of the same day, Ri Yong-ho met with Stephen Biegun, the U.S. State Department's Special Representative for North Korea, at Panmunjom, in preparation for the summit. During the South Korea–U.S. Summit, South Korean president Moon Jae-in announced that Trump would be meeting Kim during his visit at the DMZ. Moon predicted that a handshake between Trump and Kim at the DMZ would be a "milestone" for denuclearization efforts on the peninsula.

Although the meeting was billed as a spontaneous or impromptu meeting, Kim and Trump had exchanged letters earlier in the month. Andrei Lankov of Kookmin University "said it was inconceivable that the leaders of two powerful nations had arranged a meeting at such short notice. He described it as a 'show' designed to send a political message without raising expectations about actual progress."

According to the book of John Bolton, the U.S. national security adviser at that time, Trump didn't want Moon to join him during his third meeting with Kim in the DMZ.

== Summit ==
Trump stepping into North Korean territory by crossing the low stone curb separating the North and South at 3:45 p.m. KST (2:45 a.m. EDT), becoming the first U.S. president to step into North Korea since the Korean War

Following the conclusions of the 2019 G20 Osaka summit in Japan, on June 30, 2019, Trump and South Korean president Moon Jae-in visited the DMZ before the meeting with North Korean leader Kim Jong Un. Kim invited Trump to cross the border line, and Trump briefly crossed in North Korea before crossing back into South Korea together with Kim. Trump thus became the first sitting U.S. president to enter North Korea. (Note: Former 39th and 42nd U.S. Presidents Jimmy Carter and Bill Clinton had previously visited North Korea after they left office.) Before crossing into North Korea, Kim told Trump in Korean, "it's good to see you again" and "I never expected to meet you at this place", and shook hands with Trump. Trump said it was "my honor" to enter North Korea. During their meeting, Trump also invited Kim to the White House, although later acknowledged that this would probably not occur in the near term. Trump said of Kim: "A lot of really great things are happening, tremendous things. We met and we liked each other from Day One, and that was very important." Moon later joined Trump and Kim, and the three spoke for a brief moment before Kim and Trump held a 53-minute-long private meeting inside the Freedom House.

Trump's top advisor Ivanka Trump, senior advisor Jared Kushner, Secretary of the Treasury Steven Mnuchin, and United States ambassador to South Korea Harry B. Harris, Jr., accompanied Trump to the DMZ. Ivanka Trump joined the president in his meeting with Kim. Moon did not attend; the North Korean Foreign Ministry had announced a week before that he was not welcome, telling South Korean authorities to "mind their own business at home".

In remarks after the meeting, Kim said, "By meeting here, which is a symbol of division, the symbol of a hostile past...we are presenting to the world that we have a new present, and this is announcing to the world that we will have positive meetings going forward."

== Aftermath ==
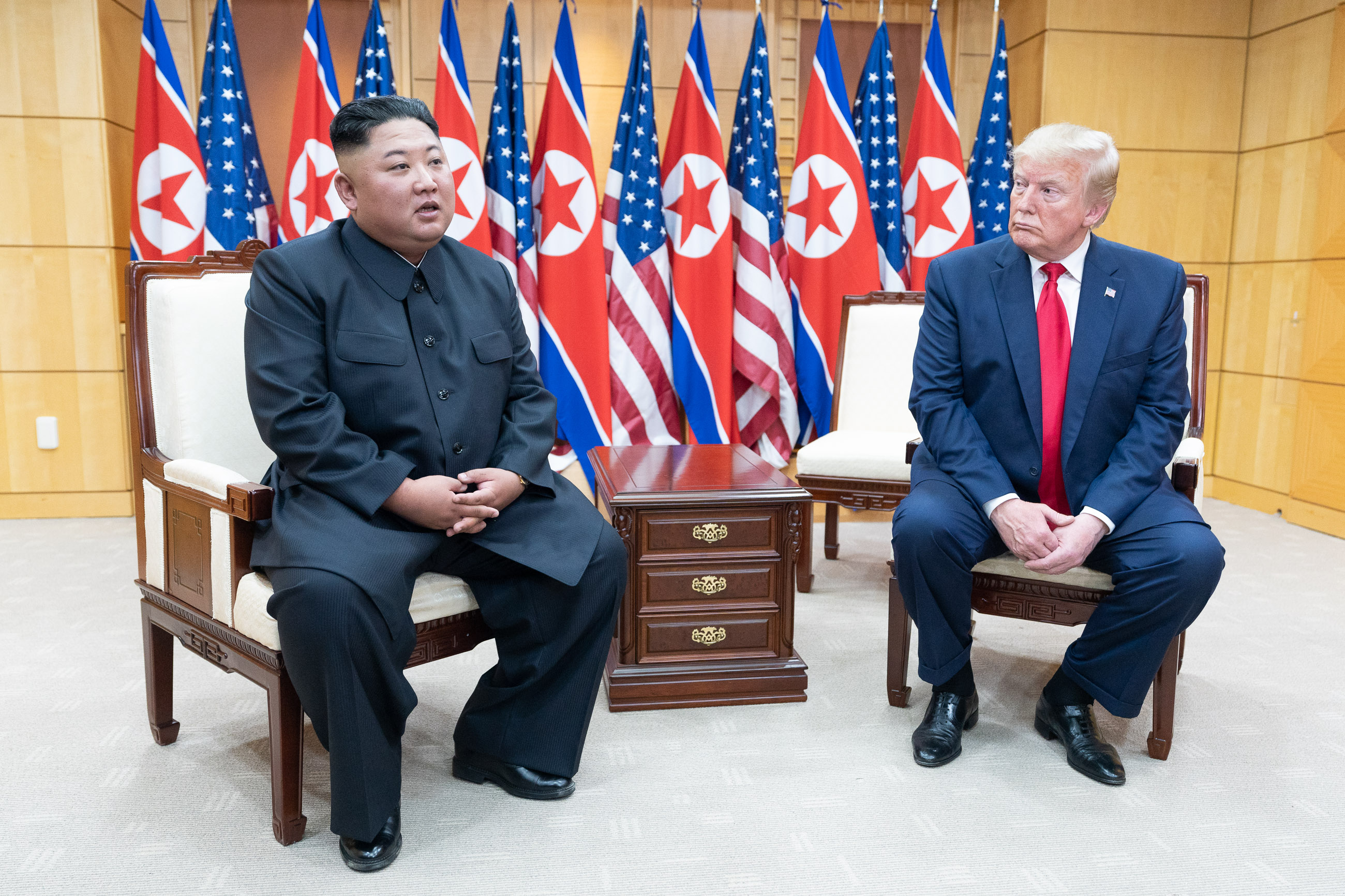
Chairman Kim and President Trump speaking to reporters during a press conference

Following the nuclear summit, both sides had announced the resumption of "working-level" nuclear talks. U.S. secretary of state Mike Pompeo said that Trump administration negotiators would meet North Korean counterparts to resume denuclearization talks in mid-July. U.S. special envoy to North Korea, Stephen Biegun, would lead the U.S. negotiators; the North Korean lead negotiator has not been appointed, although senior diplomat Choe Son-hui was viewed as a likely choice.

David E. Sanger and Michael Crowley, in an analysis for The New York Times, wrote that in the lead-up to the meeting, Trump administration officials had been internally considering the prospect that a new round of U.S.–North Korea negotiations could lead to the U.S. accepting "a nuclear freeze, one that essentially enshrines the status quo, and tacitly accepts the North as a nuclear power," rather than complete denuclearization. Under this possible outcome, North Korea would halt the growth of its nuclear arsenal, but would not dismantle any of the estimated 20–60 existing nuclear weapons already in its stockpile, and would not curb its ballistic missile capabilities. Biegun said that commentary about possible outcomes was speculative and said he was "not preparing any new proposal currently".

== Reactions ==
=== South Korea ===
The meeting was "broadly welcomed in South Korean political circles," including from the ruling Democratic Party (whose chairman called it "another milestone toward peace on the Korean Peninsula") and the conservative Liberty Korea Party, the main opposition party. The chairman of Liberty Korea Party announced that "it is a good sign for breaking the deadlock in the nuclear talks." Myong-hyun Go, Research Fellow of the Asan Institute for Policy Studies which is one of the top 5 think tanks for foreign policy and defense area in South Korea, analyzed DMZ summit as a positive direction. Go emphasized the crucial role of South Korea, President Moon between Trump and Kim as a negotiator. Go also said a small deal between the United States and the DPRK, similar to the Iran nuclear deal, might be feasible if Trump concluded that it was more realistic than a big deal. However, Andrei Lankov of Kookmin University stated that both Kim and Trump "needed something that is strong on optics but weak on substance" and that the DMZ meeting was intended to convey a political message without raising expectations about progress toward an actual agreement on the North Korean nuclear issue.

=== North Korea ===
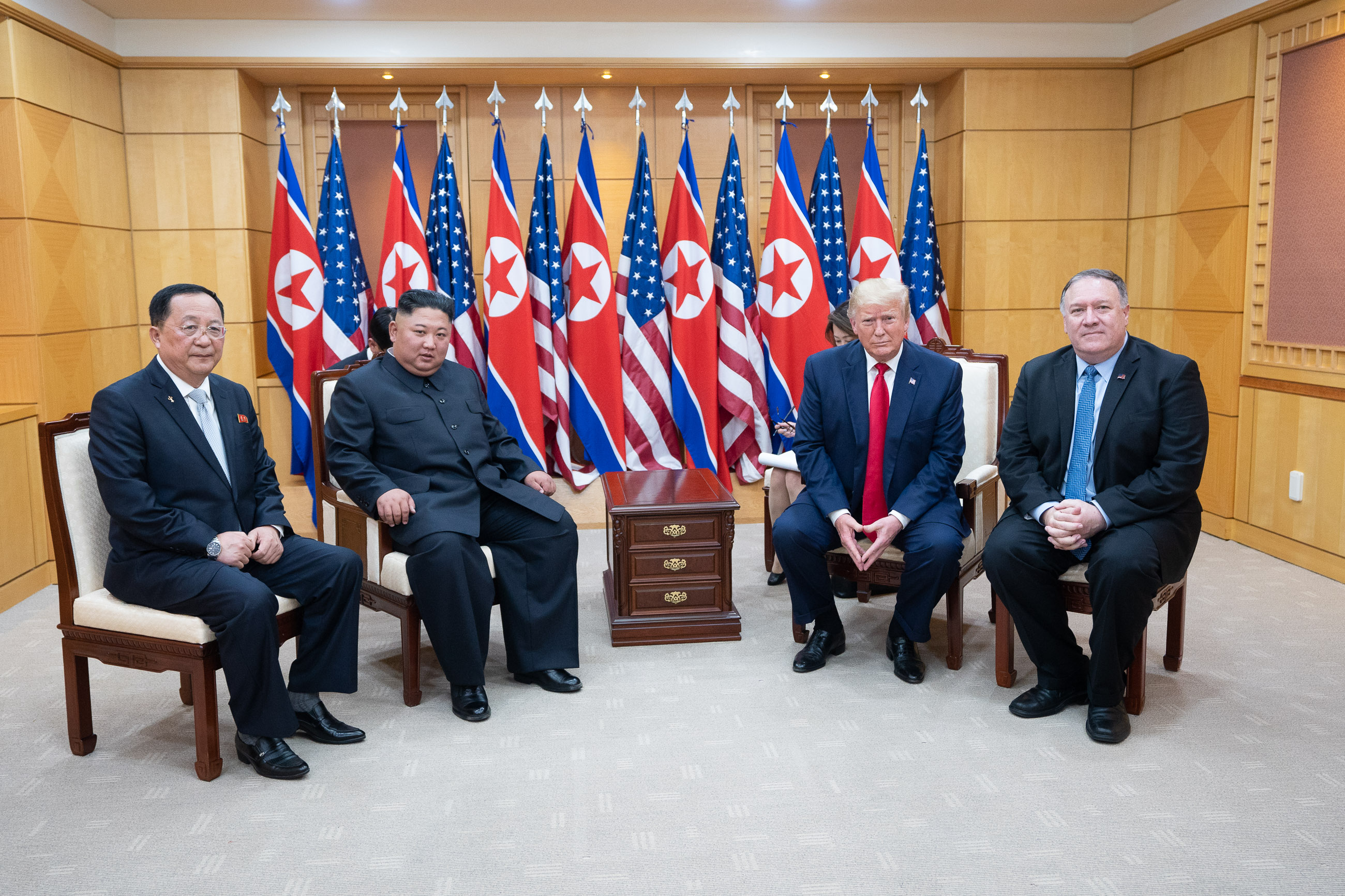
Chairman Kim and President Trump including U.S. secretary Mike Pompeo, DPRK Minister Ri Yong-ho talking to reporters

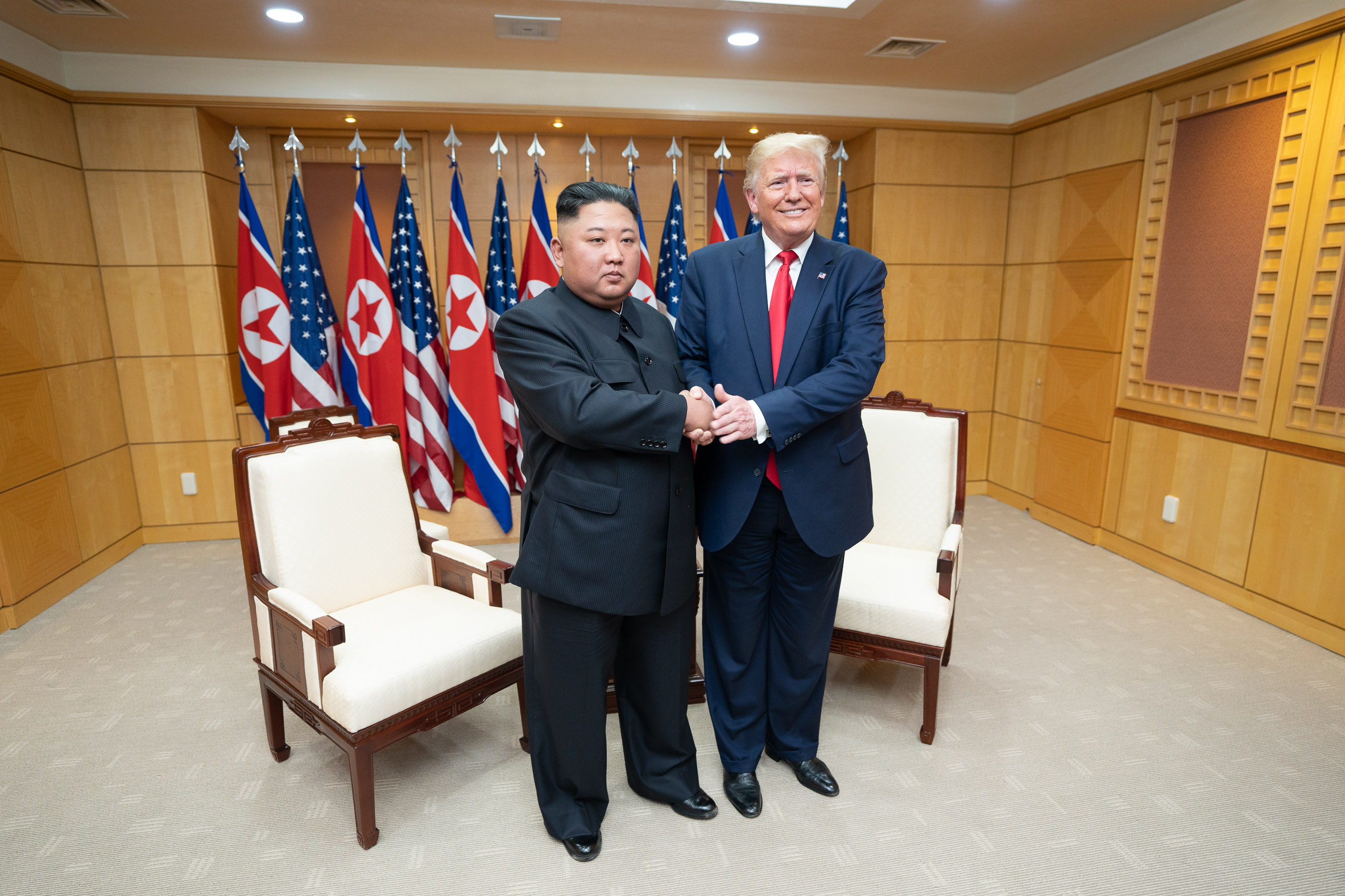
Trump and Kim in the Freedom House of DMZ

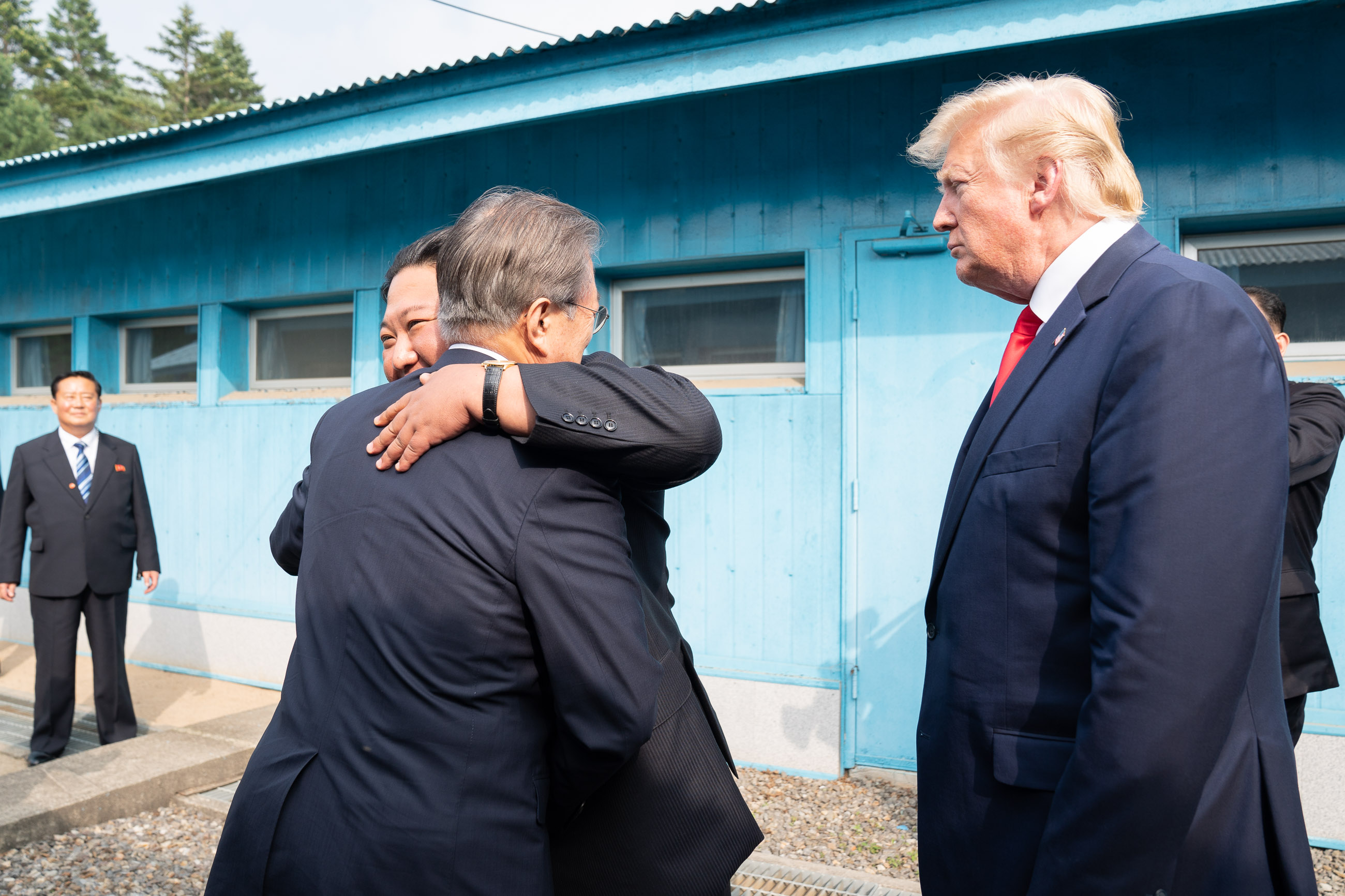
Moon and Kim bid farewell at the end of the summit

North Korean state media praised Trump's visit as "historic" and "an amazing event", and extensively covered the event for KCNA, the state TV network, and Rodong Sinmun, a state newspaper. Kim was quoted in the Rodong Sinmun as saying that "a dramatic meeting like today could take place in one day due to positive friendly relationship with President Trump." Anna Fifield of The Washington Post and Nic Robertson of CNN described the meeting as an important propaganda victory for Kim. However, Foreign Ministry adviser of North Korea Kim Kye-gwan announced that meeting with Trump only served U.S. Interests and pride of U.S. president. DPRK would be interested in another summit with Trump only if U.S. offers mutually acceptable terms between two countries to salvage nuclear diplomacy.

=== United States ===
During a news conference with South Korean president Moon Jae-in, Trump falsely claimed that "President Obama wanted to meet and Chairman Kim would not meet him. The Obama administration was begging for a meeting." Former Trump administration deputy national security advisor K.T. McFarland compared the Trump–Kim DMZ meeting to the Nixon–Mao meeting in 1972, dismissed critics of the meeting, and said "If Kim doesn't deliver on this, I think he may have potential problems within his own leadership cadre."

A number of Democratic members of the U.S. Congress, candidates for the Democratic nomination for president in 2020, and general critics of Trump criticized his decision to meet with Kim. The Joe Biden campaign denounced Trump for "coddling" dictators while making "numerous concessions for negligible gain"; candidate Elizabeth Warren tweeted, "Our president shouldn't be squandering American influence on photo ops and exchanging love letters with a ruthless dictator." Critics also took exception to the president's decision to meet with Kim two years after the death of Otto Warmbier, an American college student who was arrested and imprisoned by North Korea after being accused of Subversion (through attempted theft of a propaganda poster), and suffered a fatal brain injury in North Korean captivity.

U.S. foreign policy analysts were generally critical of the meeting. Jean H. Lee, the director of the Center for Korean History and Public Policy, wrote that, "There's a reason why past presidents chose not to go to North Korea while in office: Such visits grant enormous legitimacy to the Kims." Samantha Vinograd, a member of the National Security Council during the Obama administration, said that by meeting Kim at the DMZ without preconditions attached, Trump was signaling that North Korea was "a normalized, nuclear power." Analyst, columnist, and frequent Trump critic Max Boot wrote that the DMZ meeting was "symbolism utterly devoid of substance" and argued that Kim had taken advantage of a "gullible" Trump to improve his own legitimacy. Commentator S. Nathan Park, however, viewed the third Trump–Kim meeting as a positive trust-building event that could be viewed as "necessary to get the working level talks back on track." Park wrote that although "one must be clear-eyed to the reality that a tangible result has not yet materialized in Trump's North Korea diplomacy," patience could lead to more concrete impacts.

=== China ===
China’s foreign minister Wang Yi called the Kim–Trump DMZ meeting a "rare opportunity for peace" and said that Paramount leader Xi Jinping had urged the U.S. to "show flexibility" by easing its sanctions against North Korea in gradual "action-for-action" phases, rather than offering sanctions relief only upon complete nuclear disarmament. Cheong Seong-chang of the Sejong Institute, a South Korean think tank, said that in meetings between Kim and Xi in North Korea, "Xi pledged economic cooperation and a security guarantee to North Korea in exchange for Pyongyang's continued effort on denuclearization negotiations." Koh Yu-hwan, a North Korean studies professor at Dongguk University in Seoul, agreed that Xi had facilitated the Trump–Kim meeting.

=== Other ===
Japanese Prime Minister Shinzō Abe said that "Japan has been supporting the U.S.-DPRK negotiation process since their Singapore meeting."

The Catholic leader Pope Francis praised the summit as "a step further in the walk of peace" for the Korean Peninsula and "the entire world."

Qatar's Al Jazeera assessed that the DPRK-U.S. summit meeting at the DMZ provided a meaningful stepping stone for Trump's negotiations and created an opportunity to resume the nuclear negotiations with North Korea, which could be an essential milestone in U.S. diplomacy.

== Post-summit developments ==
On October 5, U.S. and North Korean officials held working-level nuclear talks in Stockholm, Sweden, but did not reach any agreement. The U.S. side proposed helping North Korea develop the Wonsan-Kalma coastal tourist area (near the Kalma Airport). After the Stockholm meeting, Pyongyang's chief nuclear negotiator Kim Myong-gil said further talks would depend on will of the U.S. Swedish Special Envoy Kent Härstedt expressed cautious optimism that the talks would continue. In November, North Korea's U.N. Mission announced that the country has gained no progress from U.S although two leaders committed to establishing a new relationship during the first US-DPRK summit. Vice Minister of DPRK Choe Son-hui said another US-North Korea summit would be feasible if the U.S. removed “hostile policy” toward Pyongyang. North Korea has called for an end to joint military drills of USFK.

=== Revitalization of the senior officials channel to DPRK ===
On September 10, Trump sacked National Security Advisor John Bolton, saying he strongly disagreed with Bolton's suggestion about applying the Libyan model to the North Korea nuclear deal and mentioning Muammar Gaddafi. Donald Trump selected hostage negotiator of DPRK Robert O'Brien as the new U.S. national security adviser. Some of Senate Republicans including Lindsey Graham praised Trump's pick and mentioned, "he's got great negotiating skills", and "he would be a very sound policy adviser." North Korea envoy Stephen Biegun was confirmed as deputy secretary of state which is Pompeo's number two. While Pompeo was recognized as a protector of Trump, Biegun is unknown for his partisanship.

=== Request of working level talk to North Korea ===
On December 11, 2019, during a U.N. Security Council meeting, U.S. Ambassador to the United Nations Kelly Craft announced that the U.S. was ready "to simultaneously take concrete steps" with a flexible approach for a 'balanced agreement"/nuclear deal with the DPRK. Craft at the same time warned North Korea that its “deeply counterproductive” ballistic missile tests risked closing the door on prospects for negotiating peace. Craft emphasized that the Security Council would be ready to “act accordingly” by Security Council action if North Korea resumed “serious provocations". Craft while chairing the UN Security Council requested North Korea return to the negotiation table in order to take concrete, parallel steps toward a nuclear agreement.

== See also ==
- Peace Treaty on Korean Peninsula
- List of international trips made by Kim Jong Un
- 2017–18 North Korea crisis
- Iran nuclear deal
- Kim–Xi meetings
- Kim–Putin meetings
- Inter-Korean summits
- April 2018 inter-Korean summit
- 2018 North Korea–United States Singapore Summit
- 2019 North Korea–United States Hanoi Summit
- North Korea–United States relations
- South Korea–United States relations
- North Korea–South Korea relations
- John Bolton, The Room Where It Happened, Simon & Schuster. 2020.
