= 2019 North Korea–United States Hanoi Summit =

Meeting between Kim Jong Un and Donald Trump

2019 North Korea–United States Hanoi Summit Hanoi Summit
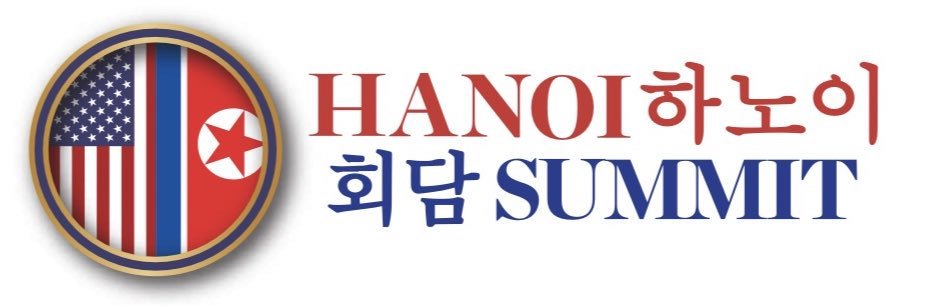
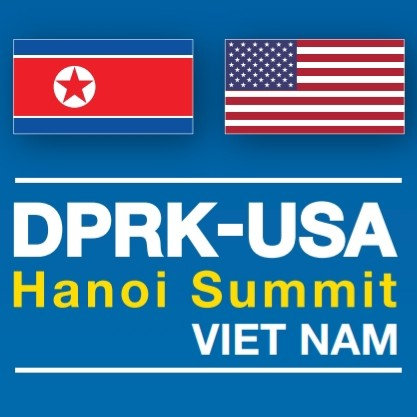
- Logo used by the United States Logo used by Vietnam

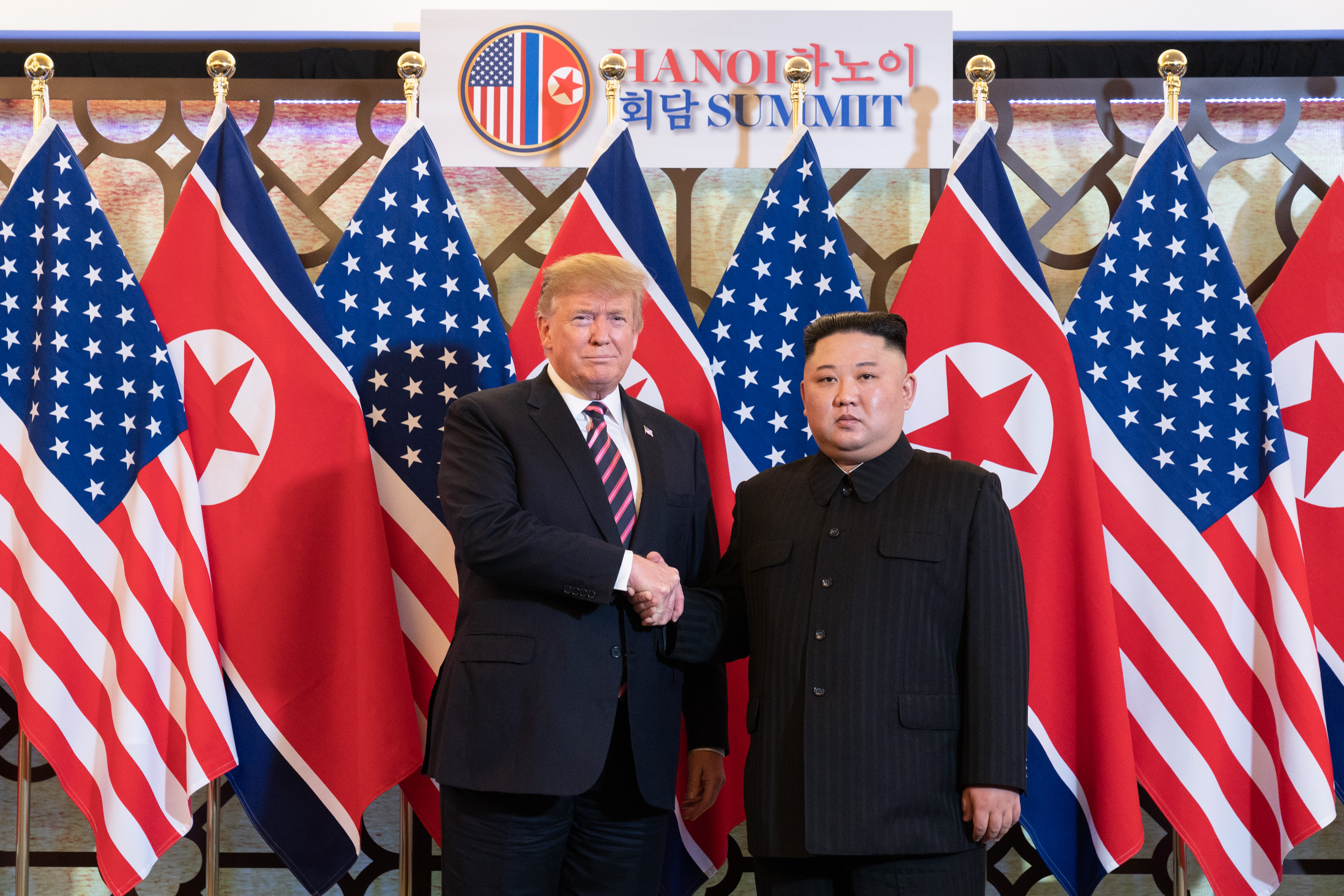
- President Donald Trump and Supreme Leader Kim Jong Un shaking hands at the start of the summit
- Host country: Vietnam
- Date: February 27–28, 2019
- Venues: Hôtel Métropole, Hanoi
- Participants: (United States) Donald Trump (North Korea) Kim Jong Un
- Follows: 2018 North Korea–United States Singapore Summit
- Precedes: 2019 Koreas–United States DMZ Summit
- Website: dprk-usasummit2019.mofa.gov.vn

2019 North Korea–United States Hanoi Summit

North Korean name
- Chosŏn'gŭl: 제2차 조미수뇌회담
- Hancha: 第2次 朝米首腦會談
Transcriptions
- Revised Romanization: Je-icha Jomi sunoehoedam
- McCune–Reischauer: Che-ich'a Chomi sunoehoedam

South Korean name
- Hangul: 북미 2차 정상회담
- Hanja: 北美 二次 頂上會談
Transcriptions
- Revised Romanization: Bungmi icha jeongsanghoedam
- McCune–Reischauer: Pungmi ich'a chŏngsanghoedam

The 2019 North Korea–United States Hanoi Summit, commonly known as the Hanoi Summit, was a two-day summit meeting between North Korean supreme leader Kim Jong Un and U.S. president Donald Trump, held at the French Colonial Hôtel Métropole in Hanoi, Vietnam, from February 27 to 28, 2019. It was the second meeting between the leaders of North Korea and the United States following their first meeting in Singapore the year prior.

On February 28, 2019, the White House announced that the summit was cut short and that no agreement was reached. Trump later clarified that it was due to North Korea's request to end all sanctions. North Korean foreign minister Ri Yong-ho asserted that the country only sought a partial lifting of the five United Nations sanctions placed on North Korea between 2016 and 2017.

== Background ==
The first North Korea–United States summit between Kim Jong Un and Donald Trump took place in June 2018 in Singapore with the objectives of resolving the long-term Korean conflict involving ICBM nuclear weapons and denuclearization of the Korean Peninsula. A series of bilateral summits was held between North Korean leader Kim Jong Un, CCP general secretary Xi Jinping, South Korean president Moon Jae-in, and US president Donald Trump.

== Announcement ==
The White House confirmed the planned summit between Kim Jong Un and Trump on September 11, 2018. U.S. secretary of state Mike Pompeo stated that North Korea and the U.S. were "working diligently" to make sure the conditions were right for the summit.

Trump stated the host country would be Vietnam, and the dates to be February 27 to 28, during his second State of the Union Address on February 5, 2019. He later announced that the summit would take place in Hanoi.

== Vietnam's reactions and preparations ==
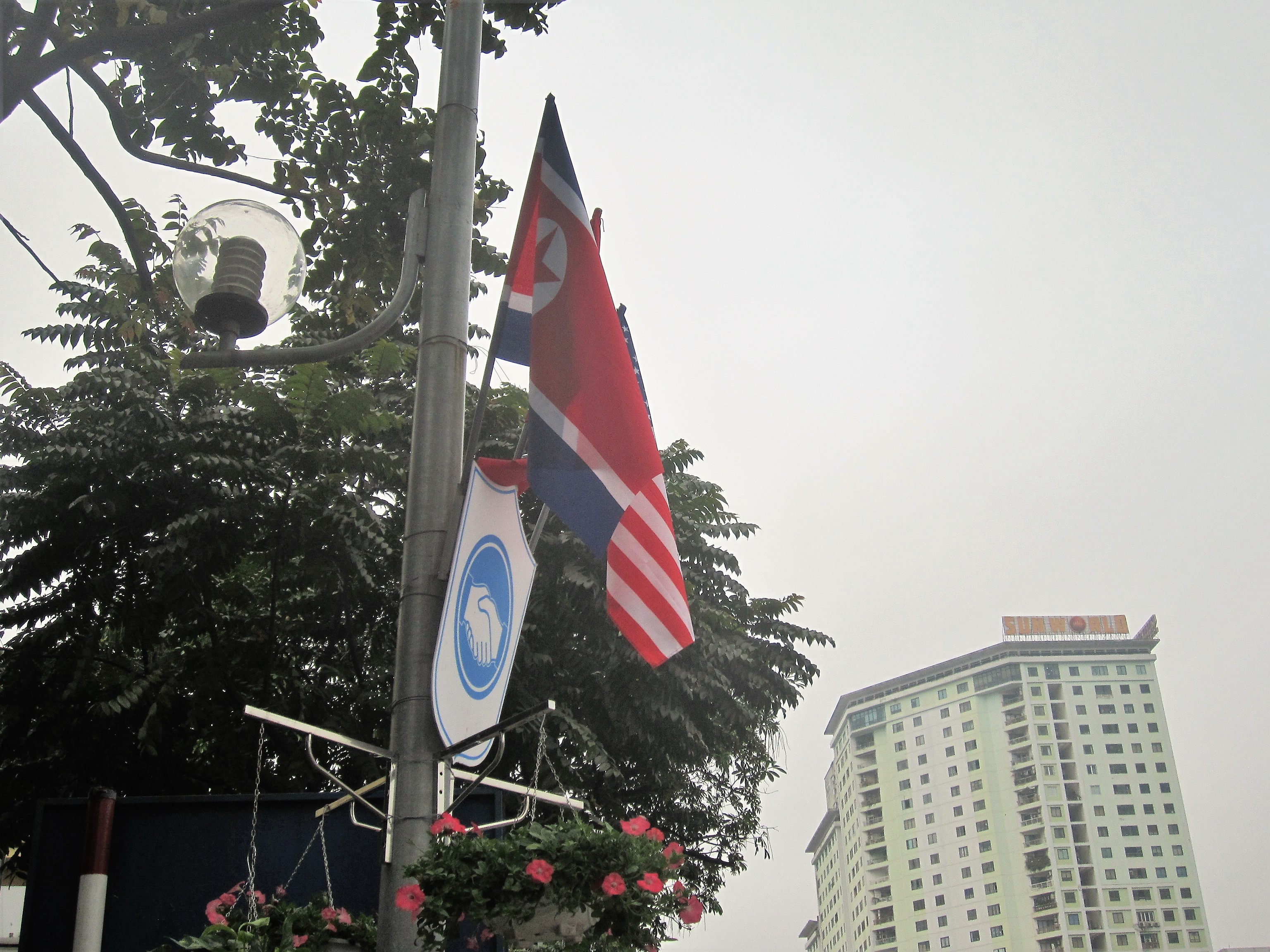
US, North Korea and Vietnam flags on Nguyễn Chí Thanh street

Vietnamese Deputy Prime Minister and Foreign Minister Phạm Bình Minh visited North Korea at North Korean Foreign Minister Ri Yong-ho's invitation from February 12 to 14. The visit came ahead of the summit, which a spokeswoman from the Vietnamese Foreign Ministry said in a statement posted on Twitter.

== Developments since the June 2018 Summit ==
Pompeo appointed Stephen Biegun as United States Special Representative for North Korea on August 23, 2018.

In September 2018, The New York Times reported that "North Korea is making nuclear fuel and building weapons as actively as ever" but did so quietly, "allowing Mr. Trump to portray a denuclearization effort as on track." Two months later, The Times reported that North Korea appeared to be engaged in a "great deception" by offering to dismantle one missile base while developing sixteen others, and that this expansion program was long known to American intelligence but contradicted Trump's public assertions that his diplomacy was yielding results. Immediately following the June 2018 summit, Trump had declared "There is no longer a Nuclear Threat from North Korea ... sleep well tonight!"

A third inter-Korean summit was held from September 18 to 20, 2018, seeking a breakthrough in stalled talks with the U.S. and a solution to the denuclearization of the Korean peninsula.

In November 2018, North Korea repeated its demand that U.S. economic sanctions be lifted as a condition for proceeding with talks, while the Trump administration continued to insist that North Korea make concessions first. Meetings between Pompeo and North Korean officials were scheduled, canceled due to disagreements, and then rescheduled. The February 2019 summit was confirmed after Kim Yong-chol, North Korea's top negotiator, met with Trump in the Oval Office on January 18, 2019.

In the days leading up to the summit, Trump declared that former president Barack Obama had been on the verge of going to war with North Korea and had told Trump so during the transition, which suggested that Trump had pulled the U.S. back from the brink of war; former Obama aides denied these claims. Trump also suggested that he deserved the Nobel Peace Prize for his diplomacy with North Korea, with the U.S. informally asking Japan to nominate Trump, according to Japanese newspaper Asahi Shimbun, which reported Shinzo Abe doing so, but reports were neither confirmed nor denied, as it is tradition to keep nominations confidential. Noting that one of North Korea's primary objectives is to replace the Korean Armistice Agreement with a peace treaty to formally end the Korean War, Scott Snyder, the senior fellow for Korea studies at the Council on Foreign Relations, observed, "What I worry about is the president may want the peace most — more than the denuclearization...[o]ne of the big worries that people have is that somehow the president is going to trade the alliance for the prospect of a Nobel Peace Prize."

Top American intelligence officials testified to Congress in January 2019 that it was unlikely North Korea would fully dismantle its nuclear arsenal, and Trump's national security advisor John Bolton continued to believe North Korea could not be trusted and that denuclearization efforts would fail.

Trump asserted that North Korea's pause of weapons testing since the Singapore summit was a sign of progress, but Bruce Klingner of The Heritage Foundation said there had been longer testing pauses during previous administrations.

In the summit, wide gaps persisted between the two countries, including disputes on what the exact definition of denuclearization entailed. In January, Biegun had repeated the official American stance that sanctions on North Korea would not be lifted until the country had fully denuclearized. On January 31, 2019, Biegun indicated that American negotiators may not demand that North Korea provide a full inventory of its nuclear and missile programs as a first step toward denuclearization, a demand that North Korea had been resisting.

== Preparations ==
=== Preparatory talks ===
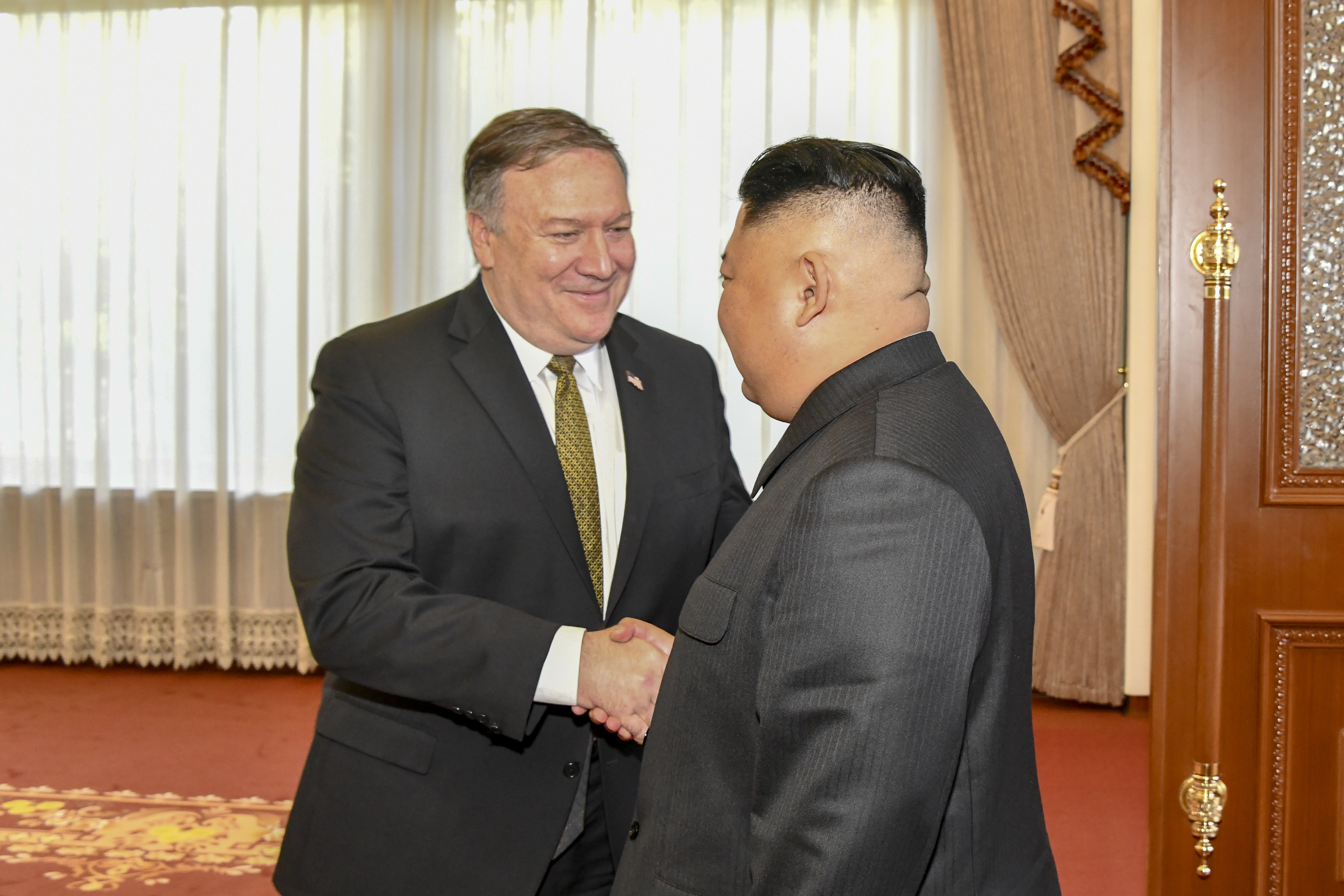
United States Secretary of State Mike Pompeo with North Korea's Chairman Kim Jong Un in Pyongyang

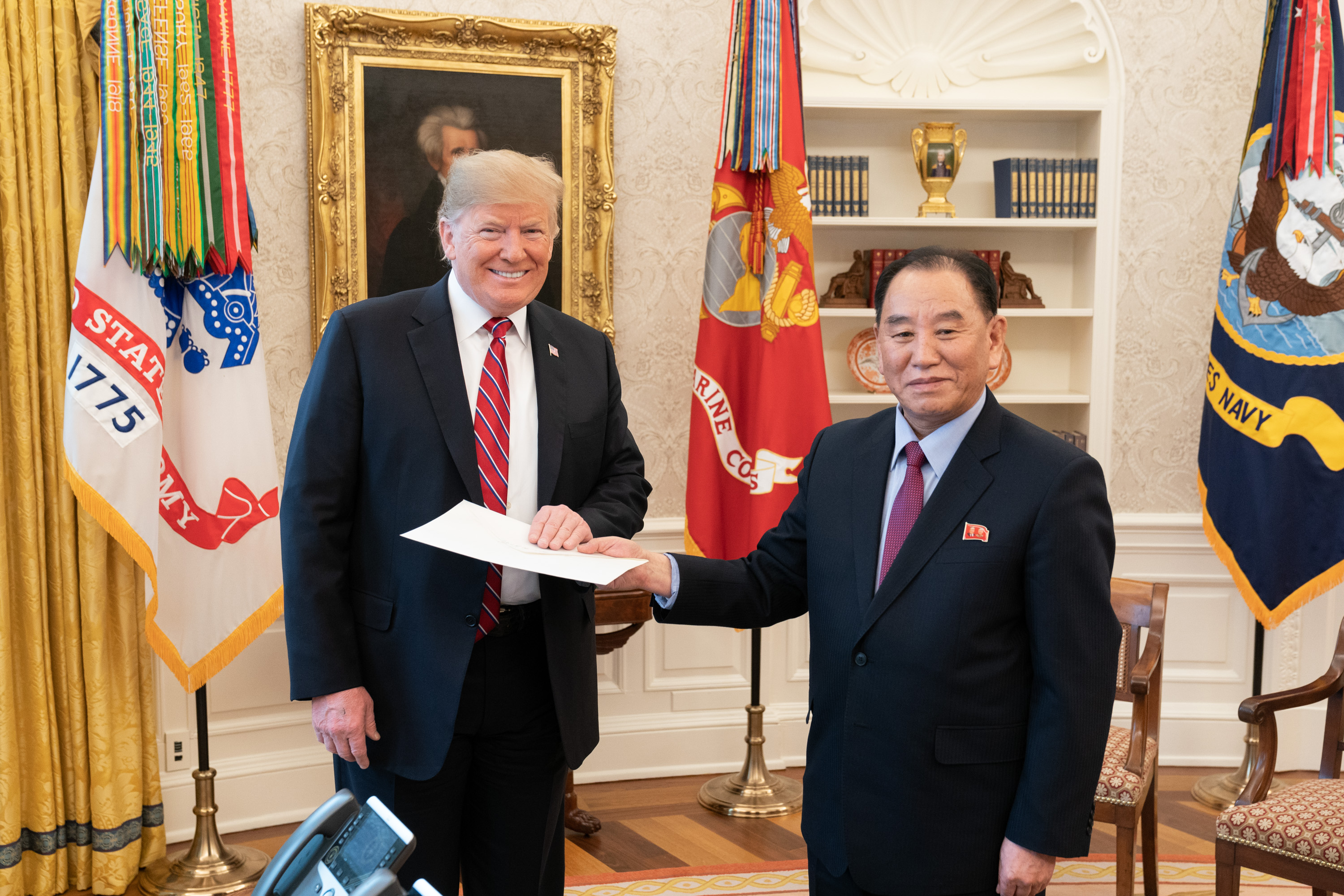
North Korea's Vice Chairman Kim Yong-chol delivers a personal letter from Kim to Trump, in the White House Oval Office on January 18, 2019

On October 7, 2018, Pompeo traveled to Pyongyang to negotiate the second summit between Trump and Kim Jong Un. He later met with Moon in Seoul to inform him of the upcoming summit.

On January 8, 2019, Kim Jong Un met with Xi to consult with him on the possibility of the Trump–Kim summit in Vietnam. On February 16, 2019, Reuters reported that Kim Jong Un would arrive in Vietnam on February 25 ahead of the summit.

=== Train journey to Vietnam ===
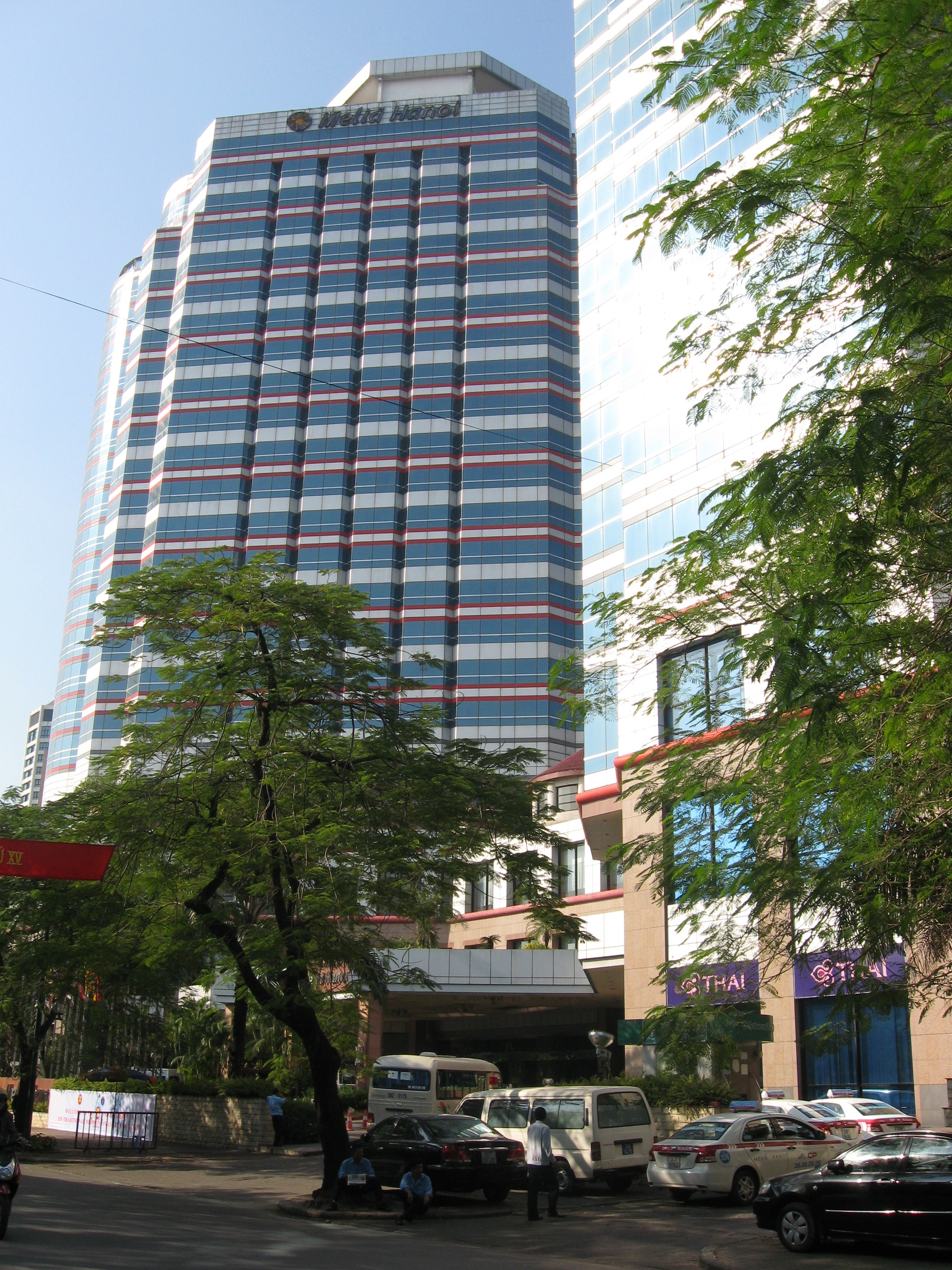
Kim Jong Un stayed in Melia Hanoi Hotel during the summit

Kim Jong Un departed from Pyongyang on February 23, 2019, according to images released by the KCNA news agency. The exact itinerary was kept secret. The train arrived in Đồng Đăng railway station of the Vietnamese border town of Đồng Đăng on February 26, and Kim Jong Un continued on to Hanoi by car.

Some experts analyzed Kim's motive for choosing to take a train instead of flying: Kim had wanted to follow Kim Il Sung, who had also traveled to Vietnam through China by railway in 1958.

== Meeting location ==
=== Locations considered ===
Bloomberg and the South Korean newspaper Munhwa Ilbo anticipated the location of the second Trump–Kim Summit to be Hanoi, due to Vietnam maintaining good diplomatic relations with both North Korea and the United States. During the 2019 State of the Union Address, Trump announced Vietnam as the host of the second meeting between the two leaders.

=== City choice ===
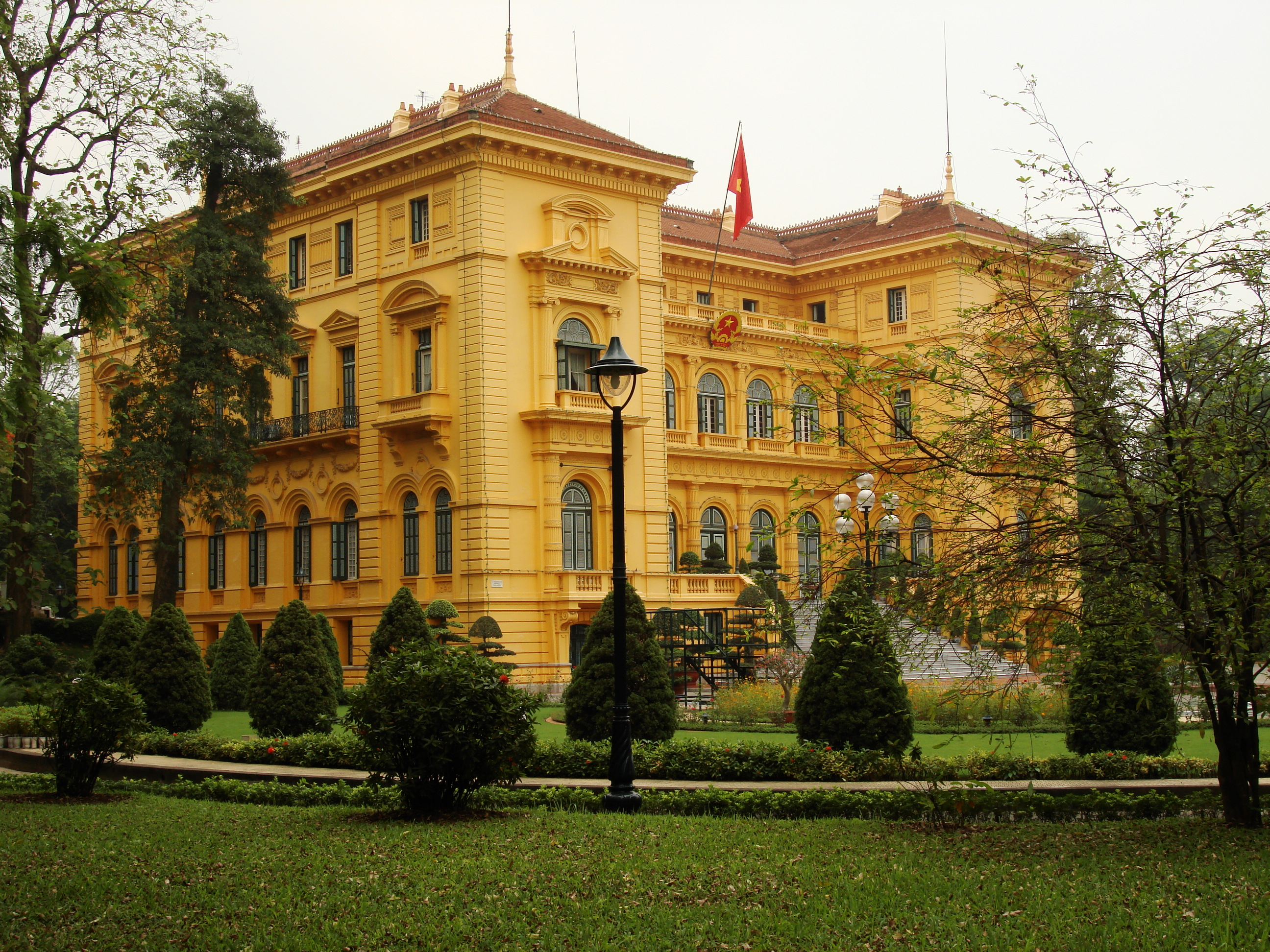
The Presidential Palace in Hanoi; the second Trump-Kim summit location was confirmed to take place in Hanoi, Vietnam

Several Vietnamese cities were considered to host the summit, which included government direct-administered cities (Hanoi, Da Nang, Ho Chi Minh City) and some other places like Hạ Long, Nha Trang, and Phú Quốc. Hanoi was determined to be the best candidate due to various reasons, such as being presented with the title "City for Peace" by the UNESCO, being the capital of Vietnam, and as such, a favourable place for Vietnamese leaders to meet North Korean and American leaders.

It was reported that when the city in Vietnam was still being discussed, the main contenders were Hanoi (favoured by North Korea because it has its embassy there) and Da Nang (favored by the United States because the 2017 APEC Vietnam summit was held there).

On February 8, 2019, Trump confirmed that Hanoi would host the summit.

=== Venue choice ===
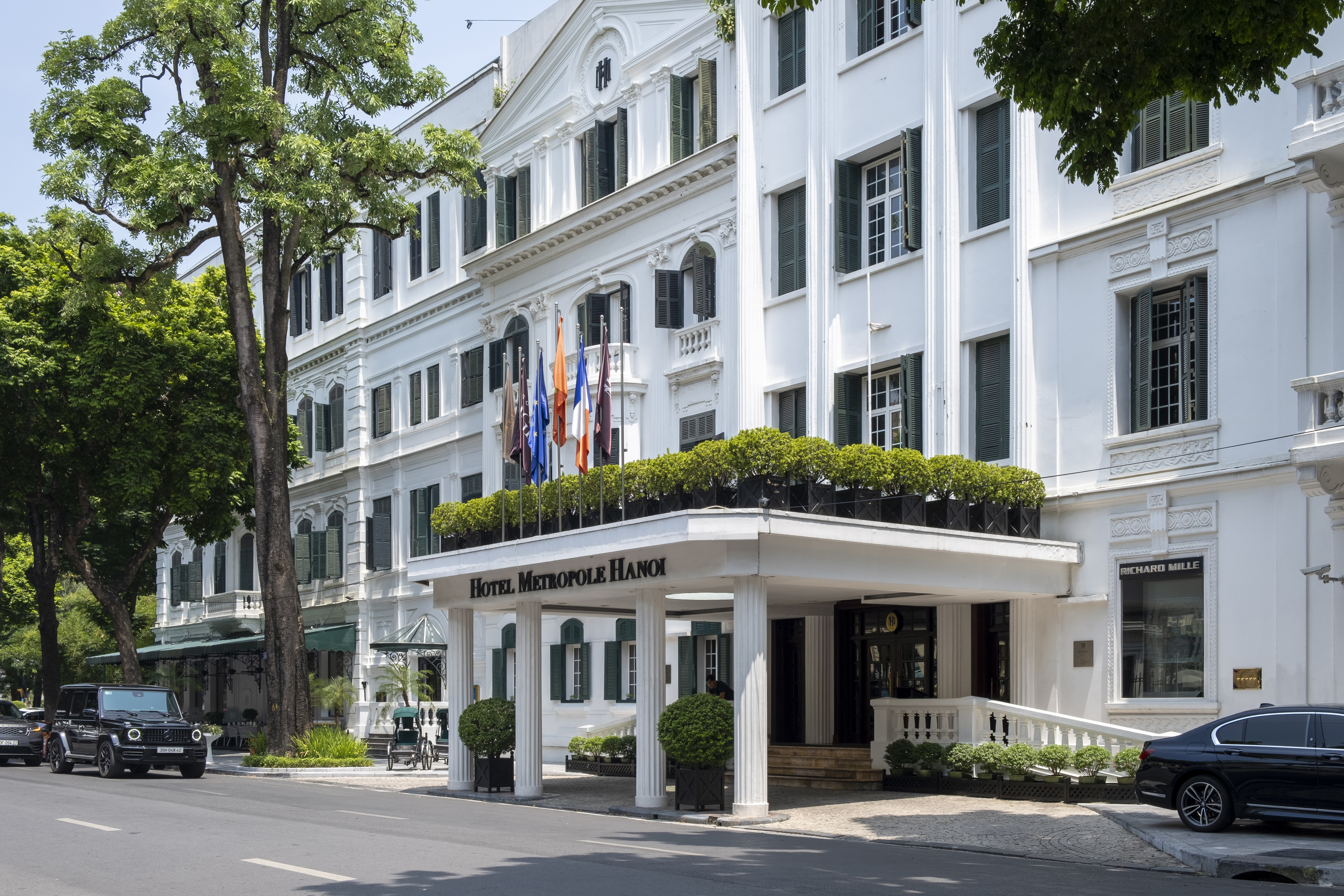
The French Colonial Hôtel Métropole was chosen as the summit venue

North Korean officials had repeatedly investigated the State Guest House and the Hôtel Métropole, Hanoi's first international hotel, the latter of which became the site for the summit.

== Summit meeting ==
=== First day ===
==== Meeting with Vietnamese leaders ====
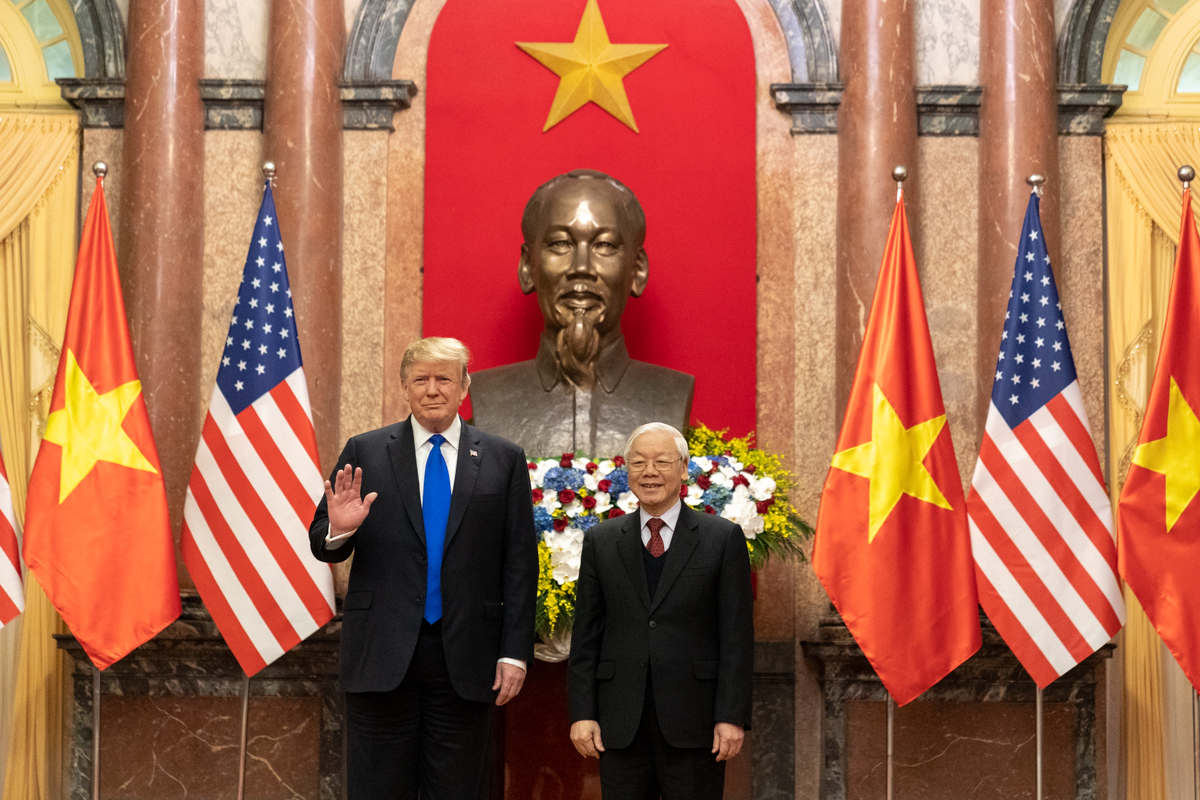
President Donald Trump and General Secretary, President of Vietnam Nguyễn Phú Trọng, February 27, 2019

Trump met General Secretary, President of Vietnam Nguyễn Phú Trọng around 11:42 am local time. They watched the Vietnamese airline executives sign a series of business deals with U.S. companies.

Trump also had a meeting with the Vietnamese prime minister Nguyễn Xuân Phúc on February 27.

==== One-on-one meeting ====
At Hanoi's Metropole Hotel, Trump and Kim Jong Un had a one-on-one meeting for 30 minutes on Wednesday evening. They started the summit at 6:30 pm local time (6:30 am EST) with a handshake and then participated in a one-on-one meeting with interpreters only.

==== Dinner ====
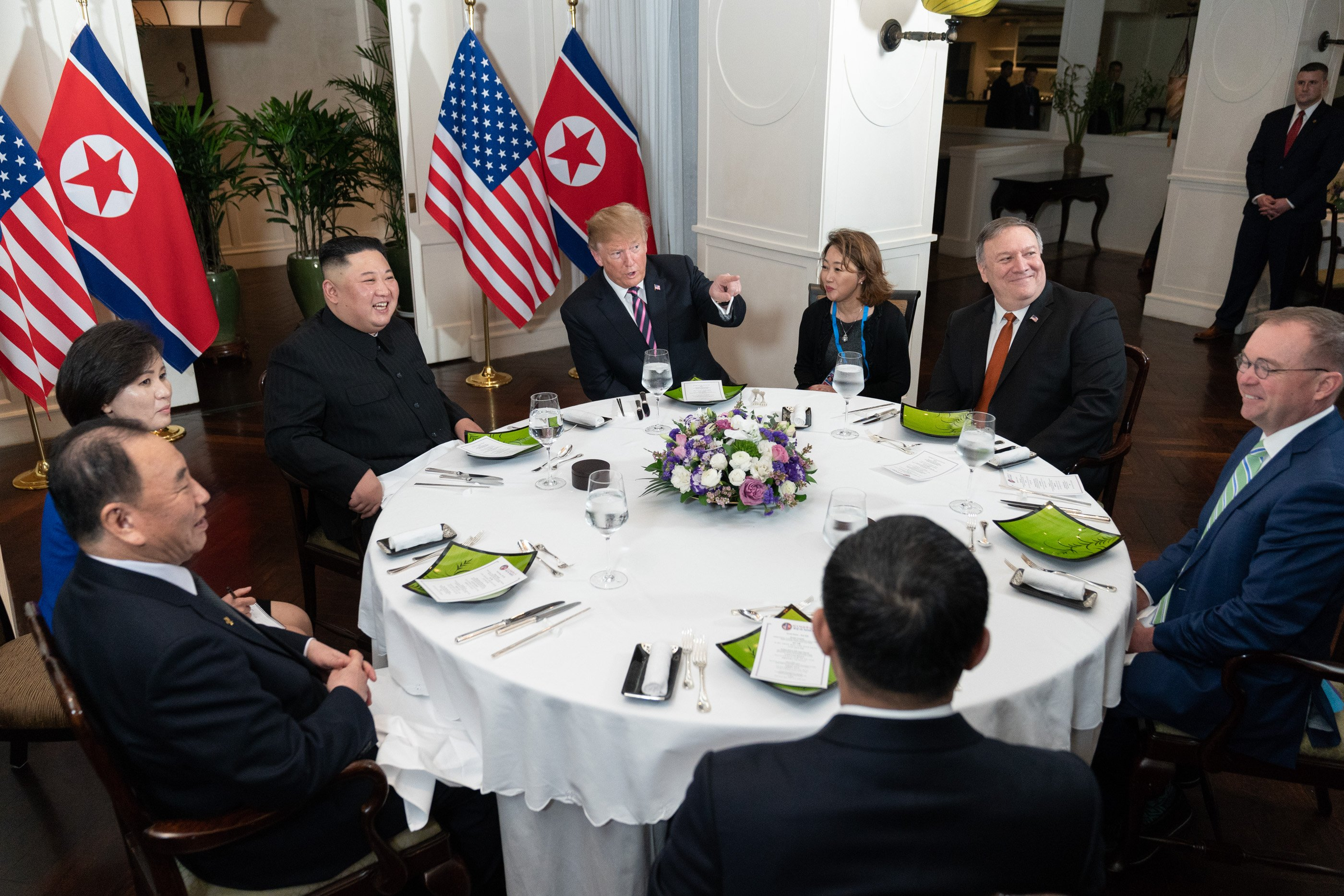
U.S. President Donald Trump and North Korean Chairman Kim Jong Un having dinner, along with their delegation

Trump and Kim started with a social dinner in Hanoi on Wednesday. There were a few key attendees at the dinner; seated at the round table were U.S. Secretary of State Mike Pompeo and acting Chief of Staff Mick Mulvaney, DPRK Vice Chairman Kim Yong-chol, and Minister of Foreign Affairs Ri Yong-ho. Trump assured North Korea a "tremendous future for your country" in his initial comments with Kim Jong Un. Kim Jong Un described the second summit as a "courageous political decision" by Trump and also added that there had been "a lot of thinking, effort, and patience" between now and the previous June summit in Singapore.

On the first night of the summit, the White House announced that Trump and Kim Jong Un would sign a "joint agreement" the next afternoon.

=== Second day ===
==== One-on-one meeting ====
During the one-on-one meeting in Hanoi, Kim Jong Un was asked by a reporter if he would consider opening a US liaison office in Pyongyang. Kim Jong Un initially hesitated to answer the question and asked Trump to excuse the press from the summit room, but Trump urged Kim Jong Un to answer the question, to which he responded through an interpreter that the idea was "welcomeable". Trump acknowledged the response as a positive one. After that, another reporter asked if Kim Jong Un was willing to shut down his nuclear program, to which he responded, "If I'm not willing to do that, I wouldn't be here right now." The leaders went into a closed-room meeting, but the planned working lunch between Trump and Kim Jong Un and the potential joint signing ceremony were canceled. After preliminary negotiations between Trump and Kim Jong Un went over a period of time, White House Press Secretary Sarah Huckabee Sanders told reporters waiting to cover the lunch that it had been called off.

One month after the summit ended, Reuters reported that on the second day of the summit, Trump passed Kim Jong Un a note that bluntly called for North Korea to surrender all its nuclear weapons and fuel, in similar fashion to the "Libya model", a proposal the North Koreans had repeatedly rejected. The scheduled ceremonial luncheon was then abruptly canceled and the summit ended.

==== End of summit ====
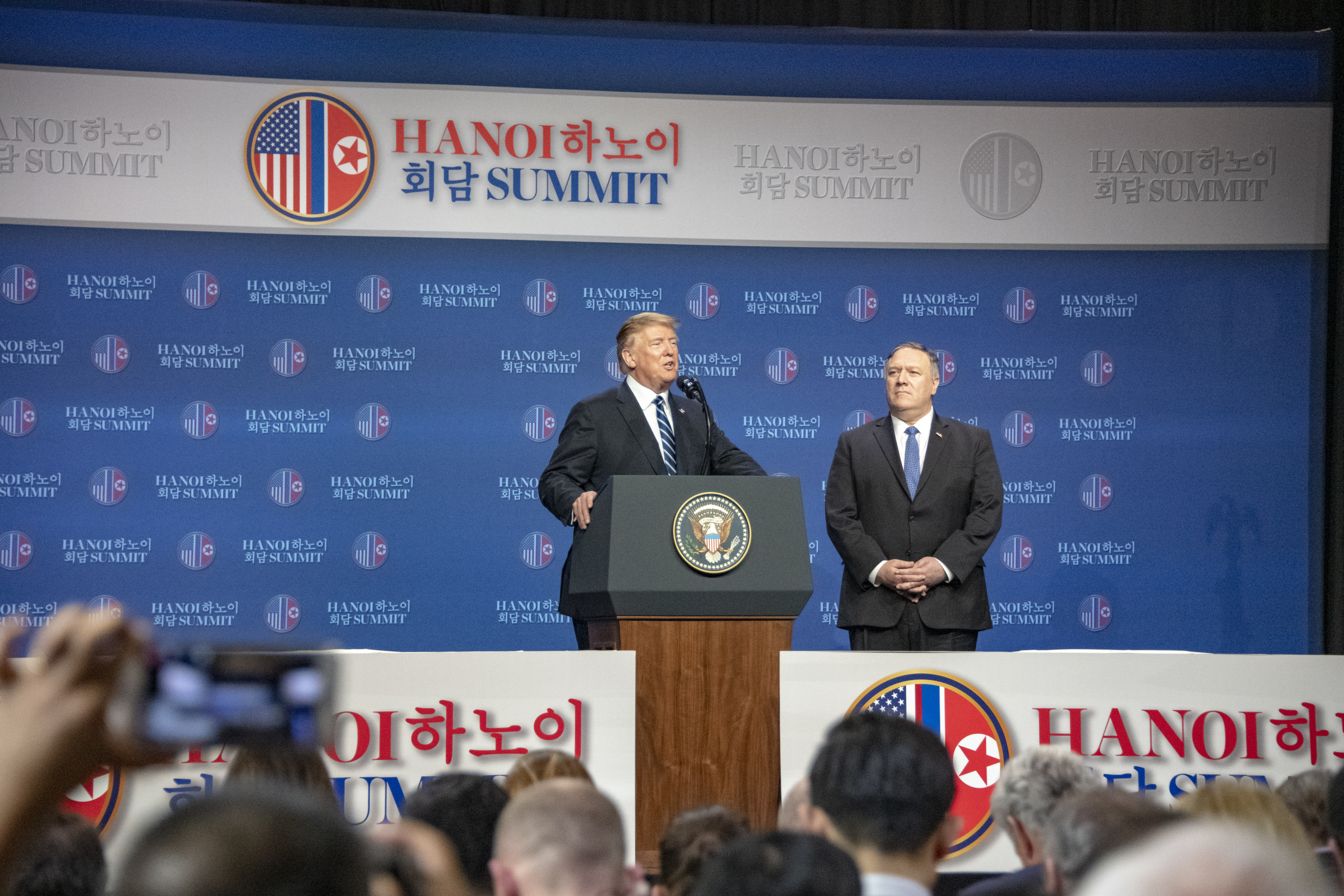
President Donald Trump and Secretary Mike Pompeo at the press conference after the summit

On February 28, 2019, the White House announced that the summit was cut short and that no agreement was reached. Sanders did not tell reporters why the schedule was changed and whether there was going to be a signing ceremony; the unexpected turn of events caused stocks on the South Korea stock exchange to fall. Trump said in a press conference after the summit that it was cut short because North Korea wanted an end to economics sanctions. He elaborated and said: "Basically, they wanted the sanctions lifted in their entirety and we couldn't do that [...] We had to walk away from that particular suggestion. We had to walk away from that."

During the press conference after the summit, Trump discussed American student Otto Warmbier, who was imprisoned for 17 months by North Korea for conviction of subversion, and who died shortly after being returned comatose to the U.S. Trump said he believed Kim Jong Un's word that he did not personally know about Warmbier's alleged poor treatment when Warmbier was in North Korean custody, and that it was not to Kim Jong Un's benefit to allow Warmbier to be treated poorly.

===== A news conference from North Korea =====
Hours later, in a rare move, North Korean officials called a news conference. Ri offered a different account of his country's position compared to Trump: North Korea had only proposed a partial lifting of sanctions. He stated that North Korea wanted 5 out of 11 sanctions originally imposed by the United Nations in 2016 and 2017 lifted; in exchange, Ri said that North Korea offered to "permanently and completely" dismantle its primary nuclear facility in Yongbyon, and that American experts would be allowed to observe. Ri also quoted North Korea as proposing to put in writing that the country would end all nuclear tests and long-range missile tests. He said that the North Koreans saw that no agreement could be made after the United States demanded one further measure in addition to destroying the Yongbyon nuclear facility. Lastly, Ri concluded that North Korea's proposal would not be changed. According to NK News, Vice Foreign Minister Choe Son-hui made the proposal to dismantle Yongbyon just before the talks collapsed, but the U.S. team walked out when Choe was unable to give details.

==== News report ====
NBC News reported that American negotiators had dropped their demand that North Korea provide a detailed inventory of its nuclear and missile programs on the second day of the summit. Nuclear scientist Dr. Siegfried Hecker claimed: "Yongbyon is the heart of North Korea's nuclear program, and if we are completely dismantling the Yongbyon nuclear facility, North Korea would never be able to make plutonium there again."

== Reactions and analysis ==
=== Pre-summit ===
Cheong Seong-chang, vice president of research planning at the Sejong Institute in South Korea, said: "After the first Trump–Kim summit, for 260 days, they did not waste their timeliness. Instead, they continuously finalized their negotiation strategies for the two leaders' agreement and terms for the next step to be discussed on the second Trump–Kim summit."

BBC News believed that Kim Jong Un could have potentially learned from Vietnam's social, political and economic history during the second Trump-Kim summit. While the country has strict rules against political liberalization, it is fairly lax in its social, religious, and economic guidelines. Citizens were able to travel to neighboring countries often. Vietnam also pursued multi-front foreign policies so they would not be dependent on just one economy and built modern systems for banking and finance. According to the BBC, North Korea also learned from Vietnam's mistakes in the past regarding natural resources management and political unrest resolution. The BBC believed these are some cases North Korea could learn from Vietnam's practice to help them in improving their economy by attracting foreign investors and developing closer relations with other countries. It was also assumed by the BBC that Vietnam's economic reform is a better pattern for the DPRK to follow than China's.

Al Jazeera assumed that the impact of China on the second Trump–Kim summit would be significant. The relationship between China and North Korea is centered on "mutual benefit", but it differs from "mutual trust". Australian professor Carlyle Thayer claimed China and North Korea are of the corresponding inclination after Kim Jong Un's four visits to China and "it indicates some kind of coordination". China believes that it is impossible for North Korea to abruptly destroy nuclear missiles. However, it is hoped that North Korea's nuclear missile program will be shut down gradually, as economic sanctions against North Korea will be eased.

Andrew Kim, former head of the CIA's Korea Mission Center, believes in Kim Jong Un's genuine desire to achieve denuclearization and get a concession from the United States. In a speech Andrew Kim made on February 22 at Stanford University, he said that Kim Jong Un told United States Secretary of State Mike Pompeo "[that] he is a father and husband and he does not want his children to live their lives carrying nuclear weapons on their back". He also believes that the DPRK tried to strike a deal with previous administrations, but they waited too long, and they aim to finalize the deal with the Trump administration before it's too late. Kim Jong Un assessed that the closure of the Yongbyon nuclear facility would be the beginning of full denuclearization and that this could lead to a peace treaty. The Yongbyon facility is known to be the center of nuclear development and research in North Korea.

The Sydney Morning Herald reported that Kim Jong Un's previous propaganda was changed into patriotism and economy, and in improving the relationship between the United States, China, and South Korea.

=== Post-summit ===
==== South Korea and Japan ====
South Korea and Japan both supported Trump's decision to cut the summit short. However, a spokesman for Moon said "We do regret that President Trump and Kim Jong-un did not reach a complete agreement at today's summit," but also that the summit "made more meaningful progress than any other time in the past".

===== South Korea =====
Jung Da-min, staff reporter at The Korea Times, believed that the Hanoi summit was not a total loss since it still resulted in diplomacy between the two countries. Though no concrete agreement regarding denuclearization was reached, Kim Jong Un was quoted last Tuesday (March 5) that he was committed to the complete denuclearization of his country. However, the description of denuclearization seemed to differ between the U.S. and North Korea, which was why Biegun advised that the U.S. would not accept a "phased denuclearization". Even though no agreement was signed in Hanoi, both countries are open to future talks, which shows that some agreement was made regarding few agendas, like the installation of a liaison office in Pyongyang.

Hwang Jihwan, a professor in the Department of International Relations at the University of Seoul, believed the no-deal outcome of the Hanoi summit was because both parties asked for more than what each could give. He believed that no deal is better than a bad deal, and suggested that the two leaders should aim for realistic goals in future summits; asking for huge deals from each other would not yield favorable results for both sides, but working on smaller, workable agreements that would be meritorious for both countries was better than leaving the negotiation table empty-handed.

The Chosun Ilbo reported on May 30, 2019, that Kim Hyok-chol, the lead working-level negotiator for North Korea at the Hanoi summit, was executed along with four other diplomats in March 2019. It also reported that Kim Yong-chol was sentenced to hard labor. However, several photos were later released on June 3, 2019, showing Kim Yong-chol alive and attending a musical performance alongside Kim Jong Un and Ri Sol-ju.

==== United States ====
A Monmouth University poll found that while 65% of those surveyed—including 42% of Democrats—agreed that holding the summit was a good idea, 44% said it was likely to help reduce the North Korean nuclear threat.

Former special assistant to U.S. President Ronald Reagan and a senior fellow at the Cato Institute, Doug Bandow, compared North Korea and U.S. relations to that of Reagan and Mikhail Gorbachev, where the agreement resulted in the end of the Cold War. Bandow contended that Trump was demanding unrealistically for Kim Jong Un to dismantle all his nuclear facilities, whereas Kim was only agreeing to shut down the Nyongbyon Nuclear facility in exchange for a partial lifting of a few UN sanctions against his country. Asking continuously for an all nukes for sanctions deal is deemed as malicious in its intent and illogical and that it would put a strain on U.S.–North Korean relationships, which were volatile in the past, and could result in more problems for the U.S. and its allies in Asia, according to Bandow.

Douglas Dillon, Professor of Government at the Harvard Kennedy School, and former director of Harvard's Belfer Center, Graham T. Allison, believed that the Hanoi summit was not a complete failure, and compared the state of affairs to the Reagan–Gorbachev era. Like Trump, Reagan also had to deal with negative public opinion regarding his dealings with the USSR, but he was able to remove all of the Soviet Union's intermediate nuclear-armed missiles with an INF deal. Compared to the USSR, North Korea is also not a normalized country, but Trump was able to directly engage with Kim Jong Un, something George W. Bush and Barack Obama were not able to do in their combined 16-year term.

U.S. Senior Expert on North Korea, Frank Aum, said that future goals of the Trump administration should be the founding of smaller deals that resulted from the Hanoi summit. Deals that include the declaration of the end of the Korean War, the exchange of liaison offices in both Pyongyang and Washington, some sanctions relief, and verified dismantling of some of North Korea's nuclear facilities (Nyngbyon, Punggye-ri, and Dongchang-ri) are attainable. According to Aum, Trump's "Big Deal" approach to North Korea would have been unrealistic, since it is not possible to achieve complete denuclearization in two years. He also said that some of the road-maps to establishing complete denuclearization might be the most hopeful solution.

A political scientist specializing in international security, Christopher J. Watterson, argued in The Diplomat that "North Korea's willingness to give up fissile material production in Nyongbyon might reflect an intent to shift operations to Kangson, rather than an intent to cease fissile material production altogether".

Reuters revealed the existence of a document handed to Kim Jong Un by Trump that may have caused the collapse of the Hanoi summit. The document and its contents were first proposed by Bolton in 2004 and—according to Washington-based expert on North Korea, Jenny Town—has been rejected more than once and "... to bring it up again ... would rather be insulting." She also said that the U.S. should have learned that this was not effective diplomacy, and shows they have not learned how to properly negotiate with North Korea.

Abby Bard, a research associate for Asia policy at the Center for American Progress, suggested Trump and Kim Jong Un's teams need critical space between them to build trust and verify the intentions between the two parties. Without regular communication from both sides, it would be impossible to reach an agreement as they are both skeptical of one another's intent. Biegun did not meet with his North Korean counterpart before the summit took place, which resulted in the meeting not having enough support for negotiations.

Despite the collapse of the Hanoi summit, Katharine Moon, professor of political sciences and the Wasserman Chair of Asian Studies at Wellesley College, said that there were good things that came out of it: it opened doors for further negotiations in the future, and these talks require working-level counterparts that aim to pursue respective and mutual interests between the two countries to breakthrough their engagement.

House Speaker Nancy Pelosi said that she was glad Trump walked away from the second summit without a joint agreement. She emphasized that "What [the U.S. wants] is the denuclearization of North Korea," and she also believes that although North Korea wanted the sanctions lifted, but refused to give up all their nuclear weapons, it was right that Trump decided not to sign any deal.

Se Young Jang, a fellow at the Stanton Nuclear Security at MIT's Security Studies Program, said timing was crucial compared to the previous Clinton Administration's Agreed Framework with North Korea that failed to proceed. Trump and Kim Jong Un both revealed details of the summit, which left very little room for flexible compromises for future negotiations.

Pompeo said in an interview with CBS on April 5 that he believed that the summit was an opportunity for both the U.S. and North Korea to have a deeper understanding of each other, and hoped that a third Trump–Kim summit would happen in the near future. He also believed that South Korea is helping with the denuclearization efforts, and he understands that many North and South Koreans have the same blood and they are family.

==== Malaysia ====
Dr. Chiew-Ping Hoo, a professor at the National University of Malaysia, said that the negotiations at the Hanoi summit changed when Bolton was added to the panel. He advised to broaden focus from the Yongbyon nuclear site, and add other sites that produced weapons of mass destruction. Trump had agreed with Bolton's advice due to U.S. domestic issues, which resulted in a no-deal outcome for the summit. Hoo also believed that North Korea is not convinced that changing the deal is the right course, but to return to the pre-Hanoi agreement details.

Moon was ready to meet with Kim Jong Un for a fourth time to try and save the stalled denuclearization deals between the U.S. and North Korea; however, Kim Jong Un asked Moon to support a common goal to unite North and South Korea instead of supporting the United States. In previous talks, both leaders agreed to reconnect the railways and roads that run through both their countries, normalize a factory park in the Kaesong Industrial Zone, and allow South Korean tourists to visit the Mount Kumgang resort again. However, this joint project required the partial relief of U.N. sanctions to begin operations. Moon also planned to invite Kim Jong Un to the ASEAN Summit in South Korea in November 2019.

Despite the unresolved Hanoi deal, Trump was optimistic that a denuclearization deal could still be achieved from North Korea. Kim Jong Un said that "[North Korea] maintain[s] good relations with the U.S. president, as to be able to exchange letters asking about health anytime if we want", but Kim wanted the U.S. to come to the table with a constructive attitude for the nuclear deal.

Joseph Yun, the American Special Representative for North Korea Policy until March 2018, said of the summit's outcome: "This really speaks to the lack of preparation. You cannot draft a joint statement out of nothing. They never quite got around to building a consensus around sanctions, and that led to the deadlock."

Veteran diplomacy and national security journalist Michael Gordon reported in The Wall Street Journal: "If the two sides had opted for the traditional bottom-up approach to diplomacy, their diplomats would have worked to close the divide and only arranged for a summit when they appeared to be within striking distance of an agreement. However, U.S. and North Korean diplomats have had only intermittent meetings since the June summit, and both sides bet they would be more successful by pressing their case at another summit. Mr. Kim calculated that Mr. Trump would be more flexible in agreeing to lift sanctions than his subordinates. Mr. Trump, for his part, assumed that he was the best person to pursue the art of the nuclear deal."

Richard Haass, president of the Council on Foreign Relations think tank, stated, "No deal is better than a bad deal, and the president was right to walk. But this should not have happened. A busted summit is the risk you run when too much faith is placed in personal relations with a leader like Kim, when the summit is inadequately prepared, and when the president had signaled he was confident of success."

Trump was poorly received for his stance on the Warmbier incident. His supportive remarks for Kim Jong Un in his speeches while negotiating denuclearization were not received well by the Warmbier family, who were grateful to him after their son's return. Trump said that the Warmbier case is a "delicate balance", since he was trying to establish a big denuclearization deal with Kim Jong Un, but he sympathizes for the Warmbier family at the same time. In the speech he gave to the Conservative Political Action Conference, he mentioned that there were positive developments in negotiating the return of American prisoners in North Korea, and the remains of soldiers killed in the Korean War. His relationship's improvement with Kim Jong Un was beneficial to the U.S.'s national interest.

==== China and Russia ====
A meeting between Kim Jong Un and Russian President Vladimir Putin was held from April 25 to 26, 2019. Biegun was scheduled to visit Russia that month to discuss the full denuclearization of North Korea. Putin believed that Kim Jong Un needed international security guarantees to give up North Korea's nuclear arsenal and program.

=== Plans for another summit ===
On June 12, 2019, Trump received a letter from Kim Jong Un which he described as "beautiful". On June 22, an undated photo was also released by the North Korean government of Kim Jong Un reading a letter from Trump; Kim Jong Un described the letter as "excellent" and described Trump as the "supreme leader" of the United States. On June 26, it was announced that talks were underway to hold a third US-North Korean summit. Trump previously tweeted in April 2019 that a third summit "would be good". Kim Jong Un later denied reports of continued talks with the U.S., and relations with the US State Department remained hostile.

== June 2019 DMZ Summit ==
On June 30, 2019, Kim Jong Un met with Trump at the Korean Demilitarized Zone, with Trump being the first US president to cross the border into North Korea. Kim Jong Un and Trump joined Moon for an unprecedented three-way gathering. Kim Jong Un and Trump agreed to restart negotiations for the Korean denuclearization process, but no further progress was made.

== Satellite imagery of Sohae Launching Station ==
Days after the summit ended, commercial satellite imagery indicated that reconstruction of the Sohae Satellite Launching Station, which previously appeared to be in the middle of dismantling by North Korea, may have been performed during the summit, and that the site could be operational. A senior U.S. State Department official acknowledged "some level of reassembly" but stopped short of concluding the site was operational. Town remarked: "Given how much has been done at this site, it looks like more than a couple days' worth of activity ... It's hard to say if it happened immediately after the summit and they just rushed everything — I guess it's possible — but it's more likely that it started just before." South Korean National Intelligence Service chief Suh Hoon said there was recent transport vehicle activity at the Sanumdong ICBM factory. Some analysts believed that the renewed activity at Sohae and Sanumdong was designed to pressure Washington back to the negotiating table, rather than to actually restart the nuclear testing program.

== See also ==
- 2018–19 Korean peace process
- Korean reunification
- North Korea–United States relations
  - Agreed Framework
  - 2018 North Korea–United States Singapore Summit (the first Trump–Kim summit)
- Peace Treaty on Korean Peninsula
- North Korea and weapons of mass destruction
- Nuclear power in North Korea
- List of nuclear weapons tests of North Korea
- 2017–18 North Korea crisis
- 2017 North Korean missile tests
- April 2018 inter-Korean summit
- May 2018 inter-Korean summit
- September 2018 inter-Korean summit
- Kim–Xi meetings, unofficial North Korea–China summit
- Kim–Putin meetings, unofficial North Korea–Russia summit
- List of international trips made by Kim Jong Un
- Inter-Korean Liaison Office bombing
