= Jung H. Pak =

American historian and diplomat

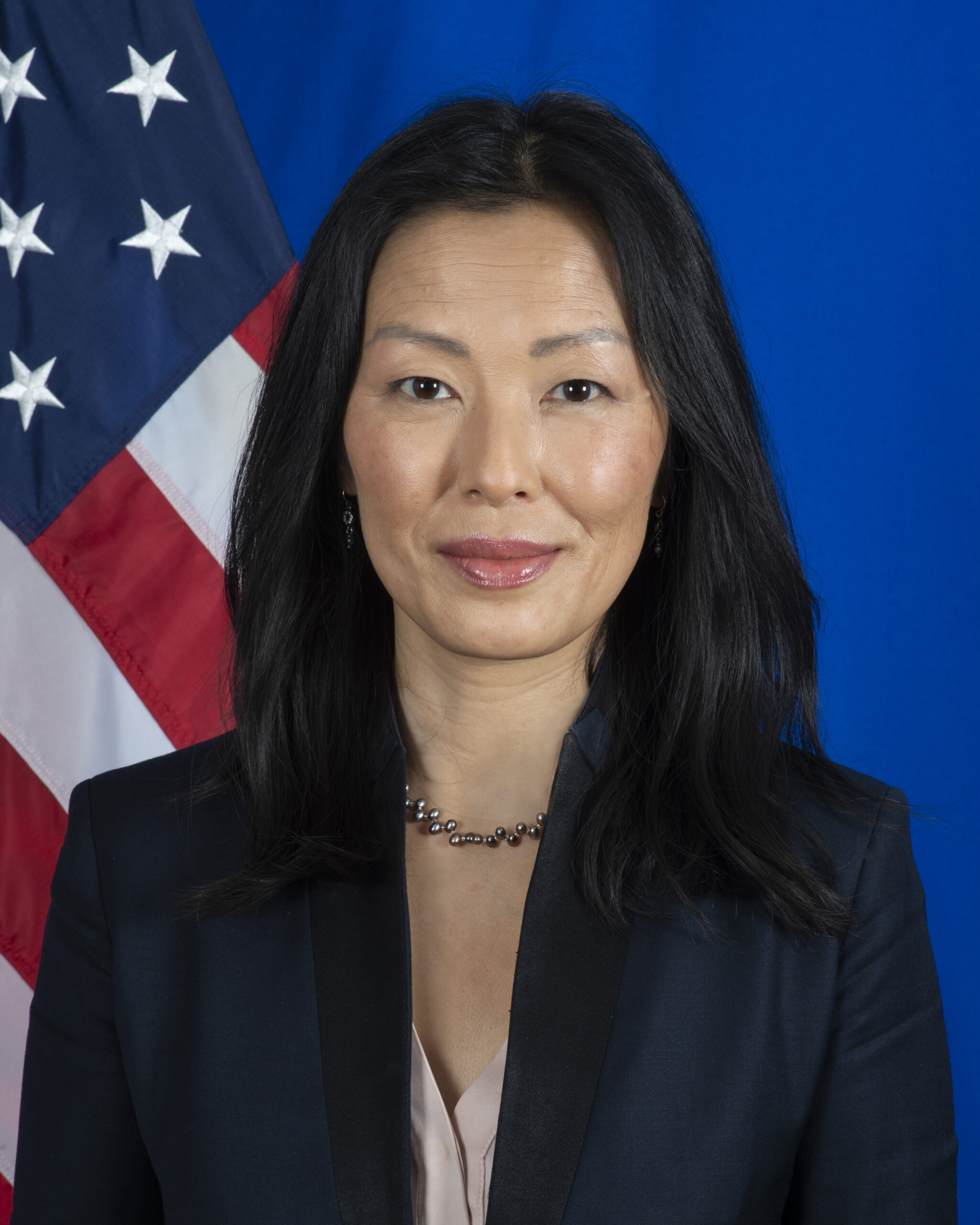

United States Senior Official for North Korea
- In office November 21, 2023 – July 5, 2024
- President: Joe Biden
- Preceded by: Sung Y. Kim

Deputy Assistant Secretary of East Asian and Pacific Affairs
- In office January 20, 2021 – July 12, 2024
- President: Joe Biden

Personal details
- Education: Colgate University (BA), Columbia University (PhD)
- Occupation: Historian, diplomat

Jung H. Pak is an American historian and diplomat. She served as United States Special Representative for North Korea in the Biden administration from 2023 to 2024.

== Early life and education ==
Pak holds a PhD in U.S. history from Columbia University and a BA in history (magna cum laude) from Colgate University, where she was also awarded an honorary doctorate and served on the board of trustees.

== Career ==
Pak taught at Hunter College in New York from 2006 to 2008. While there, she helped launch the Roosevelt House Public Policy Institute. Pak previously was a SK-Korea Foundation Chair in Korea Studies and Senior Fellow at the Brookings Institution's Center for East Asia Policy Studies. Prior to that, she was a Portfolio Manager for the East Asia & Pacific Mission Center at the Central Intelligence Agency.

== Publications ==
- Becoming Kim Jong Un: A Former CIA Officer's Insights Into North Korea's Enigmatic Young Dictator, Ballantine Books, April 28, 2020

Diplomatic posts
Preceded by Sung Y. Kim	United States Senior Official for the DPRK; 2023–2024	Vacant
