= Sung Y. Kim =

South Korean-born American diplomat (born 1960)

Sung Kim
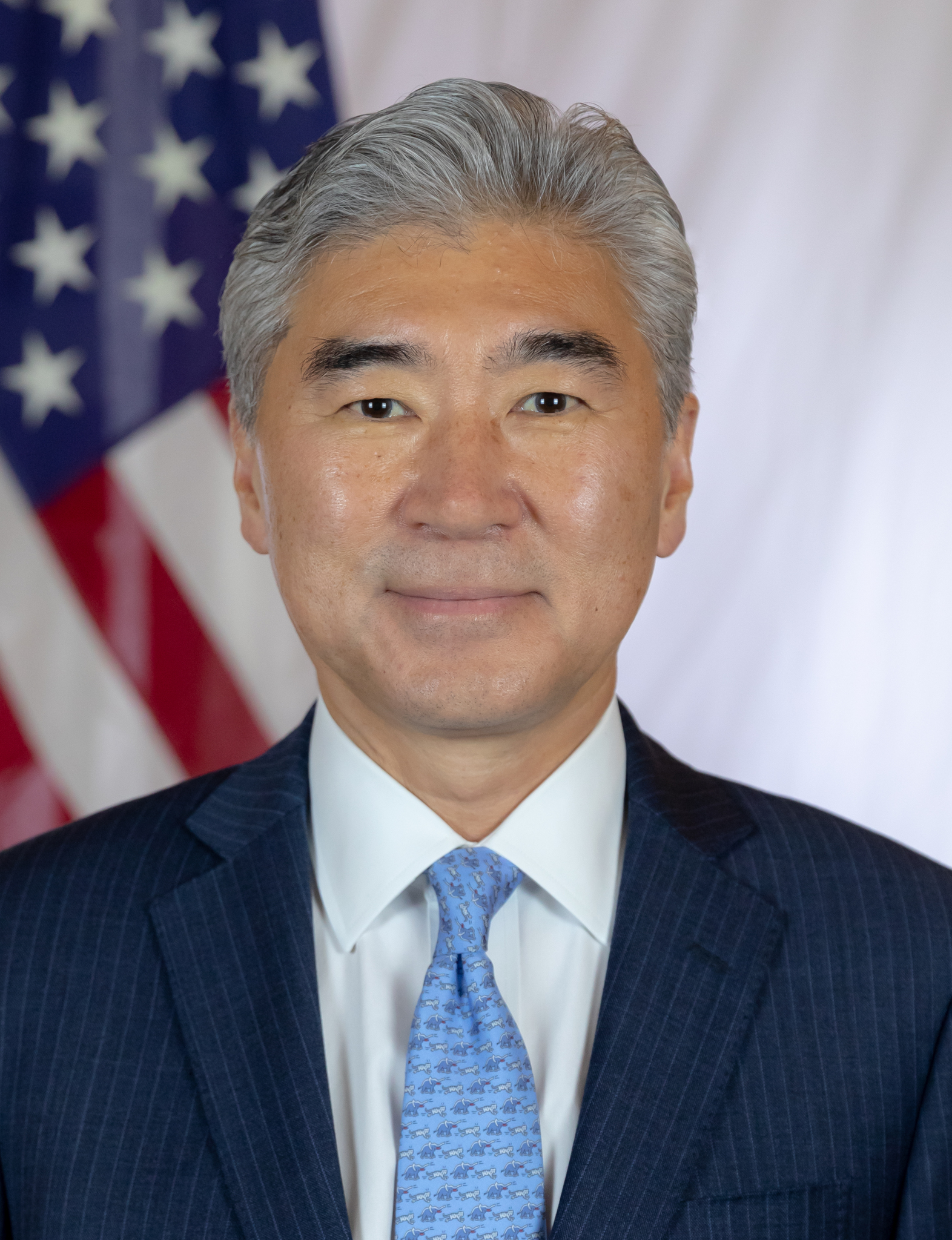
- Kim in 2020

United States Ambassador to Indonesia
- In office October 21, 2020 – November 21, 2023
- President: Donald Trump; Joe Biden
- Preceded by: Joseph R. Donovan Jr.
- Succeeded by: Kamala Shirin Lakhdhir

United States Special Envoy for North Korea
- In office May 21, 2021 – November 21, 2023
- President: Joe Biden
- Preceded by: Stephen Biegun
- Succeeded by: Jung H. Pak
- In office November 6, 2014 – November 3, 2016
- President: Barack Obama
- Preceded by: Glyn T. Davies
- Succeeded by: Joseph Y. Yun

Assistant Secretary of State for East Asian and Pacific Affairs
- Acting
- In office January 20, 2021 – June 4, 2021
- President: Joe Biden
- Preceded by: David R. Stilwell
- Succeeded by: Daniel Kritenbrink

United States Ambassador to the Philippines
- In office December 6, 2016 – October 4, 2020
- President: Barack Obama; Donald Trump
- Preceded by: Philip Goldberg
- Succeeded by: John C. Law (Chargé d'Affaires); MaryKay Carlson

United States Ambassador to South Korea
- In office November 25, 2011 – October 24, 2014
- President: Barack Obama
- Preceded by: Kathleen Stephens
- Succeeded by: Mark Lippert

United States Special Envoy for the Six-Party Talks
- In office July 31, 2008 – October 13, 2011
- President: George W. Bush; Barack Obama
- Preceded by: Christopher R. Hill
- Succeeded by: Clifford Hart

Personal details
- Born: Kim Sung Yong; 1960 (age 65–66) Seoul, South Korea
- Spouse: Jae Eun Chung
- Children: 2
- Education: University of Pennsylvania (BA); Loyola Marymount University (JD); London School of Economics (LLM)

Korean name
- Hangul: 김성용
- Hanja: 金星容
- RR: Gim Seongyong
- MR: Kim Sŏngyong

Sung Yong Kim (Korean: 김성용; born 1960) is an American business advisor and retired diplomat of Korean descent who served as the United States Special Representative for North Korea Policy from 2014 to 2016, and again from 2021 to 2023. He also served as the acting Assistant Secretary of State for East Asian and Pacific Affairs from January to June 2021.

In 2008, Kim was appointed by President George W. Bush as the U.S. Special Envoy for the six-party talks. He later served in the Obama and first Trump administrations as the Ambassador to South Korea from 2011 to 2014 and as the Ambassador to the Philippines from 2016 to 2020. In 2020, Kim was appointed by President Donald Trump as Ambassador to Indonesia. He later reprised his role as special envoy to North Korea in the Biden administration.

== Early life and education ==
Sung Kim was born in Seoul, South Korea, in 1960 to a South Korean diplomat and moved to the United States in 1973 following his father's posting in Tokyo. Kim later grew up in Los Angeles and graduated from the University of Pennsylvania (BA, 1982), Loyola Law School of the Loyola Marymount University (JD, 1985), and the London School of Economics (LL.M). He also holds an honorary degree from the Catholic University of Korea.

== Professional career ==
Before joining the United States Foreign Service at the State Department, Kim worked as public prosecutor at the Los Angeles County District Attorney's office.

He then worked as Staff Assistant in the Bureau of East Asian and Pacific Affairs in Washington, D.C. Kim was then assigned to United States Embassy in Seoul and worked as the Chief of Political Military Affairs. He then served as a Political Officer in Tokyo, Japan. His other assignments were to Kuala Lumpur and Hong Kong. Back in Washington, he was appointed Director of the Office of Korean Affairs and served in the position from August 2006 to July 2008. On July 31, 2008, he was appointed Special Envoy for the Six-Party talks and accorded the rank of an ambassador after confirmation of nomination by the U.S. Senate.

== United States Ambassadorship ==
=== Ambassador to South Korea ===
On June 24, 2011, President Obama nominated Kim to be the U.S. Ambassador to the Republic of Korea. However, Kim's nomination stalled after U.S. Senator Jon Kyl placed a hold on Kim's nomination over concerns not with Kim but with U.S. policy toward North Korea. On October 13, 2011, Kyl lifted his hold on Kim's nomination and the Senate confirmed Kim by unanimous consent.

Kim completed his assignment to South Korea in late October 2014 and returned to the United States, where he was expected to continue to work on diplomacy involving East Asia. Mark Lippert was sworn in to succeed Kim as ambassador on October 24, 2014, in Washington, D.C.

In May 2014, near the end of his tenure, Kim was honored by the Asia Society for his service in Korea. Jonathan Karp, executive director of Asia Society, said Kim has done a lot to advance relations between the U.S. and Korea as a representative of the Obama administration. He was also named an honorary citizen of Seoul by Seoul Mayor Park Won-soon who said to Kim "Time flies so quickly. I must say I'm sad you have to return to your country... Even after you leave Korea for your next post, I ask of you that, as an honorary citizen of Seoul, you continue to have special interests in and affection for the city of Seoul and for Korea." In response, Kim said "It is after all my city of birth and the place I have always considered to be my second home."

=== Ambassador to the Philippines ===
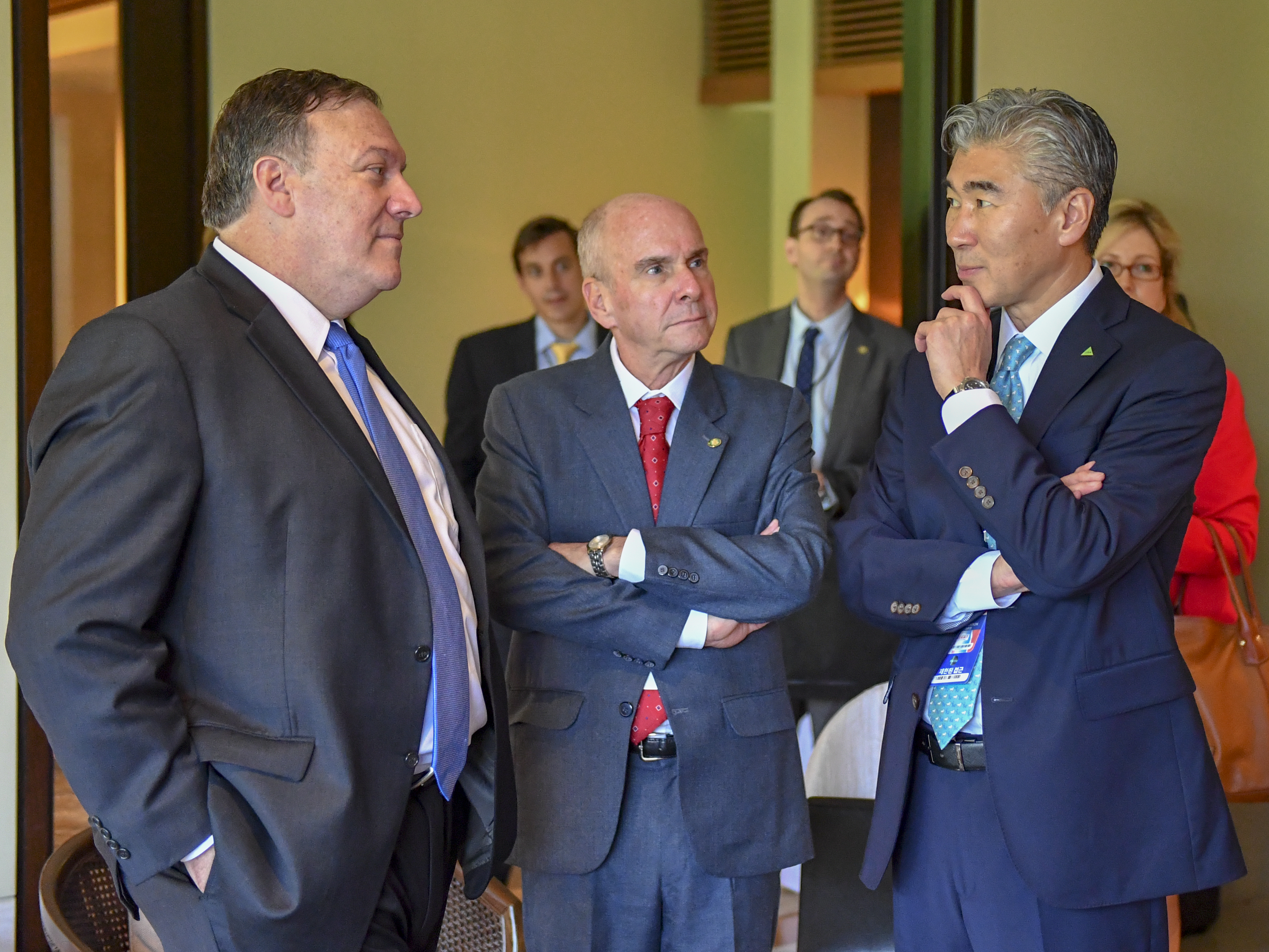
Kim (right) speaks with U.S. Secretary of State Mike Pompeo in 2018 at the Singapore Summit.

On May 19, 2016, U.S. President Obama nominated Kim to replace Philip Goldberg as the U.S. Ambassador to the Philippines. He was confirmed by the U.S. Senate on September 28, 2016, and was sworn in by Secretary of State John Kerry at the Department of State on Thursday, November 3, 2016. Kim arrived in Manila on December 3, a month after he was sworn in, and presented his credentials to Philippine President Rodrigo Duterte on December 6.

Kim, while Ambassador to the Philippines, led a delegation of American diplomats to hold talks with North Korean officials in Panmunjom in late May 2018. These talks were in regards to the upcoming summit between President Donald Trump and Kim Jong-un.

=== Ambassador to Indonesia ===
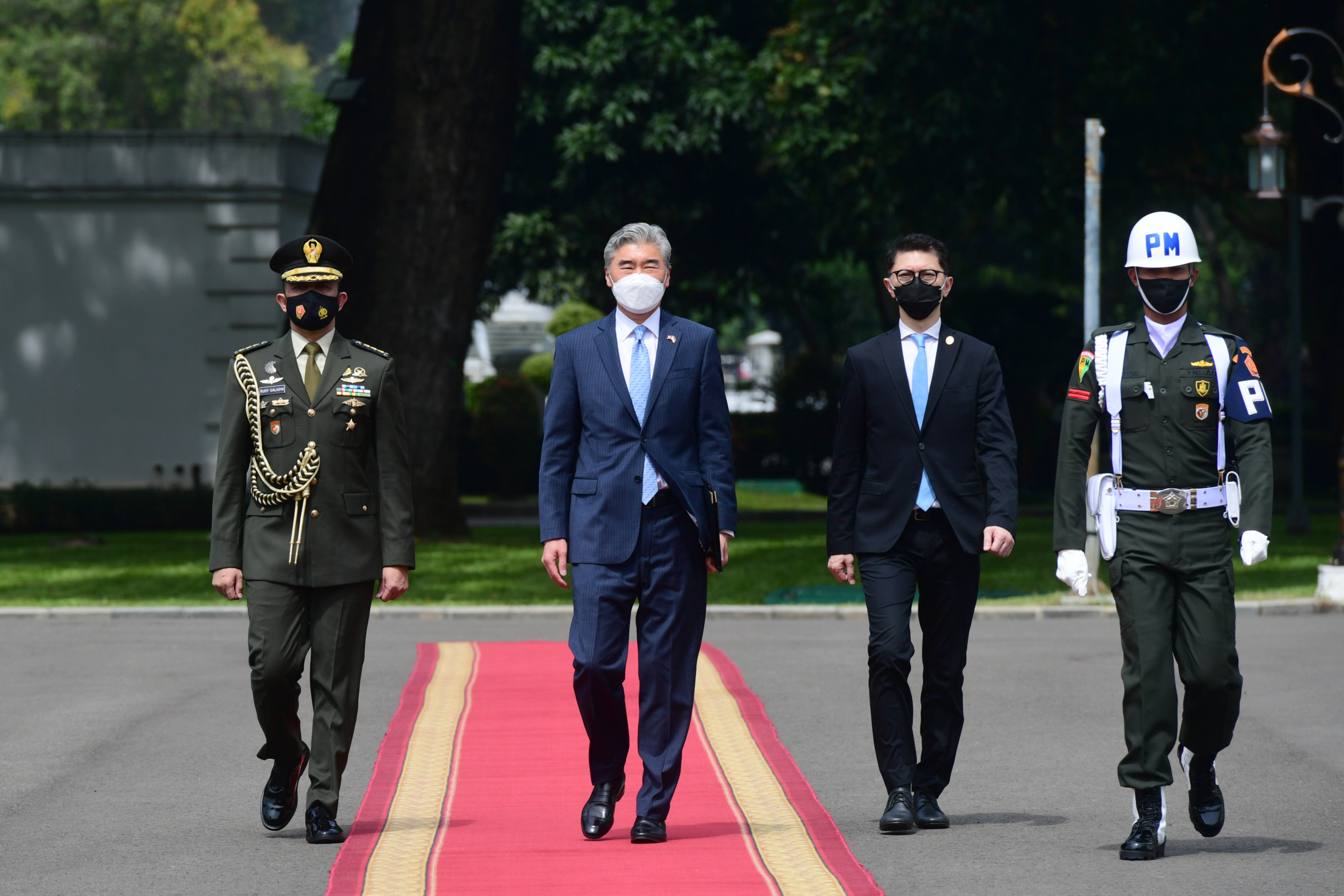
Sung Kim accompanied by Indonesia's president aide-de-camp Rudy Saladin and protocol director Akio Alfiano Tamala at the Presidential Palace

On July 10, 2019, the White House announced that he would be appointed to be Ambassador to Indonesia. On August 6, 2020, his nomination was confirmed by voice vote. He was appointed on August 31, 2020 and assumed office in October 2020.

=== U.S. special envoy for North Korea ===
President Joe Biden announced on May 21, 2021, that he would serve as the U.S. special envoy for North Korea. Kim retired in December 2023 to serve as an adviser for South Korean automaker Hyundai.

=== Foreign honors ===
- Philippines: Grand Cross (Datu) of the Order of Sikatuna (GrCS) (8 September 2020)
- Order of the Rising Sun, 3rd Class, Gold Rays with Neck Ribbon (3 November 2026)

== Personal life ==
Kim is married to Jae Eun Chung, with whom he has two daughters. He speaks Korean and Japanese, as well as English.

== See also ==
- North Korea–United States relations
- Philippines–United States relations
- Division of Korea
- Korean War

Diplomatic posts
Preceded by Cameron Munter	United States Special Envoy for the Six-Party Talks; 2008–2011	Succeeded by Clifford Hart
Preceded by Kathleen Stephens	United States Ambassador to South Korea; 2011–2014	Succeeded by Mark Lippert
Preceded by Glyn T. Davies	United States Special Envoy for North Korea Policy; 2014–2016	Succeeded by Joseph Y. Yun
Preceded by Philip Goldberg	United States Ambassador to the Philippines; 2016–2020	Succeeded by John C. Law (Chargé d’Affaires); MaryKay Carlson
Preceded by Joseph R. Donovan Jr.	United States Ambassador to Indonesia; 2020–2023	Succeeded by Michael F. Kleine (Chargé d’Affaires)
Preceded by Stephen Biegun	United States Special Envoy for the DPRK; 2021–2023	Succeeded by Jung H. Pak
