= Joseph Y. Yun =

American diplomat

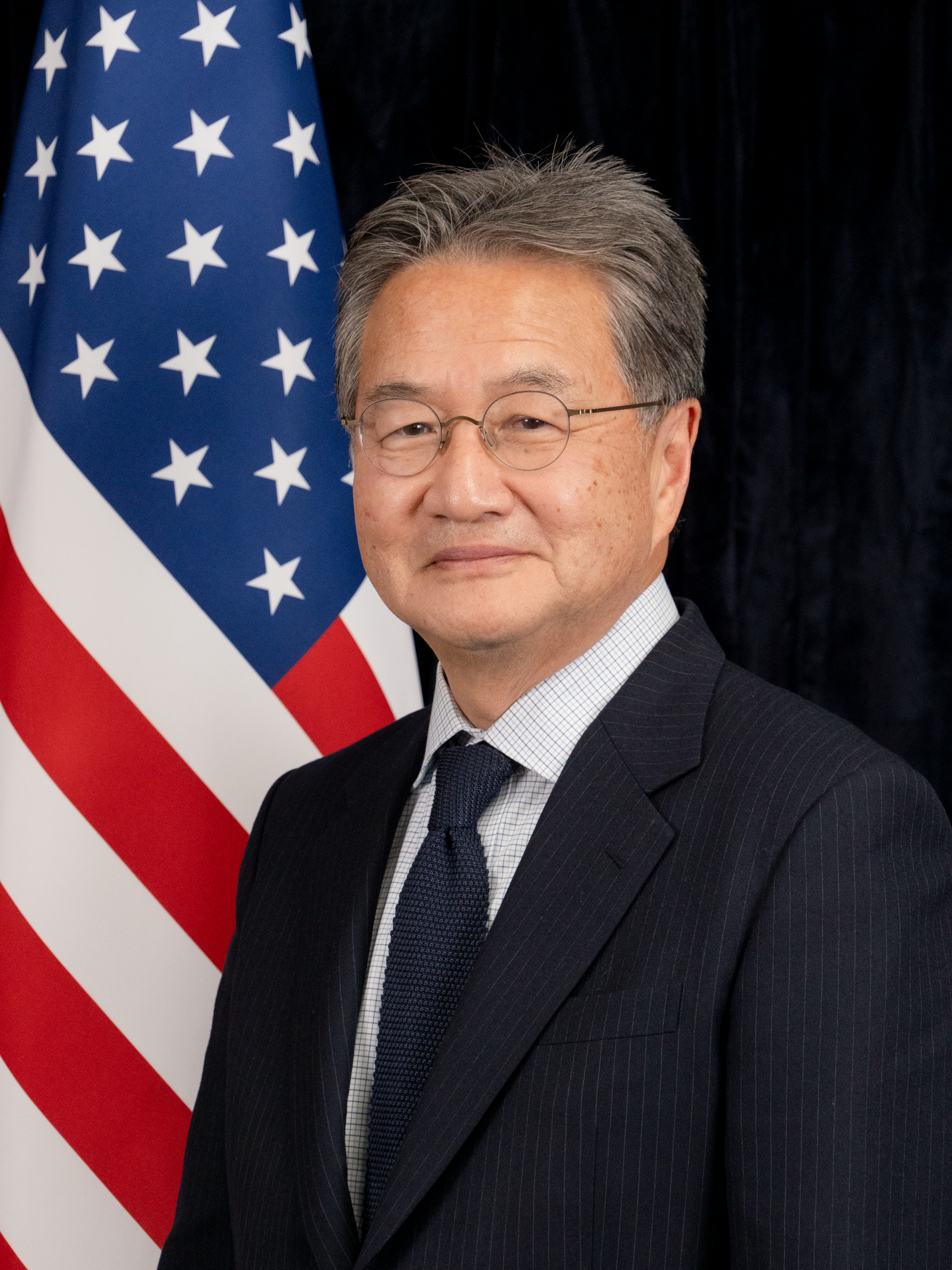
- Yun in 2025

U.S. Chargé d'Affaires to South Korea
- In office January 10, 2025 – October 24, 2025
- President: Joe Biden; Donald Trump
- Preceded by: Philip S. Goldberg
- Succeeded by: Y. Kevin Kim (Chargé d'affaires)

U.S. Special Presidential Envoy for Compact Negotiations
- In office March 22, 2022 – October 22, 2023
- President: Joe Biden

United States Special Representative for North Korea Policy
- In office October 17, 2016 – March 2, 2018
- President: Barack Obama; Donald Trump
- Preceded by: Sung Kim
- Succeeded by: Stephen Biegun

19th United States Ambassador to Malaysia
- In office October 3, 2013 – October 14, 2016
- President: Barack Obama
- Preceded by: Paul W. Jones
- Succeeded by: Kamala Shirin Lakhdhir

Personal details
- Born: Yun Yuo-sang; August 29, 1954 (age 72) Seoul, South Korea
- Spouse: Melanie Billings-Yun
- Education: Cardiff University (BS); London School of Economics (MS, MPhil)

Joseph Yuosang Yun is an American retired diplomat, most recently serving as the acting U.S. Ambassador to South Korea. His previous assignment was as U.S. Special Presidential Envoy for Compact Negotiations, appointed in March 2022 by President Joe Biden to negotiate amendments to the Compact of Free Association (CFA), the agreement governing the relationship between the United States and the Freely Associated States (FAS) of the Federated States of Micronesia, the Republic of the Marshall Islands, and Palau.

A 35-year career diplomat and negotiator, Yun is an expert on Asia-Pacific affairs, having served multiple tours throughout the region and within the State Department. Previous assignments include U.S. Special Representative for North Korea Policy, U.S. Ambassador to Malaysia, and Principal Deputy Assistant Secretary in the State Department Bureau of East Asian and Pacific Affairs, He is recognized as one of the nation's leading experts on North Korea, as well as on broader East Asian policy. He is currently a non-resident senior advisor with the Freeman Center in China Studies at the Center for Strategic and International Studies (CSIS).

== Early life and education ==
Born in Seoul, Yun left South Korea for Nigeria in 1964, following his father, a doctor with the World Health Organization. Yun was educated from middle school on in the United Kingdom, earning his bachelor's degree from Cardiff University in 1976, and Master of Science and Master of Philosophy degrees from the London School of Economics. He met his wife, Melanie Billings-Yun, at LSE and they were married in 1977. They have one son, Matthew Yun.

== Diplomatic career ==
Yun joined the United States Foreign Service in 1985. In 2000, following tours in Hong Kong, Indonesia, Washington, DC, Paris, and Seoul, he was appointed Economic Counselor in the U.S. Embassy in Bangkok, managing economic, labor and environmental issues. In 2004 he attended the Asia Pacific Center for Security Studies, then took a 6-month assignment as senior adviser on the State Department Korea Desk. He returned to the U.S. Embassy in Seoul in 2005 as the Minister-Counselor for Political Affairs, in charge of domestic, regional, and bilateral political issues.

In 2009 Yun was posted back in Washington as Director of the State Department Office of Maritime Southeast Asia. The following year he was named Deputy Assistant Secretary for Southeast Asia, and in 2011 he was appointed Principal Deputy Assistant Secretary for the Bureau of East Asian and Pacific Affairs (EAP). During his time in EAP, Yun worked closely on President Obama's Asian rebalance policy, especially in Southeast Asia. Notable accomplishments included the diplomatic normalization of American relations with Myanmar, the establishment of a US mission for ASEAN, and the inauguration of United States participation in the annual East Asian Summit.

For his work, the State Department has honored him with a Presidential Meritorious Service Award, three Superior Honors Awards, and nine Foreign Service Performance Awards.

=== Ambassador to Malaysia ===
Nominated by President Barack Obama to serve as Ambassador to Malaysia on July 23, 2013, Yun was confirmed by the U.S. Senate on August 1. As Ambassador, Yun emphasized stronger bilateral ties between the United States and Malaysia in all aspects: security, diplomatic, economic and people-to-people. During his three-year tenure, President Obama visited Malaysia twice, in 2014 and 2015. Prior to those trips, the last US president to visit Malaysia was Lyndon B. Johnson in 1966. During his 2014 visit, President Obama and Prime Minister Najib Razak signed the Comprehensive Partnership Agreement, pledging the United States and Malaysia to work closely together on security, business, education and technology issues. Yun also inaugurated the Oregon-Sabah Collaborative, bringing together private citizens, local governments, universities and civil society from the two states to promote educational exchange, forest and wildlife conservation, and business ties. For his work in this area, Yun received the Individual Achievement Award from the Oregon Consular Corps in 2016.

=== Special Representative for North Korea Policy ===
On October 17, 2016, Yun assumed the office of United States Special Representative for North Korea Policy, heading all coordination and implementation of U.S. policy toward North Korea, especially concerning denuclearization. Concurrently, he held the office of Deputy Assistant Secretary for Korea and Japan, managing relations with America's principal allies in developing a coordinated policy toward North Korea.

Yun was the key diplomat securing the release of American student Otto Warmbier who had been imprisoned in North Korea for nearly a year and a half. In May 2017, Yun met secretly in Oslo with North Korean officials to gain diplomatic access to the four American prisoners held in Pyongyang. Learning on June 6 that Warmbier had been in a vegetative state for the past 15 months, Yun flew with a medical team on an emergency mission to Pyongyang to secure his immediate release on "humanitarian grounds". He and the team returned Warmbier to his parents' care in the United States on June 12. While in Pyongyang, Yun also conducted a consular visit with the remaining American prisoners, the first since March 2016.

As part of the agreement to release Warmbier, the North Koreans demanded $2 million as "repayment for medical expenses." Yun confirmed that he signed a pledge to pay that sum on the direct instructions of Secretary of State Rex Tillerson. However, Trump said in April 2019 that no money had ever been paid. In the book The Madman Theory by Jim Sciutto, Yun stated that they started with believing that only Kim Jong Un was unpredictable but they eventually had to accept that Donald Trump was as unpredictable and that they had to be "careful what options you gave him (Trump)" because any option you put out there, he could use. Yun said that the White House was looking at all options however extreme, but it was then-Secretary James Mattis that refused to provide certain options for this reason.

=== Special Presidential Envoy for Compact Negotiations ===
Yun retired from the U.S. State Department on March 2, 2018, He took positions as Senior Advisor with The Asia Group and the United States Institute of Peace and became a regular analyst on North Korea for CNN. In March 2022 the Biden administration brought him back as Special Presidential Envoy For Compact Negotiations to revive the Compacts of Free Association negotiations with the three strategically important Pacific Island countries of Micronesia, Marshall Islands, and Palau, which had been stalled since December 2020. The COFA agreements were set to expire in 2023 for the first countries and in 2024 for Palau, raising US governments concerns about recent economic overtures from China as the deadline neared. Key issues included economic assistance stemming from historic U.S. nuclear testing on the islands, the continuing presence of U.S. military bases and the ballistic missile test site at Kwajalein Atoll, and climate change mitigation. Negotiations were successfully completed and 20-year assistance agreements totaling $6.5 billion were signed in May 2023 with Micronesia and Palau and in October with the Marshall Islands. Yun retired as Special Presidential Envoy upon completion of the three agreements.

=== Chargé d'Affaires to South Korea ===
On January 11, 2025, Yun was again called back to service by the Biden Administration to serve as acting Ambassador to South Korea. His arrival came in the midst of South Korea's martial law crisis, instigated by President Yoon Suk Yeol on December 3. Though Yoon's attempted coup failed, the situation in Seoul remained in flux, with no clear leader of the government and massive public protests. The State Department was deeply concerned to retain the strong bilateral alliance during what was predicted to be a "challenging" aftermath, especially given that the head of embassy was to become vacant on January 10 with the retirement of outgoing Ambassador Philip Goldberg.

During Yun's tenure as chargé, Korea had two acting presidents from the conservative Peoples' Power Party (Choi Sang-mok and Han Duk-soo) prior to the election of opposition Democratic Party of Korea (DPK) candidate Lee Jae-Myung in June 2025. Yun served until October 24, 2025, when he returned to retirement.

== See also ==
- Human rights in North Korea
- Korean Americans in New York City
- North Korea-United States relations

Diplomatic posts
Preceded by Paul W. Jones	United States Ambassador to Malaysia; 2013–2016	Succeeded by Kamala Shirin Lakhdhir
Preceded by Sung Kim	United States Special Representative for North Korea Policy; 2016–2018	Succeeded by Stephen Biegun
New post	U.S. Special Presidential Envoy for Compact Negotiations; 2022-2023	Vacant
