= Jean H. Lee =

American journalist

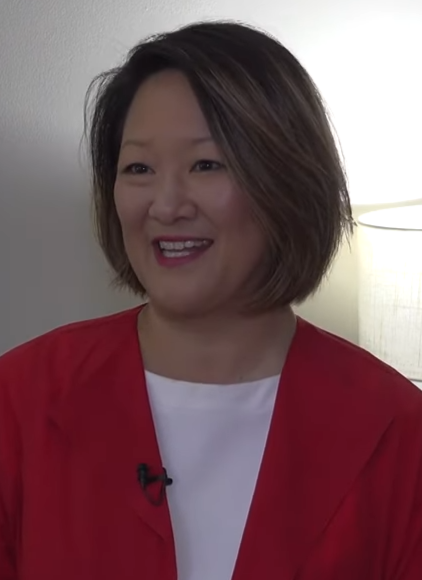
- Lee in 2023
- Born: Minneapolis, United States
- Education: Columbia University (BA, MS)
- Occupations: journalist, podcast host
- Known for: Pyongyang bureau chief of the Associated Press

Jean H. Lee is an American journalist. She previously served as the Associated Press's Pyongyang bureau chief and was the director of the Hyundai Motor-Korea Foundation Center for Korean History and Public Policy at the Wilson Center.

== Biography ==
Lee is a native of Minneapolis. She received her B.A. in East Asian studies and English literature from Columbia University in 1992 and her M.S. from Columbia University Graduate School of Journalism in 1995.

She first worked for The Korea Herald in Seoul, and then joined the Associated Press (AP) and was assigned to bureaus in Baltimore; Fresno, California.; San Francisco; New York; London; Seoul, where she was AP's South Korean bureau chief.

In 2011, she was the first American reporter granted extensive access to North Korea. In 2012, she opened AP's Pyongyang bureau, making it the first American media outlet with a full-time presence in the country, and served as bureau chief until 2013.

In 2015, she joined the Wilson Center as a public policy fellow. 2018, she was named director of the Wilson Center's Hyundai Motor-Korea Foundation Center for Korean History and Public Policy, a position she stepped from in 2021. She remains a senior fellow at the Wilson Center.

She is currently the co-host of the BBC podcast, "The Lazarus Heist," which is about a high-profile cybercrime that investigators have linked to North Korea.
