= Stephen Biegun =

American businessman and diplomat (born 1963)

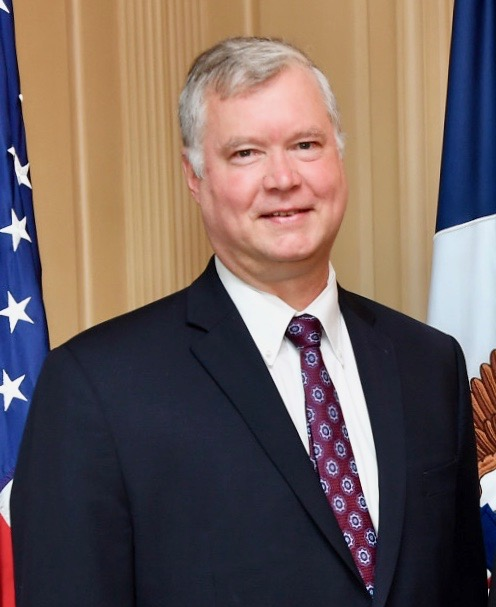
- Biegun in 2018

Acting United States Secretary of State
- In office January 20, 2021
- President: Joe Biden
- Preceded by: Mike Pompeo
- Succeeded by: Daniel Bennett Smith (acting)

20th United States Deputy Secretary of State
- In office December 21, 2019 – January 20, 2021
- President: Donald Trump
- Preceded by: John J. Sullivan
- Succeeded by: Wendy Sherman

United States Special Representative for North Korea
- In office August 23, 2018 – January 20, 2021
- President: Donald Trump
- Preceded by: Joseph Y. Yun
- Succeeded by: Sung Kim

Personal details
- Born: Stephen Edward Biegun; March 30, 1963 (age 63) Detroit, Michigan, U.S.
- Party: Republican
- Education: University of Michigan (BA)

Stephen Edward Biegun (born March 30, 1963) is an American businessman and diplomat who served as the United States deputy secretary of state from December 2019 to January 2021 and United States Special Representative for North Korea from August 2018 to January 2021, vice president of international governmental affairs for the Ford Motor Company, staffer on the National Security Council, as well as national security adviser to Senator Bill Frist.

== Early life and education ==
Stephen Edward Biegun was born in Detroit, Michigan. He earned a Bachelor of Arts degree in Russian and political science from the University of Michigan in 1984.

== Career ==
He was the in-country director for the International Republican Institute in Moscow, Russia, from 1992 to 1994. He was a member of the board of the U.S. Russia Foundation, the Moscow School of Political Studies, the U.S.–Russia Business Council, the National Bureau of Asian Research, the U.S.-ASEAN Business Council, and Freedom House.

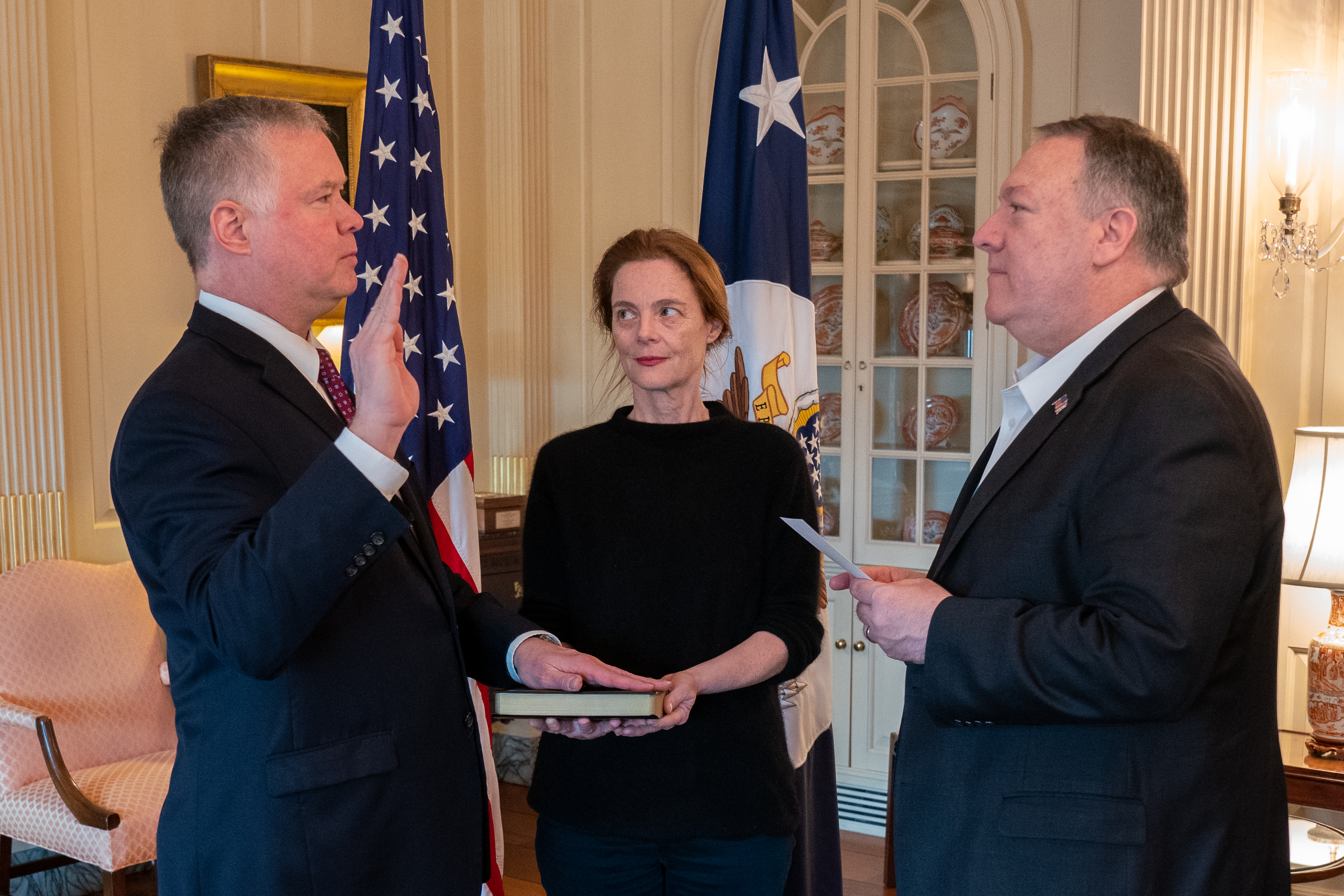
Biegun is sworn in by Secretary of State Mike Pompeo to serve as Deputy Secretary of State at the U.S. Department of State on December 21, 2019.

Biegun has held a number of offices within the federal government, including executive secretary of the National Security Council, reporting to national security adviser Condoleezza Rice under President George W. Bush. He was a foreign policy adviser to Sarah Palin during John McCain's 2008 presidential campaign. On March 1, 2018, it was reported that Biegun was a top candidate to replace Donald Trump's national security adviser H. R. McMaster. On March 22, it was announced that McMaster would instead be succeeded by John Bolton.

On August 23, 2018, U.S. Secretary of State Mike Pompeo appointed Biegun as the U.S. special representative for North Korea, directing policy in regard to North Korea on behalf of the Trump administration.

On August 7, 2019, The Wall Street Journal reported that Biegun was a top candidate to replace Jon Huntsman Jr. as United States ambassador to Russia. After John Sullivan was instead nominated, Biegun was nominated to replace him as deputy secretary of state on October 31, 2019. His nomination was confirmed by a 90–3 vote of the U.S. Senate on December 19, 2019. He was sworn in two days later.

Diplomatic posts
Preceded by Joseph Yun	United States Special Representative for North Korea Policy; 2018–2021	Succeeded by Sung Kim
Political offices
Preceded by John Sullivan	United States Deputy Secretary of State; 2019–2021	Succeeded by Wendy Sherman
Preceded by Mike Pompeo	United States Secretary of State; Acting; 2021	Succeeded by Daniel Bennett Smith; Acting
