= List of United States special representatives for North Korea =

United States Special Representative for North Korea 대북특별대표
- Seal of the United States Department of State
- Nominator: The president of the United States
- Appointer: Secretary of State

The United States special representative for the Democratic People’s Republic of Korea is the top US State Department official who represents the United States' interests with respect to North Korea in a diplomatic context. North Korea and the United States have no formal diplomatic relations. (See North Korea–United States relations.) Sweden acts as the protecting power of United States interests in North Korea for consular matters.

== History ==
Jay Lefkowitz was President George W. Bush's special envoy for human rights in North Korea.

Robert R. King served as special envoy on North Korean human rights issues from November 2009 to January 2017.

Stephen W. Bosworth served as special envoy to North Korea from 2009 to 2011, under President Obama. He had previously been an ambassador to several countries, including to South Korea from 1997 to 2001.

Glyn Davies served as the special representative for North Korea policy from January 2012 to November 2014.

Sung Kim served as the special representative for North Korea policy from November 2014 to September 2016 and as special envoy for the six-party talks from 2008 to 2011.

Joseph Y. Yun served as the special representative for North Korea policy from October 17, 2016, to March 2, 2018.

Stephen Biegun was appointed by Secretary Mike Pompeo and served from 2018 to 2021.

President Joe Biden announced on May 21, 2021 that Sung Kim would serve as the U.S. special envoy for North Korea.

== List of officeholders ==
=== Special representatives ===
No.	Special representatives	Term start	Term end	US president	NK supreme leader
1	Stephen W. Bosworth	February 20, 2009	October 26, 2011	Barack Obama	Kim Jong-il
2	Glyn T. Davies	October 26, 2011	November 6, 2014	Barack Obama	Kim Jong-il
2	Glyn T. Davies	October 26, 2011	November 6, 2014	Barack Obama	Kim Jong-un
3	Sung Kim	November 6, 2014	November 3, 2016	Barack Obama	Kim Jong-un
4	Joseph Y. Yun	October 17, 2016	March 2, 2018	Barack Obama	Kim Jong-un
4	Joseph Y. Yun	October 17, 2016	March 2, 2018	Donald Trump	Kim Jong-un
5	Stephen Biegun	August 23, 2018	January 20, 2021	Donald Trump	Kim Jong-un
6	Sung Kim	May 21, 2021	November 21, 2023	Joe Biden	Kim Jong-un
7	Jung H. Pak	November 21, 2023	July 5, 2024	Joe Biden	Kim Jong-un

=== Special envoys on North Korean human rights issues ===
No.	Special envoys	Term start	Term end	US president	NK supreme leader
1	Jay Lefkowitz	August 19, 2005	January 2009	George W. Bush	Kim Jong-il
2	Robert R. King	November 24, 2009	January 12, 2017	Barack Obama	Kim Jong-il; Kim Jong-un
3	Julie Turner	October 13, 2023	January 23, 2025	Joe Biden	Kim Jong-un

=== Special envoys for the six-party talks ===
Special envoys	Term start	Term end	US president	NK supreme leader
Jack Pritchard	April 2001	September 2003	George W. Bush	Kim Jong-il
James A. Kelly	September 2003	January 2005	George W. Bush	Kim Jong-il
Christopher R. Hill	February 14, 2005	2008	George W. Bush; Barack Obama	Kim Jong-il
Sung Kim	July 31, 2008	October 13, 2011	Barack Obama	Kim Jong-il
Clifford Hart	October 31, 2011	July 23, 2013	Barack Obama	Kim Jong-il; Kim Jong-un
Sydney Seiler	September 2, 2014	2015	Barack Obama	Kim Jong-un

== See also ==
- Division of Korea
- Human rights in North Korea
- Korean Americans in New York City
- Korean War
- North Korea–United States relations
- Foreign relations of North Korea
- List of ambassadors of the United States to South Korea
