= List of North Korea–Russia summits =

The following is a list of diplomatic meetings between North Korea and Russia.

== List ==
- 2019 North Korea–Russia summit
- 2023 North Korea–Russia summit
- 2024 North Korea–Russia summit
