= North Korea–Russia relations =

- North Korea: Russia

Diplomatic mission
- Embassy of North Korea, Moscow: Embassy of Russia, Pyongyang

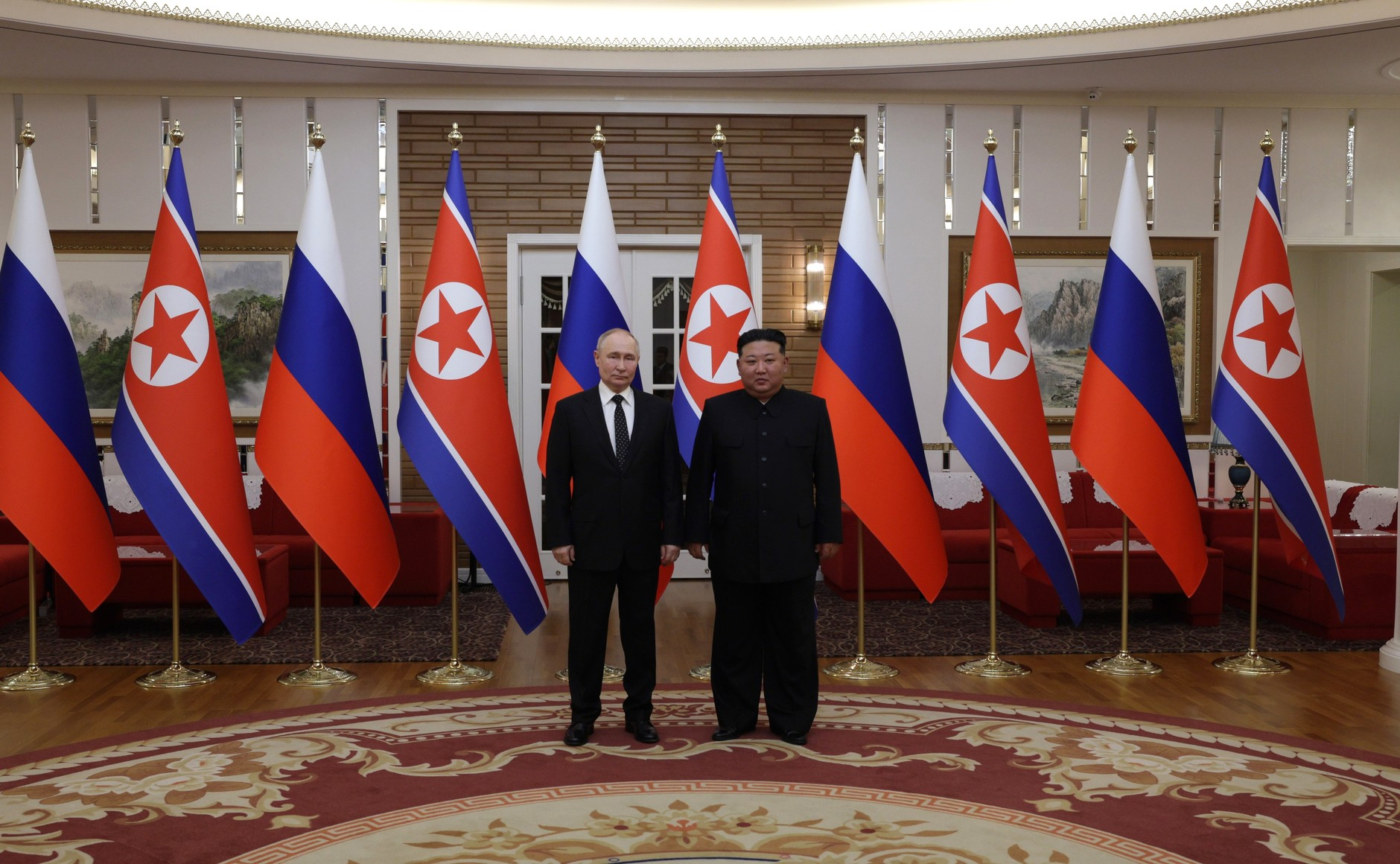
Russian President Vladimir Putin (left) and General Secretary of the Workers' Party of Korea Kim Jong Un (right), at the Forbidden City in Pyongyang during the North Korea–Russia summit in June 2024.

North Korea and Russia share close military and security relations. Both nations share interest in a geopolitical alignment in challenging the West. The two states share a border along the lower Tumen River, which is 17 kilometers (11 mi) long.

The Soviet Union occupied the northern part of the Korean Peninsula after the surrender of Japan in 1945. The Soviet Union was responsible for the creation of North Korea, and installed Kim Il Sung as the new nation's leader. After the proclamation of the Democratic People's Republic of Korea in 1948, the Soviet Union became the first country to recognize it as the sole legitimate authority in Korea. The Soviet Union supported North Korea during the Korean War. North Korea received major Soviet military and political support during the Cold War. The personality cult around North Korea's Kim family was heavily influenced by Stalinism. China and the Soviet Union competed for influence in North Korea after the Sino-Soviet split in the 1960s, leading North Korea to seek autonomy from both nations. In 1961, North Korea and the Soviet Union signed a Treaty of Friendship, Cooperation and Mutual Assistance.

Soviet leader Mikhail Gorbachev began to reduce aid to the North after 1985, favoring closer ties with South Korea. After the dissolution of the Soviet Union, North Korea kept diplomatic ties with the Russian Federation, though ties stagnated under President Boris Yeltsin. Under President Vladimir Putin, the relationship initially deteriorated due to North Korea's nuclear program, which Russia opposed at the time. Russia condemned the 2006 North Korean missile test and supported sanctions against North Korea after subsequent nuclear tests. In 2012 Russia agreed to write off 90% of North Korea's debt to Russia. Relations started improving after 2018, with North Korean leader Kim Jong Un visiting Russia in 2019.

The two countries have grown significantly closer since the 2022 Russian invasion of Ukraine. In 2022, North Korea became the third country to recognise the independence of the breakaway states of Donetsk and Luhansk People's Republics in eastern Ukraine, leading Ukraine to terminate diplomatic ties. Beginning from September 2022, Russia reportedly purchased millions of shells and rockets from North Korea to aid in the war. In 2024, North Korea sent workers to Russia, which lacks workforce due to the war, and deployed troops into Kursk to support the Russian war effort. In the same year, North Korea and Russia signed the Treaty on Comprehensive Strategic Partnership, formalizing a defense treaty between the two nations. Russia in turn started providing technological, military and economic aid to North Korea, and dropped its opposition to the North Korean nuclear program.

== Soviet Union ==
North Korea–Soviet Union relations
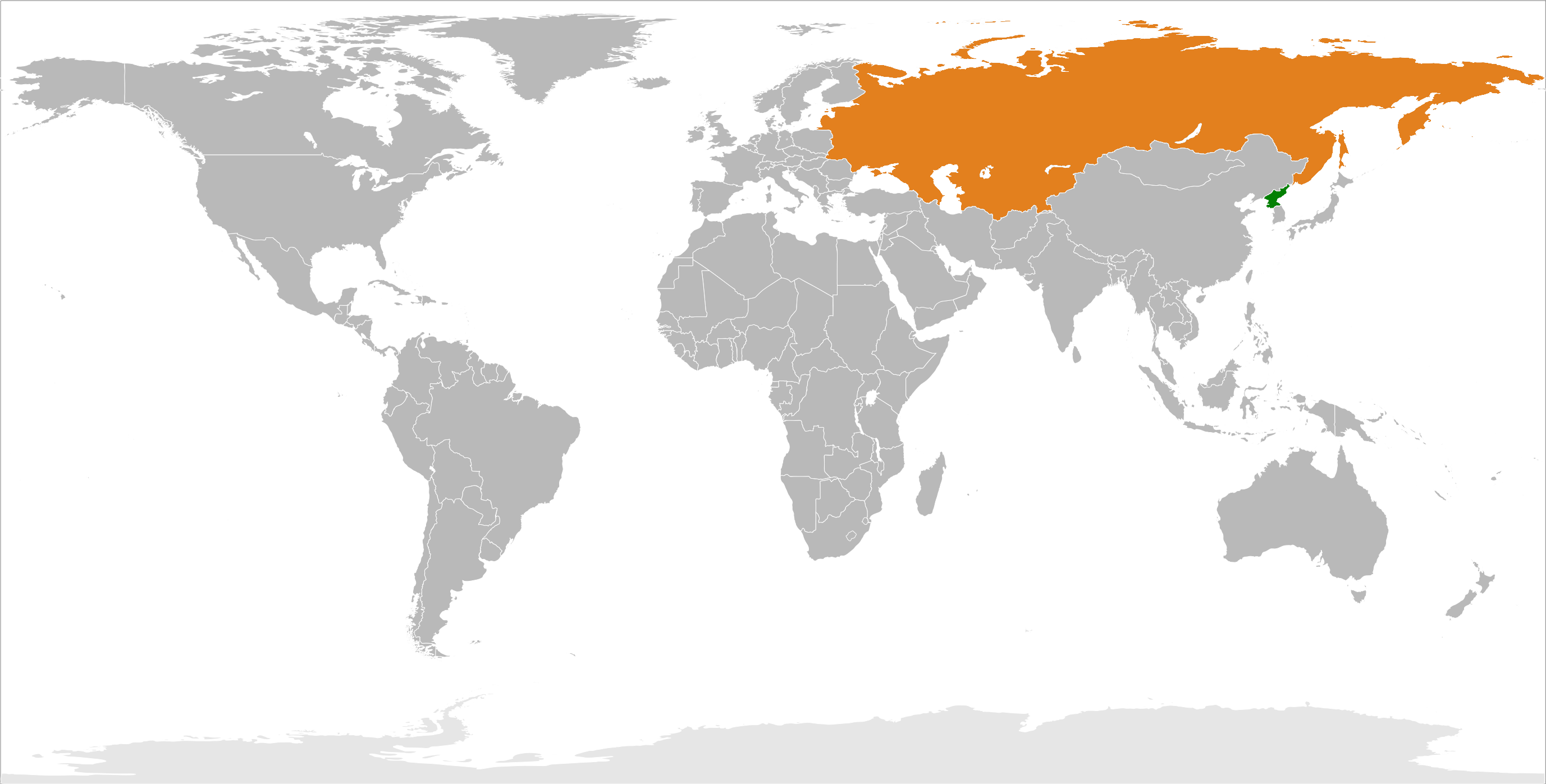

- North Korea: Soviet Union

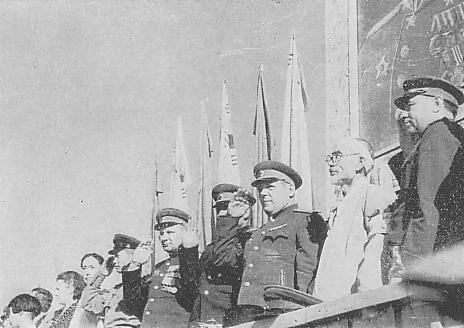
Welcome ceremony for the Red Army in Pyongyang, 1945

Soviet troops invaded the Japanese colony of Korea in 1945; by the agreement with the U.S., the 38th parallel was the dividing line with Moscow in charge to the north and Washington to the South. North Korea came under the control of the Soviet Civil Administration and People's Committee of North Korea from 1945 to 1948. In December 1945, the Soviets installed Kim as first secretary of the North Korean Branch Bureau of the Communist Party of Korea. As chairman of the committee, Kim was "the top Korean administrative leader in the North," though he was still de facto subordinate to Soviet General Terentii Shtykov until the Chinese intervention in the Korean War. On 10 July 1948, the Democratic People's Republic of Korea (DPRK) was officially established. On 12 October, the Soviet Union recognized the DPRK as the sovereign government of the entire peninsula, including the south.

Archival material suggests that North Korea's decision to invade South Korea was Kim's initiative, not a Soviet one. Evidence suggests that Soviet intelligence, through its espionage sources in the US government and British SIS, had obtained information on the limitations of US atomic bomb stockpiles as well as defense program cuts, leading Stalin to conclude that the Truman administration would not intervene in Korea. The Soviet 64th Fighter Aviation Corps took part in the Korean War where they provided North Korea and China with badly needed pilots. The Soviet Union had provided much support to North Korea during the Cold War. As part of the Communist bloc, North Korea received major Soviet military and political support during the Cold War.

In 1956, at the 2nd Plenary Session of the 3rd Central Committee, leading pro-China Korean figures known as the Yan'an faction attempted to remove Kim Il Sung from power with the support of China and the Soviet Union, but failed. This incident has become known as the August faction incident and forms the historical basis for North Korean fears of Chinese interference. A joint Soviet-Chinese delegation co-headed by Anastas Mikoyan and Peng Dehuai were sent to Pyongyang to instruct Kim Il Sung to cease any purge and reinstate the leaders of the Yan'an and Soviet factions in September 1956, leading Kim to backtrack partially.

In 1956, North Korea did not accept Nikita Khrushchev's program of de-Stalinization. Khrushchev promoted the concept of collective leadership, and the Soviet embassy in North Korea started advising Kim Il Sung to either give up his position as WPK leader or as premier. Kim wanted to retain both positions, but was prepared to yield one of the positions to a close ally; he recommended Choe Yong-gon to the Soviet embassy. However, by 1957, Kim started to advise the Soviet embassy against appointing Choe. Kim also proposed Kim Il, who had little political independence. Over the following months, Kim Il Sung and his allies Nam Il and Pak Chong-ae started investigating the degree of the demands by the Soviet embassy. Soviet ambassador Alexander Puzanov did not push hard on the issue of division of powers, including in a personal meeting with Kim. This eventually led Kim to directly ignored Soviet advice and stay on as premier. The Soviet Union did not intervene, highlighting declining Soviet influence in North Korea.

China and the Soviet Union competed for influence in North Korea during the Sino-Soviet split in the 1960s, as North Korea tried to maintain good relations with both countries, though also favoring autonomy from both. The 1961 DPRK-Soviet Union Treaty of Friendship, Cooperation and Mutual Assistance underpinned cooperation during the Cold War. After Khrushchev was replaced by Leonid Brezhnev in 1964, North Korea's relations with the Soviet Union became closer.

Moscow under Mikhail Gorbachev began to reduce aid to the North after 1985 in favor of reconciliation with South Korea. Military equipment continued to be provided until a last batch of MiG-29s was delivered in 1989. General Secretary Kim Il Sung visited the USSR five times, with the last time being in 1986 during the early Gorbachev era. He also met with Soviet officials abroad, including with Soviet leader Leonid Brezhnev during the funeral of Yugoslav President Josip Broz Tito in May 1980.

== Russian Federation ==
=== Under Boris Yeltsin ===
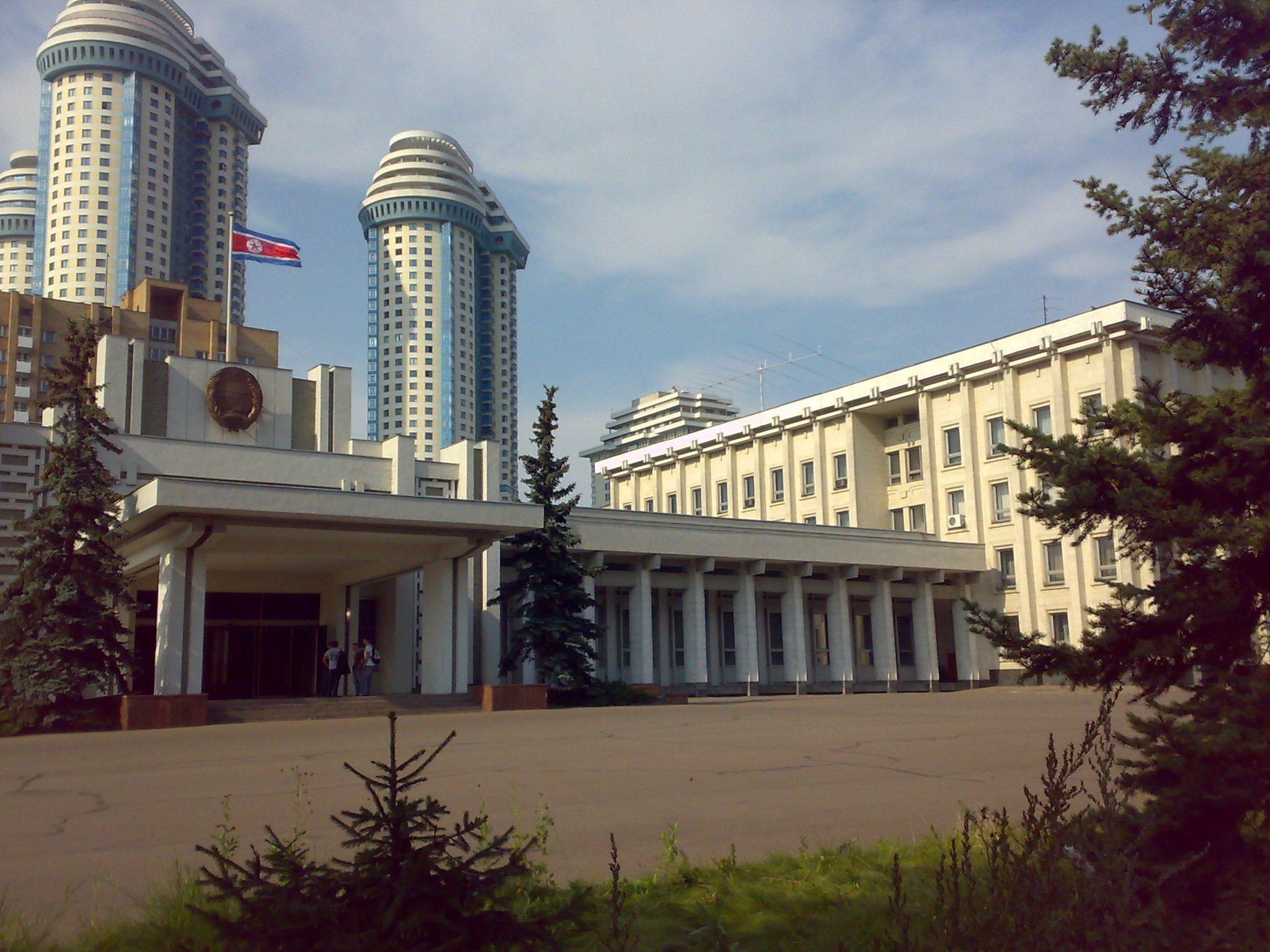
Embassy of North Korea in Moscow

After the dissolution of the USSR, the new Russian government under Boris Yeltsin refused to provide support for North Korea, favoring South Korea instead.

The first meeting of the Inter-governmental Commission for Trade, Economic, and Scientific-Technical Cooperation between Russia and DPRK was held in the spring of 1996 led by Deputy Premier Vitali Ignatenko. This was the highest-level meeting (at the deputy prime ministerial level) between Moscow and Pyongyang since the collapse of the Soviet Union. During the visit, the two countries agreed to restore bilateral trade and economic cooperation to its 1991 level. The two sides also agreed to restore bilateral inter-governmental commissions and to establish working-level bodies between North Korea and the Russian Far Eastern province for bilateral cooperation in science-technology, forestry, light industry, and transport. Ignatenko carried Yeltsin's personal message to Kim Jong Il. In the message, Yeltsin expressed his hopes for tension reduction on the Korean peninsula and North Korea's continuing observance of the Armistice Agreement. Kim Jong Il, expecting that Gennady Zyuganov, the General Secretary of the Communist Party of the Russian Federation, would win the coming presidential election in June–July 1996, did not even send a letter of reply, nor did he meet with the Russian delegation.

Since the mid-1990s, when it became apparent that South Korea would not become an important economic partner and that North Korea was not collapsing, Russia generally followed a strategy of diplomatic 'equidistance' between North and South Korea.

=== Under Vladimir Putin ===
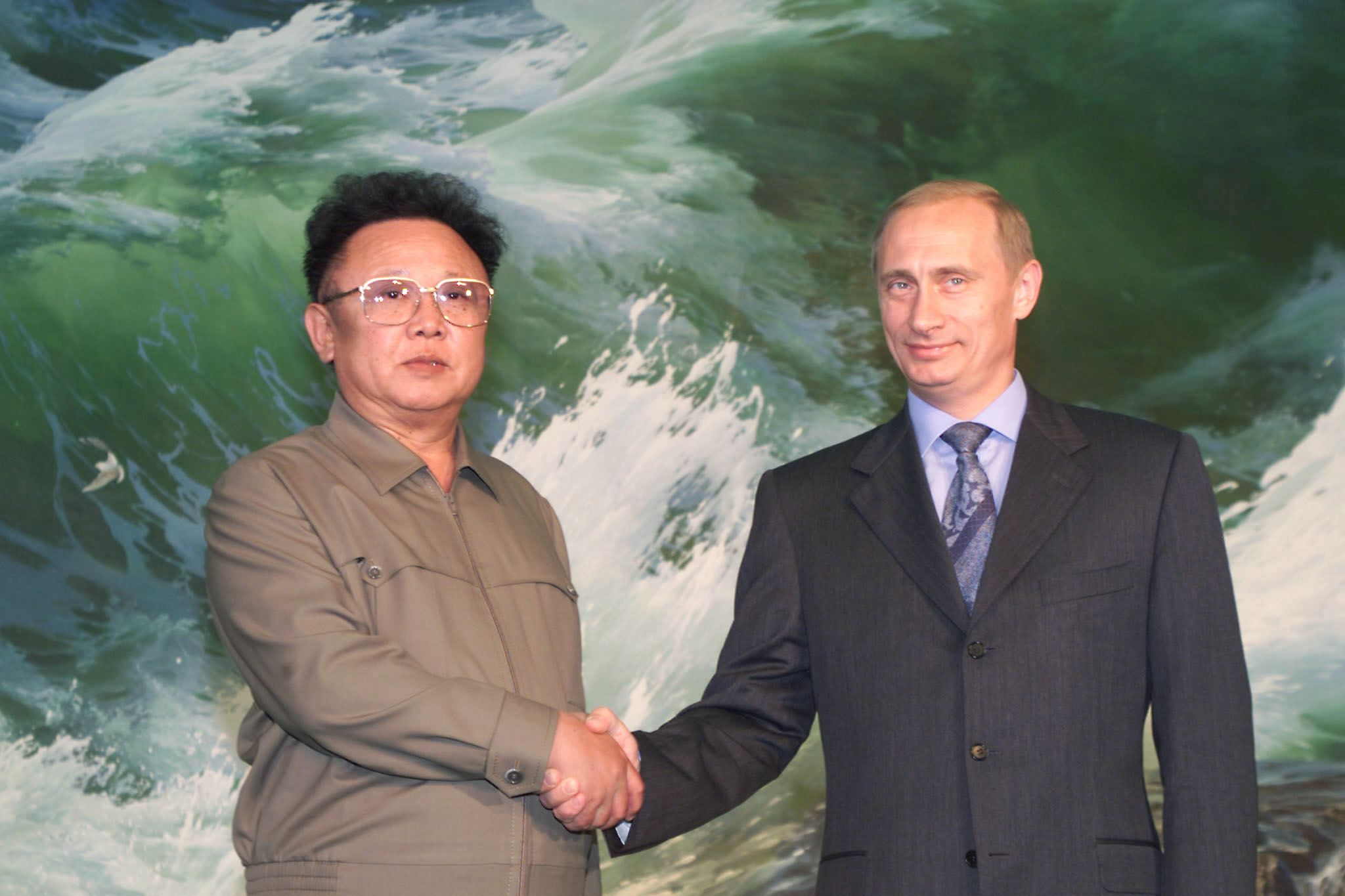
General Secretary of the Workers' Party of Korea Kim Jong Il with Russian President Vladimir Putin in Pyongyang, July 2000

Vladimir Putin's elevation to prime minister in August 1999 and then president in March 2000 had critical significance for Pyongyang, which attributed its previous grievances to Yeltsin's government. Kim Jong Il's references to Putin were to the effect that at last Russia had a leader "with whom to do business." However, intensive diplomatic work had to precede a historical breakthrough in Russia–DPRK relations. These efforts began to bear fruit in late 1998, and by March 1999, it became possible to agree completely on the text and the initial Treaty on Friendship, Good-Neighborly Relations and Cooperation. It was signed in February 2000, after Yeltsin left the political arena.

Starting in April 2000, covert preparations for a visit by President Putin to Pyongyang began. The first summit meeting in the history of Russian-Korean relations took place in July 2000 when a Joint Declaration was signed, the first international document signed by Kim Jong Il as General Secretary of the Workers' Party of Korea.

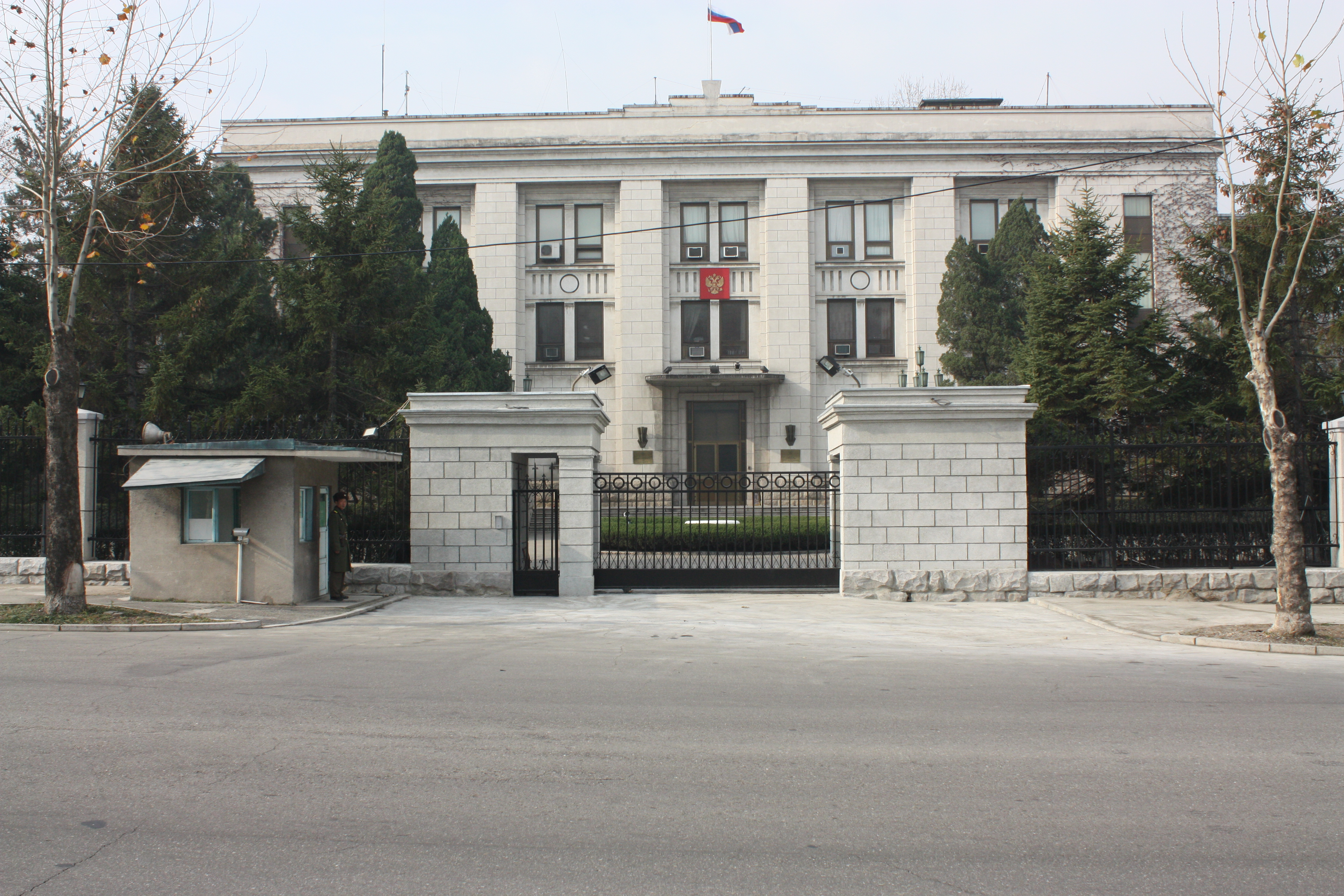
Embassy of Russia in Pyongyang

In April 2009, Russian Foreign Minister Sergey Lavrov visited North Korea and signed a plan with Mun Jae-chol, acting chairman of the Korean Committee for Cultural Relations with Foreign Countries on 2009–2010 of cultural and scientific exchange.

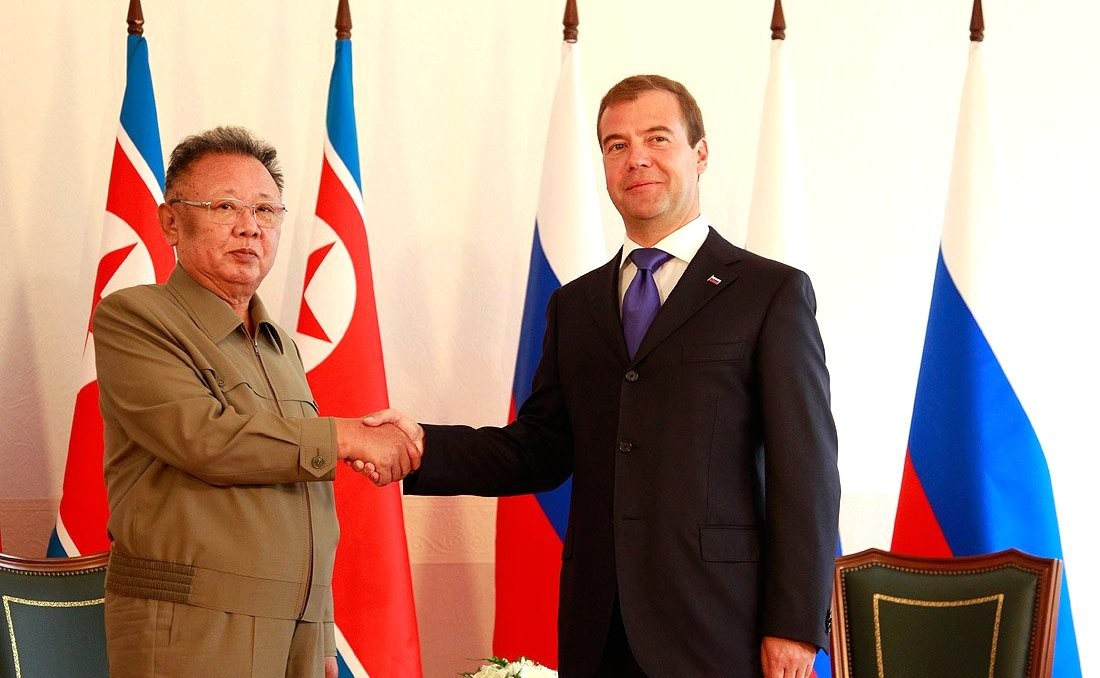
North Korean Leader Kim Jong Il with Russian President Dmitry Medvedev in Sosnovy Bor, August 2011

In December 2010 the North Korean Minister of Foreign Affairs visited Moscow to meet his Russian counterpart, Lavrov, in what was seen as North Korea trying to control criticism about its attack on South Korea's Yeonpyeong island. Lavrov told the North Korean official that Pyongyang's November 23 artillery strike on Yeonpyeong island "resulted in loss of life" and "deserves condemnation".

On October 18, 2011, Russian and North Korean officials marked the 63rd anniversary of the establishment of bilateral diplomatic ties in an event at the North Korean embassy in Moscow. The evening's event was attended by Russian Deputy Foreign Minister Alexei Borodavkin.

A delegation of Russia's Federal Air Transport Agency (Rosaviatsia) visited Pyongyang from December 12 to 14, 2011. On December 13 (Tuesday) Rosaviatsia director Neradiko Alexandr and Kang Ki-sop, director of General Bureau of Civil Aviation signed an agreement on civilian search and rescue between Russia and North Korea.

After Putin won the 2012 Russian presidential election, North Korean leader Kim Jong Un congratulated him, writing in a letter "I wish you achievement in your responsible work for building a powerful Russia", expressing belief that the traditional bilateral relations of friendship and cooperation would grow stronger.

In May 2012 Russia appointed Aleksandr Timonin as the new ambassador to North Korea. The latter presented his credentials to Kim Yong-nam at the Mansudae Assembly Hall. On June 27, 2012, during the visit of the Deputy Foreign Minister of the DPRK Kung Seok-ung to Moscow, Foreign Ministries of both countries have signed an inter-ministerial plan of exchanges on 2013–2014. On June 5, 2012, the two sides concluded a Boundary Treaty between the two states.

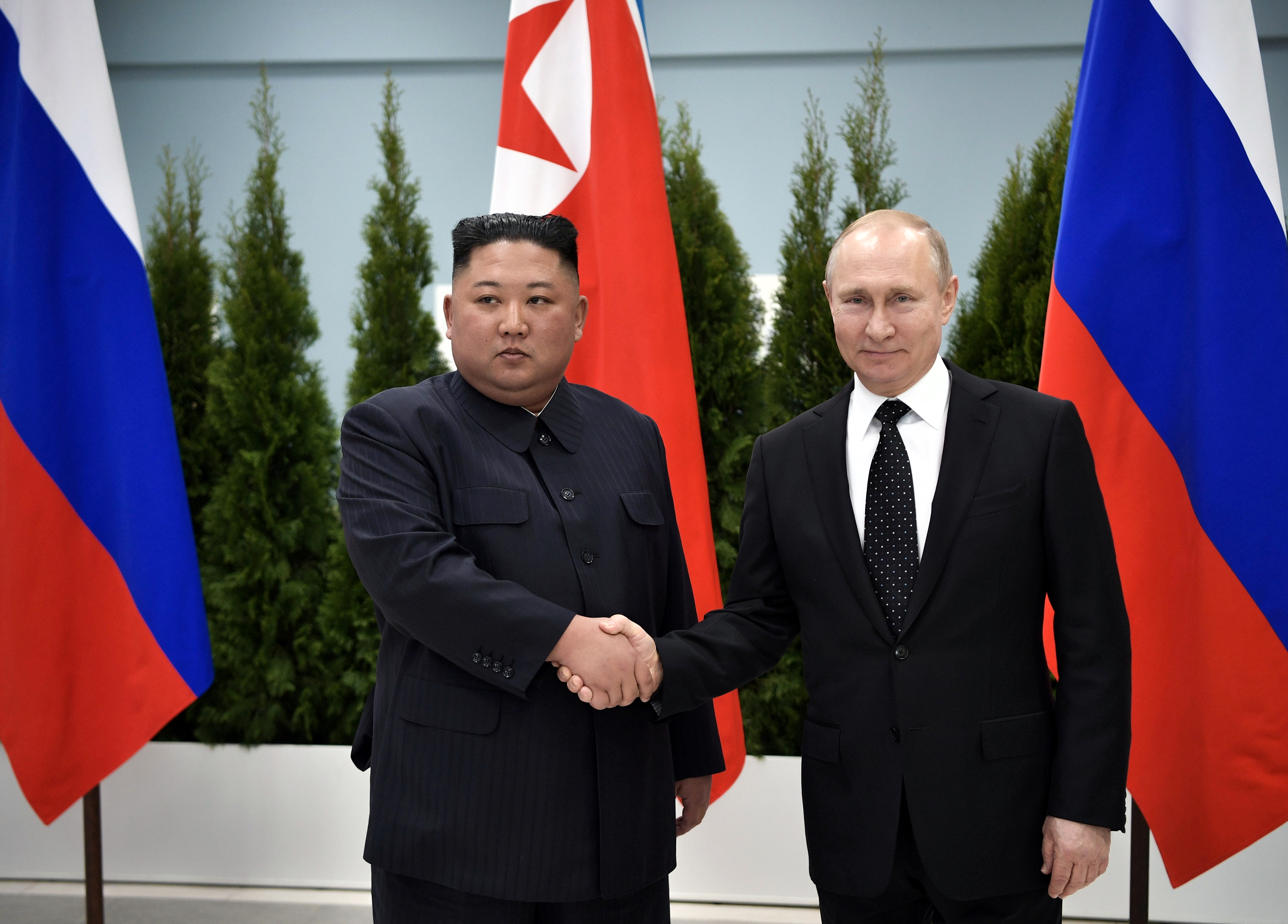
North Korean Supreme Leader Kim Jong-Un Meets Russian President Vladimir Putin in Vladivostok during the April 2019 summit

In February 2014, during the 2014 Winter Olympics in Sochi, Krasnodar Krai, a delegation headed by president of the Presidium of the Supreme People's Assembly Kim Yong-nam travelled to represent North Korea, even though the latter did not participate in these Olympics. Kim had a meeting with President Putin, and also met a number of Russian parliamentarians and state officials in Moscow en route to the Games in Sochi. These included senators Valentina Matvienko and Ilyas Umakhanov of the Federation Council, Mikhail Margelov, the chair of the International Affairs Committee of the same body, and Vice Foreign Minister Igor Morgulov. Korean Central Television (KCTV) also introduced the opening ceremony of the Sochi Winter Olympics on the day it took place, the 8th, focusing on the presence of Kim Yong-nam.

North Korea recognizes the Russian annexation of Crimea in 2014. In October 2014, the new North Korean Foreign Minister, Ri Su-yong, made a ten-day visit to Russia. In November 2014 North Korean leader Kim Jong Un's special envoy, Choe Ryong-hae, made a seven-day visit to Russia. During his trip, he met with Russian President Vladimir Putin, delivering a letter to him from Kim Jong Un, and with Russian Foreign Minister Sergey Lavrov.

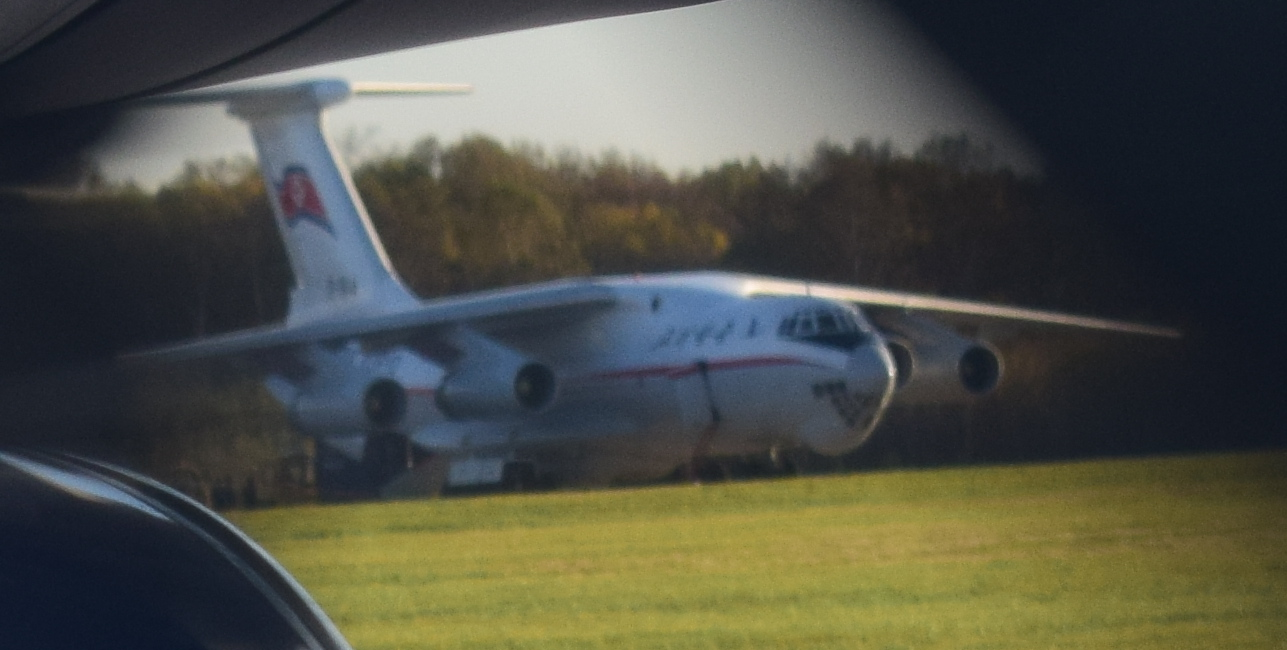
North Korean cargo jet at Vladivostok International Airport in October 2018

In April 2019, Kim travelled by armored train to Vladivostok to meet Putin, the first meeting between the two leaders. Kim Jong Un requested Russian leader Vladimir Putin's help in resolving a nuclear stalemate with the U.S.

==== Russo-Ukrainian war ====
In February 2022, Russia launched an invasion of Ukraine. On 2 March, North Korea was one of the five countries to vote against a United Nations resolution condemning the invasion. North Korea became the third country (the second being Syria) to recognise the independence of the breakaway states of Donetsk and Luhansk People's Republics in Eastern Ukraine. In response to the recognition, Ukraine terminated diplomatic ties with North Korea.

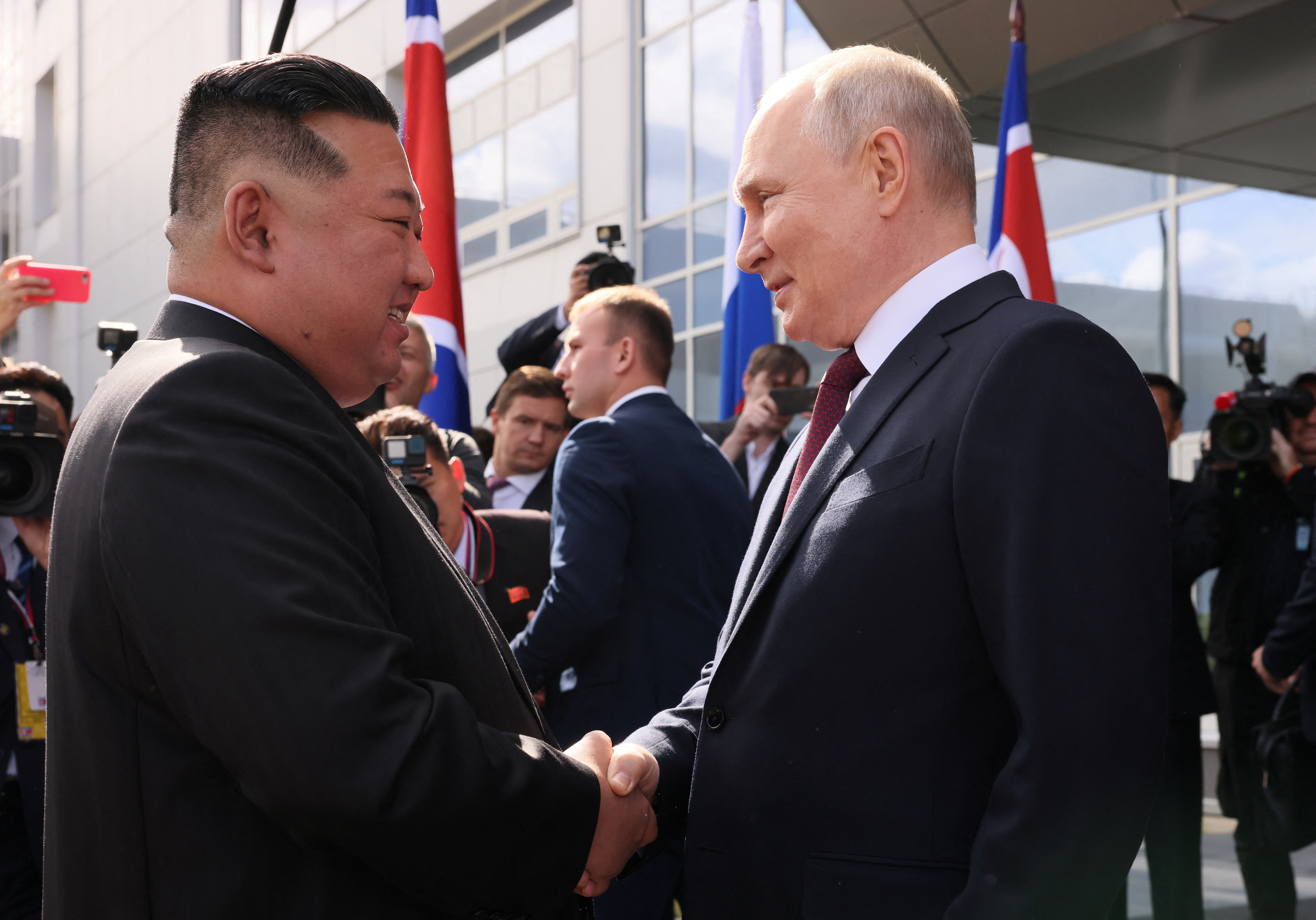
Kim Jong Un and Vladimir Putin meeting at Vostochny Cosmodrome in Amur Oblast, during the 2023 North Korea–Russia summit 13 September 2023

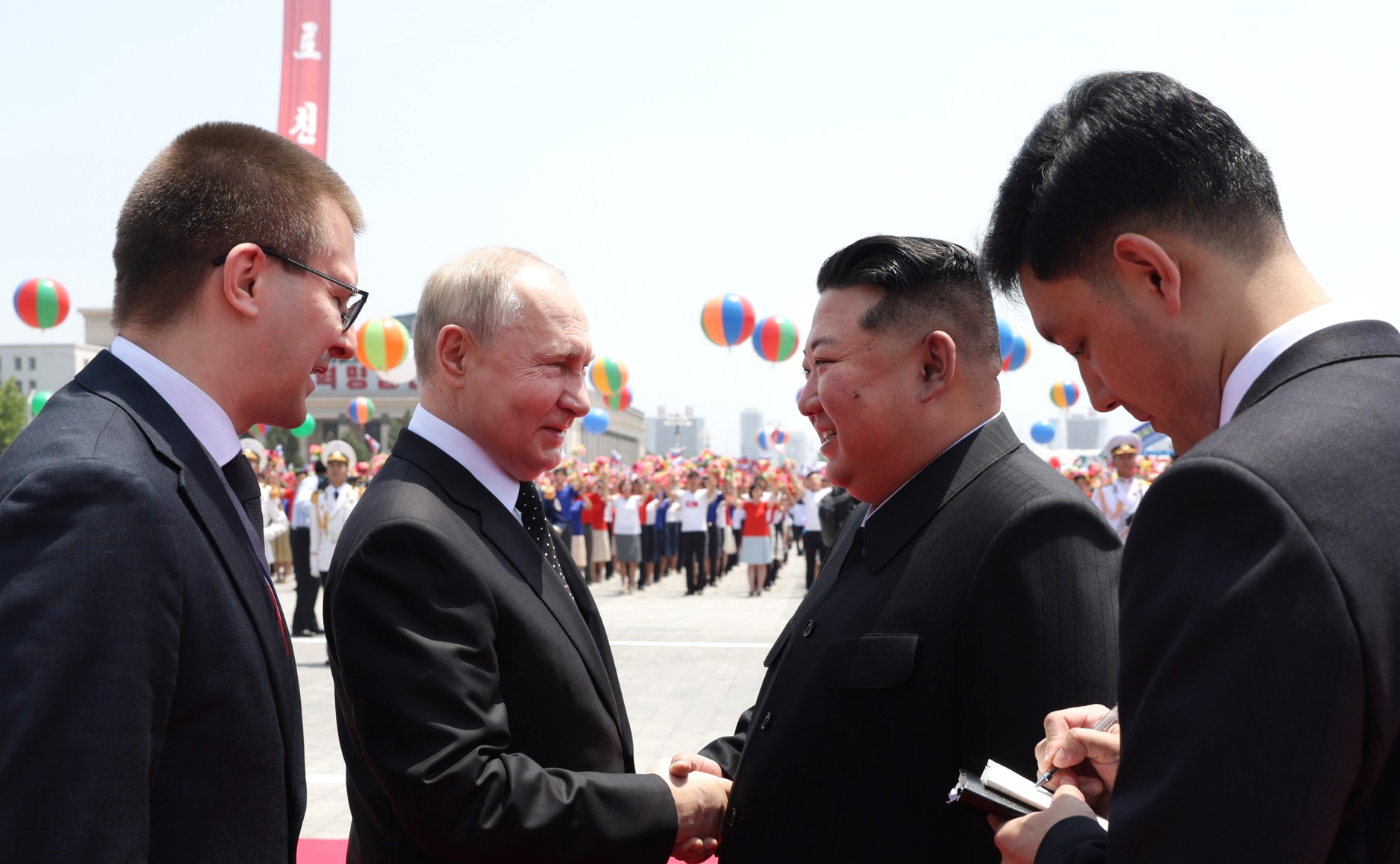
Vladimir Putin and Kim Jong Un in during the 2024 summit in Pyongyang, North Korea, 19 June 2024

In September 2023, Kim Jong Un visited Russia in his first foreign trip since 2019. The meeting lasted over four hours at the Vostochny Cosmodrome in the Amur Oblast, and was described as underpinning how the two countries' interests are aligning. Putin is widely suspected to be seeking North Korea's large stockpiles of aging ammunition and rockets from the Soviet era. During the meeting, Kim once again gave his support for Russia's “sacred fight” against the west, expressing his “...support for all the measures taken by the Russian government, and [he] takes this opportunity again to affirm that [he] will always be with Russia." When asked if Russia would help North Korea build satellites, presumably in return for ammunition, Putin said “that’s why [they] came here." Kim's trip to Russia was followed by a visit by Russian foreign minister Sergey Lavrov to Pyongyang in October, where he met with Kim. In March 2024, Russia vetoed a United Nations Security Council resolution that otherwise received 13 supports (France, United Kingdom, United States, Ecuador, Japan, Malta, Mozambique, Switzerland, Algeria, Guyana, South Korea, Sierra Leone and Slovenia) and 1 abstention (China) that would have renewed the mandate of the Panel of Experts that monitor sanctions compliance.

In June 2024, President Vladimir Putin visited North Korea for the first time since 2000, meeting with North Korean leader Kim Jong Un in Pyongyang. Putin expressed appreciation for North Korea's support of Russia's military actions in Ukraine and emphasized their mutual opposition to Western ambitions, while Kim Jong Un expressed "full support" for Russia's war in Ukraine and pledged stronger strategic ties with Moscow. The visit included several top Russian officials, and a number of agreements were signed, including the North Korean–Russian Treaty on Comprehensive Strategic Partnership. The partnership agreement pledged mutual aid and strengthening cooperation in security, trade, and cultural ties, including a mutual defence clause. This agreement signifies the closest Russia-North Korea relationship since the Soviet Union, with North Korea supporting Russia's actions in Ukraine and plans for military cooperation. In November 2024, Russia and North Korea formalized the agreement.

In November 2024, Kim Jong Un met with Russian Minister of Natural Resources Alexander Kozlov in Pyongyang to discuss expanding cooperation in trade, science, and technology. The meeting, part of the 11th intergovernmental cooperation committee, highlighted the growing ties between the two nations following a mutual defense pact signed in June 2024. In February 2025, Ri Hi Yong, a senior North Korean official and Politburo member, visited Russia, where he met with Vladimir Yakushev to sign a protocol on inter-party cooperation between United Russia and the Workers' Party of Korea. Ri also met with Russian President Vladimir Putin on 27 February to discuss ties. North Korea's KCNA reported that Putin praised Pyongyang's support for Russia and highlighted 2024 as a pivotal year for their relationship.

== Economic relations ==
After the Korean War, the Soviet Union emerged as the main trading partner and sponsor of North Korea. Ninety-three North Korean factories were built with Russian technical assistance, forging the country's heavy-industrial backbone. Soviet aid to the DPRK indeed expanded from 1965 to 1968, especially after Sino-North Korean relations soured during the Chinese Cultural Revolution. In 1988, at the peak of the bilateral relationship, about 60% of North Korea's trade was with the Soviet Union. Much of the trade was in raw materials and petroleum that Moscow provided to Pyongyang at concessional prices.

In response to the famine-stricken North Korea in the mid-1990s, Russia delivered humanitarian aid to North Korea twice in 1997: food and medicine worth 4.5 billion "old" rubles in the fall, and 370 tonnes of sugar, canned meat, fish and milk worth 3.5 billion rubles, in December. In 2008, Russia delivered oil and food to North Korea in accordance with its obligations outlined at the six-party talks.

In August 2011, ahead of Kim Jong Il's visit to Russia, the Kremlin said that it was providing food assistance including some 50,000 tons of wheat. A few days after Kim's visit the presidential envoy to Russia's Far East, Viktor Ishayev, said wheat deliveries would begin via the town border of Khasan in September. A week later a Russian economic delegation, led by Minister of Regional Development Viktor Basargin, was in North Korea to sign "a protocol of the 5th Meeting of the North Korea-Russia Intergovernmental Committee for Cooperation in Trade, Economy, Science and Technology". Also on same day, the North Korean premier, Choe Yong-rim, met with the Russian economic delegation at the Mansudae Assembly Hall in Pyongyang.

In 2011, it was reported that Russia would write off 90% of the North Korean debt and in return Russia would be allowed to invest in North Korean projects in the energy, health and education sectors, as reported in 2012. One of the major projects planned by Russia was to build a gas pipeline to energy-hungry South Korea through North Korea. The multi-billion-dollar project is, however, unlikely to be realized as North and South Korea are still de jure at war. On 18 September 2012, North Korea and Russia signed a deal to write off 90% debt owed by North Korea to Russia. It is estimated that North Korea owed about $11 billion. North Korea's debt was established during the existence of the Soviet Union when the Soviets made loans to North Korea. The negotiations concerning debt reduction were held earlier in 2012, while the deal was signed in Moscow. The $1 billion North Korea has to repay will be used to finance Russian investment in humanitarian and energy projects in North Korea. This agreement removed legal blocks hindering the financing of trade between the two countries. In April 2014, Russia wrote off 90% of North Korea's $11 billion of Soviet-era debt. On 5 May 2014, Russian President Vladimir Putin ratified an agreement to write off 90% of North Korea's debts after the State Duma passed the law on 18 April 2014 and the Federation Council approved it on 29 April 2014.

On 2 February 2012, the Interfax report further quoted the Russian ambassador to North Korea, Valery Sukhinin, as saying that Russia "did not rule out" the possibility of sending more humanitarian aid to North Korea, "depending on the situation there and taking into account our capabilities". Sukhinin went on to say that in 2011 Russia had provided North Korea with 50,000 tonnes of grain on a bilateral basis, as well as with $5 million worth of flour as part of the World Food Programme. In addition, 10,000 tonnes of grain were dispatched to North Korea by Gazprom. However, of the overall bilateral economic trade between Russia and North Korea, 80% consists of cooperation and investment between North Korean and Russian regional areas. The most active regions are Siberia and the Far East, mainly the Kemerovo, Magadan and Primorski regions.

In June 2014 Russia and North Korea have agreed to settlements in rubles in all trade between the two countries. The first transactions in rubles between Russia and North Korea were carried out in October 2014. In March 2015, a Russian official said Moscow and Pyongyang have agreed to discuss the creation of advanced development zones (ru:территория опережающего развития) in Russia's Far East and North Korea.

Since the start of Russia's full-scale invasion of Ukraine, Russia has increasingly relied on North Korean labour to address acute workforce shortages caused by the war. In September 2022, Russian Deputy Prime Minister Marat Khusnullin said they were "working on political arrangements" to employ North Korean workers in Russia, possibly 20,000 to 50,000 to develop the infrastructure in the Russian Far East. Intelligence sources in South Korea estimate that over 10,000 North Korean workers were sent to Russia in 2024, with the total expected to exceed 50,000. Deployment to Russia is viewed within North Korea as a rare chance to earn higher pay than available domestically, with many selected workers hoping to improve their families' living standards. Many of these individuals are assigned to large construction projects, as well as factories and IT facilities, in violation of United Nations sanctions banning the use of North Korean labour abroad. Official Russian data show a sharp rise in North Korean arrivals, with thousands entering on student visas to circumvent restrictions. Multiple escapees described to BBC the slave like conditions of long working hours, often exceeding 18 hours per day, with minimal rest days, inadequate safety equipment, and unsafe living conditions. Workers are closely monitored by North Korean security agents, confined to worksites, and housed in overcrowded, unsanitary accommodations such as shipping containers or unfinished buildings. Injuries often go untreated, and wages are largely withheld until return to North Korea, with most earnings transferred to the state as "loyalty fees".

In August 2024 Russia sent 447 goats to North Korea. The goats will provide dairy products to local children to relieve North Korea's food shortages. That was part of the agreement from the summit in June 2024, where they agreed to exchange weapons for food. On 28 July 2025, the first commercial flight between the two countries in decades was launched from Moscow to Pyongyang.

== Military relations ==
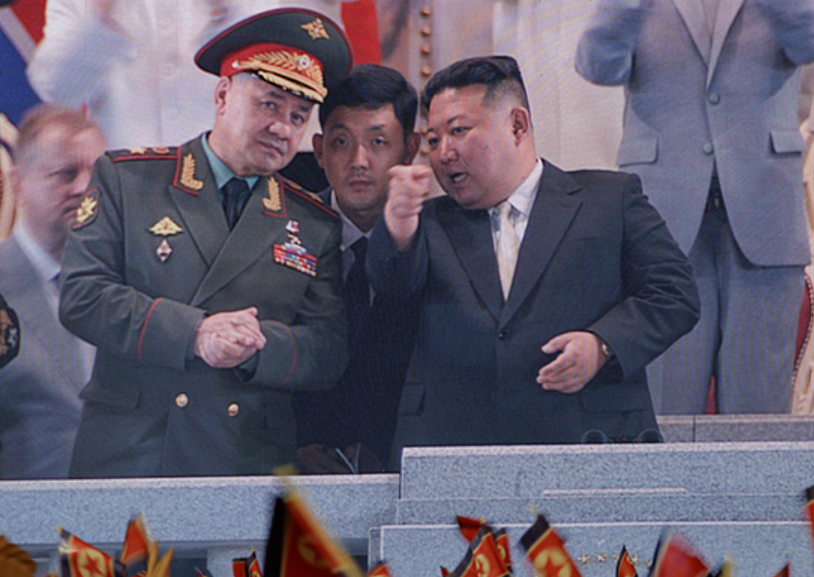
Former Russian Minister of Defence Sergei Shoigu with Kim Jong-un during the ceremonies marking the 70th anniversary of the end of the Korean War, in Pyongyang (2023)

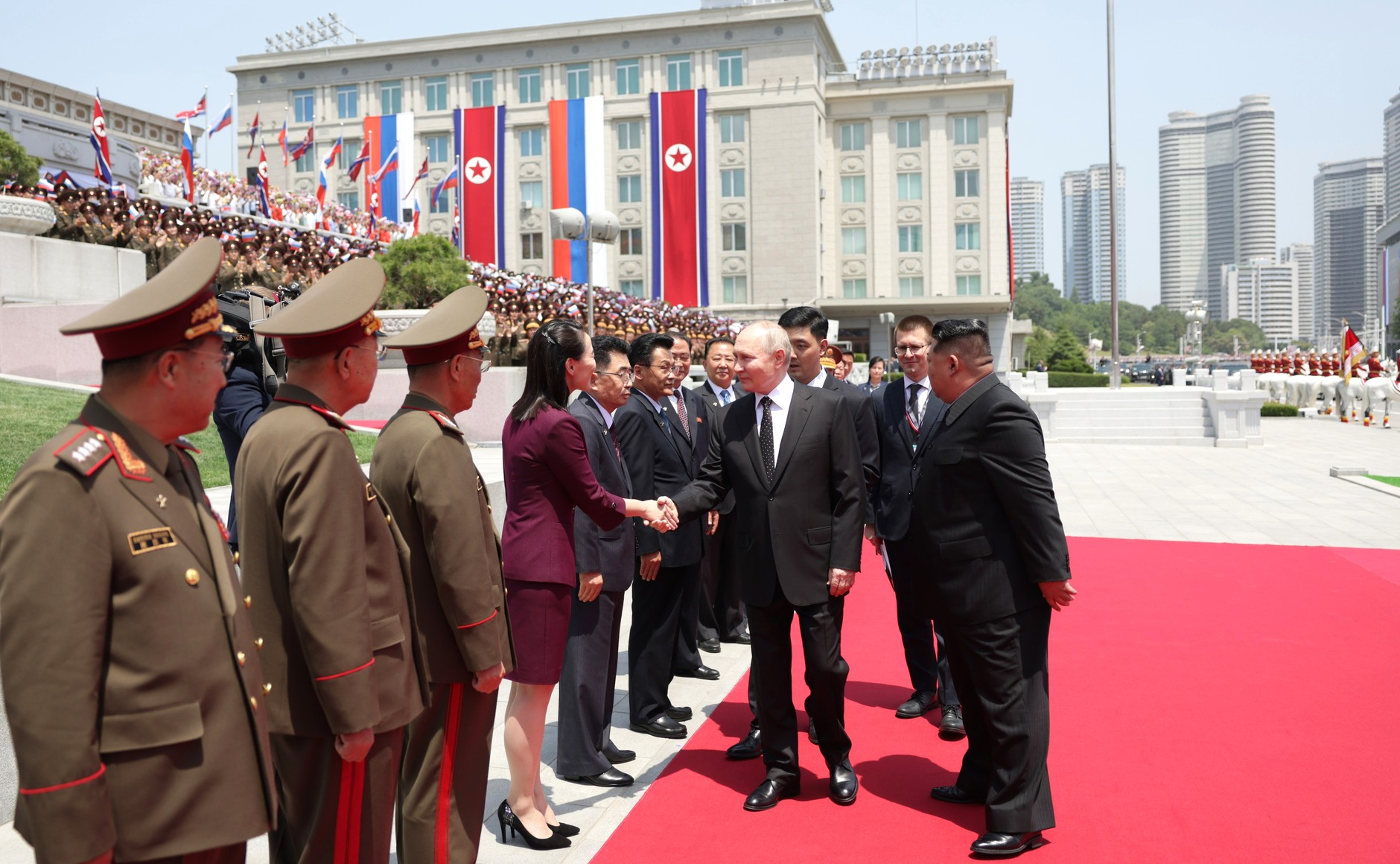
Kim and Putin in Pyongyang, North Korea during the 2024 North Korea–Russia summit, June 2024

On April 26–28, 2001, North Korean Defense Minister Vice-Marshal Kim Il-chol visited Moscow, and a deal on bilateral cooperation in the defense industry and military equipment was signed between him and Deputy Prime Minister Ilya Klebanov. During Kim's visit, the two governments also signed a so-called "framework of intergovernmental agreement on cooperation in the military industry" and a deal between the two defense ministries.

In October 2002, a delegation from the DPRK's Ministry of People's Armed Forces, headed by the Deputy Chief of the Ministry of People's Military Lee Men-su, visited Russia. At the beginning of November that year a delegation from the Korean People's Air Force, headed by its commander Oh Kum-chul, visited Russia.

In November 2015, the head of the Russian delegation to Pyongyang, Colonel General Nikolay Bogdanovsky, and the Vice Chief of the Korean People's Army O Kum-chol signed an agreement on preventing dangerous military activities.

=== Russo-Ukrainian war ===
In August, the New York Post reported that North Korea had offered 100,000 troops to help Donbas during the Russia's invasion of Ukraine, though the Russian foreign ministry said this speculation was "completely fake". In September 2022, The New York Times reported that Russia was buying millions of artillery shells and rockets from North Korea due to the sanctions caused by Russia's invasion, citing U.S. intelligence officials. Both Russia and North Korea denied this. In December 2022, a senior US official said he can "confirm" that Russia's Wagner Group took a delivery of an arms shipment from North Korea to help bolster Russian forces in Ukraine.

In July 2023, Russian Minister of Defense Sergei Shoigu and a Chinese delegation led by Communist Party Politburo member Li Hongzhong arrived in North Korea for the 70th anniversary of the end of the Korean War. Shoigu met with North Korean leader Kim Jong-un and North Korean Defense Minister Kang Sun-nam. In January 2024, officials in Kyiv and Washington D.C said that Russia had begun using North Korean missiles in its attacks in Ukraine.

In June 2024 the Port of Najin and the Port of Dunay were linked by a new shipping route because of the Russian invasion of Ukraine made it profitable for North Korea to ship arms (chiefly artillery shells) to the AFRF. Shin Wonsik, Defense Minister of South Korea, alleged that staff at his ministry had detected "at least 10,000 shipping containers" shipped from North Korea to Russia. In July 2024, a DPRK weapons system which includes the Bulsae-4 ATGM was seen to destroy a British-supplied AS-90 self-propelled artillery system in the Kharkiv region of Ukraine. According to at least one observer, "the identification of the first North Korean vehicle in Ukraine marked a turning point in Pyongyang's involvement in the conflict." It was alleged by another report that a non-monetary swap of DPRK guns for Russian food was seen to have occurred in July 2024.

In October 2024, NATO stated that North Korean troops have been sent to Russia and North Korean military units have been deployed in the Kursk area. While it was unconfirmed, North Korea is said to have decided to send around 12,000 troops, including special forces, to support Russia in the Ukraine conflict, including around 500 officers and three generals. On 28 April 2025, the North Korean government confirmed the deployment of 14,000 troops to the Russian front in Ukraine. Though estimates vary, the United Kingdom has estimated that DPRK forces have suffered more than 6,000 killed and wounded as of June 2025.

On 24 April 2025, according to Ukraine's Air force, in the early hours of Thursday morning Russia launched 11 Iskander ballistic missiles, 37 KH-101 cruise missiles, six Iskander-K cruise missiles, 12 Kalibr cruise missiles, 4 KH-59/KH-69 missiles and 145 drones. At least one of the Iskander-type missiles is claimed to be North Korean-manufactured Hwasong-11A (KN-23), according to Ukrainian President Volodymyr Zelenskyy.

== Nuclear program ==
In March 1994 during the first North Korean nuclear crisis, Russia, emphasizing its position as a member of Northeast Asia, proposed the eight-party talks, which included participants from North and South Korea, Russia, the U.S., China, Japan, the IAEA and the UN Secretary General. From 2003 onward both states participated in the Six-party talks. In July 2006 Russia supported United Nations Security Council Resolution 1695, condemning the 2006 North Korean missile test. In October 2006, Russia voted for Resolution 1718 imposing an embargo on technologies supporting missile and nuclear programs, as well as luxury goods. As a result, North Korea has been under to a UN arms embargo, as part of Security Council resolutions - with the support of Russia, which holds veto power.

After the North Korean nuclear test on 25 May 2009, North Korea's relations with China and Russia changed. The Russian Foreign Ministry issued a sharp note of condemnation; The statement called the test a "violation" of previous Security Council resolutions and a "serious blow" to the nuclear nonproliferation regime. It also complained that "the latest DPRK moves are provoking an escalation of tension in Northeast Asia." Russia, fearing that North Korea's success could lead to a nuclear war, joined China, France, Japan, South Korea, United Kingdom and the United States in starting a resolution that could include new sanctions. The Russian news agencies were outraged when North Korea threatened to attack neighboring South Korea after it joined a U.S. led plan to check vessels suspected of carrying equipment for weapons of mass destruction. Another concern was that the nuclear test can be a threat to the security of Russia's far east regions which border North Korea. South Korean president Lee Myung-bak had a phone conversation with Russian president Dmitry Medvedev, where Medvedev told him that Russia would work with Seoul on a new U.N. Security Council resolution and to revive international talks on the North Korean nuclear issue.

On 15 June 2009, China and Russia supported the UN sanctions on North Korea. However, the two countries stressed that they did not support the use of force. Permanent Representative of Russia to the United Nations Vitaly Churkin insisted that any sanctions should be lifted once North Korea cooperates. In June 2009, President Dmitry Medvedev supported more intense sanctions and deployed a S-400 air defense system to their border. Also, On 30 March 2010, President Dmitry Medvedev signed a decree implementing intensified United Nations Security Council sanctions against Pyongyang's nuclear programs. The presidential decree banned the purchase of weapons and relevant materials from the DPRK by government offices, enterprises, banks, organizations and individuals currently under Russia's jurisdiction. It also prohibited the transit of weapons and relevant materials via Russian territory or their export to the DPRK. Any financial aid and educational training that might facilitate North Korea's nuclear program and proliferation activities were also forbidden.

In 2012, following the North Korean announcement that it agreed to introduce a moratorium on nuclear tests, long-range missile launches and uranium enrichment, Russia's foreign ministry said, "We welcome North Korea's decision to impose a moratorium on testing nuclear weapons and launching long-range ballistic missiles, and enriching uranium". North Korea under Kim Jong Un continued to defy the international community in relation to its nuclear and rocket programme. In 2013, Russia supported both resolutions of the UN Security Council against North Korea for its missile and nuclear tests. North Korea advised foreign embassies that the North Korean government could not guarantee their safety in an event of conflict and advised the foreign embassies to reconsider their evacuation plans. In December 2013 Russia joined the sanctions against North Korea, introduced in March by the UN Security Council (Resolution 2087). The corresponding decree signed by President Putin specified that Russian companies were prohibited to provide North Korea any technical assistance and advice in the development and production of ballistic missiles. In addition, North Korean naval vessels to call at Russian ports would be required to undergo inspection. Also, the authorities ordered to be vigilant when dealing with North Korean diplomats.

In March 2016, following the January 2016 North Korean nuclear test, Russia supported a U.N. Security Council resolution regarding the introduction of further sanctions against North Korea. Russian presidential press secretary Dmitry Peskov said "the Kremlin is concerned over North Korea's statements about its readiness to use nuclear forces and urges all states to display restraint", in response to Kim Jong Un's orders to the military to deploy the nuclear warheads so they can be fired at "any moment" and be prepared to launch preemptive attacks against its enemies. In May 2016 the Central Bank of Russia ordered all Russian banks to halt financial dealings with North Korean agencies, organizations and individuals on the UN Security Council sanctions list. The move was in line with the United Nations Security Council resolution adopted in early March to penalize North Korea for its fourth nuclear test and long-range missile launch and curb its weapons of mass destruction program.

Russia's position regarding North Korea's nuclear program changed after the 2022 invasion of Ukraine. In September 2024, Russian Foreign Minister Sergey Lavrov said that Russia viewed the notion of denuclearizing North Korea as a "closed issue", saying that Russia understood North Korea's logic of relying on nuclear weapons against the United States. In July 2025, Lavrov said that Russia "respect[s] North Korea’s aspirations and understand[s] the reasons why it is pursuing nuclear development". In February 2026, Lavrov said that "The main guarantee of prosperity in the modern world … is, however sad it may be to acknowledge, Pyongyang’s possession of nuclear weapons" and opposed denuclearization due to South Korea's "actively expanding military … cooperation" with the United States, with Japan possibly joining them. In July 2026, Lavrov said that "The Russian side clearly reaffirmed its full support" for North Korea to improve its "defense capabilities", and that because of U.S. and South Korea's "intensive military exercises" that include a "nuclear component" around North Korea, "Russia will no longer support calls for the denuclearization of the Korean Peninsula". He said these "aggressive maneuvers around the DPRK are openly aimed at containing the country or even provoking it into taking some form of military action". Regarding nuclear weapons, he said "Our North Korean friends and allies see no other way to protect their sovereignty", and added "It is noteworthy that the term ‘denuclearization’ was agreed upon and approved in the mid-2010s as a goal to be pursued with regard to the entire Korean Peninsula" and continued "Now, however, Seoul, Tokyo and some U.S. politicians speak of the denuclearization of the DPRK rather than the entire Korean Peninsula".

== Security relations ==
On 22 July 2024, Russian Prosecutor General Igor Krasnov and North Korean Central Prosecutors' Office Head Kim Chol Won signed a joint cooperation agreement in Pyongyang that covered legal assistance, cooperation of law enforcement in criminal cases as well as crimes in cyberspace and the environment. On 21 October 2026, Russian Prosecutor General Aleksandr Gutsan and Central Prosecutors' Office Head Kim Chol Won signed an agreement in Moscow that upgrades the 2024 agreement, covering combating terrorism, smuggling and cybercrime.

== Border ==
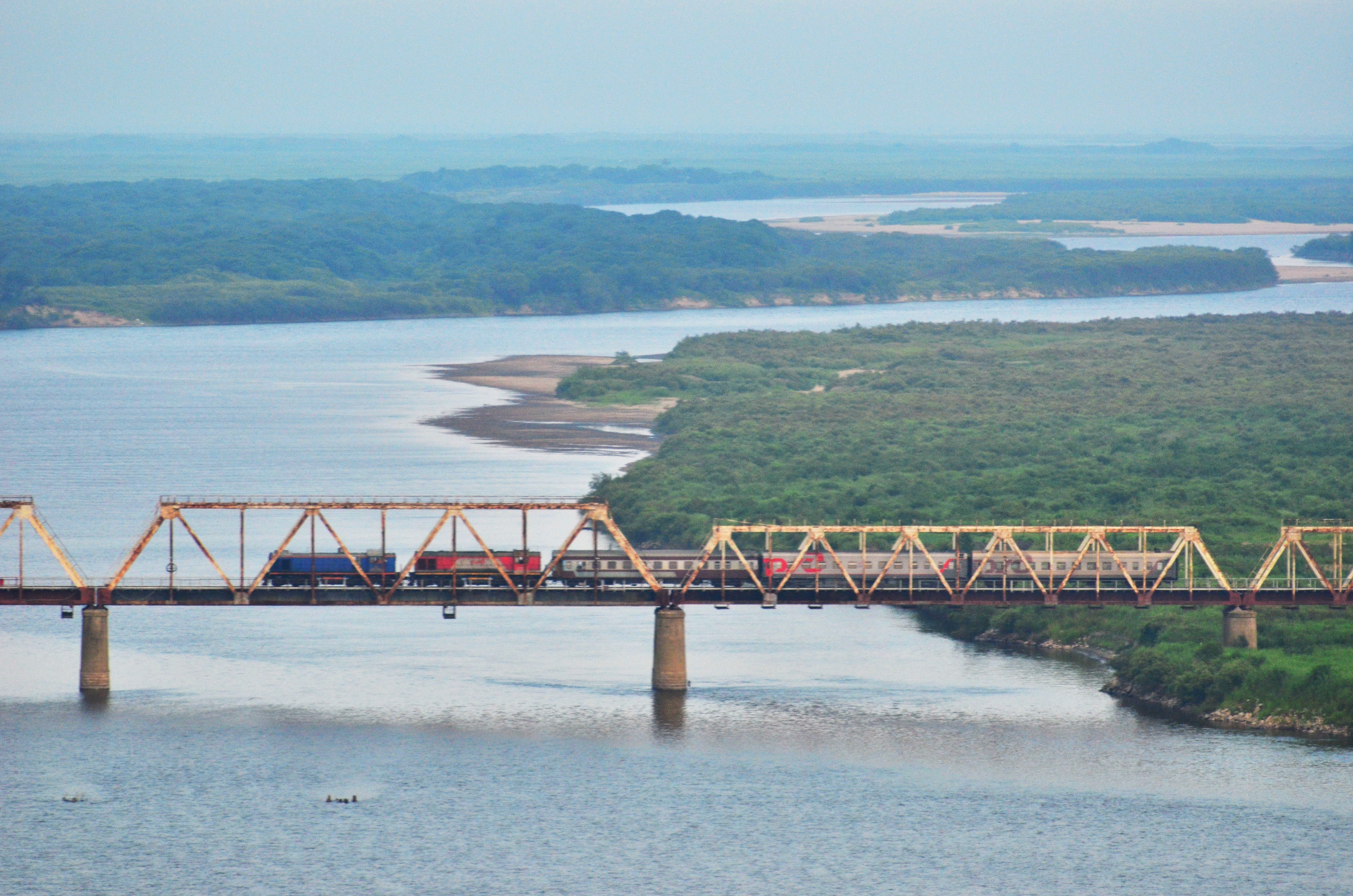
The Friendship Bridge linking North Korea and Russia

The two states share a border along the lower Tumen River, which is 17 kilometers (11 mi) long and was formed in 1860 when Tsar Alexander II acquired Ussuriland from Qing dynasty China in the Convention of Peking. The border area is mostly plain, with few mountains. An important natural landmark is Lake Khasan, which was the location of the Battle of Lake Khasan. Other landmarks include Zaozyornaya Hill (Russian: сопка Заозёрная), and Gora Priozernaya (Russian: Гора Приозерная). On the Russian side stands a building called "Korean-Russian House of Friendship" (Russian: Дом корейско-российской дружбы). Furugelm Island, the southernmost point in Asian Russia, is located close to the maritime border. On February 1, 2025, Russian Prime Minister Mikhail Mishustin signed government decree no. 157 on the construction of a road bridge between the two countries. On April 21, 2026, both sides of the road bridge has been successfully connected, and the bridge opened on September 7. Oleg Kozhemyako, governor of Russia's Primorsky region, stated that the bridge would increase trade, expand cultural and tourism ties, and cut the distance between Vladivostok and the North Korean border city of Rason to 320 kilometres.

== Public opinion ==
According to a 2016 BBC World Service Poll, 28% of Russians view North Korea's influence positively, with 21% expressing a negative view.

According to a May 2025 poll by the Levada Center, 30% of Russians consider North Korea to be among Russia's closest friends and allies.

== See also ==
- Foreign relations of Russia
- Foreign relations of North Korea
- Russia–South Korea relations
