= 2023 visit by Kim Jong Un to Russia =

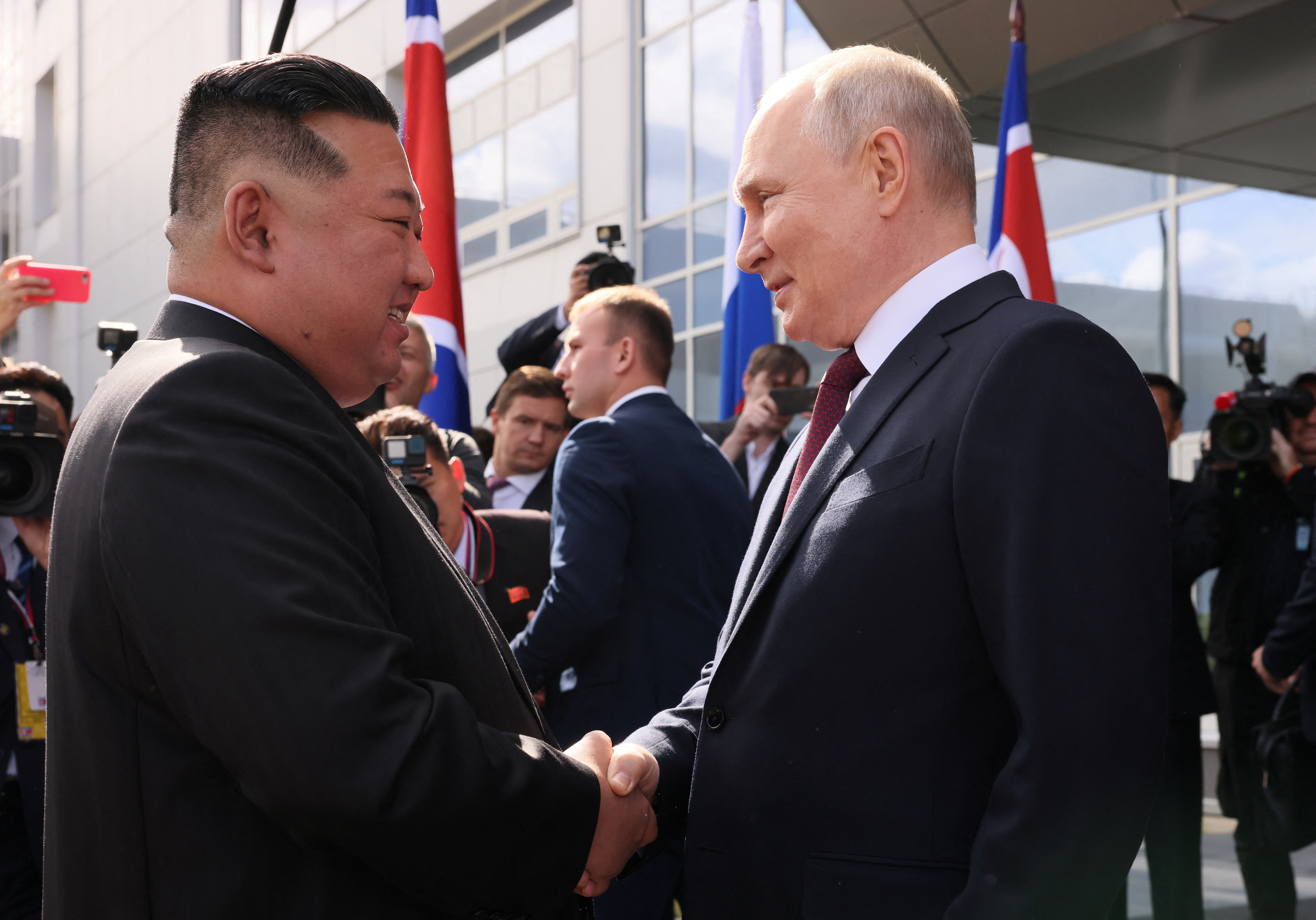
- Kim Jong Un and Vladimir Putin meeting at Vostochny Cosmodrome in Amur Oblast, Russia (13 September 2023)
- Date: September 12–17, 2023
- Location: Vostochny Cosmodrome, Tsiolkovsky, Amur Oblast, Russia
- Participants: (Russia) Vladimir Putin (President) (North Korea) Kim Jong Un (General Secretary & President of the State Affairs)

On 12–17 September, 2023, Kim Jong Un, the general secretary of the Workers' Party of Korea and the president of the State Affairs Commission, visited Russia. This was Kim's first official visit overseas since the start of the COVID-19 pandemic in North Korea in 2020, and came after North Korea–Russia relations improved significantly following the 2022 Russian invasion of Ukraine.

Kim Jong Un departed from Pyongyang in his personal armoured train on 10 September and arrived at Khasan, Primorsky Krai on 12 September. He arrived at the Vostochny Cosmodrome on 13 September, where he held a summit meeting with Russian President Vladimir Putin on 13 September 2023. Kim announced North Korea's full support for Russia in the Russo-Ukrainian war during the meeting, while Putin praised the relationship between the two nations.

Following the summit, Kim continued his visit in Russia, arrriving in Komsomolsk-on-Amur on 15 September, where he inspected the Gagarin Aircraft Plant. The following day, Kim conducted a visit of Vladivostok, where he met with Russian Defense Minister Sergei Shoigu and visited the Vladivostok International Airport and the Mariinsky Theater. On 17 September, he visited Far Eastern Federal University, the Primorsky Oceanarium and Primorsky Pavilion at the Far East Street exhibition. He concluded his visit on the same day. and returned to North Korea

== Background ==
In September 2023, the Russo-Ukrainian war was leading to ammunition shortages in Russia. At the same time, the Ukrainian Armed Forces were launching a counter-offensive, and North Korean weapons helped Russia slow down the advance of the Ukrainian army. Russia has also faced severe labor shortages and lack of international support. There was speculation that the meeting was to centre around the possibility of Russia receiving large amounts of North Korean ammunition stockpiles from the Soviet era, in exchange for Russian help in developing technology and resource aid. North Korea maintained a large stockpile of Soviet-style artillery shells and developed the industrial capacity to produce such shells. However, the quality of North Korean shells was noted to be not high: 20% of the shells failed to explode during North Korea’s large-scale shelling of South Korea in 2010. In addition to shells, North Korea could also supply missiles and howitzers. Russia was also speculated wanting to obtain from North Korea parts for old Soviet-era tanks used during the invasion of Ukraine, as well as shells and missiles compatible with Russian weapon systems. These include ballistic missiles that North Korea has test-fired in recent years. (Note: Observers noted that North Korea conducted two ballistic missile launches on the day of the negotiations.)

North Korea has been subject to a number of international sanctions due to its nuclear weapons program. The United Nations Security Council imposed the most severe sanctions on North Korea from August to September 2017. Siemon T. Wezeman, an expert at the Stockholm International Peace Research Institute, stated that Russia’s purchase of weapons from North Korea violated international law, including UN Security Council Resolution 1874 of June 2009. In 2009, Russia had joined the sanctions against North Korea because North Korea violated the nuclear nonproliferation regime. North Korea was speculated to be interested in acquiring space technology from Russia that could improve the range, accuracy, and reliability of ballistic missiles with nuclear warheads. According to The Economist, indirect evidence of this included the choice of the two sides to meet at the Vostok Cosmodrome. The magazine believes that Kim Jong Un is also interested in submarine manufacturing technology. It adds that North Korea is interested in food, electricity, and currency. According to journalists, Russia may invite North Korean laborers to participate in construction and logging work.

== The visit ==
=== Preparations ===
Russian defence minister Sergei Shoigu attended official celebrations of the 70th anniversary of "Victory Day" in Pyongyang at the end of July 2023. Shoigu announced the strengthening of military ties between North Korea and the Russian Federation, calling North Korea an "important partner" of Russia. In early September 2023, it was reported by The New York Times that North Korean leader Kim Jong Un would be visiting Russia sometime that month. On 10 September, the meeting was confirmed by both sides after Kim Jong Un departed Pyongyang with his personal armoured train that he had previously used to visit Russia in 2019. The train traveled at 60 km/h.

The Korean Central News Agency said the purpose of the visit was to "elevate the friendly and cooperative relations between North Korea and Russia to a new level". It was reported that the meeting between the two heads of state would focus on Russia’s acquisition of a large amount of Soviet-era ammunition from North Korea in exchange for Russia’s assistance in developing military reconnaissance satellites and providing food aid. The North Korean delegation included Foreign Minister Choe Son-hui and Defense Minister Kang Sun-nam, as well as senior officials from the military industry, diplomacy and military sectors. Other officials in the delegation including Central Military Commission Vice Chairman Ri Pyong-chol, missile development officials Kim Jong-sik and Jang Chang-ha, Marshal Pak Jong-chon, Pak Thae-song, Jo Chun-ryong, O Su-yong, and Pak Hun, as well as Kim Jong Un's sister Kim Yo Jong. According to Record, Kim Jong Un may have had as many as 120 bodyguards. For Kim, this was his first overseas trip since 2019 and his 10th overseas trip since taking office.

=== The summit ===
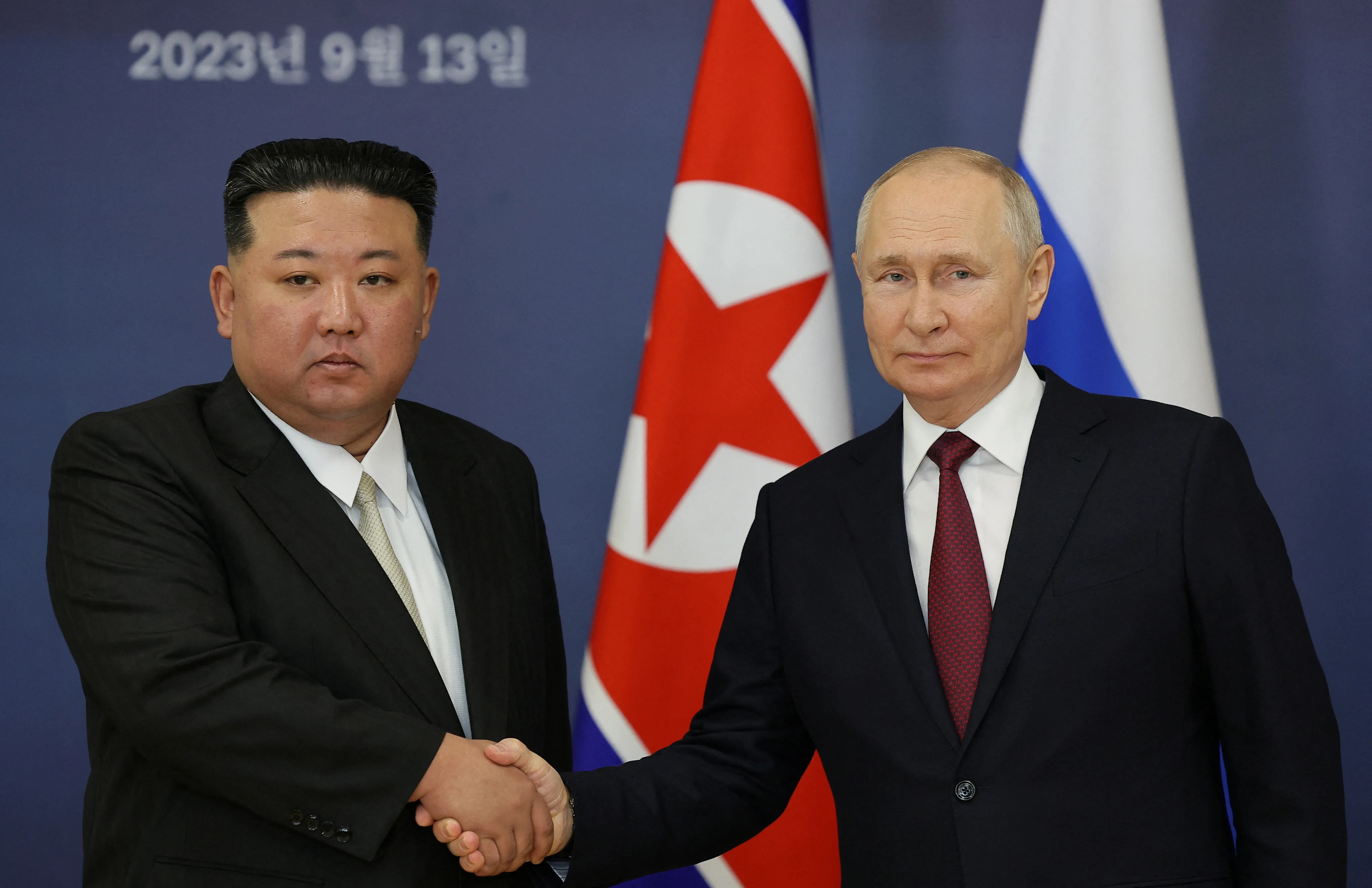
Putin and Kim handshaking prior to their meeting

Kim Jong Un arrived in the North Korean leaders' train in Khasan, Primorsky Krai, Russia on 12 September. He was greeted by a military band and Minister of National Resources and Environment Alexander Kozlov and Primorsky Krai governor Oleg Kozhemyako, at the Khasan railway station, Russia’s only settlement bordering North Korea. Kozhemyako said that "in the near future," the two countries could cooperate on projects in tourism, agriculture, and construction. Kim then left, and continued, arriving at the Vostochny Cosmodrome on 13 September. On that day, Russian President Vladimir Putin flew to Amur Oblast after attending the Eastern Economic Forum in Vladivostok. Hours before his meeting with Kim Jong Un began, Ukraine bombed the Black Sea Fleet in Sevastopol, damaging several warships, but Putin did not publicly mention the attack during the meeting.

Kim Jong Un met with Putin at the Vostochny Cosmodrome, 1,300 kilometers from the Russian-North Korean border. The meeting between the two leaders began at the assembly and testing building at the cosmodrome, where the Angara rocket was being assembled. They also showed Kim the joint launch pad for the Angara and Soyuz-2 rockets. During the visit, Kim asked many technical questions, and he was particularly interested in the properties of the rocket fuel. Russian Deputy Prime Minister Yury Borisov, who is in charge of Russian spaceflight, and Nikolai Nesterchuk, General Manager of the Ground Space Infrastructure Operations Center, answered his questions. Putin also showed Kim Jong Un his fleet of Orus brand cars.

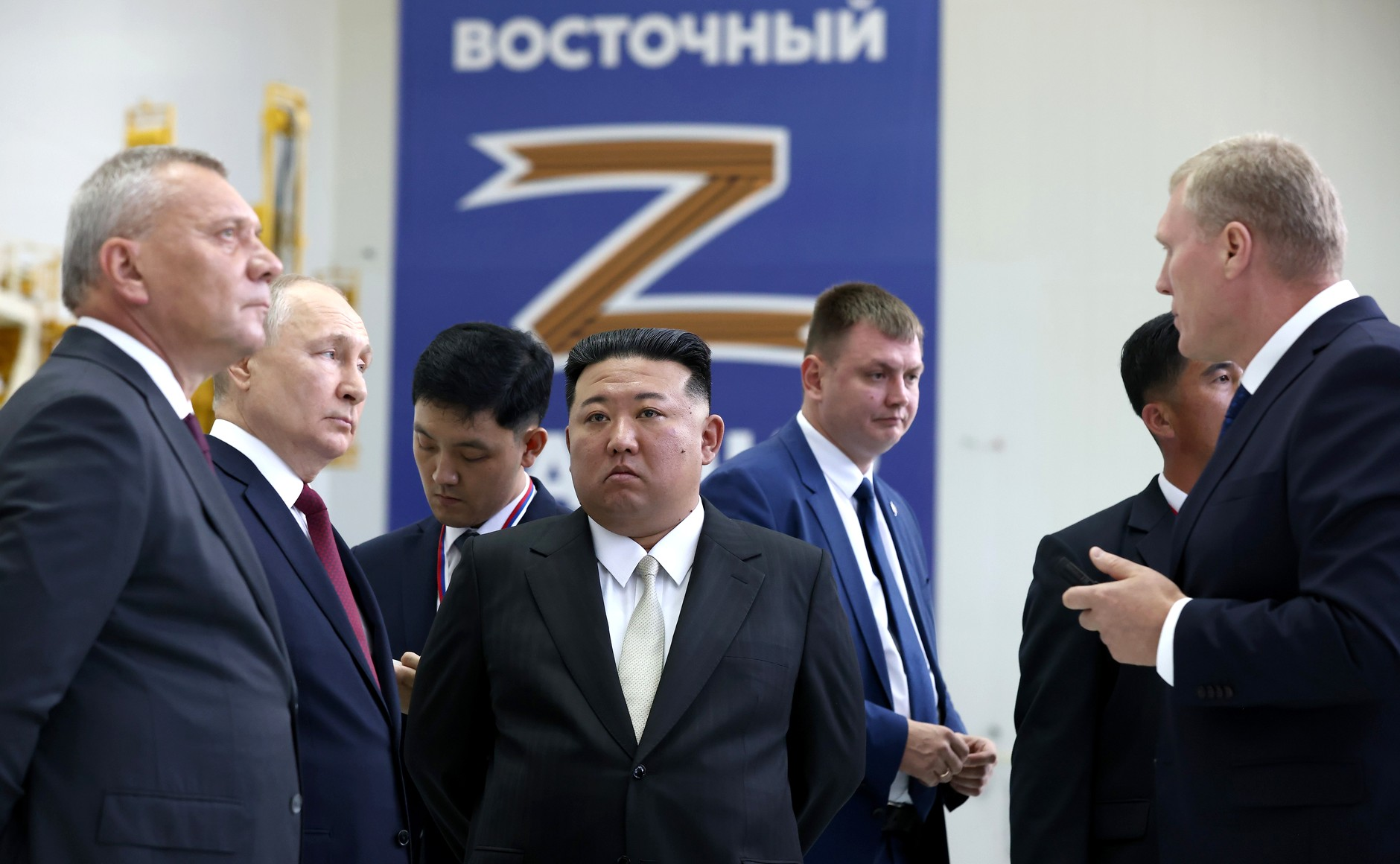
Kim Jong un and Vladimir Putin at Vostochny Cosmodrome, September 2023

After the visit, Putin and Kim held talks. The two-hour meeting was held behind closed doors. The talks began with a delegation meeting, which included Russian Foreign Minister Sergey Lavrov and Russian Defense Minister Sergei Shoigu, followed by a private meeting between Putin and Kim Jong Un. The Kremlin press service said no press release would be issued. The meeting did not reveal any information about North Korea's arms supply to Russia. However, Kim Jong Un explicitly supported Russia's invasion of Ukraine. During the meeting, Kim once again gave his support for Russia's "sacred fight" against the West, expressing his "...support for all the measures taken by the Russian government, and [he] takes this opportunity again to affirm that [he] will always be with Russia." Kim Jong Un said, "I hope we will always stand together against imperialism and build a sovereign state."

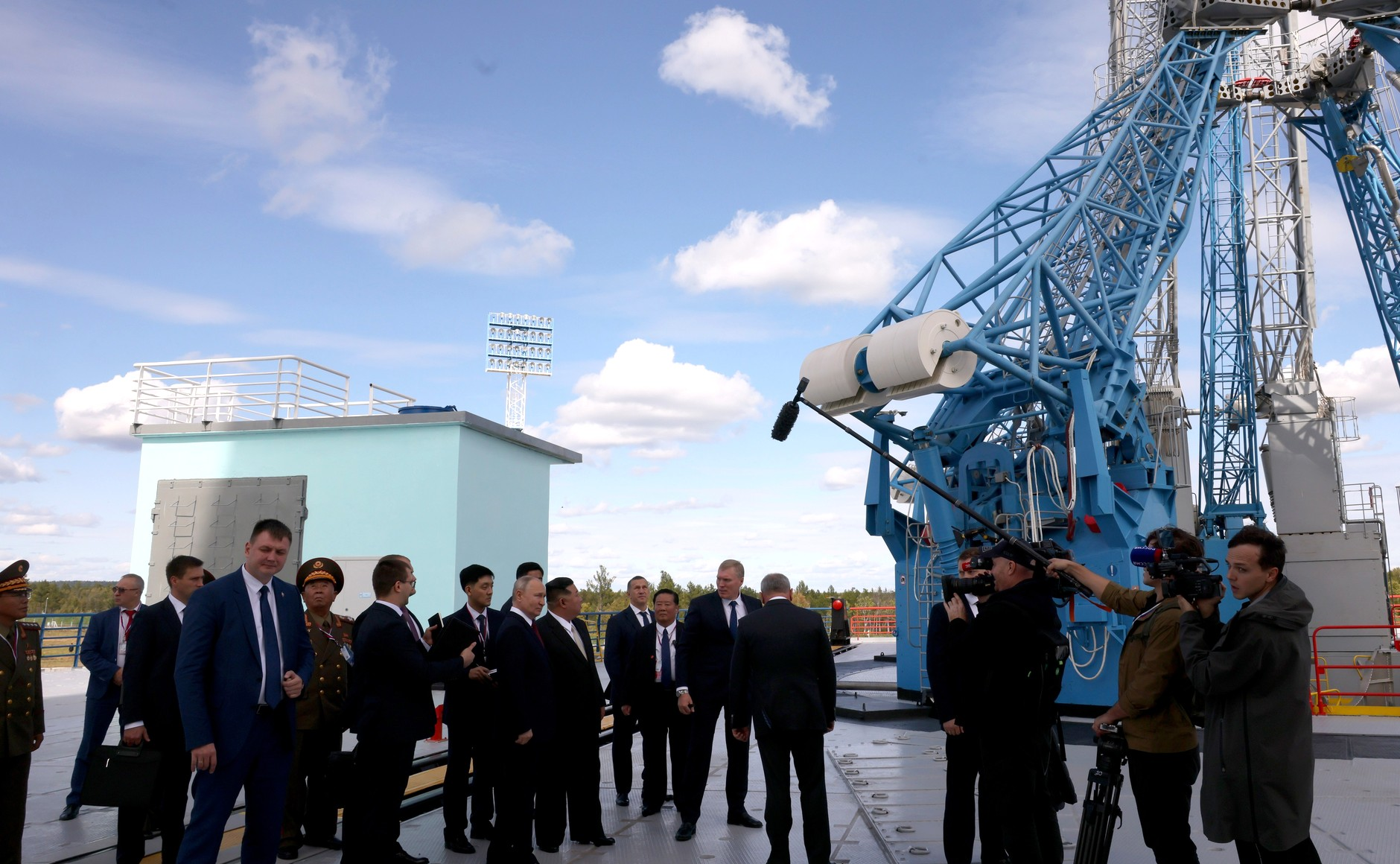
Vladimir Putin and Kim Jong Un during the joint visit to the Vostochny Cosmodrome

During the dinner, Kim raised his glass to "the heroic Russian army and people, gloriously inheriting the tradition of victory and firmly demonstrating their priceless virtues and honors on the front of self-defense and in building a strong nation". Kim Jong Un wished "the Russian army and people" a "great victory" in "the sacred struggle to punish those evil forces that attempt to dominate and harbor expansionist fantasies". Putin recalled that in 1945 "Soviet and Korean soldiers fought shoulder to shoulder to defeat Japanese militarists " and claimed that Russia and Korea were "acting for peace and stability". When asked if Russia would help North Korea build satellites, Putin said "that's why [they] came here." At the same time, Putin did not mention the concerns of the United States and its Asian allies about North Korea’s missile program. During the meeting, Putin reminded that the Soviet Union was the first country to recognize North Korea and called the 70th anniversary of its victory in the "war of independence" of great significance.

According to Kremlin press secretary Dmitry Peskov, Russia and North Korea did not discuss the deployment of North Korean soldiers on the Ukrainian border. Peskov said that Kim Jong Un invited Putin to visit North Korea, and the Russian president "gratefully" agreed. Kim Jong Un gave Putin a North Korean-made carbine, while Putin gave Kim Jong Un a Russian carbine and a spacesuit glove that had been to space many times.

=== Subsequent visits ===
On 15 September, as part of his multi-day visit to Russia, Kim Jong Un arrived in Komsomolsk-on-Amur, where he was welcomed by Khabarovsk Krai Governor Mikhail Degtyarev and Komsomolsk-on-Amur Mayor Alexander Zonnik. Kim visited the Gagarin Aircraft Plant in Komsomolsk-on-Amur, which produces Su-35 fighter jets, where he inspected the assembly rooms for Su-35 and Su-57 fighter jets as well as Su-35 Superjet 100. Kim Jong Un also watched a demonstration flight of the Su-35 fighter jet.

On 16 September, Kim arrived in Vladivostok and then went to Vladivostok International Airport, where he met with Russian Defense Minister Sergei Shoigu. The two inspected Tu-160, Tu-95MS and Tu-22M3 missile bombers there. The authorities also showed Kim Jong Un the Kinzhal missile mounted on a MiG-31I fighter jet. In addition, Kim Jong Un inspected the Tupolev Tu-204 passenger plane. Kim Jong Un and Shoigu then visited the Russian frigate Marshal Shaposhnikov, where they inspected the Kalibr and Uran missile systems as well as the A-190 gun. At the station, children dressed in Soviet-era school uniforms greeted Kim Jong Un, while Primorsky Krai Governor Oleg Kozhemyako suggested sending Russian children to summer camps in North Korea. On the evening of 16 September, Kim Jong Un visited the Mariinsky Theater in Vladivostok, where he watched Pyotr Ilyich Tchaikovsky's The Sleeping Beauty.

On 17 September, Kim Jong Un visited the Far Eastern Federal University on Russky Island, accompanied by Russian Minister of Natural Resources and Environmental Protection Alexander Kozlov and University Rector Boris Korobets. Kim Jong Un also visited the Primorsky Oceanarium. He also visited the Primorsky Pavilion at the Far East Street exhibition, part of the Far Eastern Economic Forum, which showcases the achievements of the Russian Far East. The Primorsky Krai Governor Oleg Kozhemyako, said that they introduced Kim Jong Un to military and dual-use products produced in the Primorsky Krai, including samples of uniforms made of infrared-reflective fabric to make soldiers harder to spot on thermal imagers; samples of personal body armor; various drones and control systems; and tracked transport platforms for transporting ammunition and evacuating the wounded on the battlefield. They also gave some of these samples to Kim Jong Un as gifts. On 17 September, Kim Jong Un returned to North Korea after concluding his visit.

== International reactions ==
- Belarus: On 15 September, Russian President Vladimir Putin met with Belarusian President Alexander Lukashenko in Sochi. Lukashenko told Putin, "It is a pleasure to see you with Kim Jong Un," and suggested that they consider "trilateral cooperation" pact with Russia and North Korea.
- China: Mao Ning, spokesperson for the Ministry of Foreign Affairs, said: "The visit of the DPRK leader to Russia is a matter between their two countries and concerns the DPRK–Russia relationship. As far as China–DPRK relations are concerned, we are friendly neighbors. Our bilateral relations are making significant progress. Both sides are working hard to promote important consensus between the two countries' top leaders.
- South Korea: South Korean Unification Minister Kim Yung-ho expressed concern about military cooperation between North Korea and Russia. On 19 September, the Ministry of Foreign Affairs summoned Russian Ambassador to South Korea Andrei Kulik and demanded that Russia immediately suspend all military cooperation with North Korea.
- United States: U.S. government officials expressed concern with the visit, already seeing North Korea's open support for Russia, and warned that a circumvention of sanctions in the context of military support in the Russian invasion of Ukraine would prompt the United States to identify the methods used to "at least limit their ability to be effective". The U.S. also said it was prepared to impose new sanctions if North Korea began supplying weapons to Russia. U.S. National Security Advisor Jake Sullivan said Washington would work with South Korea and Japan to stop military cooperation between North Korea and Russia, and that the United States called on China to "show responsibility."
- United Nations: United Nations Secretary-General António Guterres said that "any form of cooperation of any country with North Korea must respect the sanctions regime that was imposed by the Security Council."

== See also ==
- Foreign relations of Russia
- Foreign relations of North Korea
- 2019 visit by Kim Jong Un to Russia
- 2024 visit by Vladimir Putin to North Korea
- List of international trips made by Kim Jong Un
- North Korea and the Russian invasion of Ukraine
