= North Korean–Russian Treaty on Comprehensive Strategic Partnership =

2024 security and defense treaty

Treaty on Comprehensive Strategic Partnership between the Russian Federation and the Democratic People's Republic of Korea
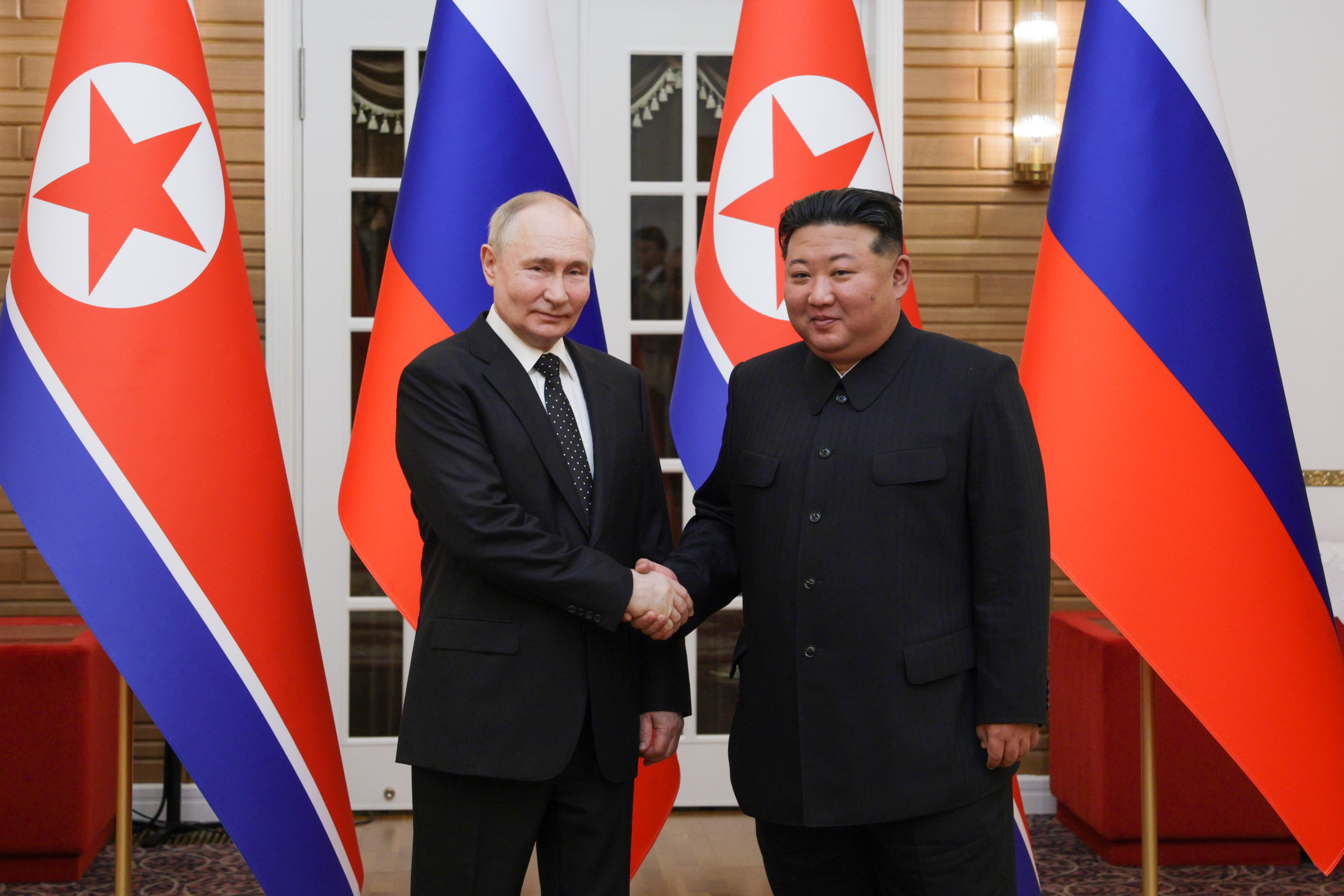
- Kim Jong Un and Vladimir Putin during the 2024 Summit
- Type: Treaty of friendship Defense pact
- Signed: 18 June 2024
- Location: Government Complex No. 1, Pyongyang, North Korea
- Ratified: 6 November (Russia); 11 November (North Korea)
- Effective: 4 December 2024
- Signatories: President of State Affairs Kim Jong Un; President Vladimir Putin
- Parties: North Korea; Russia
- Ratifiers: Federal Assembly; State Affairs Commission
- Languages: Russian; Korean

The Treaty on Comprehensive Strategic Partnership between the Russian Federation and the Democratic People's Republic of Korea (Russian: Договор о всеобъемлющем стратегическом партнёрстве между Россией и КНДР, Korean: 조선민주주의인민공화국과 로씨야련방사이의 포괄적인 전략적동반자관계에 관한 조약) is a security and defense treaty between North Korea and Russia. It was signed on 18 June 2024 during a visit by Russian president Vladimir Putin to North Korea.

== Background ==
After the surrender of Japan that ended Japanese colonial occupation in 1945, the Soviet Union began administering the northern half of Korea while the United States took control of the southern half of the peninsula that would be the impetus of the division of Korea. After many failed attempts to reunify the country, the two regimes emerged as the Democratic People's Republic of Korea, proclaimed on 10 July 1948, while the Republic of Korea was declared on 15 August 1948; both laying claim to be the sole legitimate government of the Korean Peninsula. The Soviet Union recognized the DPRK on 9 September 1948 as the sole legitimate government of Korea. Soviet occupation troops left the northern peninsula in December 1948.

The Korean War of 1950 to 1953 attempted to reunify the country by force but ended in a stalemate leading to the creation of the Korean Demilitarized Zone (DMZ). After the war, the Soviet Union and North Korea signed the Treaty of Friendship, Cooperation and Mutual Assistance in 1961 which saw the Soviet Union continuing to aid North Korea even after the events of 1956. The ascension of Mikhail Gorbachev in 1985 reduced the aid of North Korea but the dissolution of the Soviet Union in 1991 completely cut off aid under Russian president Boris Yeltsin. Following the rise of Vladimir Putin in 2000, relations between the two countries began to improve.

== History ==
The treaty was signed on 18 June 2024 by North Korean leader Kim Jong Un and Russian president Vladimir Putin in Pyongyang. It came amidst deepening ties between Russia and North Korea into a comprehensive strategic partnership and suspected North Korean support for Russia during its war with Ukraine. Kim described the relationship between two nations as a "fiery friendship" and called the treaty the "strongest ever treaty", while Putin praised it as a "breakthrough document".

== Content ==
The treaty is composed of a preamble and 23 articles. It covers political, trade, investment, and security cooperation.

Article 3 states "in case a direct threat of armed invasion is created", the two nations "shall immediately operate the channel of bilateral negotiations for the purpose of adjusting their stands" and "discussing feasible practical measures". Article 4 of the treaty states that should either nation "put in a state of war by an armed invasion", the other "provide military and other assistance with all means in its possession without delay" in accordance "with Article 51 of the UN Charter and the laws of the DPRK and the Russian Federation".

Article 8 states the two sides "shall establish mechanisms" to "strengthen defense capabilities to prevent war". Article 10 states that the parties "develop exchanges and cooperation" in areas such as science and "peaceful nuclear energy". The treaty also expresses opposition to "unilateral coercive measures of an extraterritorial nature." Article 16 state the two nations "consider the implementation of such measures to be illegal and acts that violate the U.N. Charter and international norms".

== Ratification ==
On 24 October 2024, the State Duma unanimously voted to ratify the agreement; the Federation Council ratified the treaty on 6 November, in a similar unanimous vote. On 9 November, Russian President Vladimir Putin signed the North Korea-Russia Comprehensive Strategic Partnership Treaty into law. Kim Jong Un in his capacity as the President of the State Affairs Commission of North Korea signed a decree which ratified the treaty on 11 November. The treaty officially came into force on 4 December after the exchange of ratification instruments.

== Aftermath ==
In October 2024, according to South Korea's intelligence agency, North Korea sent 1,500 special operation forces in Russia to prepare for battle in Ukraine. In December, Aleksandr Matsegora, the Russian ambassador to North Korea, hosted a reception to mark the signature of the treaty.

== See also ==
- Iranian–Russian Treaty on Comprehensive Strategic Partnership
- Treaty on Friendship, Cooperation and Mutual Assistance between China and North Korea
