= 2019 visit by Kim Jong Un to Russia =

Covert bilateral meeting

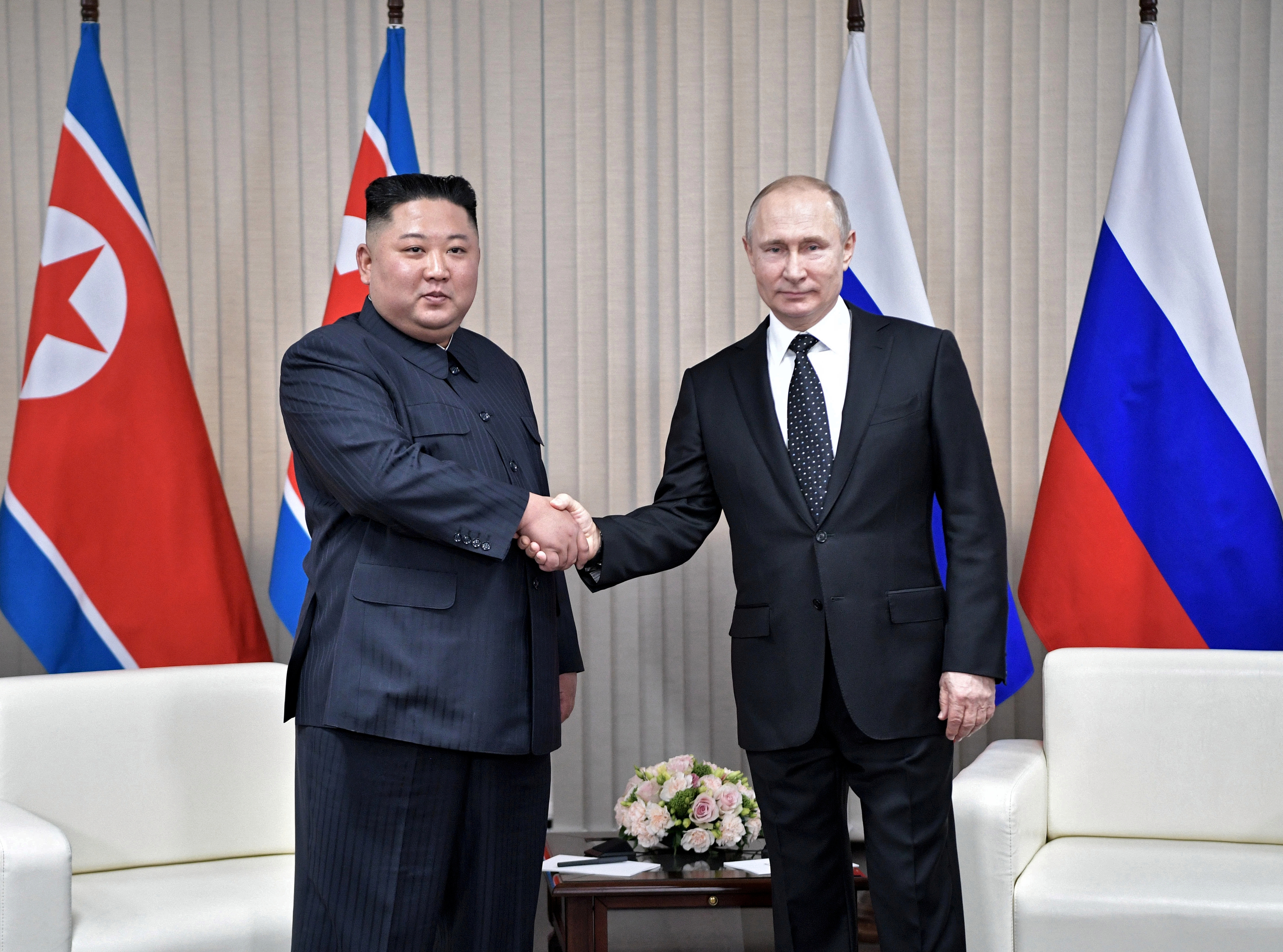
- Meeting between Korean Workers' Party Chairman Kim Jong Un (left) and Russian President Vladimir Putin
- Date: 25 April 2019
- Location: Vladivostok, Russia
- Participants: (Russia) Vladimir Putin (President) (North Korea) Kim Jong Un (Chairman)

On 25 April 2019, Chairman of the Workers' Party of Korea Kim Jong Un visited Russia. This was Kim's first official visit to Russia. The visit included a summit meeting between North Korea and Russia where Kim Jong Un met with Russian President Vladimir Putin, the first meeting between the two leaders.

== Visit ==
The summit was initiated by invitation from Vladimir Putin, President of Russia, in early April. Regarding the summit with DPRK, Russian President Putin believed that DPRK and Kim Jong Un needs international security guarantees to give up its nuclear arsenal and program. Russian President Vladimir Putin also said after holding discussion with North Korean leader Kim Jong Un on 25 April that he thought U.S. security guarantees would probably not be enough to persuade Pyongyang to shut all of its nuclear program. The meeting took place in the Russian Pacific port of Vladivostok, close to the North Korean–Russian border. Kim arrived via an armored train from North Korea.

=== Agenda ===
Kim Jong Un requested Russian leader Vladimir Putin's help in resolving a nuclear stalemate with the U.S. and Putin told reporters that "Chairman Kim Jong Un himself asked us to inform the American side about his position", after about three hours of talks in the Russian Pacific port of Vladivostok. Putin also said, "There are no secrets here. We will discuss this with the Americans and our Chinese partners".

== Reactions ==
Considering Russia's own concerns about the North's nuclear and ICBM missile programs, Dmitri Trenin, the director of the Carnegie Moscow Center, stated Russian President Putin will likely inspire DPRK's Kim to continue constructive talks with Washington.

North Korea's state news agency KCNA reported that Putin accepted Kim's invitation to visit North Korea at a time convenient for the Russian President.

Kim Sung-han, dean of Korea University's Graduate School of International Studies in Seoul and a former vice minister at the South Korean Ministry of Foreign Affairs, expressed his opinions: "If the Hanoi summit had gone well, North Korea would not have needed to visit Russia". Dmitri Trenin, head of the Moscow Carnegie Center, wrote on Twitter: "Russia will seek to score diplomatic points by demonstrating its relevance; North Korea, by showing it has options".

KCNA reported a statement of the North Korean leader that peace on the Korean peninsula depends on the USA's attitude after the face to face talks between Putin and Kim. It appears DPRK is asking for more flexibility in allowing Pyongyang's demands to ease the sanctions with the nuclear deal, compared to the US's stance on the flexibility of the U.N's economic sanction.

== See also ==
- North Korea–Russia relations
- Foreign relations of Russia
- Foreign relations of North Korea
- 2023 visit by Kim Jong Un to Russia
- 2024 visit by Vladimir Putin to North Korea
- 2017–2018 North Korea crisis
- List of international trips made by Kim Jong Un
- Kim–Xi meetings
- April 2018 inter-Korean summit
- May 2018 inter-Korean summit
- September 2018 inter-Korean summit
- Proposed Peace Treaty on the Korean Peninsula
- 2018 North Korea–United States Singapore Summit
- 2019 North Korea–United States Hanoi Summit
- Nuclear power in North Korea
