= 2024 visit by Vladimir Putin to North Korea =

Meeting of Kim Jong Un and Vladimir Putin in Pyongyang

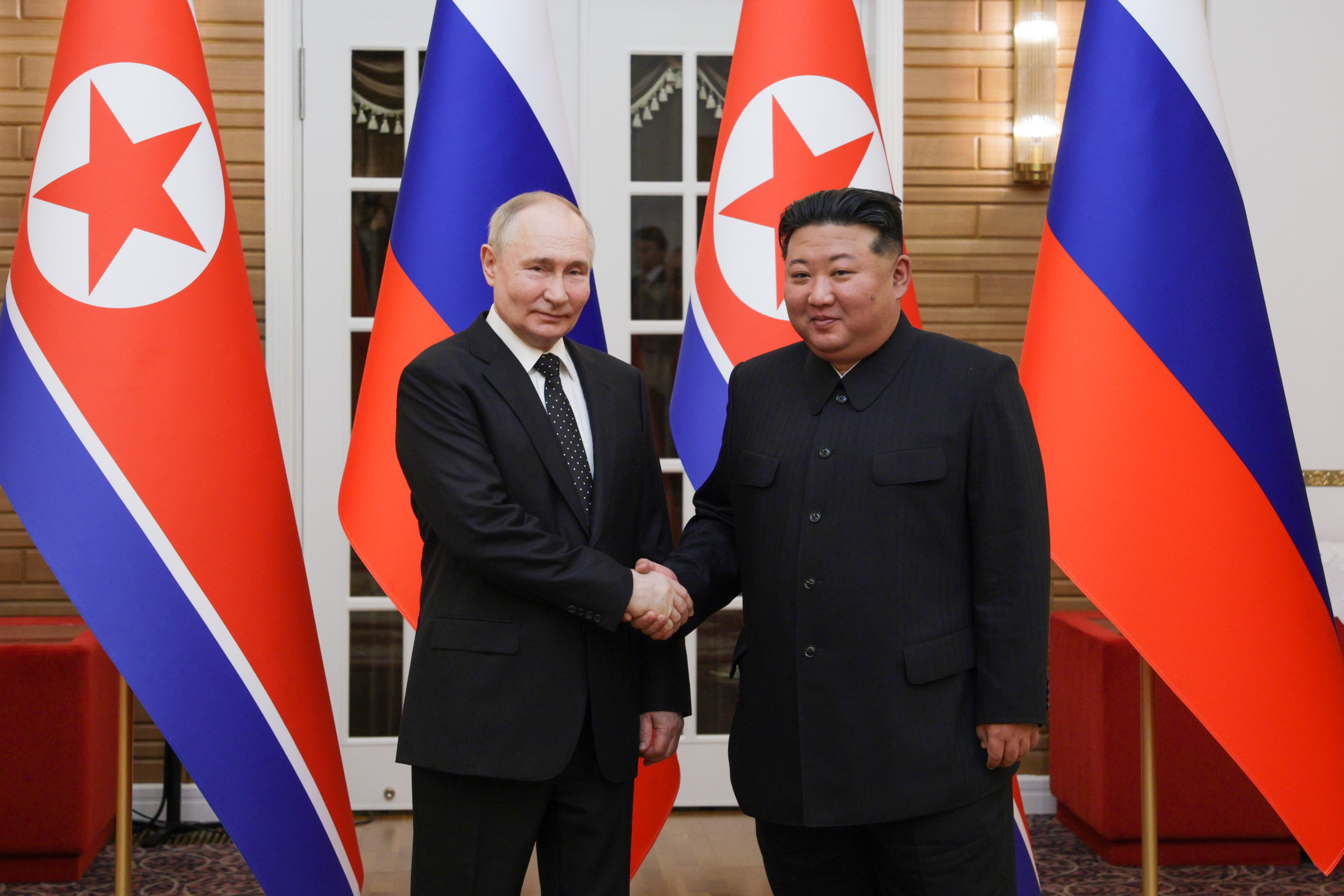
- Kim Jong Un and Vladimir Putin shaking hands in Pyongyang
- Date: 19 June 2024
- Location: Pyongyang, North Korea
- Participants: (North Korea) Kim Jong Un (General Secretary & President of the State Affairs) (Russia) Vladimir Putin (President)

On June 19, 2024, Vladimir Putin, the president of Russia, visited North Korea. This was Putin's first official visit to North Korea since 2000, and came after North Korea–Russia relations improved significantly following the 2022 Russian invasion of Ukraine.

The visit included summit meeting between North Korea and Russia where North Korean leader Kim Jong Un met with Putin in Pyongyang, the capital of North Korea. This was the third meeting between the two leaders after the ones in 2019 and 2023. During the visit, the two leaders signed the North Korean–Russian Treaty on Comprehensive Strategic Partnership.

== Background ==
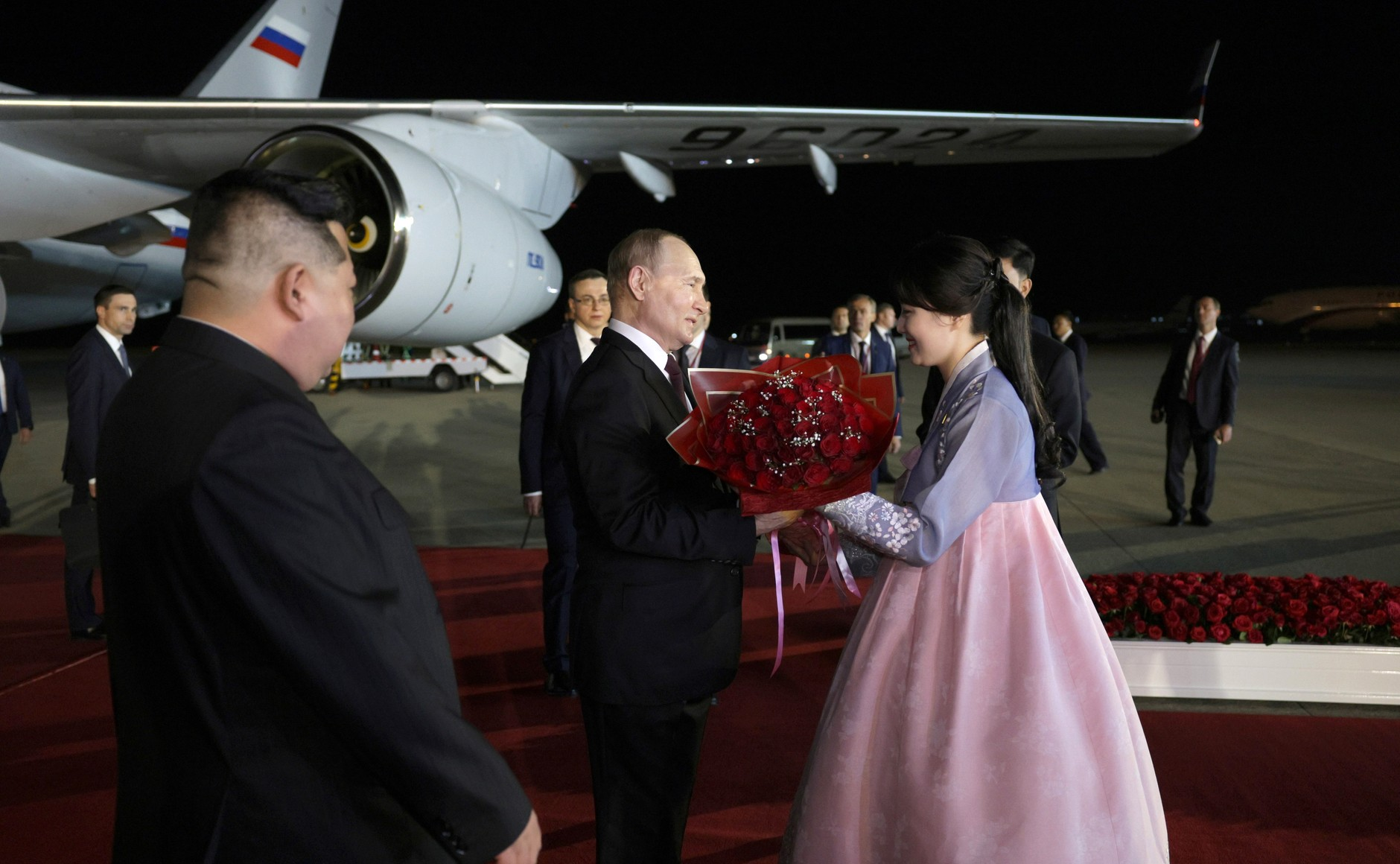
In Pyongyang airport prior to a meeting between North Korean leader Kim Jong Un (left) and Russian president Vladimir Putin (center) in June 2024

The visit came after North Korea–Russia relations improved significantly following the 2022 Russian invasion of Ukraine. This was Putin's first official visit to North Korea since 2000. A few days before his arrival, it was reported that the Pyongyang International Airport was cleared of aircraft. A Russian cargo aircraft landed a few days before his arrival.

Hours before his arrival, Putin wrote an editorial titled "Russia and the DPRK: Traditions of Friendship and Cooperation Through the Years" in Rodong Sinmun, the official newspaper of the Workers' Party of Korea, where he praised the "friendly and neighborly relationship between Russia and the DPRK", thanked North Korea for its "unwavering support for Russia’s special military operation in Ukraine" and accused the United States of trying to "impose a global neocolonial dictatorship based on double standards".

== The visit ==
Following Putin's arrival to Pyongyang Airport in a Ilyushin Il-96, where he was met by Kim Jong Un, they rode to the Kumsusan State Guest House where Putin stayed during his visit. Pyongyang's streets were decorated with portraits of Putin. During the visit a ceremony took place at Kim Il Sung Square, with Kim and Putin greeting officials on a red carpet, military bands played the national anthems of Russia and North Korea and children waved balloons and the North Korean and Russian flags. Negotiations between Putin and Kim took place at the Kumsusan Guesthouse and lasted more than 10 hours.

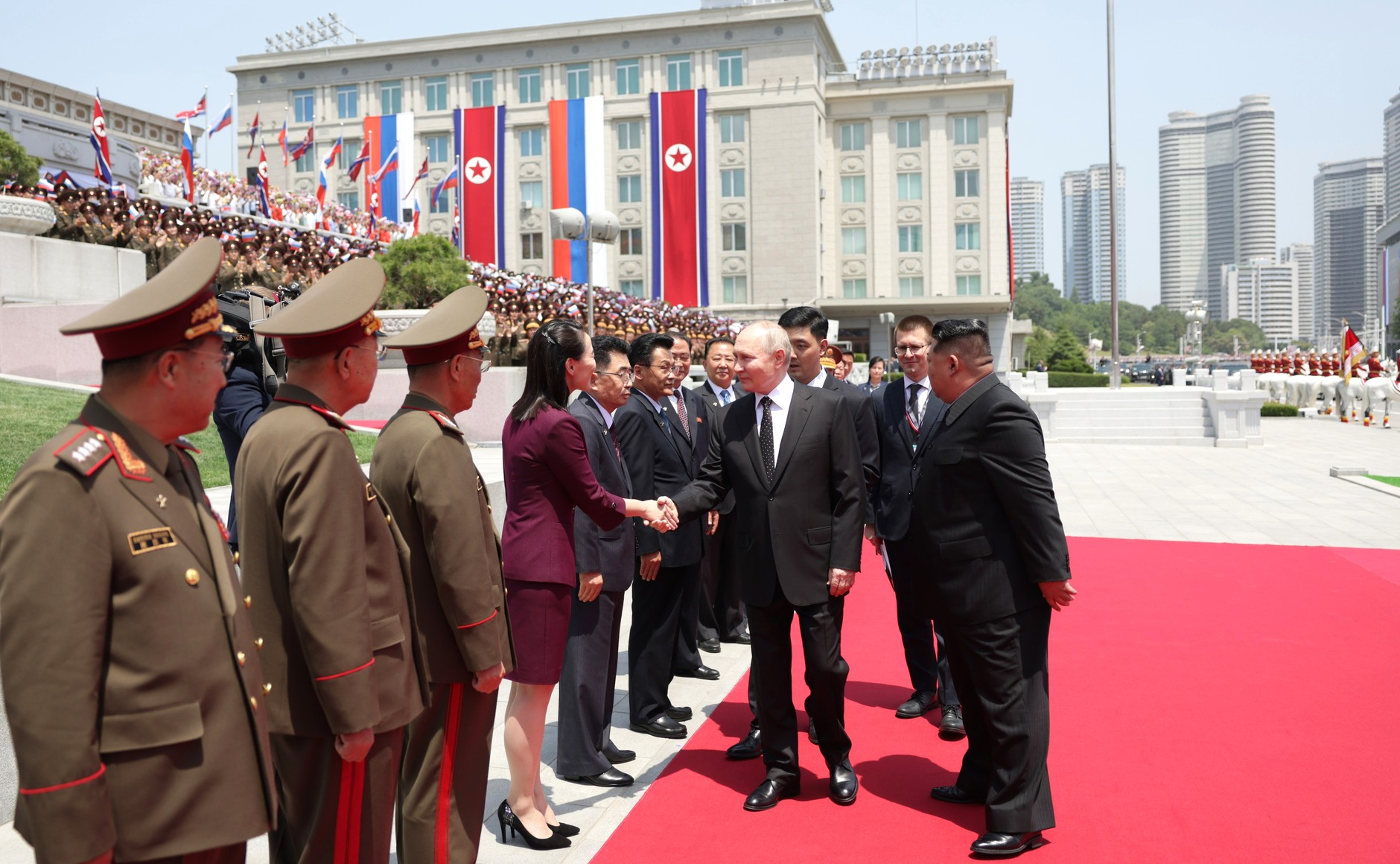
North Korean and Russians top officials at Kim Il Sung Square in Pyongyang

Putin expressed appreciation for North Korea's support of Russia's military actions in Ukraine and emphasized their mutual opposition to Western ambitions, "to hinder the establishment of a multipolar world order based on justice, mutual respect for sovereignty, considering each other’s interests." Kim Jong Un expressed "full support" for Russia's war in Ukraine and pledged stronger strategic ties with Moscow, calling Putin the "dearest friend" of the Korean people. Putin also discussed developing trade and payment systems independent of Western control and expanding cooperation in tourism, culture, and education.

During the visit, a number of agreements were signed, including the North Korean–Russian Treaty on Comprehensive Strategic Partnership. The agreement was ratified by the Federation Council, the Russian parliament's upper house on November 6, 2024. Following the signature of the pact, the two leaders drove one another in an Aurus Senat limousine, which Putin later presented to Kim as a gift. The North Korean leader, in turn, presented gifts with an image of the Russian president.

== See also ==
- Foreign relations of Russia
- Foreign relations of North Korea
- 2019 visit by Kim Jong Un to Russia
- 2023 visit by Kim Jong Un to Russia
