= Day of Victory in the Great Fatherland Liberation War =

Holiday in North Korea

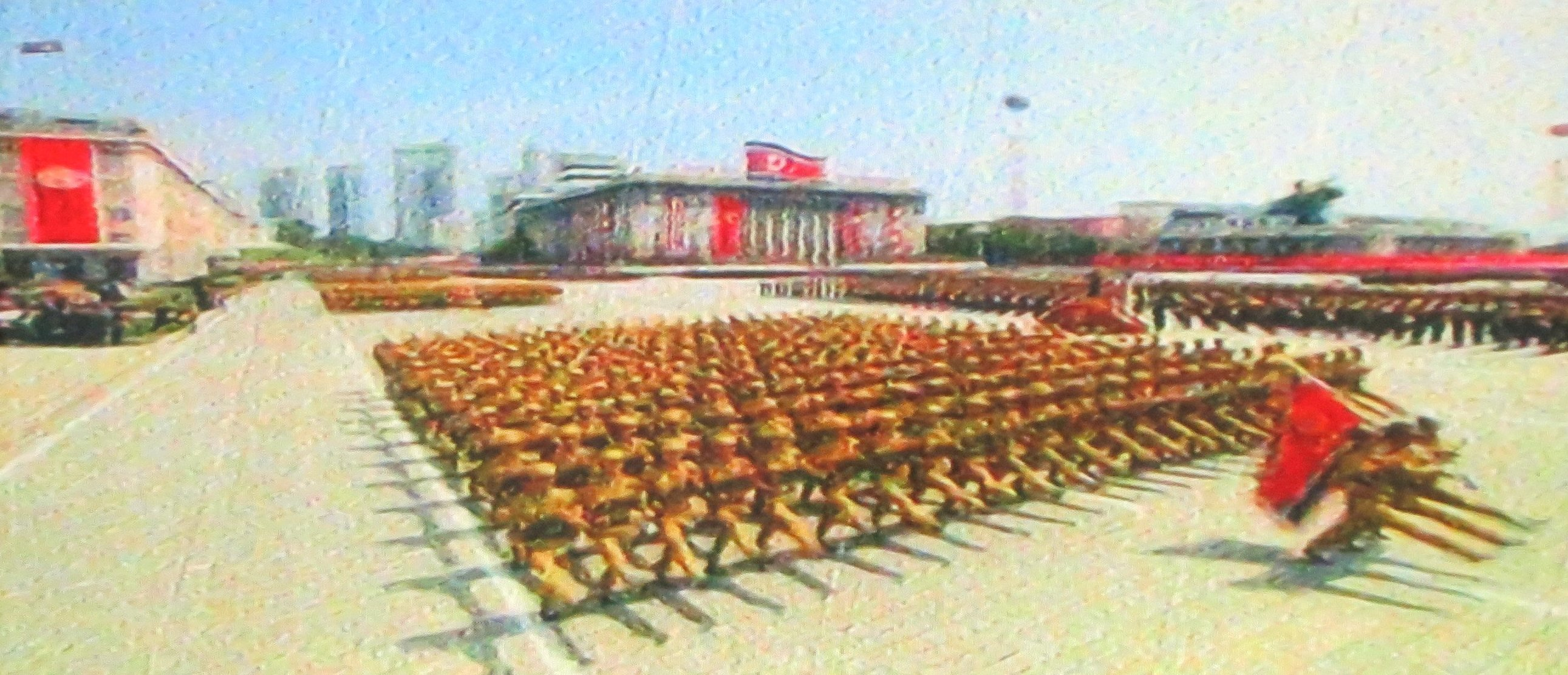
- Soldiers of the Korean People's Army dressed in Korean War-era uniforms marching through Kim Il-sung Square at the 2013 Victory Day parade.
- Observed by: North Korea
- Significance: Armistice of the Korean War
- Observances: Ceremonies at the Victorious Fatherland Liberation War Memorial
- Date: July 27
- Next time: July 27, 2027
- Frequency: Annual

Korean name
- Hangul: 조국해방전쟁 승리 기념일
- Hanja: 祖國解放戰爭 勝利 紀念日
- RR: Jogukhaebangjeonjaeng seungni ginyeomil
- MR: Chogukhaebangjŏnjaeng sŭngni kinyŏmil

The Day of Victory in the Great Fatherland Liberation War (Victory Day) is a national holiday in North Korea celebrated on July 27 to mark the signing of the Korean Armistice Agreement which brought a cease fire to the Fatherland Liberation War (Korean War) that took place in 1950–53; it is referred to as "Victory Day" as a form of government propaganda to boost the morale of the army and the people, despite the fact that the war is generally regarded as having ended in a stalemate. On this day, ceremonies are primarily held at the Victorious Fatherland Liberation War Memorial.

== History ==
In 1973, July 27 was designated as the Day of Victory in the Great Fatherland Liberation War. Ceremonies such as central plenary meetings (중앙보고대회, also alternatively translated as national meetings) were done in a small scale only in the 5th and 10th anniversaries.

From 1993 to 1998, central plenary meetings were held annually.

In 1996, during the 43rd anniversary, the day was promoted to the status of a national holiday, which involved raising the North Korean flag and resting for one day. In 1999, central plenary meetings were omitted. From 2000 to 2002, the ceremonies were reduced in size and was mainly run as a cultural athletic event due to the inter Korean summits. In 2003, the size of the ceremonies increased due to international tensions and nuclear crisis.

In Jubilee years since 2013 (5th and 10th year anniversaries) the principal national parade has been held on Kim Il Sung Square, on non-jubilee years an annual small scaled parade has been held at the facade of the Pyongyang Gymnasium since 2024.

== See also ==
- Culture of North Korea
