= 2018–19 Korean peace process =

Attempts to resolve the Korean conflict

- Organized by: (North Korea) Supreme leader Kim Jong Un (South Korea) President Moon Jae-in (United States) President Donald Trump (China) Paramount leader Xi Jinping (Russia) President Vladimir Putin
- Participants: North Korea; South Korea; United States; China; Russia

The 2018–19 Korean peace process was initiated to resolve the long-running Korean conflict and denuclearize Korea. International concerns about North Korea's nuclear weapons came to a head in 2017, when they posed a direct threat to the United States. At the same time, Moon Jae-in was elected president of South Korea with the promise of returning to the Sunshine Policy, favoring good relations with North Korea.

A series of summits were held between North Korea's Kim Jong Un, South Korea's Moon, and Donald Trump of the United States. Trump became the first sitting US President to meet a North Korean leader and to enter North Korean territory. Kim became the first North Korean leader to enter South Korean territory. Moon became the first South Korean President to give a speech in North Korea. In parallel to this, a number of cultural exchanges and diplomatic ventures began. Tensions were lowered on both sides of the DMZ.

Despite these developments, the summits failed to make substantial progress towards denuclearization or a peace treaty. In October 2019, talks in Sweden began between US and North Korean negotiating teams, but broke down after one day. Subsequently, relations deteriorated, though dialogue continued.

== Background ==
In 1945, at the end of World War II, Korea was divided. In 1950, war broke out between North and South Korea. The United States intervened to defend the South and has continued a military presence to the present day. A cease fire ended the fighting in 1953, but no official peace treaty has been signed. Frequent clashes have occurred up to recent times.

At the end of the Cold War, North Korea lost its supporters in the Soviet Bloc. In December 1991 North and South Korea made an accord, the Agreement on Reconciliation, Non-Aggression, Exchange and Cooperation, pledging non-aggression and cultural and economic exchanges. They also agreed to prior notification of major military movements and established a military hotline, and to work on replacing the armistice with a "peace regime".

In 1994, concern over North Korea's nuclear program led to the Agreed Framework between the US and North Korea. In 1998, South Korean President Kim Dae-jung announced a Sunshine Policy towards North Korea. An Inter-Korean summit was held in 2000. Continuing concerns about North Korea's development of nuclear missiles led in 2003 to the six-party talks that included North Korea, South Korea, the US, Russia, China, and Japan. In 2006, however, North Korea resumed testing missiles and on October 9 conducted its first nuclear test. A second inter-Korean summit was held in 2007. By 2017, estimates of North Korea's nuclear arsenal ranged between 15 and 60 bombs, probably including hydrogen bombs. In the opinion of analysts, the Hwasong-15 missile is capable of striking anywhere in the United States. There was an increase in militaristic rhetoric on both sides.

== Thaw at the Winter Games ==
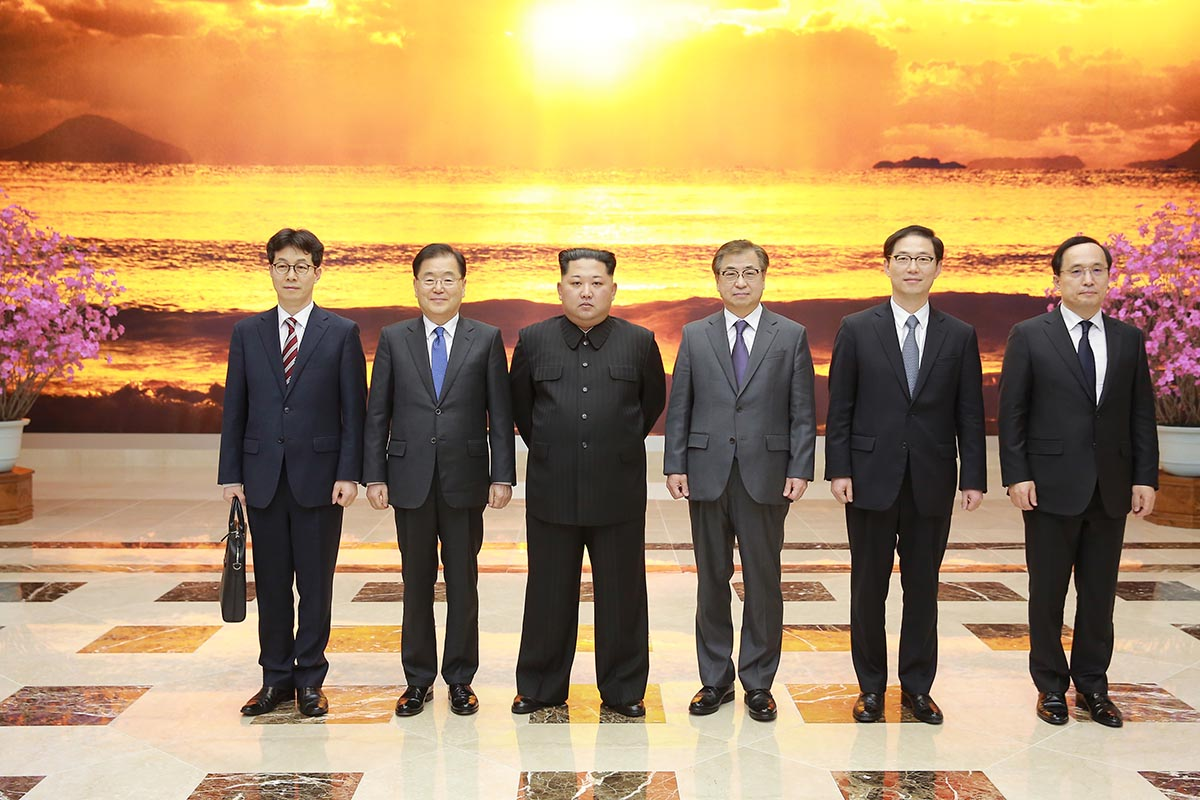
Party chairman Kim Jong Un meeting with South Korean envoys at the Workers' Party of Korea main building, 6 March 2018

In May 2017 Moon Jae-in was elected President of South Korea with a promise to return to the Sunshine Policy. In his New Year address for 2018, North Korean leader, Chairman of the Workers' Party of Korea Kim Jong Un proposed sending a delegation to the upcoming Winter Olympics in South Korea. The Seoul–Pyongyang hotline was reopened after almost two years. At the Winter Olympics, North and South Korea marched together in the opening ceremony and fielded a united women's ice hockey team. As well as the athletes, North Korea sent an unprecedented high-level delegation, headed by Kim Yo Jong, sister of Kim Jong Un, and President Kim Yong-nam, and including performers like the Samjiyon Orchestra. The delegation passed on an invitation to President Moon to visit North Korea. An opinion poll taken on 15 February found that 61.5% of South Koreans thought Moon should take up the invitation.

The performances by the Samjiyon Orchestra at the Olympics marked the first time since 2006 that any North Korean artist performed in South Korea. The North Korean ship which carried the orchestra, Man Gyong Bong 92, was also the first North Korean ship to arrive in South Korea since 2002.

Following the Olympics, the governments of North and South Korea raised the possibility that they could host the 2021 Asian Winter Games together. On 1 April, South Korean K-pop stars performed a concert in Pyongyang titled Spring Is Coming, which was attended by Kim Jong Un and his wife. Meanwhile, propaganda broadcasts stopped on both sides. The K-pop stars were part of a 160-member South Korean art troupe which performed in North Korea in early April 2018. It also marked the first time since 2005 that any South Korean artist performed in North Korea.

== April 2018 inter-Korean summit ==
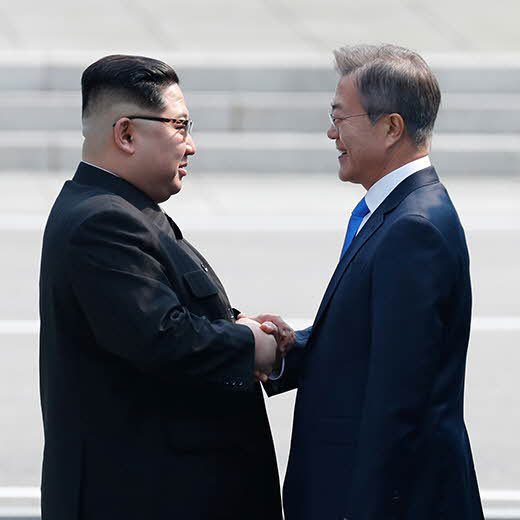
Kim and Moon shake hands in greeting at the demarcation line.

On 27 April, a summit took place between Moon and Kim in the South Korean zone of the Joint Security Area. It was the first time since the Korean War that a North Korean leader had entered South Korean territory. The leaders met at the line that divides Korea. Kim and Moon signed the Panmunjom Declaration pledging to work towards a final peace to the Korean conflict within a year and the complete denuclearization of Korea. The agreement also called for the end of military activities in the region of the Korean border and the reunification of Korea. The leaders also agreed to work together to connect and modernise their railways.

On 5 May, North Korea adjusted its time zone to match the South's. In May, South Korea began removing propaganda loudspeakers from the border area in line with the Panmunjom Declaration.

== May 2018 inter-Korean summit ==
Moon and Kim met on May 26 to discuss Kim's upcoming summit with Trump. The summit led to further meetings between North and South Korean officials during June. On June 1, officials from both countries agreed to move forward with the military and Red Cross talks. They also agreed to reopen a jointly operated liaison office in Kaesong that the South had shut down in February 2016 after a North Korean nuclear test. The second meeting, involving the Red Cross and military, was held on June 22 at North Korea's Mount Kumgang resort, where it was agreed that family reunions would resume.

== 2018 North Korea–United States Singapore Summit ==
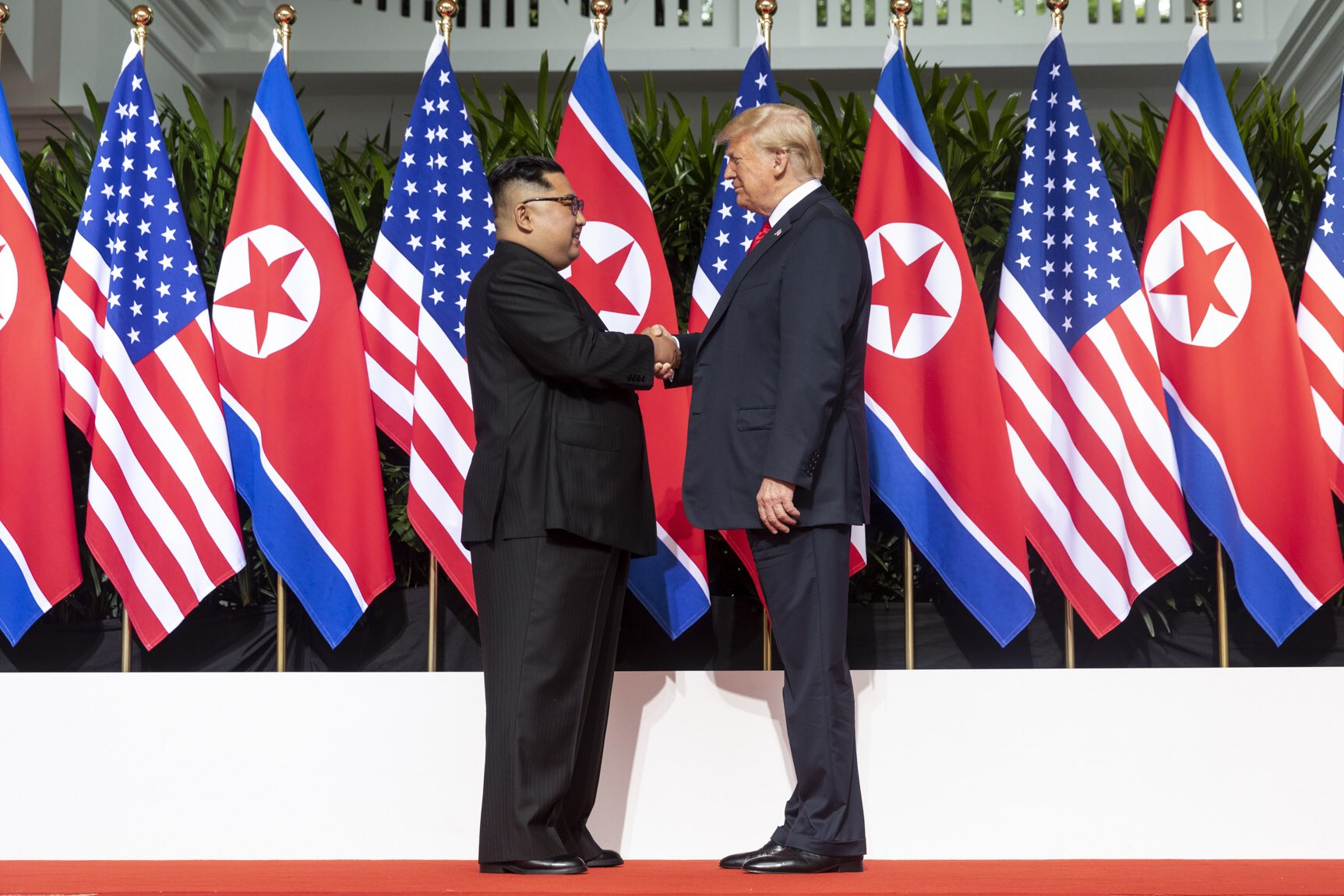
Kim and Trump in Singapore

Donald Trump met with Kim Jong Un on June 12, 2018, in Singapore, in the first summit meeting between the leaders of the United States and North Korea. They signed a joint statement, agreeing to security guarantees for North Korea, new peaceful relations, reaffirmation of the denuclearization of the Korean Peninsula, recovery of soldiers' remains, and follow-up negotiations between high-level officials. Immediately following the summit, Trump announced that the US would discontinue "provocative" joint military exercises with South Korea, and he wishes to bring the U.S. forces back home at some point, but he said that was not part of the Singapore agreement.

== Aftermath of Singapore summit ==
=== Subsequent negotiations ===
From July 6 to 7, Pompeo visited North Korea for the third time to continue the negotiations with General Kim Yong-chol. After the meeting, Pompeo stated that the talks had been productive and that progress had been made "on almost all of the central issues". However, the North Korean state media criticized the meeting soon after, saying the U.S. had shown a "gangster-like attitude" and calling the demands of the Trump administration "deeply regrettable". Pompeo delivered a letter from Kim to Trump, in which Kim expressed his hope for successful implementation of the US-North Korea Joint Statement and reaffirmed his will for improving the relations between the countries.

Pompeo announced on August 23, 2018, that he would return to North Korea the following week for the fourth round of talks. The following day, Trump tweeted that he had asked Pompeo not to make the trip because he felt "we are not making sufficient progress with respect to the denuclearization of the Korean Peninsula". South Korean Foreign Minister Kang Kyung-wha urged continued U.S.-North Korean talks.

In August, Foreign Minister Kang said that she had "considerable" consultations over a declaration of a formal end of the Korean War with the Chinese and U.S. foreign ministers. Chinese Foreign Minister Wang Yi expressed support for a declaration. North Korean Foreign Minister Ri Yong Ho said he was "alarmed" by U.S. insistence on maintaining sanctions until North Korea denuclearizes and what he said was U.S. reluctance to declare an end to the Korean War. According to Vox, Trump had made a spoken agreement with North Korea to sign a declaration ending the Korean War, both at a White House meeting on June 1, and during the Singapore Summit. However, National Security Adviser John Bolton and Defense Secretary Jim Mattis both opposed signing the declaration before denuclearization.

=== Return of remains of US soldiers ===
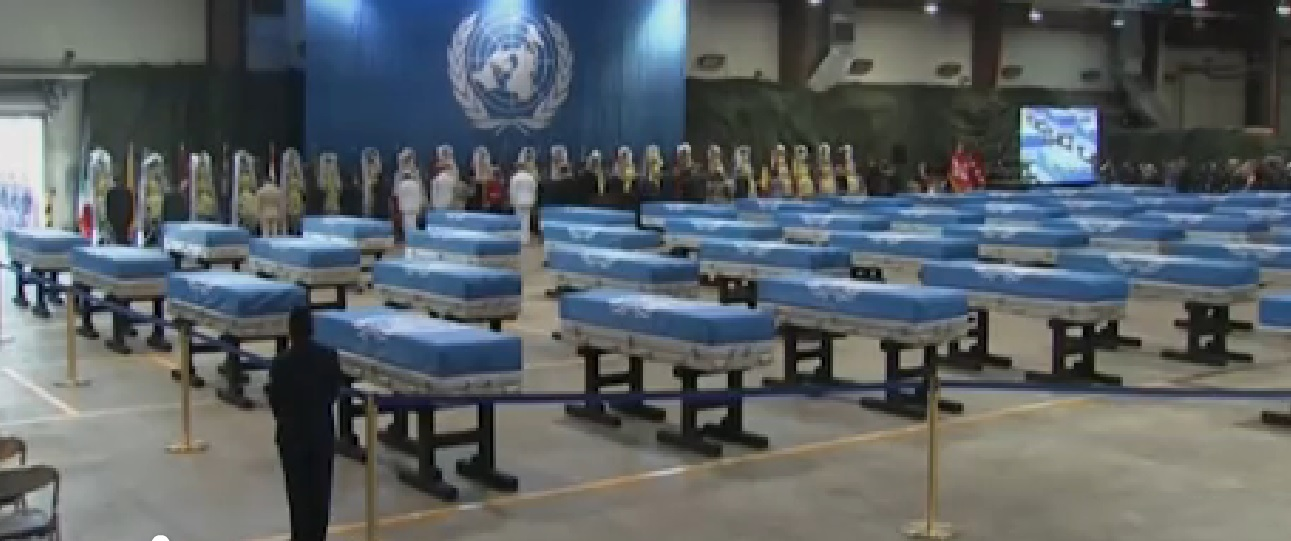
After the Trump-Kim summit, North Korea searched for and returned the remains of U.S. POWs and MIAs from the Korean War.

On July 27 North Korea handed over 55 boxes of human remains, thus starting to fulfill their pledge in the Singapore declaration. The remains were saluted in a ceremony in their honor by US soldiers. More than 36,000 American troops died during the Korean War, but some 7,700 remain unaccounted for, including 5,300 believed to have died in North Korea. The remains of 220 soldiers were recovered from North Korea during the years 1996–2005. North Korea reported to the U.S. Defense POW/MIA Accounting Agency that they could not be sure how many individuals were represented in each of the 55 boxes. After the failure of the Hanoi Summit, the US suspended the program. By October 2019, it was reported that 35–40 servicemen had been identified.

=== Dismantling of rocket launch sites ===
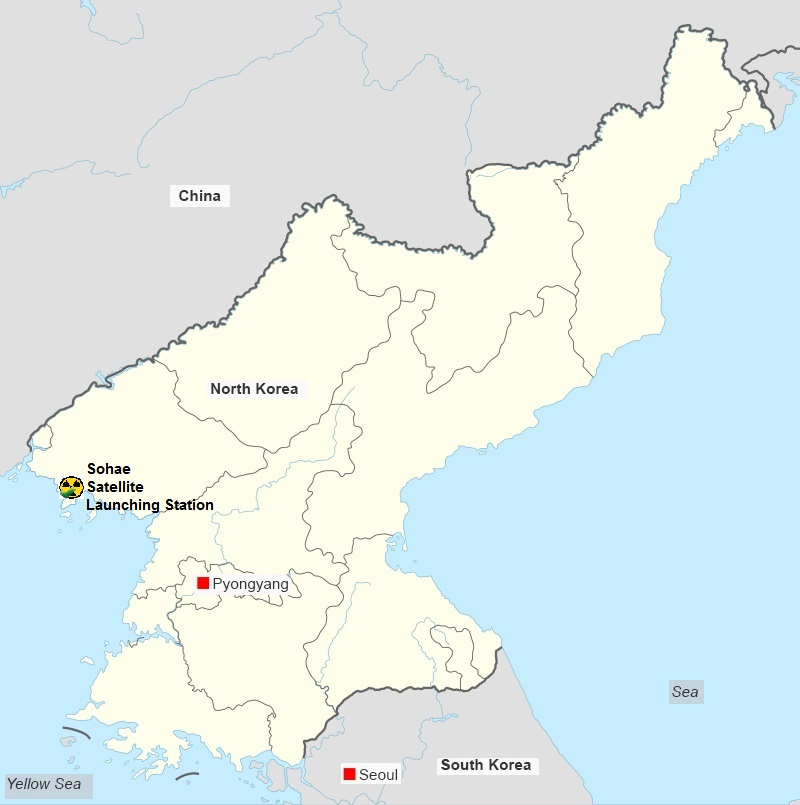
North Korea dismantled the various significant parts and permanent structure of the Sohae ICBM missile and satellite launching station.

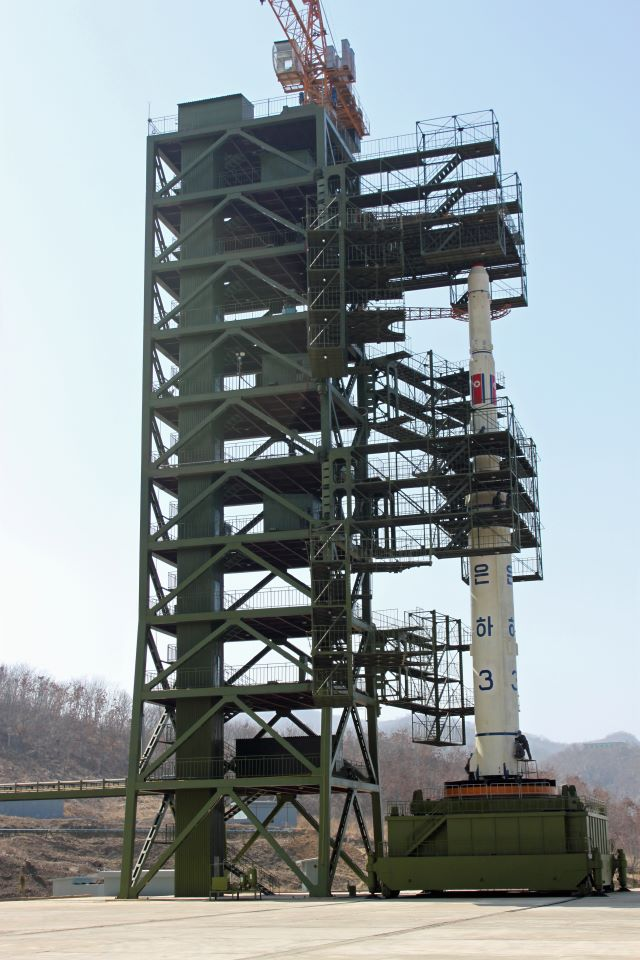
A North Korean Unha-3 rocket at a launch pad

On July 24, North Korea began to dismantle a rocket launch site at Tonchang, an action which Kim had pledged to Trump. South Korean President Moon called the move "a good sign for North Korea's denuclearization". At the same time, the Sohae Satellite Launching Station was being dismantled. Satellite imagery showed that several key facilities had been demolished, including the rail-mounted processing building, where space launch vehicles were prepared before moving them to the launch pad, and the rocket engine test stand. According to the analyst website 38 North, the Sohae Station was believed to have played an important part in North's ICBM program, and its dismantlement represented a first step towards fulfilling Kim's commitment to disarmament. By August 7, there was more progress on dismantling facilities at the Sohae Station, including the demolition of the test stand's concrete foundations, launch pad's gantry tower, and the pad foundation. According to 38 North, these actions had to be viewed cautiously as since they were neither permanent or irreversible.

=== Other developments in North and South Korea ===
North Korea stopped its anti-American government propaganda after the Singapore summit and cancelled its annual anti-US government rally. North Korea staged a grand parade for its 70th anniversary without its ICBMs.

On 23 June 2018, South Korea announced that it would not conduct annual military exercises with the US in September, and would also stop its own drills in the Yellow Sea, in order to not provoke North Korea and to continue a peaceful dialog. On July 1, South and North Korea resumed ship-to-ship radio communication, which could prevent accidental clashes between South and North Korean military vessels around the Northern Limit Line (NLL) in the West (Yellow) Sea. On 17 July 2018, South and North Korea fully restored their military communication line on the western part of the peninsula.

North and South Korea competed as "Korea" in some events at the 2018 Asian Games. North Korean movies were screened at the Bucheon International Fantastic Film Festival in South Korea. In August, reunions of families divided since the Korean War took place at Mount Kumgang in North Korea.

North and South Korea agreed to reduce guard posts and equipment along the DMZ. U.S. General Vincent Brooks responded, "I have some concerns about what that means militarily for the ability to defend along the Military Demarcation Line". However, he assessed the risk as being to "a reasonable degree" and said that the move represents an outstanding opportunity to reduce tensions on the DMZ.

== Third inter-Korean summit in 2018 ==
On 13 August, the South Korean Blue House announced that Moon would attend the third inter-Korean summit with Kim in Pyongyang in September. On September 5, during the meeting with South Korean special envoy Chung Eun-yong about the upcoming summit, Kim declared that he wanted to accomplish the denuclearization of Korea before the US leader Donald Trump completes his first term (January 2021).

In Pyongyang, on September 18, both leaders signed an agreement titled the "Pyongyang Joint Declaration of September 2018". The agreement called for the removal of landmines planted at the Joint Security Area. North Korea agreed to dismantle its nuclear program in the presence of international experts if the U.S. took reciprocal action. Moon became the first South Korean leader to give a speech to a North Korean audience when he addressed 150,000 spectators at the Arirang Festival on 19 September.

== North Korea–United States Hanoi Summit, 2019 ==
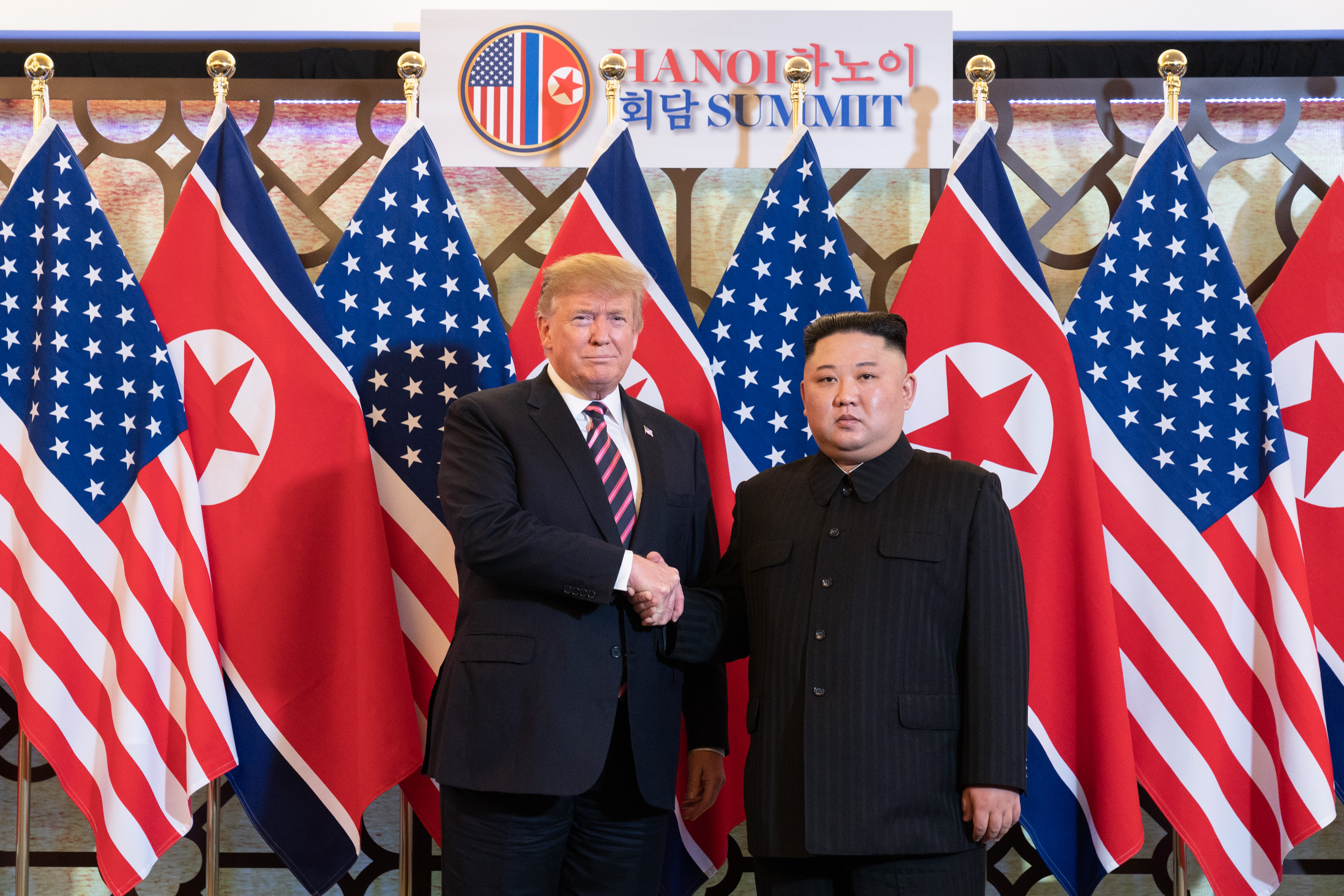
Kim and Trump in Hanoi, Vietnam

Donald Trump met with Kim Jong Un on February 27, 2019, in Hanoi, Vietnam, in the second summit meeting between the leaders of the United States and North Korea. On February 28, 2019, the White House announced that the summit was cut short and that no agreement was reached, with Trump later elaborating that it was because North Korea wanted an end to all sanctions. North Korean Foreign Minister Ri Yong-ho asserted that the country only sought a partial lifting of five United Nations sanctions placed on North Korea during 2016–17.

== DMZ meeting, 2019 ==
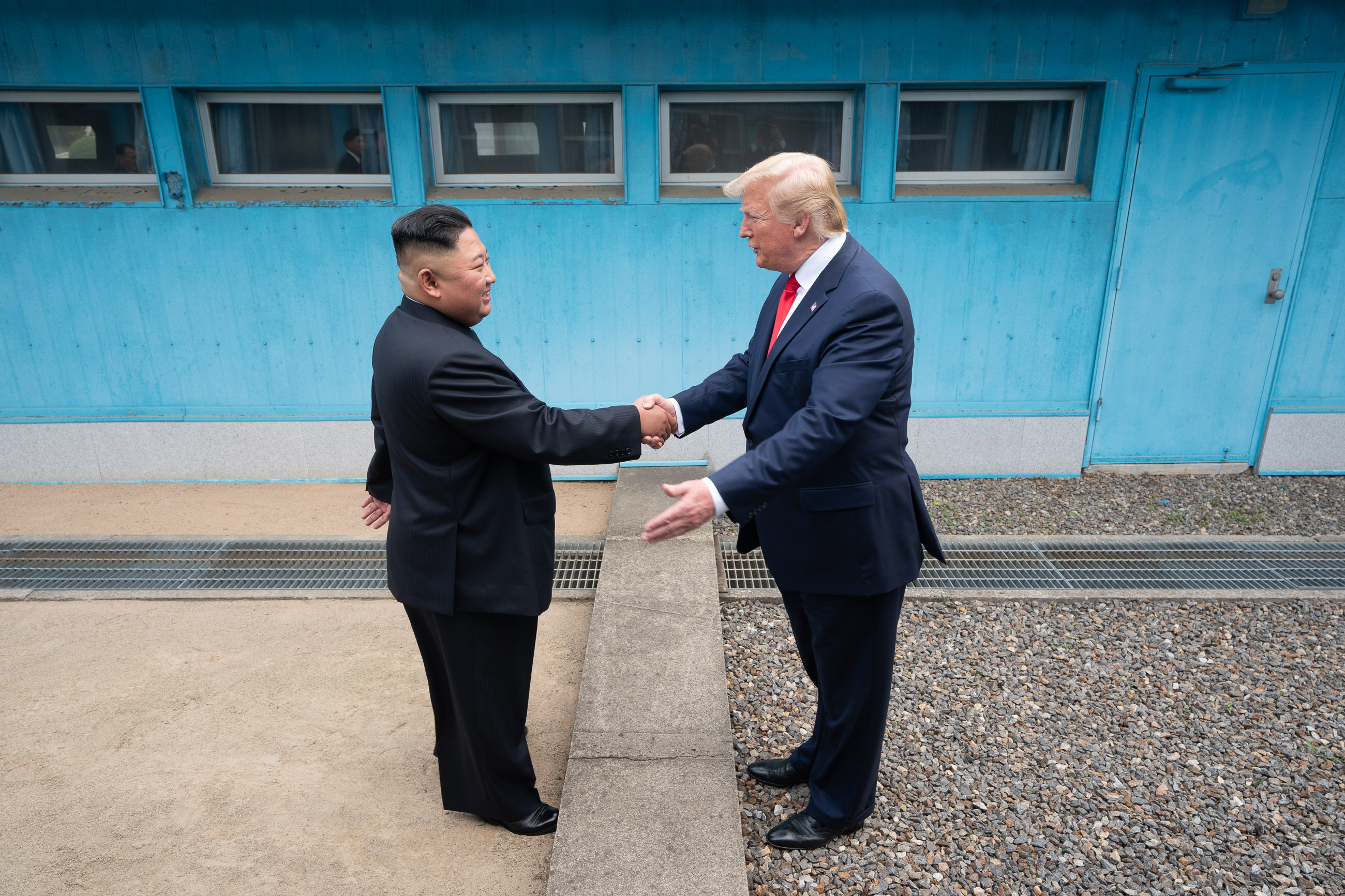
Kim and Trump at the DMZ

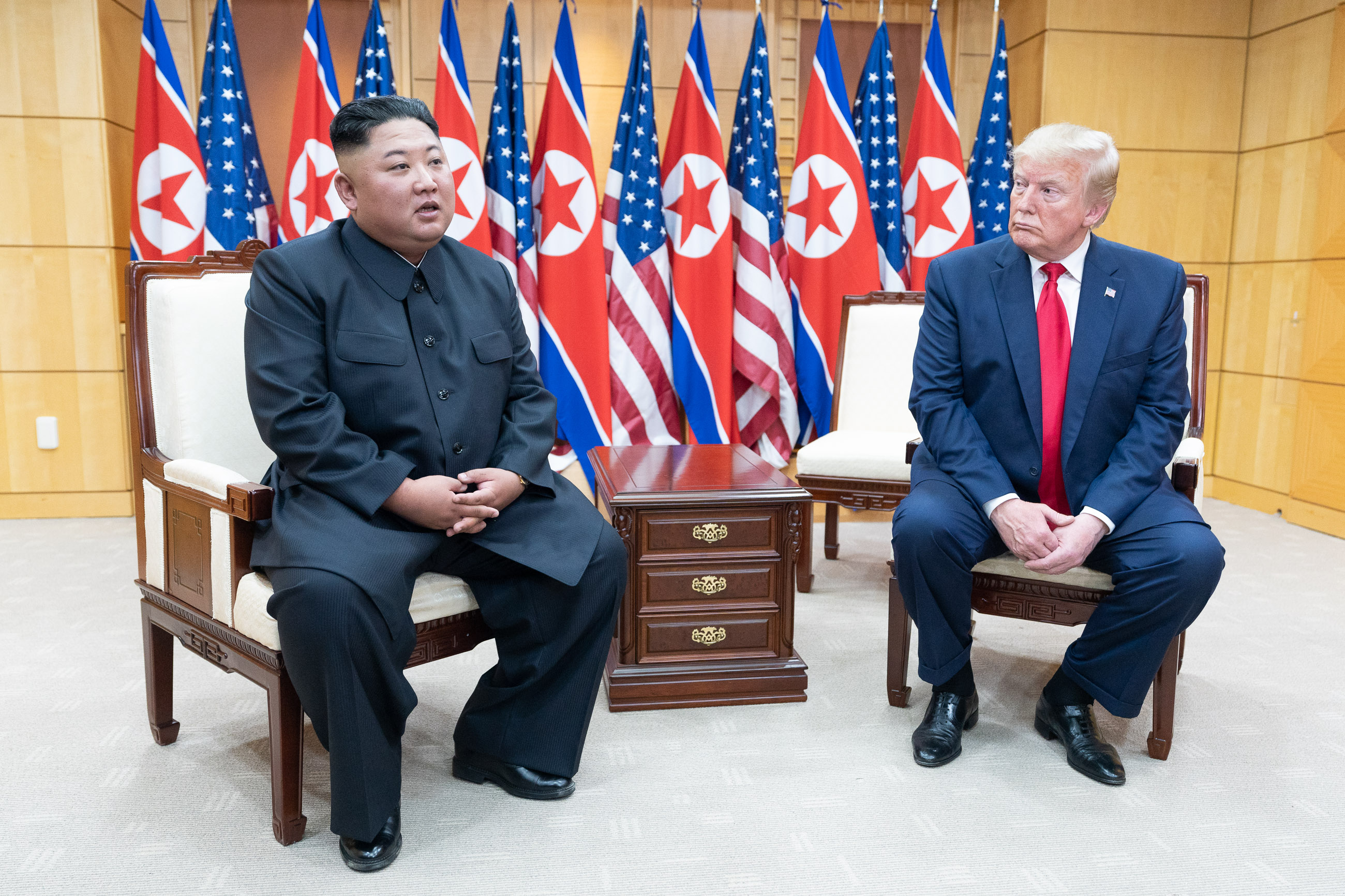
President Trump and Chairman Kim speaking to reporters.

In April 2019 Trump tweeted that a third summit between him and Kim "would be good". On June 12, 2019, he received a letter from Kim which Trump described as "beautiful". On June 26, 2019, it was announced that talks were underway to hold a third U.S.–North Korean summit. On June 22, 2019, an undated photo was also released by the North Korean government of Kim Jong Un reading a letter from Trump. Kim described the letter as "excellent" and described Trump as the "supreme leader" of the United States. However, Kim later denied reports of continued talks with the United States, and relations with the U.S. State Department still remained hostile.

On June 30, 2019, Donald Trump and Moon Jae-in met with Kim Jong Un at the DMZ. The meeting was apparently the result of an impromptu Trump tweet suggesting a possible meeting with Kim at the DMZ "just to shake his hand and say Hello(?)!". When they met, Trump and Kim shook hands, and Kim said in English, "It's good to see you again", "I never expected to meet you at this place", and "You are the first US President to cross the border". They briefly crossed the border into North Korea before crossing back into South Korea.

After meeting at the border, Trump, Kim and Moon Jae-in entered the Inter-Korean House of Freedom for approximately one hour. A result of the brief meeting was that both U.S. and North Korea agreed to set up teams to resume denuclearization talks, which had previously stalled at the Hanoi Summit earlier in the year.

The meeting has been reported as historic as it was the first time a sitting U.S. president has set foot in North Korea; former US Presidents Jimmy Carter and Bill Clinton had previously visited North Korea after they left office.

== Subsequent developments in 2019 ==
During 2019, North Korea conducted a series of short–range missile tests, while the US and South Korea took part in joint military drills in August. On 16 August 2019, North Korea's ruling party made a statement criticizing the South for participating in the drills and for buying US military hardware, calling it a "grave provocation".

On September 10, 2019, Trump tweeted that he had asked Bolton for his resignation which was given shortly thereafter. North Korea had previously called Bolton a "warmonger". Pro-North Korean newspaper Chosun Sinbo welcomed Bolton's resignation, stating that he was to blame for breaking off the February summit in Hanoi. Trump had disagreed with Bolton's advocacy of the "Libyan model" for North Korea. Bolton subsequently repudiated Trump's policy, saying that North Korea was becoming more dangerous.

On September 23, 2019, Trump and Moon met in New York, at the time of the 74th United Nations General Assembly session. Trump downplayed the seriousness of North Korea's short-range missiles, stating that they had not been covered by an agreement and describing them as "nothing spectacular". Both Trump and Moon expressed support for continuing negotiations.

As agreed at the DMZ summit, talks began in Stockholm on 5 October 2019 between US and North Korean negotiating teams. After one day, the North Koreans said that talks had broken down, blaming US inflexibility. The US team, however, said discussions were good, and would be resumed.

On December 7, 2019, a spokesman for North Korea's Defense Academy announced that an important test had been conducted at the Sohae Satellite Launching Station, but no details were forthcoming.

In December 2019, US Ambassador to the United Nations Kelly Craft said during a meeting of the UN Security Council that was called at her request that the US was prepared to take "simultaneous steps" with North Korea to achieve peace. But she also warned the North Koreans against conducting further missile tests.

== Aftermath ==
In May 2020, saying he intended to employ "new policies", Kim met with the Central Military Commission of the Workers' Party and discussed boosting North Korea's nuclear deterrent. The augmentation of conventional artillery was discussed as well. On June 5, 2020, the North Korean foreign minister Ri Son-gwon said that prospects for peace between North and South Korea, and the U.S., had "faded away into a dark nightmare". He indicated that subsequent to the meeting with Trump, the North's efforts had focused instead on amassing a more "reliable force to cope with the long-term military threats from the U.S.". On June 13, Kim Yo Jong, sister of Kim Jong Un, warned that "before long, a tragic scene of the useless North-South joint liaison office completely collapsed would be seen". On June 16, the North threatened to return troops that had been withdrawn from the border to posts where they had been previously stationed. Later that day, the liaison office in Kaesong was blown up by the North Korean government. Due to the COVID-19 pandemic, the South Korean delegation had left the building in January.

In September, Moon and Kim exchanged friendly letters about COVID-19 and the typhoons that had hit Korea. On 22 September, Moon addressed the UN General Assembly and called for a "permanent peace regime" in Korea. Kelly Craft, the US ambassador to the UN, backed his call and said that there had been significant progress in negotiations so far. On the same day, the crew of a North Korean patrol boat killed a South Korean fisheries officer whom they encountered off their coast and torched his flotation device. Kim apologized to South Korea for the incident. In November, the South Korean defense ministry reaffirmed its commitment to the peace process in an ASEAN security meeting.

In February 2021, South Korea continued to omit North Korea's "enemy" status from the South Korean military's White Paper after downgrading the status of Japan.

On March 24, 2022, North Korea broke a self-imposed moratorium and launched its first ICBM since 2017.

== See also ==
- Peace Treaty on Korean Peninsula
- Korean conflict
- North Korea and weapons of mass destruction
- Korean reunification
- North Korea–South Korea relations
- North Korea–United States relations
- Kim–Putin meetings
  - 2019 visit by Kim Jong Un to Russia
- Kim–Xi meetings
  - 2019 state visit by Xi Jinping to North Korea
- List of international trips made by Kim Jong Un
- List of North Korean missile tests
