= Pyongyang IV =

Photograph by Andreas Gurksy

Pyongyang IV (2007) by Andreas Gursky

Pyongyang IV is a color photograph created by German photographer Andreas Gursky in 2007. It is part of the series Pyongyang, consisting of seven photographs, digitally conceived, after his attendance at the Arirang Mass Games, that used to be held every year at the Rungrado 1st of May Stadium, in Pyongyang, the capital of North Korea, in tribute to the late Communist ruler Kim Il Sung.

== History and description ==
Gursky travelled to North Korea in 2007 to attend the annual Arirang Festival. The massive event consists in choreographed acrobatic performances of more than 50,000 gymnasts who act in front of 30,000 children holding play-cards to create a monumental human mosaic of several patterns as a background. This massive, controlled show illustrates the militaristic and totalitarian nature of the North Korean regimen. Gursky in this photograph follows the same approach to large sets that appear in many of his most known works, but instead of the western, capitalistic world, this time he takes aim to an event from a Communist regimen. In Pyongyang IV, Gursky adopts a towering format, that allows the display of several rows of dancers, who recede in horizontal waves. The perspective draws the viewer's attention to the globe that appears at mid-distance, presenting a North Korea-centered world. This massive spectacle recalls similar events that used to take place in the Communist world, like in the Soviet Union under Joseph Stalin, or in China during the time of Mao Tse-tung. There is no place for individuality in this show, instead it works like an eloquent metaphor for the masses subjugation under a Communist regimen. In this highly detailed image, however, the artist does show an instant of dissonance, only noticeable after a closer analysis: some dancers, beneath the globe, are out of syntony with those closer to them. Gursky also choose another detail; the screen in the background doesn't present the perfect tone of red, when the children are all in accordance, instead it shows some portions of white.

== Art market ==
Three prints of Pyongyang IV are amongst the most expensive photographs ever sold at the art market. A print was sold by $2,129,459 at Sotheby's, London, at 15 October 2010. Another one sold by $1,390,000 at Sotheby's, New York, at 11 November 2015. Previously, a print had been sold by $1,375,000, also at Sotheby's, New York, at 14 February 2008.

== Public collections ==
A print of the photograph is held at The Broad, in Los Angeles.
