= Proposed Peace Treaty on the Korean Peninsula =

Proposed peace treaty for Korea

Peace Treaty on Korean Peninsula
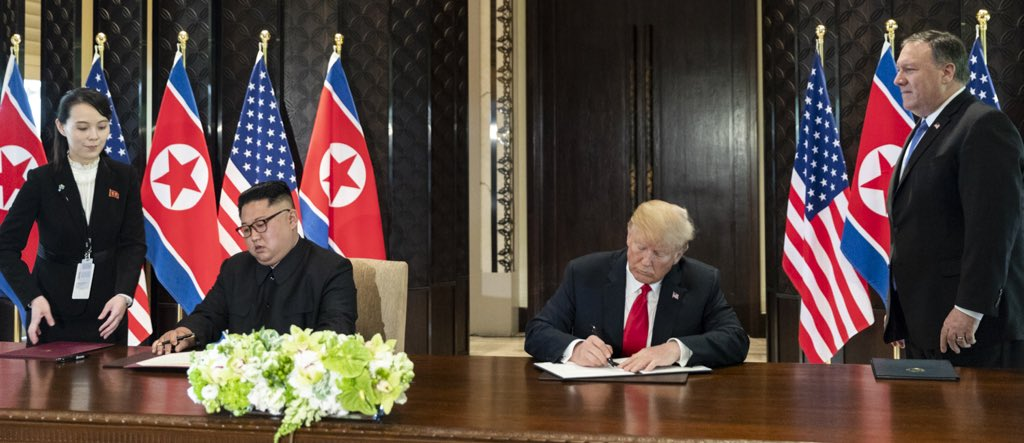
- Kim Jong Un and Donald Trump signing the Joint Statement during the 2018 Trump–Kim summit
- Date: June 12, 2018
- Location: Sentosa, Singapore
- Also known as: Normalization of relations between the North Korean and US governments
- Patrons: Kim Yo Jong, Mike Pompeo
- Organized by: Kim Jong Un; Moon Jae-in; Donald Trump; Xi Jinping
- Participants: North Korea; South Korea; United States; China
- Outcome: Temporarily improved relations between US and North Korea

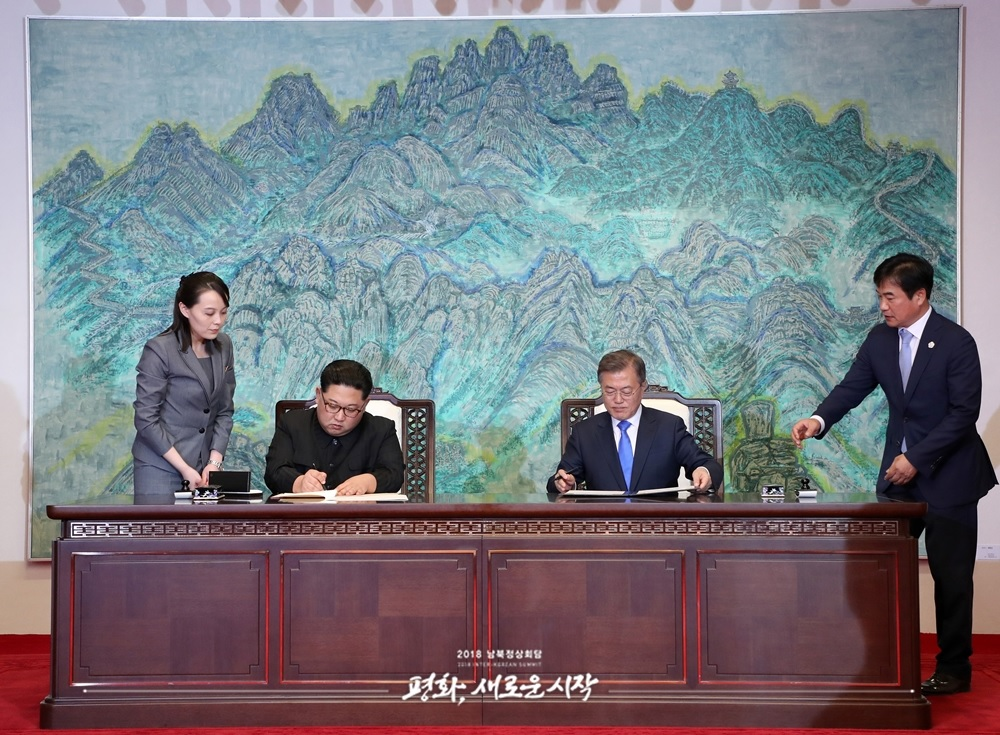
Kim Jong Un and Moon Jae-in signing the Panmunjom Declaration

The Peace Treaty on Korean Peninsula is a proposed settlement to formally end military hostilities on the Korean Peninsula as a follow-up to the 1953 Korean Armistice Agreement implemented by the United Nations after the Korean War. During the inter-Korean summit on April 27, 2018, Kim Jong Un and Moon Jae-in signed the Panmunjom Declaration; the declaration involved an agreement about mutual efforts and action items for transforming the armistice agreement into a peace treaty with the cooperation of the United States and China. During the 2018 Trump–Kim summit, US president Donald Trump and Kim signed a Joint Statement which reaffirmed the Panmunjom Declaration. On November 23, 2023, North Korea terminated its 2018 agreement with South Korea.

== Overview ==
US president Donald Trump and North Korean supreme leader Kim Jong Un agreed to speed up the denuclearization process on the Korean Peninsula by building a new relationship between the United States and North Korea, signing a Joint Statement on June 12, 2018. Kim asked the US to formally end the Korean War (1950–1953) to finalize the denuclearization schedule. In the past, with the advancement of North Korea's nuclear and missile program, the US had considered a military option or diplomatic negotiations with North Korea to secure its denuclearization.

There is ongoing mediation with the two Koreas, the US, and China about formally ending the Korean War. Although North and South Korea prefer declaring the end of the war first, China advocates a peace treaty which would be legally binding on all parties. The US favors a bilateral statement with North Korea in anticipation of Chinese concerns about the presence of United States Forces Korea (USFK). Russian president Vladimir Putin, who reconfirmed the peace treaty with Japan ending World War II, said that North Korea's nuclear issue should be resolved in "a political and diplomatic manner". Russia's Ministry of Foreign Affairs endorsed the Panmunjom Declaration. Putin suggested that Trump halt US-South Korean joint military exercises during a 2017 diplomatic gathering in Germany, and Trump agreed to suspend "war games" with South Korea during the Trump–Kim summit in 2018.

== Proposed conditions ==
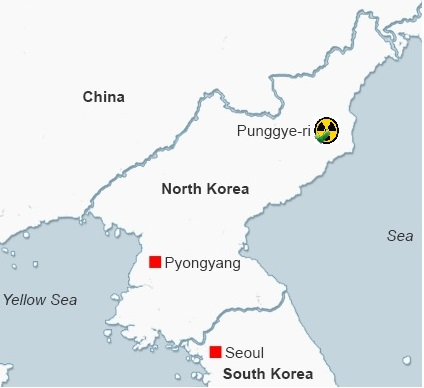
North Korea shut down its Punggye-ri Nuclear Test Site on 23 May 2018 to demonstrate its commitment to denuclearization.

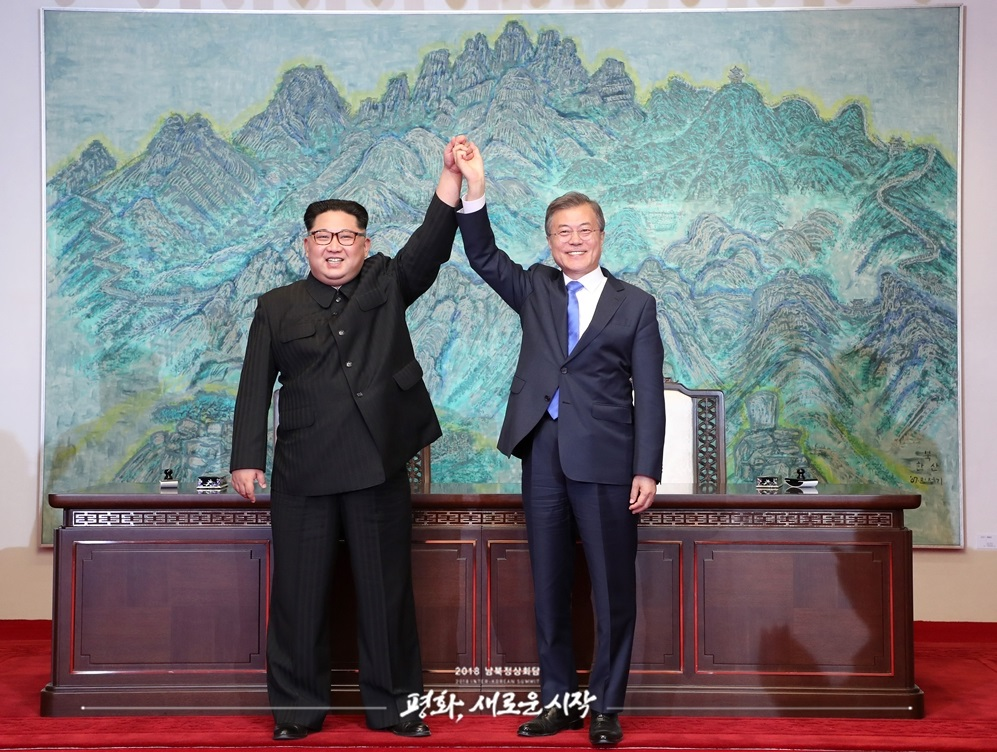
Kim and Moon after signing the Panmunjom Declaration

According to Robert Gallucci, the 1994-Agreed Framework set a precedent for resolving North Korea's nuclear and military issues. University of Southern California Korean Studies Institute director and professor of international relations David C. Kang scrutinized previous efforts to resolve the nuclear issues, based on years of US–North Korean negotiations. The United States favors North Korean denuclearization before any security agreements, and North Korea refuses to give up its nuclear weapons before a security agreement is reached.

Robert Einhorn, a former special advisor for nonproliferation and arms control at the United States Department of State, suggested an alternative approach to Washington. Einhorn interpreted the solution of DPRK's denuclearisation which is favored by North Korea. In his view, some corresponding reward should be given to Pyongyang matching each of Pyongyang's denuclearization steps until full dismantlement of the DPRK nuclear program. In summary it's a step-by step, incremental, phased approach toward North Korea.

On December 11, 2019, during a U.N. Security Council meeting, U.S. Ambassador to the United Nations Kelly Craft announced that the U.S. was ready "to simultaneously take concrete steps" with a flexible approach, for a 'balanced agreement" of the nuclear deal with DPRK.

== History ==
The United States has attempted to secure the denuclearization of North Korea because of North Korea's nuclear testing and the development of ICBM technology capable of reaching the United States. Before World War II, Korea was united for over a thousand years and known as Goryeo and Joseon. After colonisation by Japan from 1910 to 1945, Korea was divided into two countries along the 38th parallel (now the Korean Demilitarized Zone). North Korea was administered by the Soviet Union in the years immediately after the war, and South Korea was administered by the United States. North Korea invaded South Korea in 1950, beginning the Korean War. The war ended in a 1953 stalemate.

After the war, despite South Korean president Syngman Rhee's disagreement with the United States' pursuit of a ceasefire with China and the separation of North and South Korea under US-led United Nations intervention, the two Koreas were divided on July 27, 1953. After the 1954 Geneva Conference, Rhee hoped for reunification under the United Nations before his resignation in 1960.

On May 16, 1961, Park Chung-hee seized power in a South Korean military coup. During the decade, Korean reunification was advocated to revive the economies of both countries. During the 1970s, with the success of détente and Korean economic development, the countries resumed negotiations. The July 4th North–South Korea Joint Statement was drawn up, but not implemented. South Korea was governed by the Yushin Constitution, and the impetus for reunification on the peninsula ended.

On August 5, 2017, General Secretary of the Chinese Communist Party Xi Jinping called for Donald Trump to resolve the North Korean nuclear issue through a peaceful resolution based on mutual respect between the nations in the face of heightened military tensions. At the 2017 G20 summit the previous month, Xi reaffirmed discussion of the peninsula's peace settlement.

On September 3, 2017, North Korea tested a thermonuclear weapon. The bomb was later estimated at 250 kilotons, based on a further study of seismic data. Relations between North and South Korea have improved somewhat since then, beginning with North Korea's participation in the 2018 Winter Olympics in South Korea.

== Reactions ==
=== United States ===
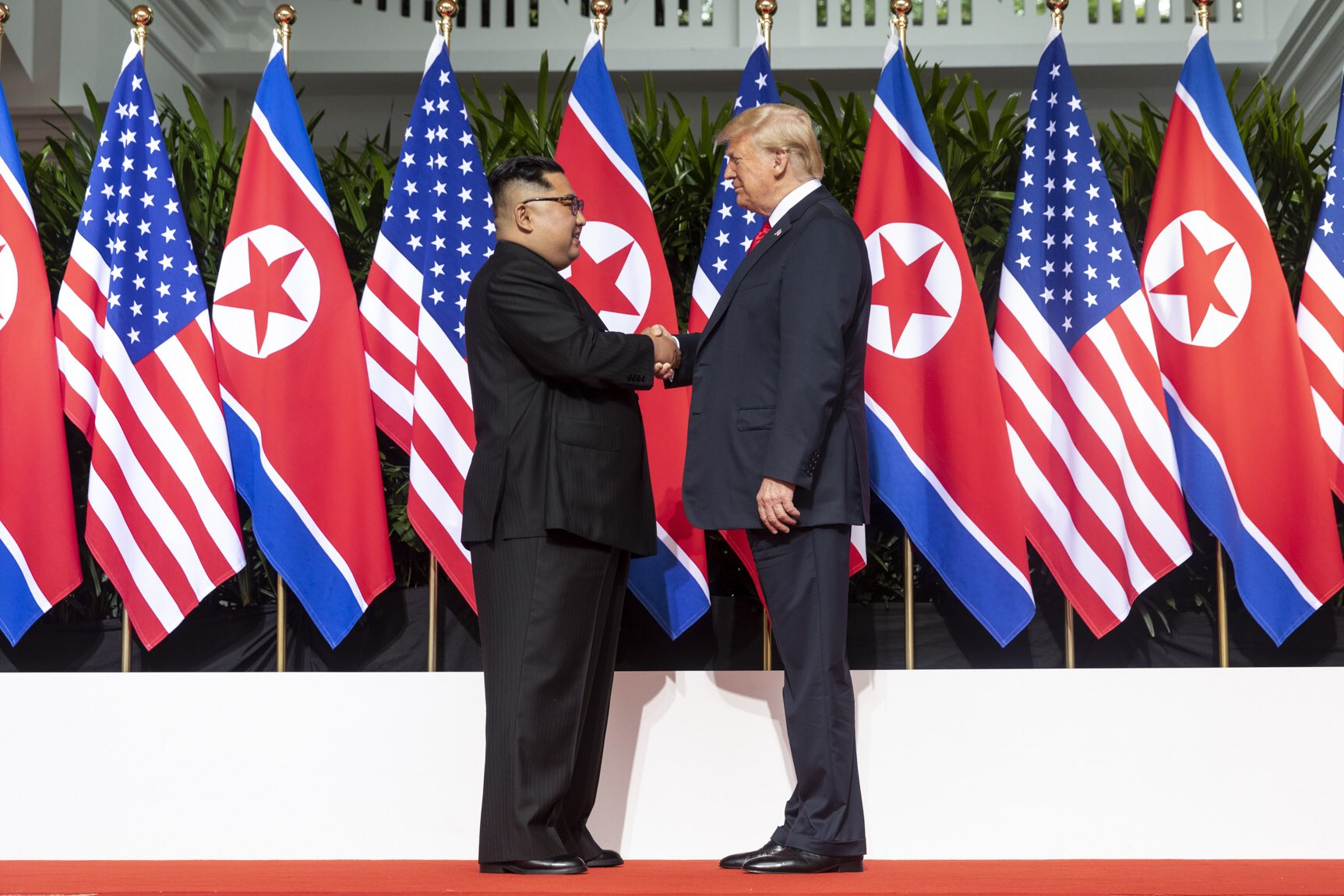
Kim and Trump shake hands during the 2018 Singapore summit

About the dismantling of a North Korean nuclear site, South Korean Foreign Minister Kang Kyung-wha said in October 2018 that she would like US Secretary of State Mike Pompeo to agree to a declaration ending the Korean War as part of security guarantees to increase North Korean confidence in a denuclearization agreement. Although Pompeo said that he was pleased to negotiate with Kim Jong Un about dismantling nuclear facilities at the Yongbyon Nuclear Scientific Research Center, he hesitated to express an opinion on the possibility of an "end-of-Korean war declaration".

According to a Washington Post analysis, sufficient momentum exists for a declaration ending the Korean War as a useful tool for the Trump administration to speed up North Korea's denuclearization. The declaration would be a symbolic diplomatic measure, requiring fewer judicial obstacles than a peace treaty. Another factor making a declaration more timely is the warming relationship between the two Koreas as a result of several inter-Korean summits. CNN reported that the Trump administration is willing to end the Korean War to denuclearize North Korea.

=== South Korea ===
The White House was petitioned about a peace treaty on the Korean Peninsula on March 15, 2018, and the petition received the required number of signatures within a month. Regarding a third inter-Korean summit and a permanent peace solution on the Korean Peninsula, about 83 percent of the South Korean people support a diplomatic solution. According to South Korean president Moon Jae-in, the Korean War will end sooner rather than later. Moon is trying to persuade Kim Jong Un to give up his nuclear program and weapons by showing him a brighter economic future with South Korean cooperation. In the context of the peace process, reunification of the Korean Peninsula is a strategic agenda that the current South Korean government has been focusing on. In particular, President Park Geun-hye, who preceded President Moon Jae-in, emphasized the importance of reunification, making a related comment that a single Korea "would be a great benefit for neighboring countries". This has been a hot topic for both the ruling and opposition parties in the government.

=== North Korea ===
KCNA said in a commentary that there would be "such... steps as eternal dismantlement" of its DPRK nuclear complex "if the US takes a corresponding measure". North Korean leader Kim Jong Un mentioned several positive implications of reunification between South and North Korea. In Pyongyang during the Arirang Mass Games-2018 Festival, South Korean President Moon Jae-in delivered a seven-minute speech to a crowd of more than 150,000 people, urging the two Koreas to take a giant step toward denuclearization and lasting peace. South Korean President Moon Jae-in's speech about his vision of a unified Korea may have resonated with his North Korean audience, according to Andrei Abrahamian, a fellow at the Pacific Forum. The Korean War is over. This can be interpreted to mean that Kim Jong Un, the first North Korean leader to visit South Korea, 'created new history.' To end 70 years of war, North Korea agreed to end the Korean War through peace talks.

=== United Kingdom ===
The British Government advised circumspect travel to North Korea as of December 21, 2018. It summarized the current political situation on Korean peniunsula. For example, the increasing tension on the Korean Peninsula became worse in 2017 due to a series of nuclear and ICBM missile tests. On 12 June, there was a meeting between US President Donald Trump and North Korea's leader Kim Jong Un. The Panmunjom Declaration signed during the inter-Korean summit on 27 April pledged to consent to a peace treaty to officially end the Korean War 1950-53 by the end of 2018. They requested the British citizens who are living in North Korea or those who decided to travel there independently to notify the British embassy in Pyongyang about their travel plans before, or on arrival.

=== Mongolia ===
Mongolia as a country that transitioned from communism to democracy, it hoped to support a unified Republic of Korea for peace and development in Northeast Asia, and held opinions at the Ulaanbaatar Dialogue (UB) and Mongolian Forum in June 2023. At the Mongolian Ulaanbaatar Dialogue, the importance of cooperation in Northeast Asia was emphasized in a situation where the number of nuclear-armed countries and tensions between the United States, China, North and South Korea, and China-Taiwan are increasing. The 'Ulaanbaatar Dialogue', an international conference on security in Northeast Asia, is held by the Mongolian government, attendees of the U.S.A, Russia, China, Japan, DPRK (North Korea), ROK (South Korea), Germany, France and the Netherlands. 30-35 countries and 10 international organizations participated and the event was held from 2013 to 2023, except for 2020 and 2021 as per Covid-19.

=== Timeline ===
==== 2018 ====
In March 2018, Kyodo News reported that Chinese leader Xi Jinping suggested a Korean peace treaty to Donald Trump in a phone conversation and emphasised that four countries (the US, South and North Korea, and China) should be included. Xi and Moon Jae-in agreed on mutual efforts to bring about a positive change to conditions surrounding the Korean Peninsula after the April 2018 inter-Korean summit.

On April 16, 2018, Trump met with Japanese Prime Minister Shinzo Abe at Mar-a-Lago. Trump announced that Japan and the US had a shared objective in resolving the North Korea issue, saying that the Korean War had not yet ended but endorsing its end. He tweeted on 27 April, "KOREAN WAR TO END! The United States, and all of its GREAT people, should be very proud of what is now taking place in Korea!" The president promised to work with Moon to pressure North Korea into abandoning its ICBM and nuclear-weapons programs, which have caused anxiety in the Asia-Pacific region for years.

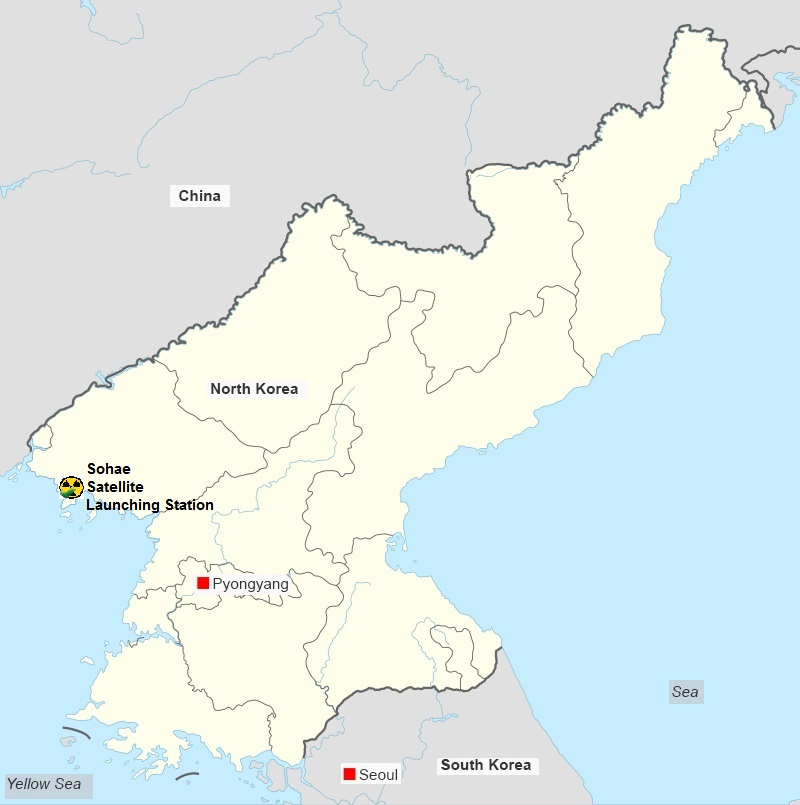
North Korea dismantled the Sohae Satellite Launching Station.

In an April 29 Fox News interview, US Senate Committee on Armed Services member Lindsey Graham said that North Korea could reach the US with nuclear weapons; given the threat of retaliation, however, they should negotiate their nuclear program and the Kim government's safety, stability and economic development. According to Graham, the nuclear deal with Iran was useless; Iran enriches their nuclear fuel without third-party inspection, and could quickly develop atomic weapons. An agreement with North Korea should include verification of their nuclear program.

In a June 1 CNBC interview about a meeting with North Korean aide Kim Yong Chol at the White House, Trump said that he did not like North Korea's meeting with Russia but it was time to end the war. Former Trump adviser Sebastian Gorka defended Trump's rhetoric in a June 12 Fox Business Network, after the Trump-Kim summit.

It was reported on July 24 that North Korea was dismantling a nuclear rocket-launching and test site near Tongchang-ri, as Kim had promised during the 2018 Trump–Kim summit. Moon called the move "a good sign for North Korea's denuclearization" and "Kim Jong Un's sincerity". Three days later, Korean Council for Reconciliation and Cooperation chairman Kim Hong-gul expressed Pyongyang's eagerness to sign a declaration ending the war and its willingness to speed up denuclearization based on mutual trust between the US and North Korea. Although North Korea had wanted a peace treaty, an "end-of-war declaration" would be the first step towards speedier denuclearization.

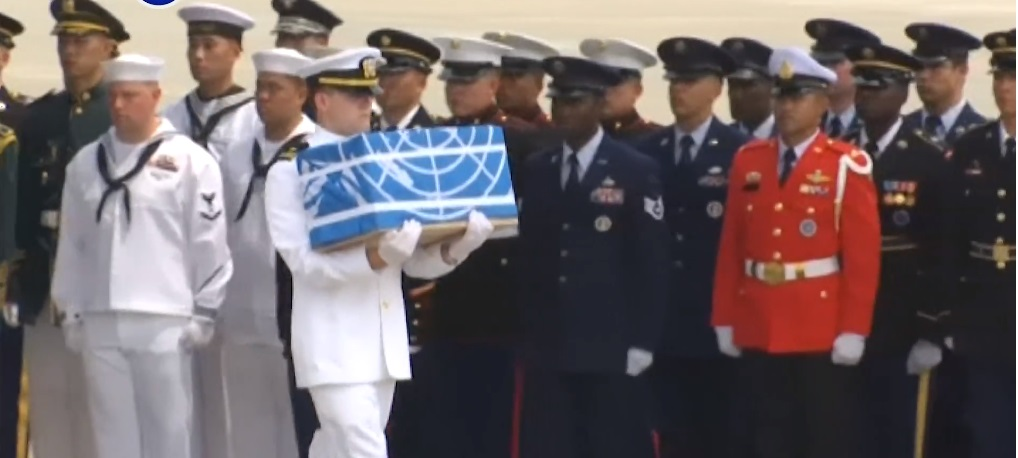
After the 2018 Singapore summit, North Korea returned the remains of US POWs and MIAs. The remains were brought from the eastern city of Wonsan to Osan Air Base, near Seoul.

That day, the 65th anniversary of the Korean War armistice, North Korea returned the remains of 55 American military-service members who were killed during the Korean War to the United States. The Korean Central News Agency was silent on the return of the remains. According to Center for the National Interest director of defense studies, Trump should respond to the goodwill gesture with a bold move. Although a comprehensive denuclearization agreement was made during the Trump-Kim summit, a peace treaty would be a crucial condition for North Korea to give up their nuclear arsenal and ICBM program. The US would not lose face, since the Korean War ended 65 years ago and that declaration should have been finalized decades ago.

On August 4, during the Association of Southeast Asian Nations (ASEAN) Regional Forum 2018, North Korea's nuclear program was the main agenda item. ASEAN foreign ministers issued a joint statement calling for "complete denuclearization", a change from 2017's call for "complete, verifiable and irreversible denuclearization". South Korean foreign minister Kang Kyung-wha said that she had "considerable" consultation about the declaration with her Chinese and US counterparts. According to Chinese foreign minister Wang Yi, "Everyone can announce a declaration ending the war if they do not want the war to happen again". North Korean foreign minister Ri Yong-ho said that he was "alarmed" by US insistence on maintaining sanctions until denuclearization and what he said was US reluctance to declare a formal end to the Korean War. USFK maintains several nuclear bomber fighters, and North Korea demanded a US safety guarantee in exchange for giving up their nuclear-weapons program. North Korea wants a second Trump–Kim summit to resolve the gridlocked security guarantee-denuclearization negotiations. A second summit was reportedly possible before the end of 2018.

==== 2019 ====
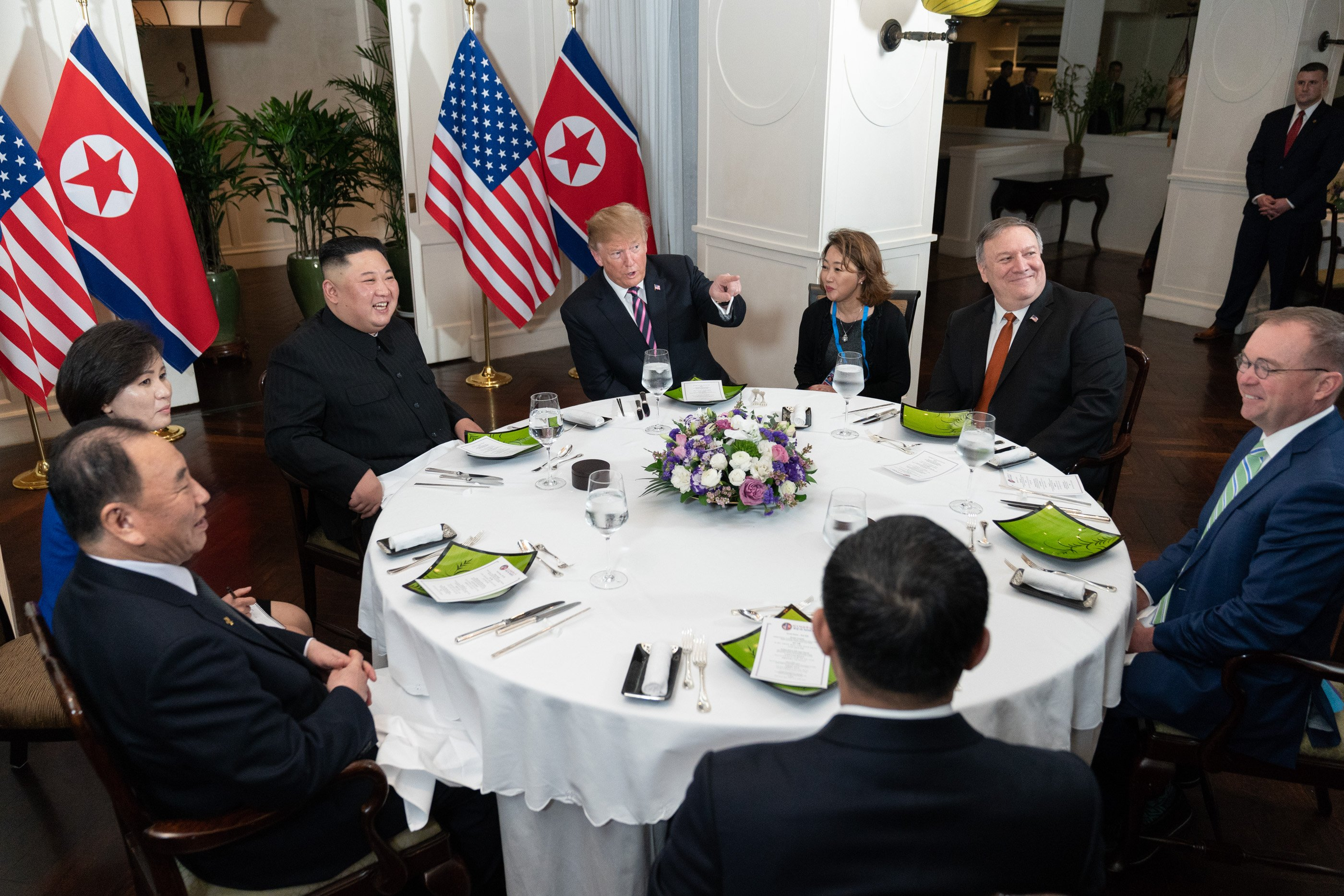
U.S. President Donald Trump and North Korean Leader Kim Jong Un having dinner, along with their delegation

On February 27–28, 2019, the North Korea–United States Summit in Hanoi was held. Kim Jong Un departed from Pyongyang on February 23, according to images released by the KCNA news agency. It was 4,500 kilometres (2,800 mi) one way trip took about 60 hours. The train arrived in Đồng Đăng railway station of the Vietnamese border city of Đồng Đăng on Tuesday February 26, and Kim traveled to Hanoi by vehicle. U.S president Donald Trump met with Kim Jong Un on February 27–28, 2019, in Hanoi, Vietnam, in the second summit meeting between the leaders of the United States and North Korea. On February 28, 2019, the White House published that the summit was cut short and that no deal was reached, with Trump later elaborating that it was because North Korea wanted an end to all sanctions. On the other hand, North Korean Foreign Minister Ri Yong-ho stated that the country only sought a partial lifting of five United Nations sanctions placed on North Korea during 2016–17.

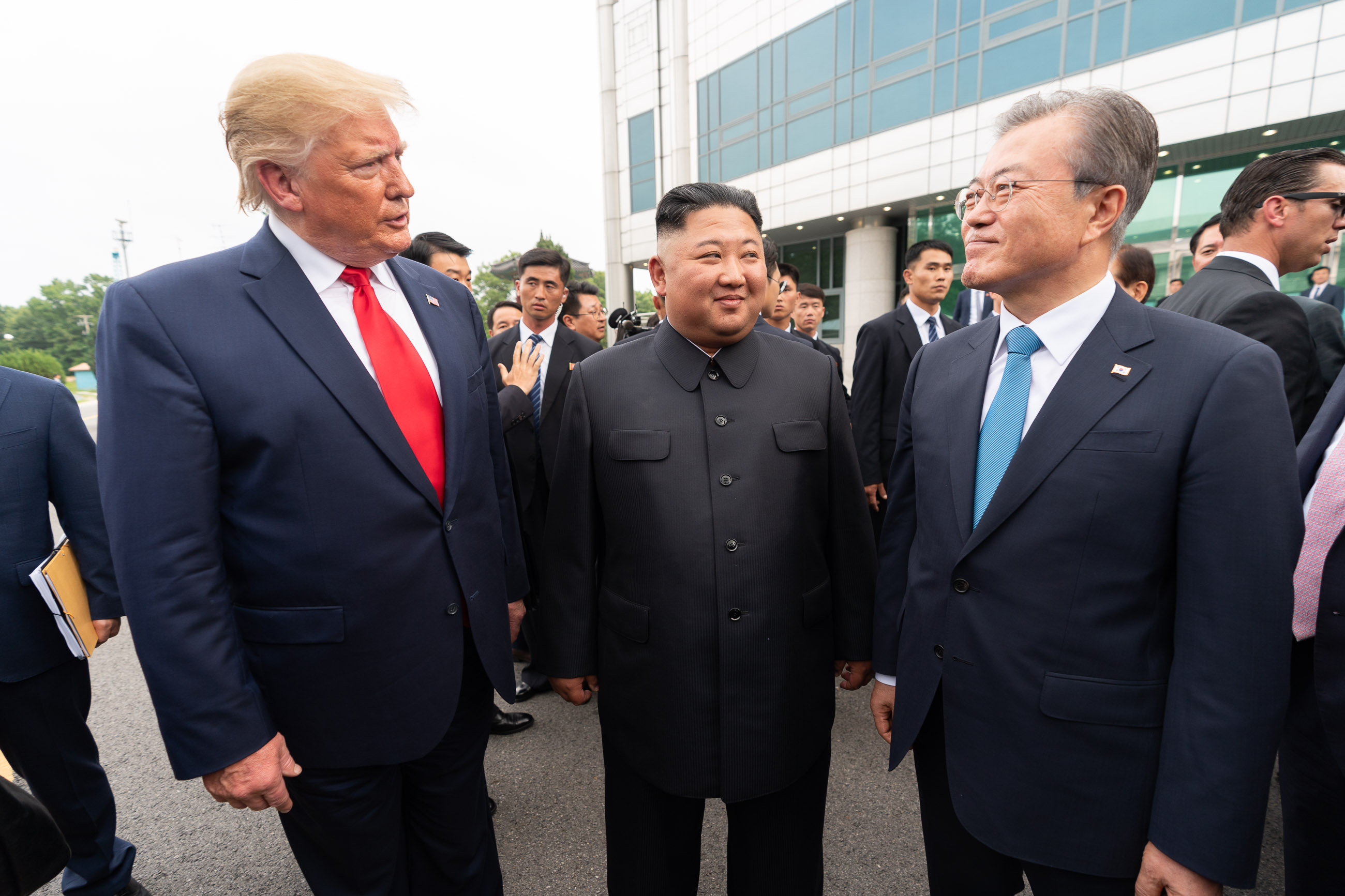
U.S. President Donald Trump, South Korean President Moon Jae-in, and North Korean Leader Kim Jong Un chatting at the Joint Security Area during KOREAS-U.S. DMZ summit 2019

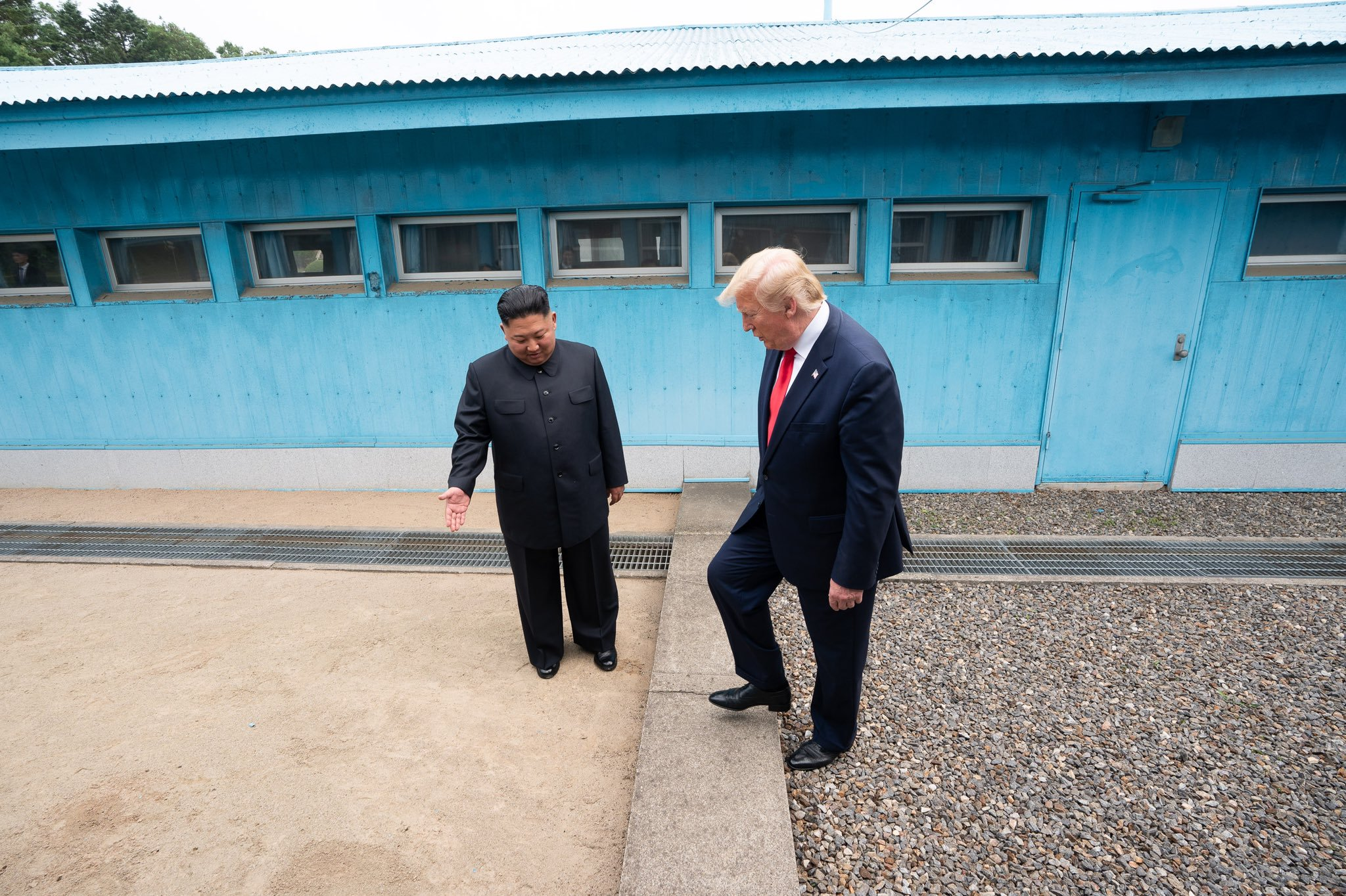
During KOREAS-U.S. DMZ summit Trump stepping into the North Korean territory by crossing the low stone curb separating the North and South at 3:45 p.m. KST

About the end of March, which was one month after the summit ended, Reuters revealed that on the second day of the summit U.S. president passed DPRK Kim a note that bluntly called for North Korea to surrender all its nuclear weapons and fuel, in similar fashion to the “Libya model,” a proposal the North Koreans had repeatedly rejected. The scheduled ceremonial luncheon was then abruptly canceled and the summit ended. Dr. Chiew-Ping Hoo, a professor at the National University of Malaysia, said that the negotiations at the Hanoi summit changed the minute John Bolton was added at the eleventh-hour to the panel. He advised to change the goal-post from the YongByon Nuclear site, to add other sites that produced weapons of mass destruction. Trump had to agree with Bolton's advice due to U.S. domestic issues, which resulted in a no-deal outcome for the summit. According to Jenny Town, Washington based, think-tank and North Korean expert, "it's Bolton's proposal in 2004, has been rejected more than once and, to bring it up again… would rather be insulting.” She also said that the US should have learned that this wasn't effective diplomacy, and shows they haven't learned how to properly negotiate.

Former special assistant to President Ronald Reagan, and a senior fellow at the Cato Institute, Doug Bandow, said that President Trump was unrealistically demanding that North Korean leader Kim Jong Un dismantle all his nuclear facilities, whereas Kim was only agreeing to shutting down the YongByon Nuclear facility in exchange for a partial lifting of a few UN sanctions against his country. Asking continuously for an unrealistic "all nukes for all sanctions deal" is deemed as malicious in its intent and illogical. Douglas Dillon Professor of Government at the Harvard Kennedy School, and former director of Harvard's Belfer Center, Graham T. Allison, believes that the Hanoi summit is not a whole failure, despite some public opinion, and even compared this to the Reagan-Gorbachev era. President Reagan also had to deal with negative public opinion regarding his dealings with the USSR, but he was able to remove all of the Soviet Union's intermediate nuclear-armed missiles with an INF deal. Compared to the USSR, North Korea is also communist country, but President Trump was able to deal with the top leader of North Korea, Kim Jong Un, something neither Bush nor Obama were able to do in their combined 16- year term. According to Abby Bard, a research associate for Asia policy at the Center for American Progress, President Trump's and Kim's teams need critical space between them to build trust and verify the intentions between the two parties. Working level meetings between both teams are needed to arrange the details that would result in bigger bargains without miscalculations and misunderstandings. In order for the two leaders to reach a deal, their diplomatic teams need to work together.

On September 10, Trump sacked the national security adviser John Bolton as he strongly disagreed with John Bolton's suggestion about applying Libyan model to North Korea nuclear deal and mentioning Muammar Gaddafi. However, Bolton himself claims he was not sacked but resigned. Donald Trump selected hostage negotiator of DPRK Robert C. O'Brien as the new U.S. national security adviser. Some of Senate Republicans including Lindsey Graham praised Mr Trump's pick and mentioned, He's got great negotiating skills, and "he would be a very sound policy adviser." North Korea envoy Stephen Biegun confirmed as deputy secretary of state as Pompeo's number two. While Pompeo was recognized as a protector of Trump, Biegun is unknown for his partisanship. From Dec 15 to 21, Biegun visited South Korea, Japan and China as nuclear tensions climb with North Korea.

On December 16, China and Russia proposed that the U.N. Security Council lift a ban on some parts of restrictions including DPRK exporting sea food, textiles and infrastructure projects. China's ambassador of U.N. announced that the current standoff was a failure to counter to “positive steps” taken by North Korea toward denuclearisation. A close U.S. ally, South Korea has also supported the official proposal of easing some sanctions to DPRK, and requested for diplomatic efforts to be focused on resuming nuclear talks.

==== 2020 ====
U.S. President Trump said to his advisers he doesn't want another summit with North Korea's leader Kim before the U.S. presidential election that year. It is understood that as Trump might be focused on his re-election campaign, his desire to engage on the nuclear issue has waned. Despite Trump's disinterest, the top foreign policy advisers were still trying to build a bridge of the nuclear deal between two leaders. National security adviser Robert C. O'Brien said "President Trump has shown both with the peace plan and what is right for the American people although it's unpopular, risky, right up until the day of the election." The US Special Representative to North Korea and the deputy secretary of state, Steve Biegun, have remained engaged in working-level talks with the DPRK. North Korea has slowed down its missile tests, but remains focused on its nuclear program. The foreign ministry adviser of DPRK, Kim Kye Gwan, mentioned that the personal relationship between two leaders is not enough to restart nuclear negotiations. Kim Jong Un declared that the DPRK would abandon its moratorium on nuclear and long-range ballistic missile tests and would soon introduce "a new strategic weapon" based on future "attitude" of the US.

==== 2023 ====
On November 23, 2023, North Korea terminated its 2018 agreement with South Korea, citing escalating military provocations, and plans to deploy military forces along the military demarcation line.

== See also ==
- 2018–19 Korean peace process
- April 2018 inter-Korean summit
- May 2018 inter-Korean summit
- September 2018 inter-Korean summit
- 2018 June DPRK-US Summit
- 2019 February DPRK-US Summit
- 2019 June DPRK-US meeting
- DPRK– Russia Summit
- Korean conflict
- Korean reunification
- Kim–Putin meetings
- Kim–Xi meetings
- List of international trips made by Kim Jong-un
