= Kim–Putin meetings =

Four meetings of North Korea's Kim Jong Un and Russia's Vladimir Putin

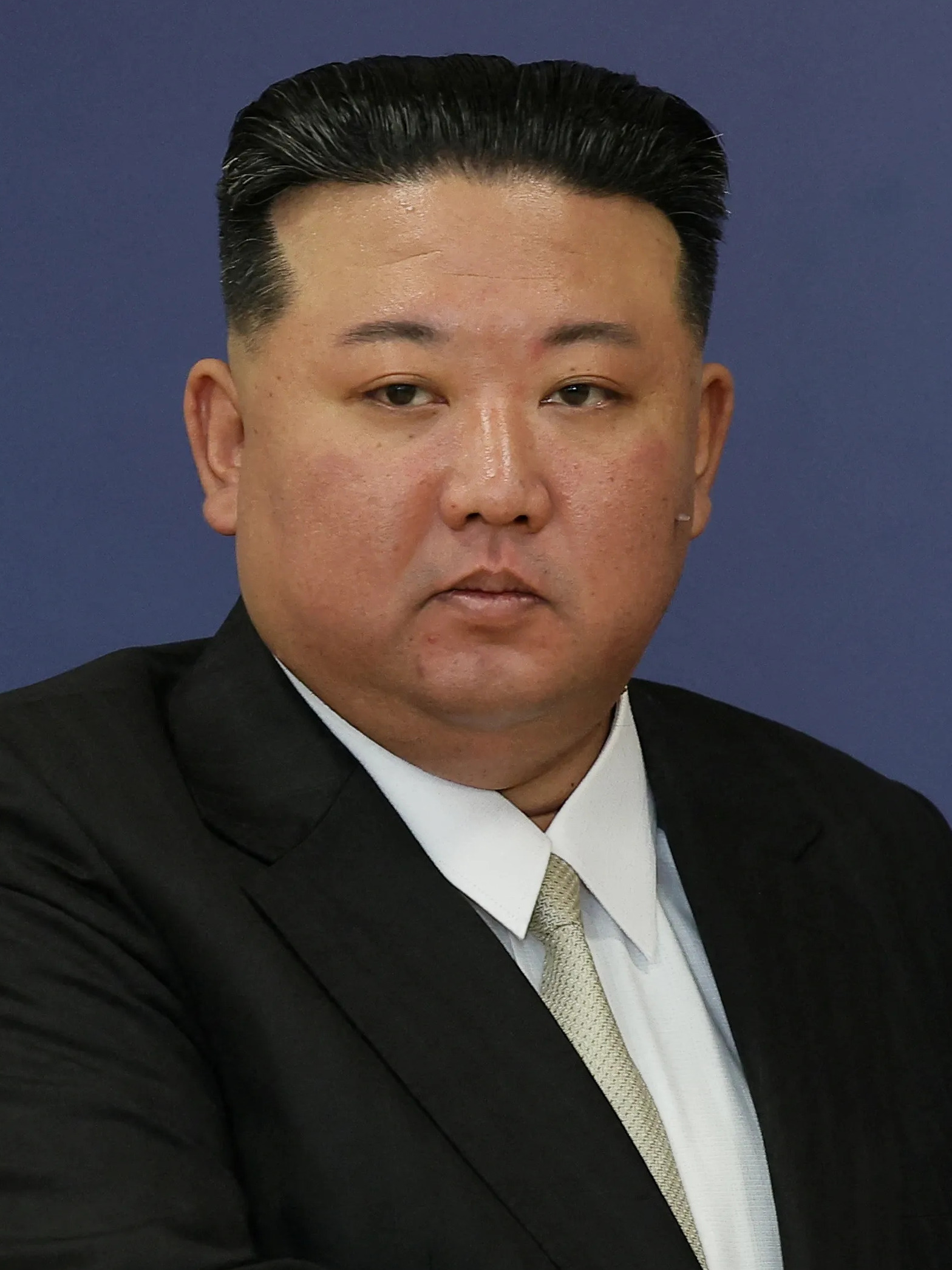
Meeting between General Secretary of the Workers' Party of Korea Kim Jong Un (left) and President of Russia Vladimir Putin (right)

The Kim–Putin meetings were a series of summits between North Korea and Russia during 2019, 2023, 2024 and 2025. North Korean leader Kim Jong Un met with Russian president Vladimir Putin in Vladivostok on April 25, 2019. Kim and Putin had a second meeting on September 13–17, 2023 in the city of Vostochny Cosmodrome, followed by a third official North Korea and Russia summit on June 19, 2024 in Pyongyang. In September 2025, Kim visited China to attend the 2025 Victory Day Parade, where he also met with CCP General Secretary Xi Jinping alongside Putin.

== First meeting (2019) ==
First meeting
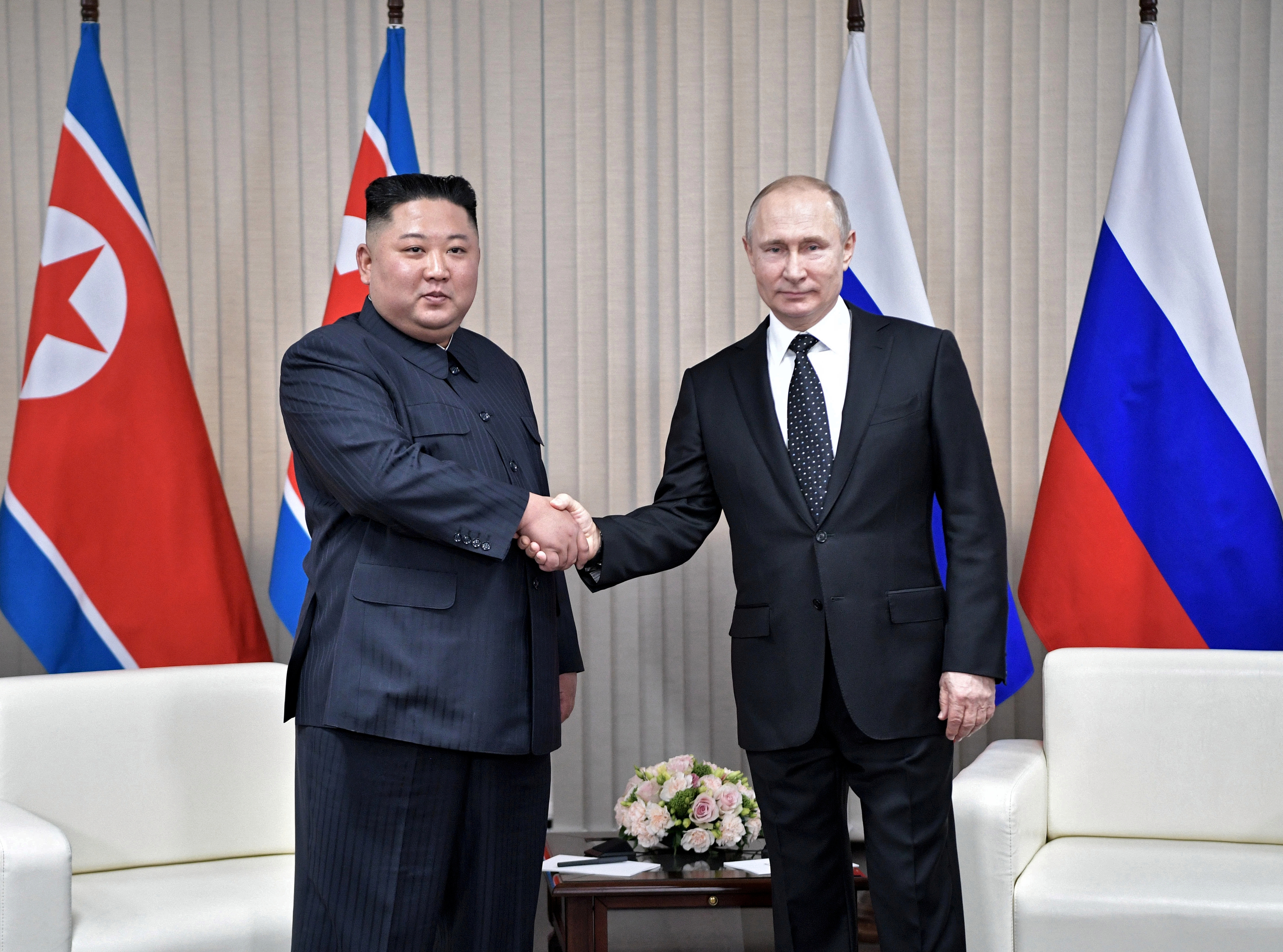
- Date: 25 April 2019
- Location: Vladivostok, Russia
- Participants: (Russia) Vladimir Putin (President) (North Korea) Kim Jong Un (Chairman)

On 25 April 2019, Chairman of the Workers' Party of Korea Kim Jong Un visited Russia. This was Kim's first official visit to Russia. The visit included a summit meeting between North Korea and Russia where Kim Jong Un met with Russian President Vladimir Putin, the first meeting between the two leaders.

== Second meeting (2023) ==
Second meeting
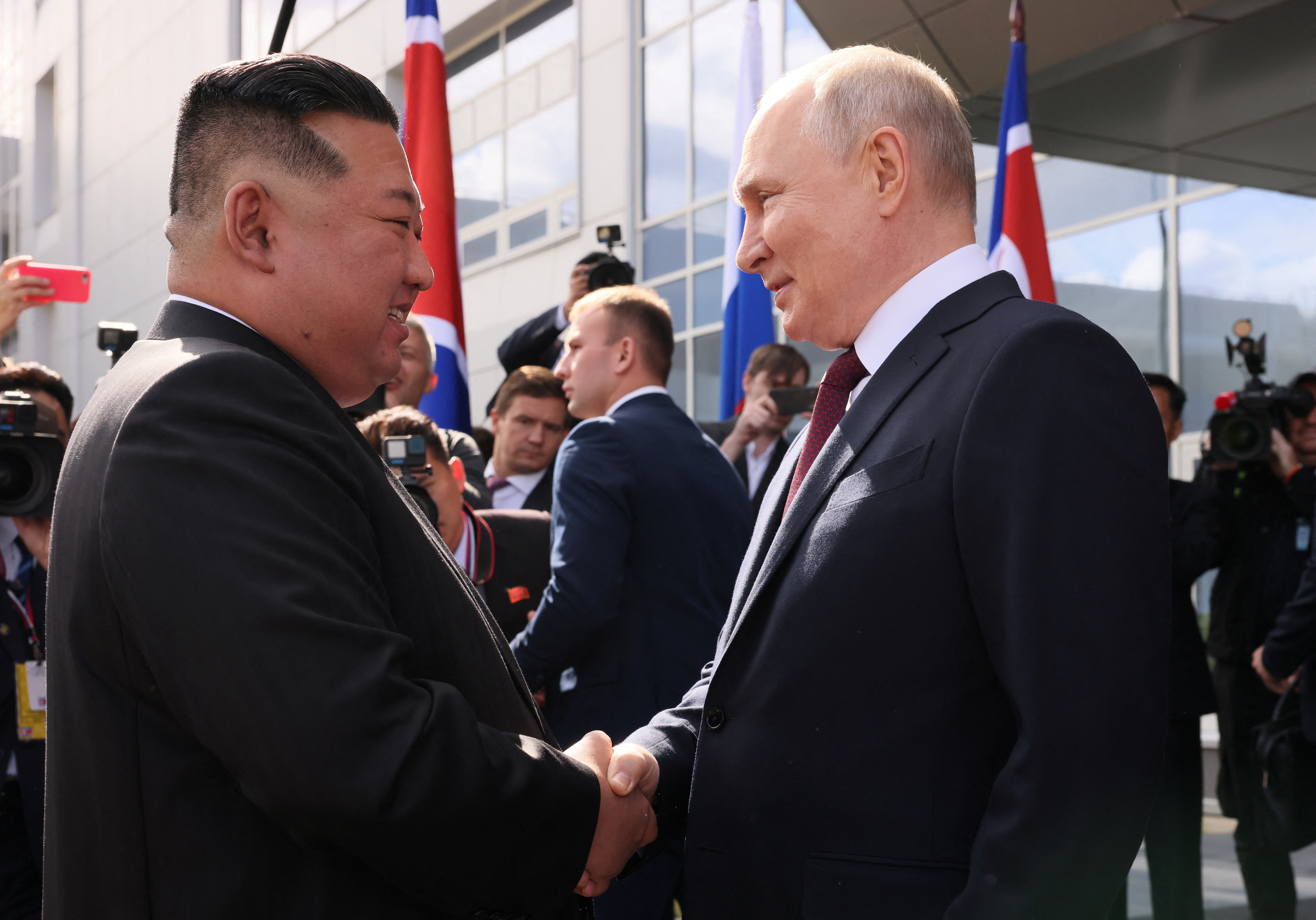
- Date: September 13–17, 2023
- Location: Vostochny Cosmodrome, Tsiolkovsky, Amur Oblast, Russia
- Participants: (Russia) Vladimir Putin (President) (North Korea) Kim Jong Un (General Secretary & President of the State Affairs)

On September 13–17, 2023, General Secretary of the Workers' Party of Korea Kim Jong Un visited Russia. This was Kim's first official visit overseas since the start of the COVID-19 pandemic in North Korea in 2020, and came after North Korea–Russia relations improved significantly following the 2022 Russian invasion of Ukraine.

The visit included a summit meeting between North Korea and Russia where Kim Jong Un met with Russian President Vladimir Putin on 13 September 2023. The meeting was held at the Vostochny Cosmodrome in the Russian Far East.

== Third meeting (2024) ==
Third meeting
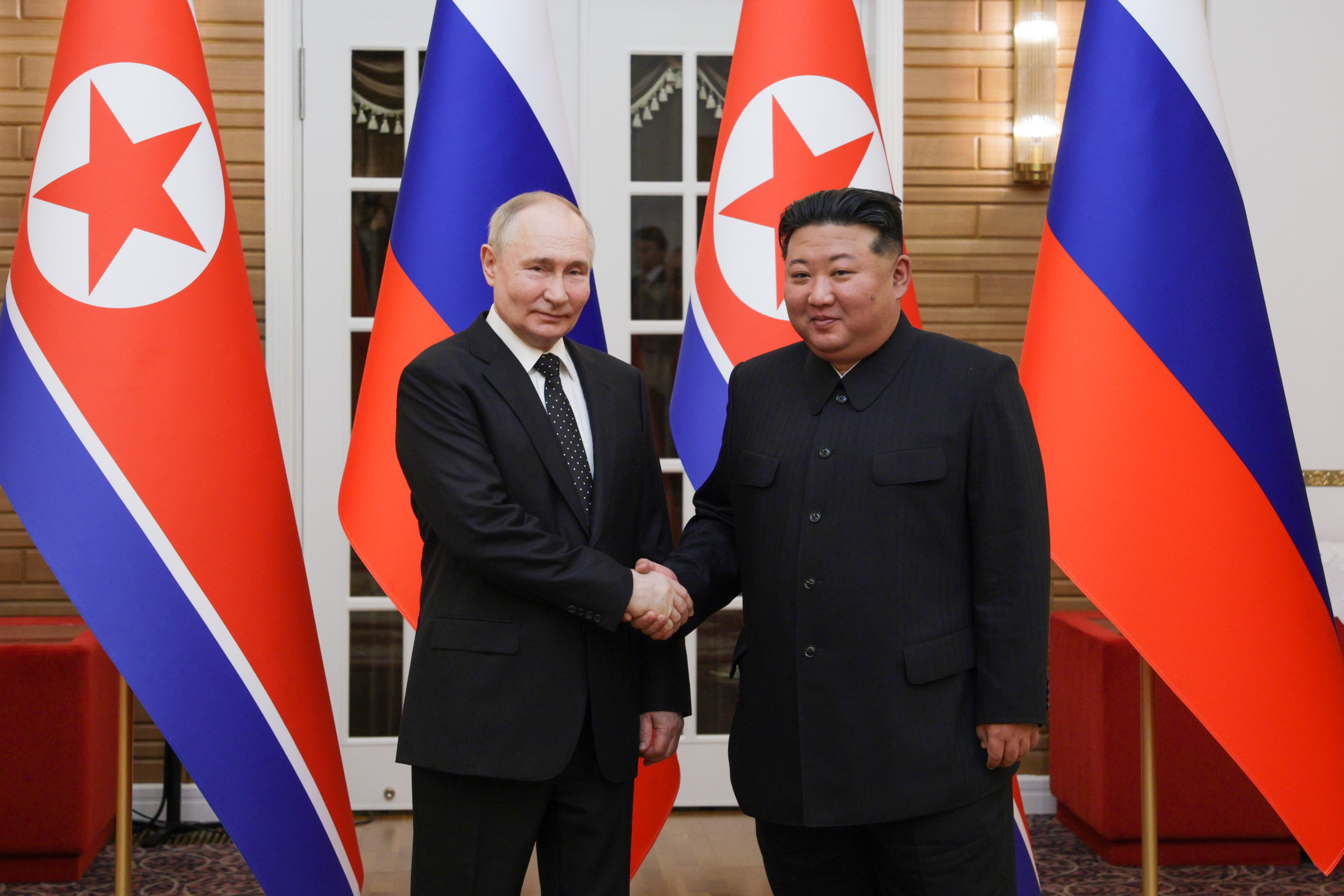
- Date: 19 June 2024
- Location: Pyongyang, North Korea
- Participants: (Russia) Vladimir Putin (President) (North Korea) Kim Jong Un (General Secretary & President of the State Affairs)

On June 19, 2024, Vladimir Putin, the president of Russia, visited North Korea. This was Putin's first official visit to North Korea since 2000, and came after North Korea–Russia relations improved significantly following the 2022 Russian invasion of Ukraine.

The visit included summit meeting between North Korea and Russia where North Korean leader Kim Jong Un met with Putin in Pyongyang, the capital of North Korea. This was the third meeting between the two leaders after the ones in 2019 and 2023. During the visit, the two leaders signed the North Korean–Russian Treaty on Comprehensive Strategic Partnership.

== Fourth meeting (2025) ==
Fourth meeting
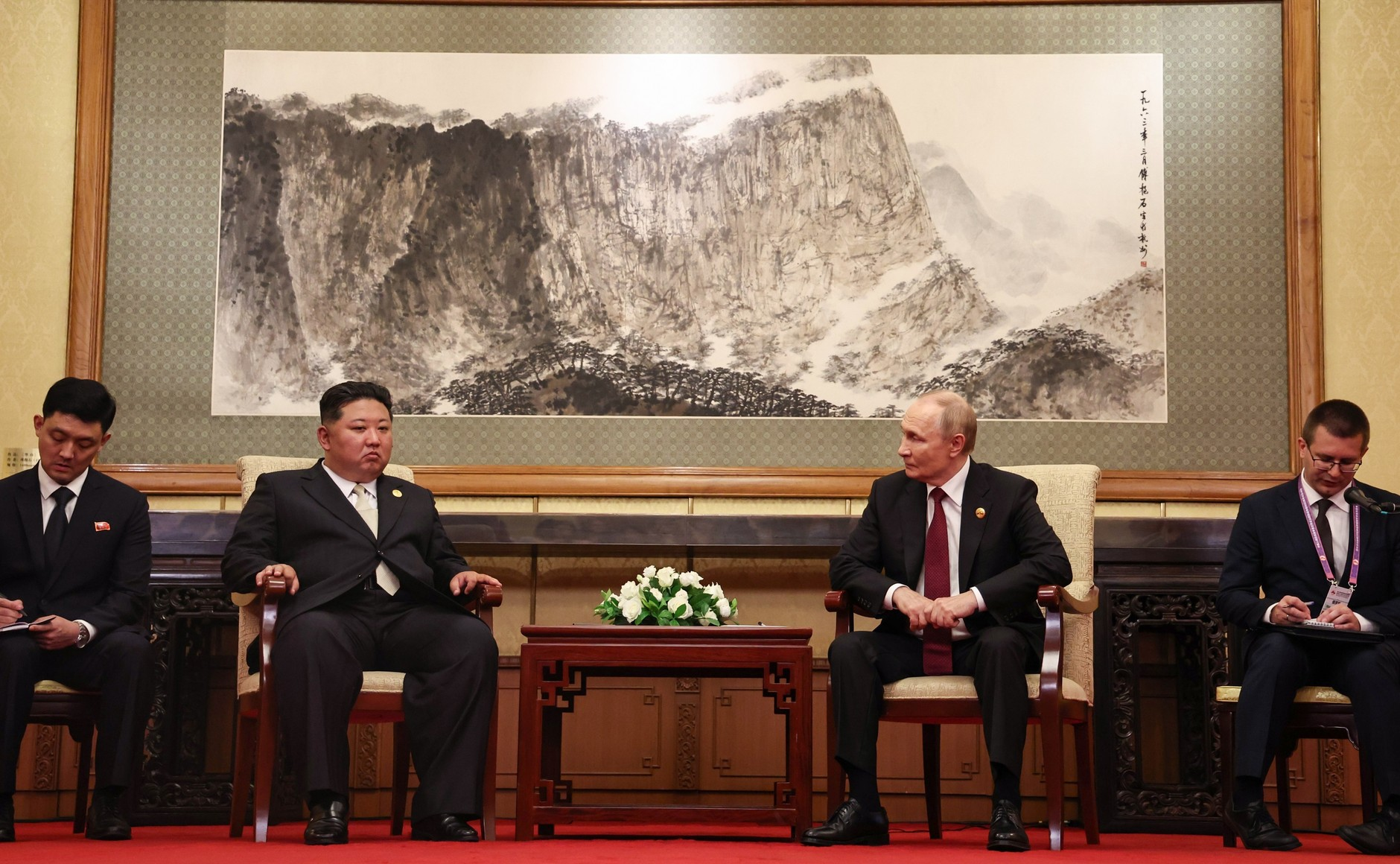
- Date: September 2–4, 2025
- Location: Beijing, China
- Participants: (Russia) Vladimir Putin (President) (North Korea) Kim Jong Un (General Secretary & President of the State Affairs)

On September 2, 2025, Kim Jong Un, accompanied by many other North Korean dignitaries, traveled to Beijing by special train to attend the 80th anniversary of the China Victory Day Parade, marking his first visit to China since 2019, as well as the first time he attended a multilateral event. At about 8:18 am on September 3, Kim Jong Un arrived at Duanmen Gate on the north side of Tiananmen Square to attend the military parade. During the visit, he met with CCP General Secretary Xi Jinping alongside Russian President Vladimir Putin.

== See also ==
- Russia–North Korea relations
- List of international trips made by Kim Jong Un
- List of international presidential trips made by Vladimir Putin
- Kim–Xi meetings, unofficial North Korea–China summit
