= Arirang Mass Games =

Mass gymnastics and artistic festival in North Korea

Arirang Mass Games 아리랑 축제
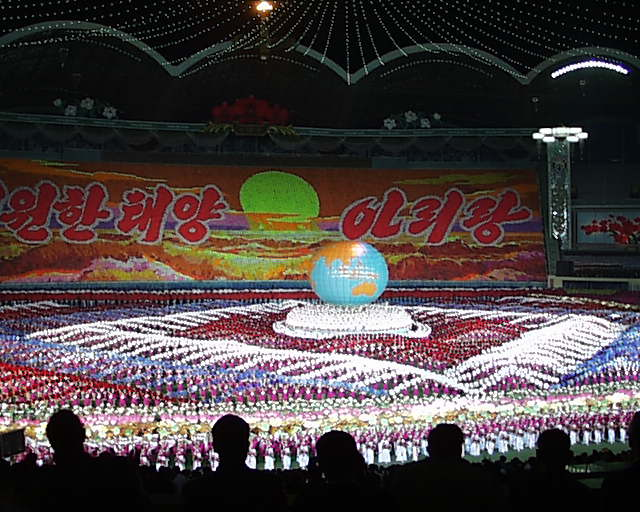
- Arirang Festival mass games display in Pyongyang, North Korea
- Status: Irregularly held, usually held every year
- Genre: Mass gymnastics, festival
- Frequency: Annually
- Venue: Rungrado 1st of May Stadium
- Locations: Pyongyang, North Korea
- Coordinates: 39°2′58.47″N 125°46′30.79″E
- Country: North Korea
- Years active: 2002–2013; 2018–2020; 2025

- Arirang Mass Games
- Hangul: 아리랑 축제
- Hanja: 아리랑 祝祭
- RR: Arirang chukje
- MR: Arirang ch'ukche

The Grand Mass Gymnastics and Artistic Performance Arirang (Korean: 아리랑 축제), also known as the Arirang Mass Games, or the Arirang Festival is a mass gymnastics and artistic festival held in the Rungrado 1st of May Stadium in Pyongyang, North Korea. The games usually take place in August or September. The Arirang Mass Games were held annually from 2002 to 2013 and 2018 to 2020 with the exception of some sporadic hiatuses in 2006, 2014 to 2017 and 2021 to 2024.

According to the TASS, "Arirang is a gymnastics and artistic festival, known as mass games. The extravaganza unfolds an epic story of how the Arirang nation of Korea, a country of morning calm, in the Orient put an end to the history of distress and rose as a dignified nation with the song 'Arirang'. The Arirang performance has been included in the Guinness Book of Records."

== History ==
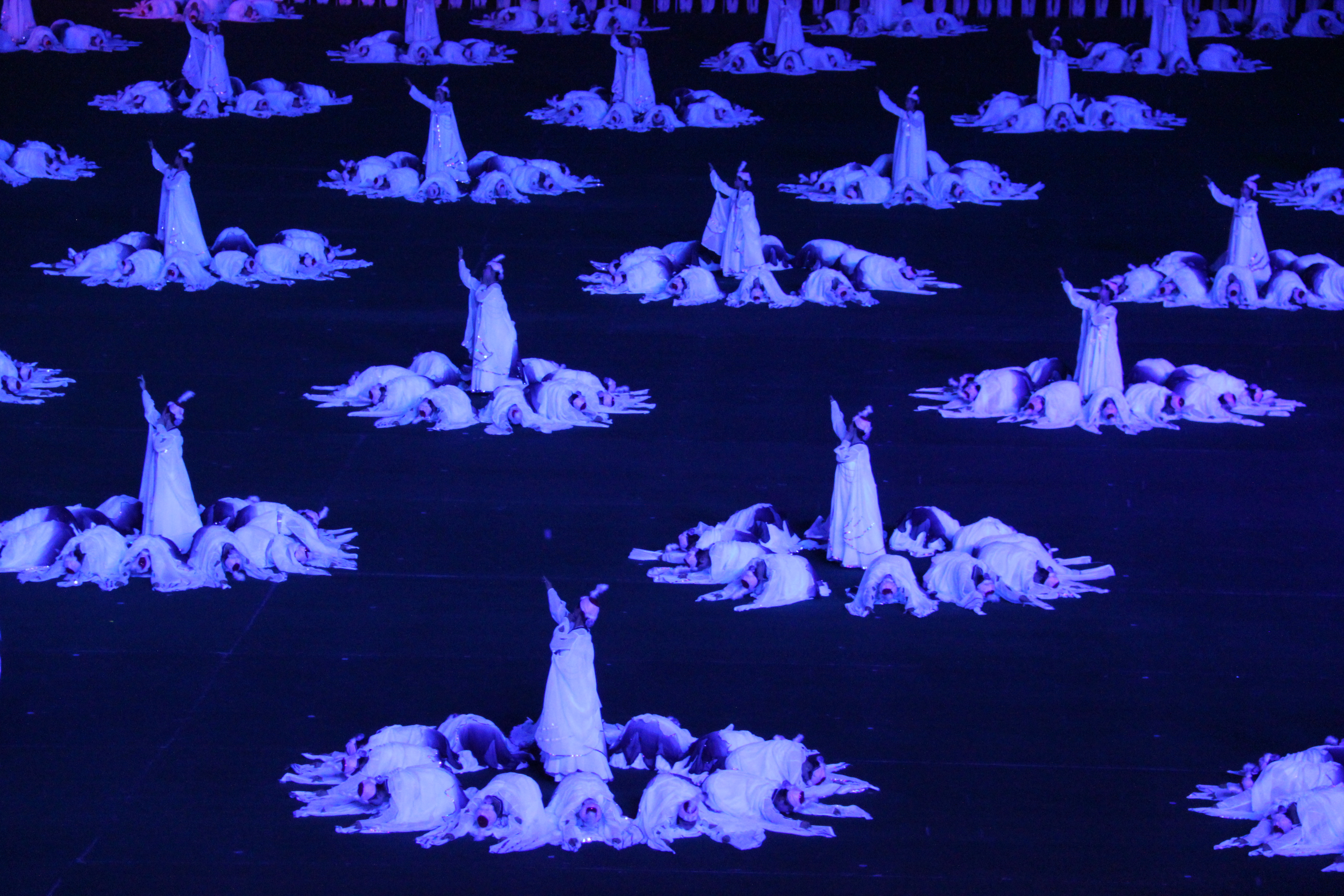
A scene from the 2012 Arirang Festival

The name refers to "Arirang", a Korean folk story about a young couple who are torn apart, here intended to represent the division of Korea.

The festival was held annually between 2002 and 2013, with the exception of 2006. In 2007, Roh Moo-hyun became the first South Korean President to attend the games during the 2007 inter-Korean summit. The mass games were not held in 2014, 2015, 2016, and 2017. In recent years, foreign tourists have been allowed to watch one of the many performances.

The mass games returned after a five-year hiatus, taking place from September 9 through September 30, 2018. The new performance was called "The Glorious Country" (빛나는 조국), honoring the country's 70th founding anniversary on September 9, 1948. On September 19, South Korean President Moon Jae-in attended the Mass Games with Supreme Leader Kim Jong Un and addressed the crowd of 150,000.

The 2019 edition was named "People's Country" or "The Land of The People" (인민의 나라).

A further mass games event was scheduled to begin on August 15, 2020, playing weekly until the October 10. These dates were chosen to coincide with the 75th anniversaries of Liberation Day and Party Foundation Day. The event was eventually held from October 11 through October 31, and was entitled "Great Leadership" (위대한 향도). Due to the COVID-19 pandemic, the country's borders were closed to foreigners at the time.

There were no mass games from 2021 until 2024. After a four-year hiatus in October 2025 the mass games returned, with this edition named "Long Live the Workers Party of Korea" (조선로동당 만세) as part of the festivities of the Workers' Party of Korea's 80th anniversary.

== Iconography ==
The Mass Games possess an important ideological character setting out the legacy and political narratives of the North Korean state, with emphasis placed upon the Workers' Party of Korea, its armed forces, Kim Il Sung and Kim Jong Il.

These messages may not be clear to foreign spectators, who are not aware of North Korean iconography: a rising sun symbolizes Kim Il Sung. When a gun is shown, it signifies the gun which Kim Il Sung gave to his son Kim Jong Il. The colour red, particularly in flowers, stands for the working class, and the colour purple and red flowers represent Kim Il Sung (as the flower Kimilsungia is a purple orchid and the flower Kimjongilia is a red begonia).

== Participants ==
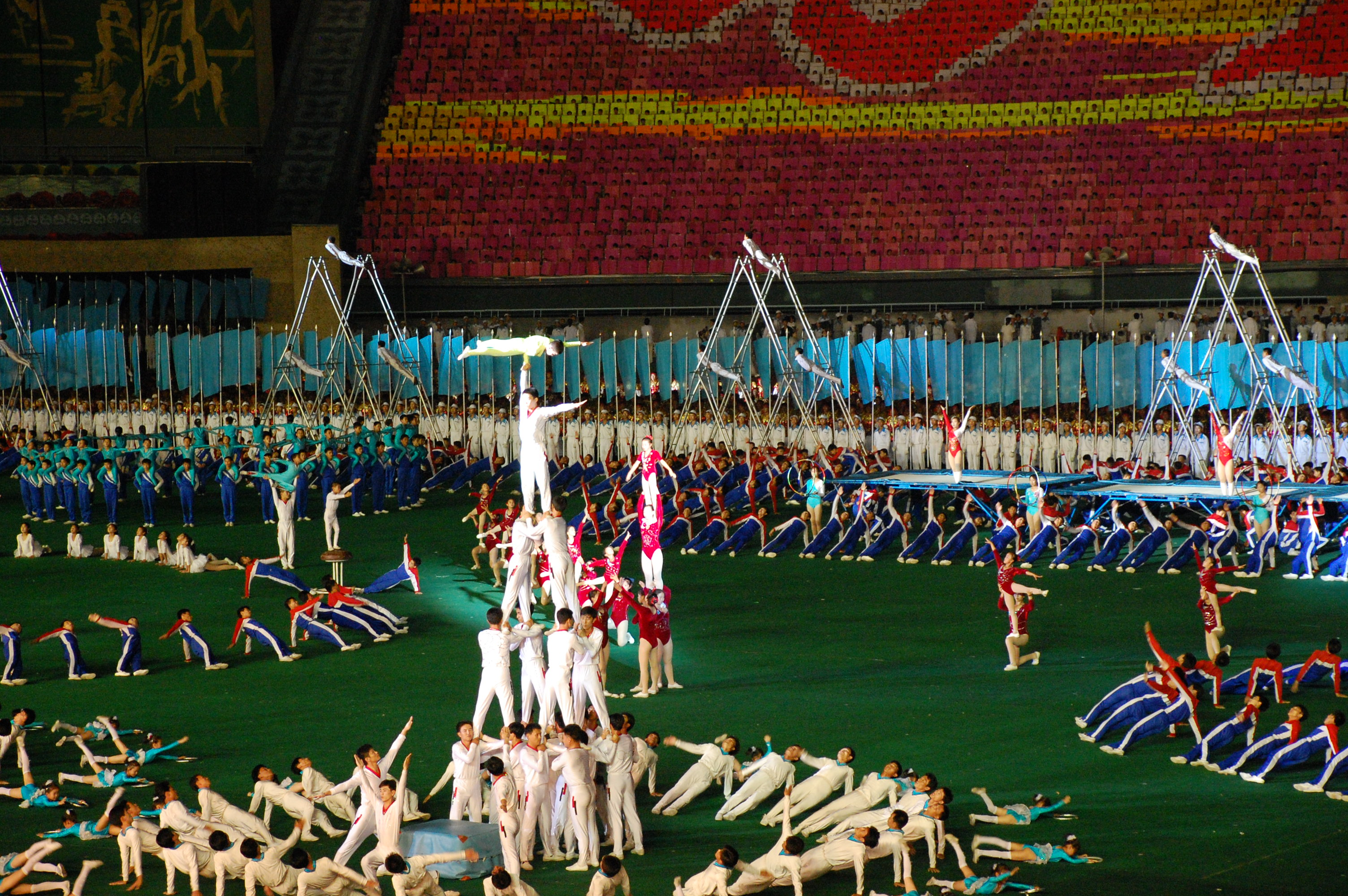
Arirang Festival in 2007

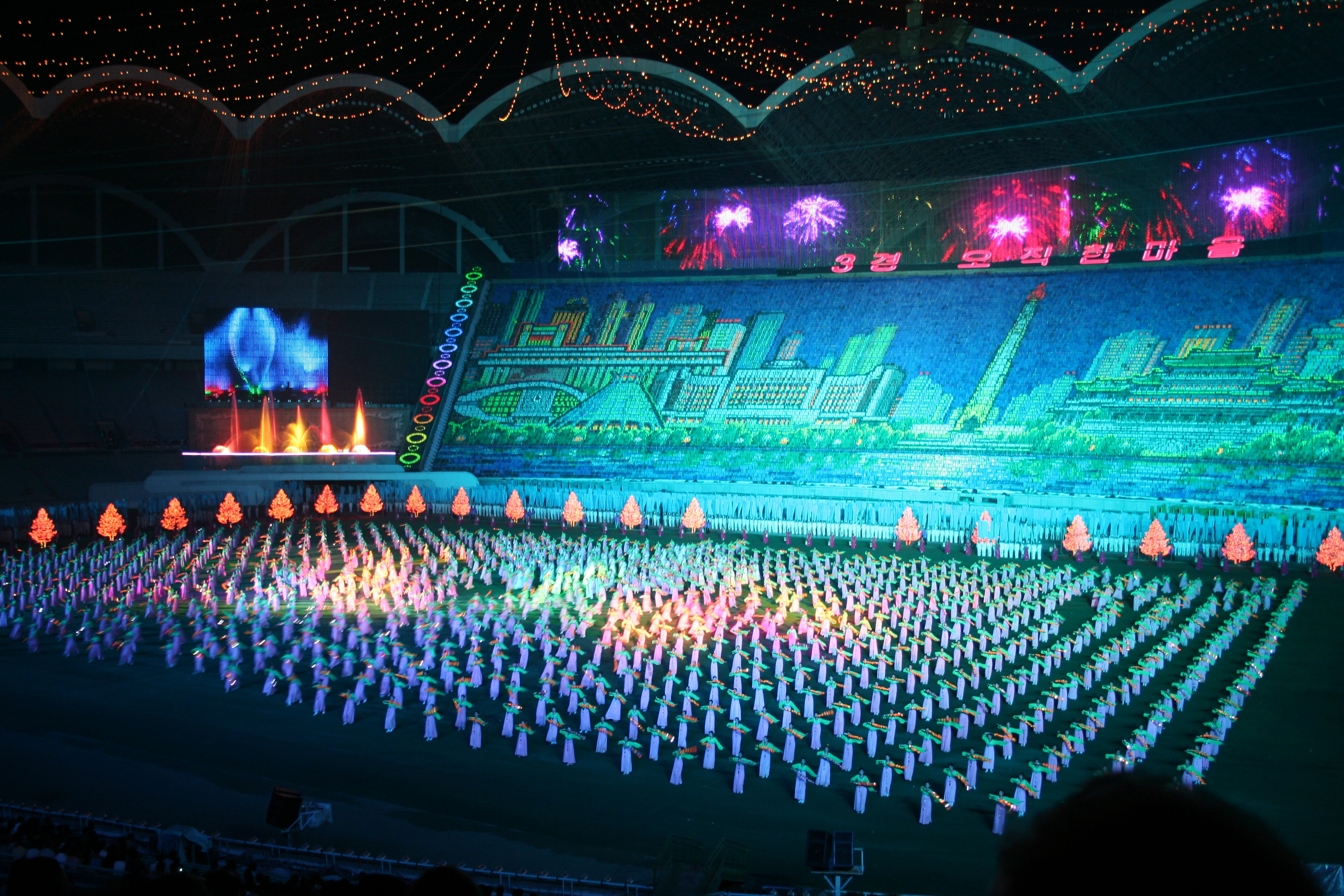
Arirang Festival in 2011

From as young as five years old, North Korean citizens are selected based on skill level to serve for the Arirang Festival for many years. In most cases this will be the way of life for them until retirement.

== Events ==
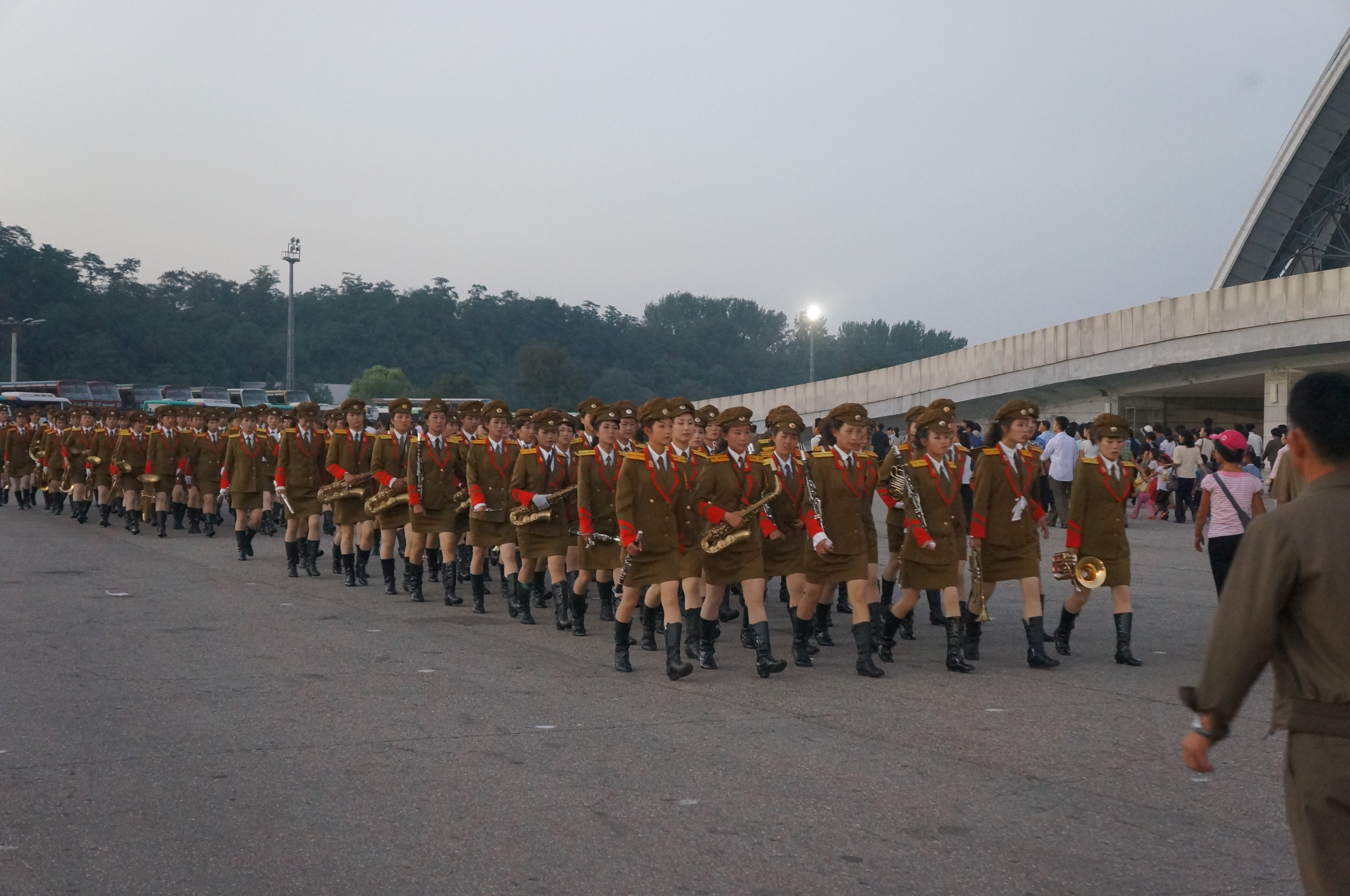
The Korean People's Army Marching Band at the festival in August 2013.

The opening event of the two-month festival are the mass games, which are famed for the huge mosaic pictures created by more than 30,000 trained school children, each holding up coloured cards, in an event known in the West as a card stunt, accompanied by complex and highly choreographed group routines performed by tens of thousands of gymnasts and dancers.

== World record ==
In August 2007, the Arirang Mass Games were recognized by Guinness World Records as the largest gymnastic display with 100,090 participants at the May Day Stadium in Pyongyang.

== See also ==
- Sport in North Korea
- A State of Mind – UK produced documentary (VeryMuchSo productions and Koryo Tours) about child gymnasts in training for the Mass Games
- Juche
- Propaganda in North Korea
- Tourism in North Korea
- Peace Treaty on Korean Peninsula
