= International Friendship Exhibition =

Museum in North Korea

Coordinates: 40.008828°N 126.227975°E

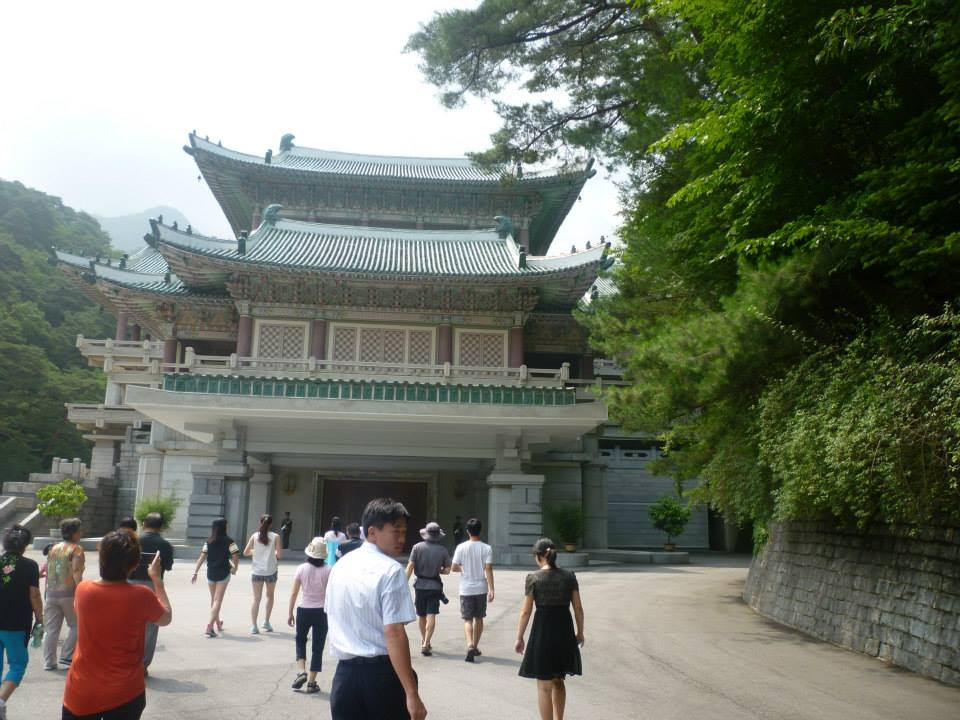

Korean name
- Chosŏn'gŭl: 국제친선전람관
- Hancha: 國際親誼展覽館
- Revised Romanization: Gukje Chinseon Jeollamgwan
- McCune–Reischauer: Kukche Ch'insŏn Chŏllamgwan

The International Friendship Exhibition is a large museum complex located at Myohyangsan, North Pyongan Province, North Korea. It is a collection of halls that house gifts presented to former leaders Kim Il Sung and Kim Jong Il from various foreign dignitaries. The protocol of gift-giving is well established in Korean culture.

== History ==
Built in a traditional style, the halls opened on 26 August 1978 and consist of over 150 rooms covering a total area of between 28,000 and 70,000 square metres. The building offers the impression that it has windows, though it has none. According to a local legend, Kim Jong Il built the International Friendship Exhibition in three days; however, actual construction took a year. Currently, estimates of how many gifts the exhibition holds vary between 60,000 and 220,000 gifts. On entering the exhibition, shoes must be removed and visitors are asked to bow before portraits of Kim Il-sung and Kim Jong-il. Satellite imagery from 2017 shows increased underground activity at the site, suggesting an expansion may be underway.

The setting of the museum in the Myohyang mountains, near the Pohyon temple, was the subject of a poem by Kim Il Sung, which he later chanted from the balcony of the International Friendship Exhibition on October 15, 1979:

"On the balcony I see the most
glorious scene in the world...
The Exhibition stands here,
its green eaves upturned, to exalt
The dignity of the nation,
and Piro Peak looks higher still."

The museum is said to act as propaganda, giving the impression of worldwide support for the North Korean government. Visitors to the museum are informed that the number of gifts constitute "proof of the endless love and respect toward the Great Leader [Kim Il Sung]." However, North Korean visitors to the site are unaware of the ceremonial exchange of gifts in diplomatic protocol, and are described by Helen-Louise Hunter to be "impressed by the self-serving explanations offered to them." Another author, Byoung-lo Philo Kim, states that the entire exhibition is "aimed at convincing [North] Korean visitors that their leaders are universally admired."

== Gifts ==
Most of the gifts received were from friendly communist nations and states. Such gifts include:

- A stuffed bear's head from former Romanian leader Nicolae Ceaușescu.
- A small metal equestrian statue of a horseman and ornate chess-boards from former Libyan leader Muammar Gaddafi.
- A crocodile-skin suitcase from former Cuban leader Fidel Castro.
- A gem-encrusted silver sword and a miniature of a mosque made from mother of pearl, given by former Palestinian leader Yasser Arafat.
- An antique gramophone from China's first premier Zhou Enlai and an armoured train-car from the PRC's first chairman, Mao Zedong (entire wings in the exhibition centre are dedicated to displayed gifts from China).
- An ivory lion statue from Tanzania, a gold cigarette-case from Yugoslavia, a bronze Soviet tank miniature from East Germany and a pair of silver chopsticks from Mongolia.
- A basketball signed by Michael Jordan given by former U.S. Secretary of State Madeleine Albright.
- A ZIS-110 armoured car from former Soviet leader Joseph Stalin.
- An alligator holding out a wooden tray of cocktail glasses with a matching ashtray, from Nicaraguan Sandinistas.
- A copy of the 2007 Bjork album Volta

== See also ==
- Diplomatic gift
- List of international trips made by Kim Il Sung
- List of international trips made by Kim Jong Il
- List of museums in North Korea
