= Sokka Pagoda of the Pohyonsa Buddhist temple =

Buddhist pagoda in North Pyongan, North Korea

Coordinates: 40.0088°N 126.2349°E

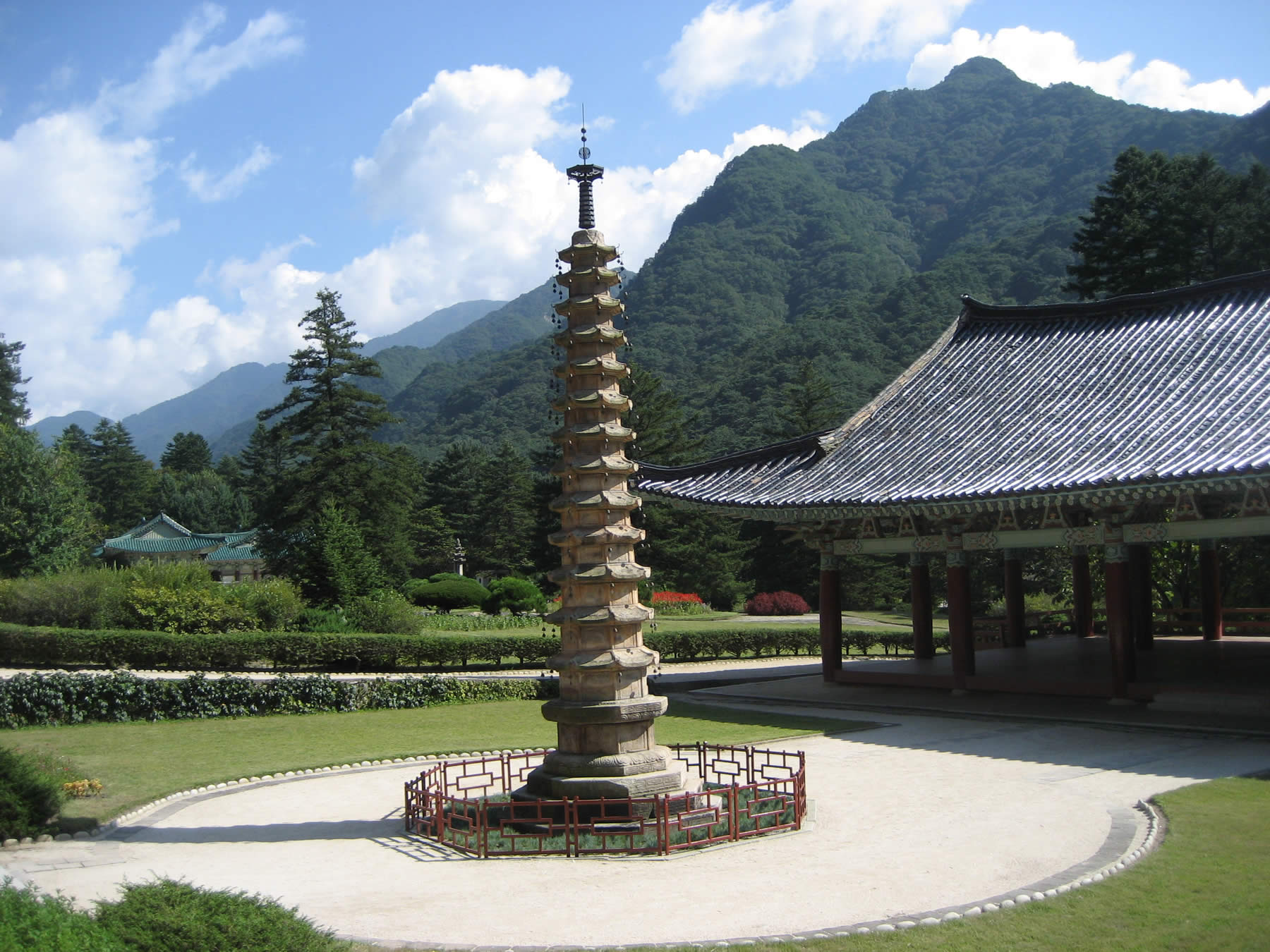

Korean name
- Chosŏn'gŭl: 보현사팔각십삼층탑
- Hancha: 普賢寺八角十三層塔
- Revised Romanization: Bohyeonsa-palgaksipsamcheungtap
- McCune–Reischauer: Pohyŏnsa-p'algaksipsamch'ŭngt'ap

The Sokka Pagoda of the Pohyonsa Buddhist temple is a 13-storeyed octagonal pagoda located at Mount Myohyang, Hyangam-ri, Hyangsan County, North Pyongan Province, North Korea. It is listed as a National Treasure of North Korea.

== Details ==
Built in 1042 CE, the granite structure (also called Sokga Pagoda) was built during the Koryo Dynasty. It is 10.03 m (32.9 ft) high with a 6.58 m (21.6 ft) body. The body of the pagoda tapers off gradually from the bottom upwards. The eaves of the octagonal roof stone and the eaves of each storey are slightly turned-up at the tips giving them a buoyed look; a total 104 bells are hung on each tip of the eaves. A bronze ornament is on top of the pagoda.

The various bells and the gilt bronze ornament were seriously damaged by US bombings during the Korean War. They have since been restored to their original state.

The pagoda is the male counterpart to the feminine Tabo Pagoda of the Pulguska Temple; it inspired the design of the French Embassy in Seoul by Korean architect Kim Chung-up.
