= Tabo Pagoda of Pohyonsa Buddhist temple =

Stone pagoda in North Korea

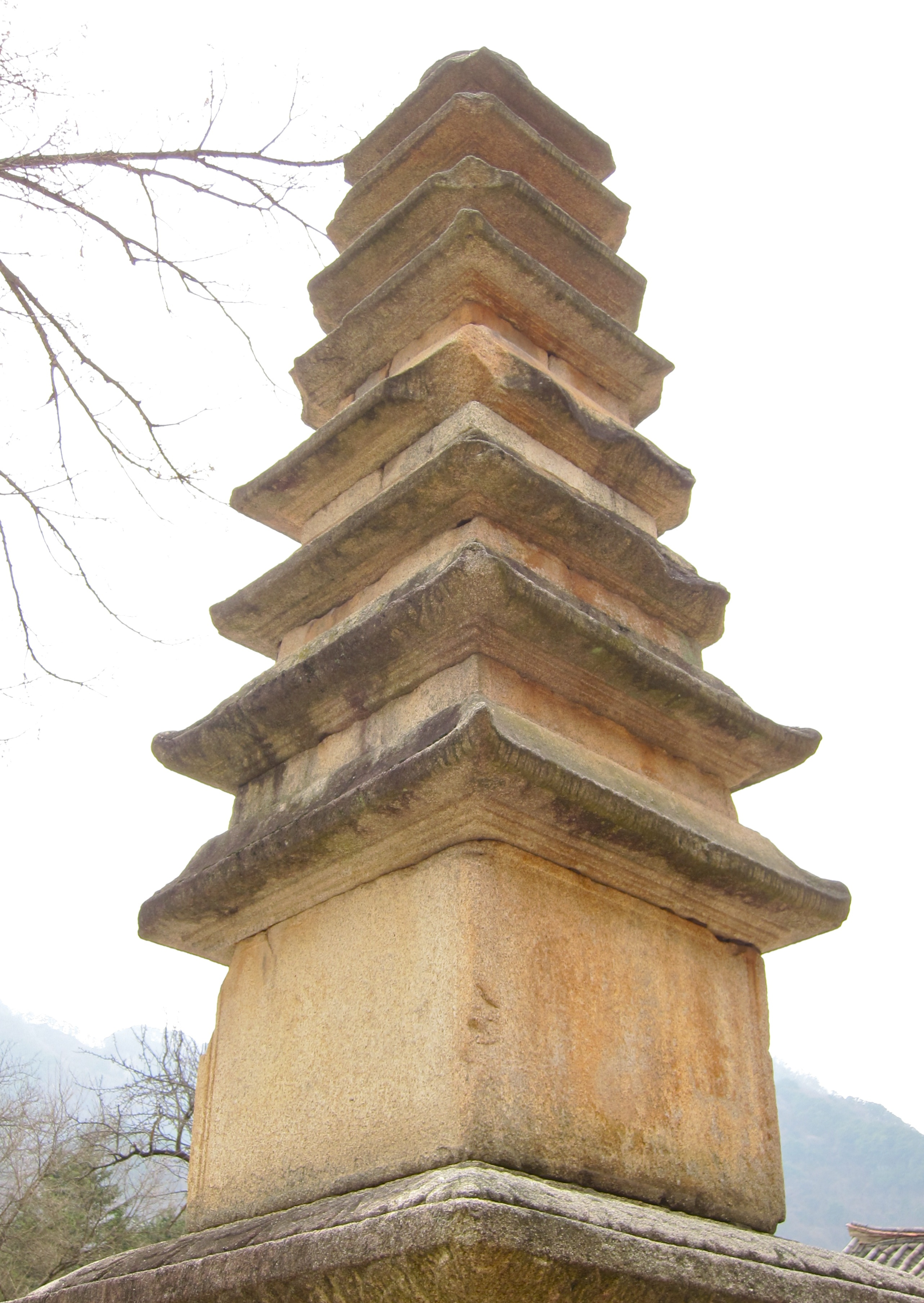

Korean name
- Chosŏn'gŭl: 보현사사각구층탑
- Hancha: 普賢寺四角九層塔
- Revised Romanization: Bohyeonsa-sagakgucheungtap
- McCune–Reischauer: Pohyŏnsa-sagakkuch'ŭngt'ap

Alternative name
- Chosŏn'gŭl: 다보탑
- Hancha: 多寶塔
- Revised Romanization: Dabotap
- McCune–Reischauer: Tabot'ap

The Tabo Pagoda of the Pohyonsa Buddhist temple (Korean: 보현사사각구층탑) is located at Pohyonsa on Mt. Myohyang, Hyangam-ri, Hyangsan County, North Pyongan Province, North Korea. It is a National Treasure in the country. A one-third model of the Pagoda is on display at the Korean Central History Museum in Pyongyang.

== Details ==
Also known as the "Pagoda of many treasures", this structure is a two-storey pagoda. The first storey consists of a platform with four stone staircases leading up to the elevated portion. Here, four pillars create a sheltered area that is thought to once have held a Buddhist statue. The second central stage is made of a simple cornice with rounded, beam-like blocks of granite.

The pagoda is the feminine counterpart to the masculine Sokka Pagoda of the Pulguska Temple; it inspired the design of the French Embassy in Seoul by Korean architect Kim Chung-up.
