= List of international trips made by Kim Jong Il =

The following is a list of international trips made by Kim Jong Il during his tenure as General Secretary of the Workers' Party of Korea and Chairman of the National Defence Commission, capacities which he served in from 1994 to 2011.

== Pre-Supreme Leader trips ==
- One visit to Indonesia
- One visit to China

| Date(s) | Country | Locations | Leaders Met | Details |
|---|---|---|---|---|
| 10-20 April 1965 | Indonesia | Jakarta; Bogor; Bandung | Although he didn't conduct any official meeting on this visit, he did interact with President Sukarno and his daughter Megawati Sukarnoputri | Accompanied his father Kim-Il-Sung on his historic visit to Indonesia to attend the 10th anniversary of the Asian-African Conference |
| 2-12 June 1983 | China | Beijing; Shanghai; Nanjing; Hangzhou | (China) Chairman of the Chinese People's Political Consultative Conference Deng Xiaoping | First visit to China |

== Official trips (Supreme Leader) ==
The number of visits per country where he traveled are:

- Three visits to Russia
- Eight visits to China

| Date(s) | Country | Locations | Leaders met | Details | Image |
|---|---|---|---|---|---|
| 29–31 May 2000 | China | Beijing | (China) General Secretary of the Chinese Communist Party Jiang Zemin | | |
| 15–20 January 2001 | China | Beijing; Shanghai | (China) General Secretary of the Chinese Communist Party Jiang Zemin | | |
| 26 July–18 August 2001 | Russia | Moscow Omsk Saint Petersburg | President of Russia Vladimir Putin | | |
| 20–24 August 2002 | Russia | Khabarovsk; Vladivostok | President of Russia Vladimir Putin | | |
| 19–21 April 2004 | China | Beijing | (China) General Secretary of the Chinese Communist Party Hu Jintao | | |
| 10–18 January 2006 | China | Beijing; Hubei; Guangdong | (China) General Secretary of the Chinese Communist Party Hu Jintao | | |
| 3–5 May 2010 | China | Dalian | (China) General Secretary of the Chinese Communist Party Hu Jintao | | |
| 27 August 2010 | China | Beijing | (China) General Secretary of the Chinese Communist Party Hu Jintao | | |
| 20–26 May 2011 | China | Beijing | (China) General Secretary of the Chinese Communist Party Hu Jintao | | |
| 20–25 August 2011 | Russia | Sosnovy Bor military garrison, Ulan Ude | President of Russia Dmitry Medvedev | | |
| 26 August 2011 | China | Heilongjiang Province | (China) Chinese State Councilor Dai Bingguo | | |

== See also ==
- List of international trips made by Kim Il Sung, his father
- List of international trips made by Kim Jong Un, his son
- North Korean leaders' trains
- International Friendship Exhibition
