= List of international trips made by Kim Jong Un =

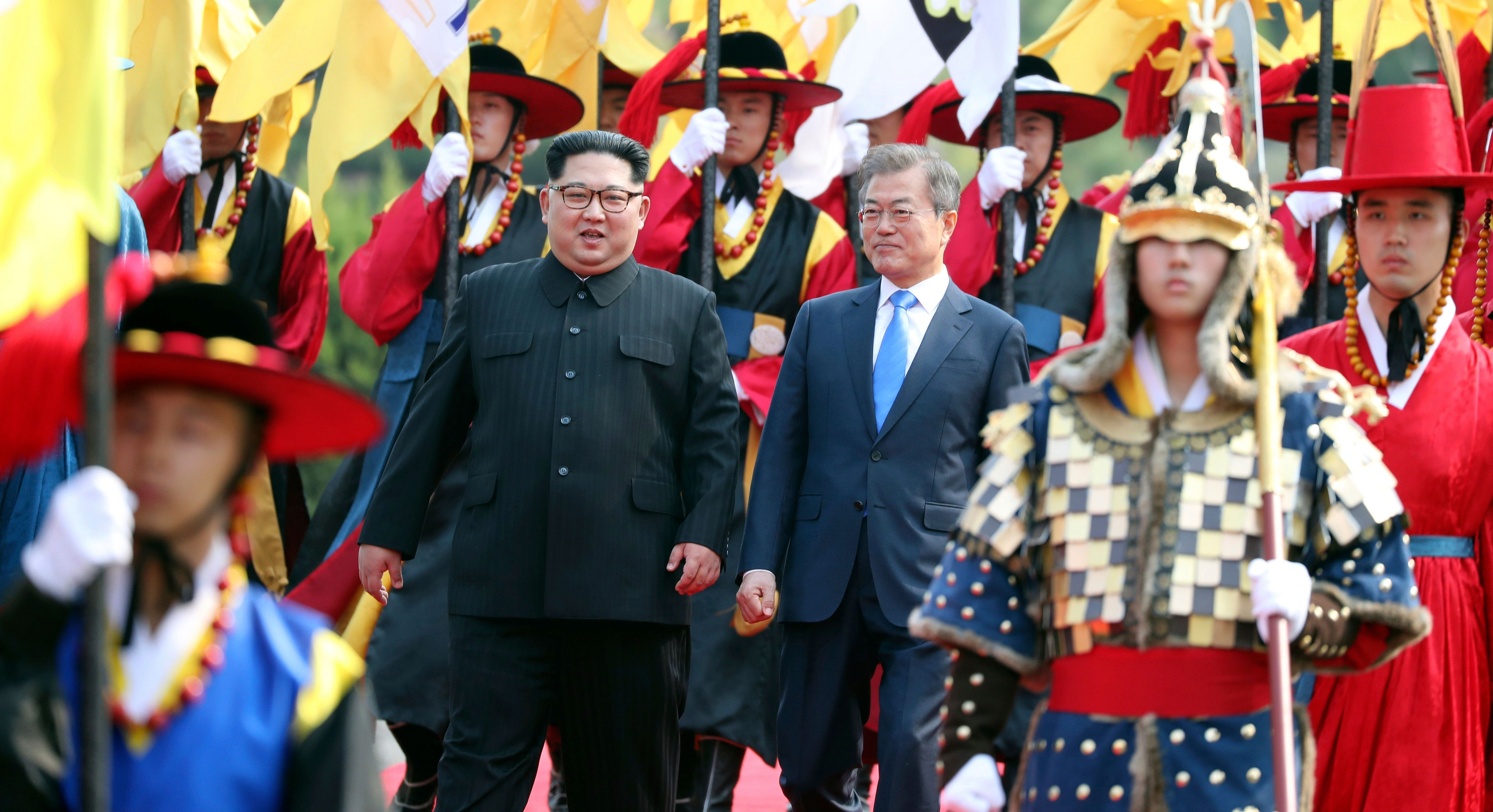
Kim with South Korean president Moon Jae-in being escorted by a South Korean traditional honor guard at the DMZ in April 2018

This is a list of international trips made by Kim Jong Un. During his tenure as North Korean leader, Kim Jong Un has made twelve foreign trips to five countries. Kim became the Commander-in-Chief in 2011 and General Secretary of the Workers' Party of Korea in 2012. His first international state visit was to China in March 2018.

Kim Jong Un was also educated abroad in Switzerland before becoming North Korean leader.

== Summary ==
The number of visits per country where Kim Jong Un traveled are:

- One: Singapore, and Vietnam
- Two: South Korea, and Russia
- Seven: China
  Map of international trips made by Kim Jong Un: One visit Two visits Three visits Four visits Six visits Seven or more visits North Korea

== 2018 ==
	Country	Locations	Date(s)	Leaders met	Details	Image
1	China	Beijing	March 25–28, 2018	(China) General Secretary of the Chinese Communist Party and president Xi Jinping (China) Chinese premier Li Keqiang	Main article: Kim–Xi meetings § First meeting First trip outside of North Korean territory since taking power in 2011. Xi Jinping is the first international leader to meet Kim Jong Un. Classified as an Official state visit. Met with Chinese leader Xi Jinping, Premier Li Keqiang, International Department of the Chinese Communist Party Director Song Tao, Foreign Minister Wang Yi, and members of the CCP Politburo.	
2	South Korea	Peace House, Panmunjom, Demilitarized Zone (DMZ)	April 27, 2018	(South Korea) South Korean President Moon Jae-in	Main article: April 2018 inter-Korean summit Met with President Moon Jae-in in the Joint Security Area of the Korean Demilitarized Zone.	
3	China	Dalian	May 7–8, 2018	(China) General Secretary of the Chinese Communist Party and President Xi Jinping	Main article: Kim–Xi meetings § Second meeting Working visit. Second meeting with Chinese leader Xi Jinping within the span of 40 days.	
4	Singapore	Central Area, Sentosa Island	June 10–12, 2018	(Singapore) Singaporean prime minister Lee Hsien Loong; United States President Donald Trump	Main article: 2018 North Korea–United States Singapore Summit Held a bilateral meeting with Prime Minister Lee Hsien Loong. Met with U.S. president Donald Trump.	
5	China	Beijing	June 19–20, 2018	(China) General Secretary of the Chinese Communist Party and president Xi Jinping	Main article: Kim–Xi meetings § Third meeting Third meeting with China's paramount leader Xi Jinping.	

== 2019 ==
	Country	Locations	Date(s)	Leaders met	Details	Image
6	China	Beijing	January 7–10, 2019	(China) General Secretary of the Chinese Communist Party and President Xi Jinping	Main article: Kim–Xi meetings § Fourth meeting Fourth meeting with China's paramount leader Xi Jinping	
7	China Vietnam	Nanning Lang Son, Hanoi	February 26–March 2, 2019	General Secretary of the Communist Party of Vietnam and President Nguyễn Phú Trọng; Vietnamese prime minister Nguyễn Xuân Phúc; Chairwoman of the National Assembly of Vietnam Nguyễn Thị Kim Ngân; United States President Donald Trump	Main article: 2019 North Korea–United States Hanoi Summit En-route to Vietnam Kim-Jong-Un briefly deboarded his train in China in the city of Nanning where at the train station he was spotted taking a smoke break after that he got back on his train and continued his trip to Vietnam. He did not leave the train station on this visit to China. Met with U.S. president Donald Trump. Official visit. Kim Jong Un stayed in Vietnam after the Trump summit to pay an official goodwill visit to the Socialist Republic of Vietnam. Held a bilateral meeting with Communist Party of Vietnam General Secretary, Vietnamese president Nguyễn Phú Trọng. Met Vietnamese prime minister Nguyễn Xuân Phúc and Chairwoman of the National Assembly of Vietnam Nguyễn Thị Kim Ngân. Chairman Kim also visited President Ho Chi Minh Mausoleum and Vietnam War Memorial, Hanoi. When returning to North Korea from Vietnam he passed again through China though this does not count as a visit to China because unlike the first time during this trip when he deboarded the train he stayed on his train for the whole journey this time so it does not count as a visit but he did pass through China.	
8	Russia	Vladivostok	April 24–26, 2019	(Russia) Russian president Vladimir Putin	Main article: 2019 visit by Kim Jong Un to Russia First meeting with Russian president Vladimir Putin.	
9	South Korea	Freedom House, Panmunjom, Demilitarized Zone (DMZ)	June 30, 2019	United States President Donald Trump (South Korea) South Korean President Moon Jae-in	Main article: 2019 Koreas–United States DMZ Summit Met with US president Donald Trump and South Korean President Moon Jae-in in the Joint Security Area of the Korean Demilitarized Zone.	

== 2023 ==
	Country	Locations	Date(s)	Leaders met	Details	Image
10	Russia	Vostochny Cosmodrome, Eastern Federal University, Komsomolsk aircraft factory, Vladivostok	September 12–17, 2023	(Russia) Russian president Vladimir Putin	Main article: 2023 visit by Kim Jong Un to Russia Second meeting with Russian president Vladimir Putin. Attending the Eastern Economic Forum.	

== 2025 ==
	Country	Locations	Date(s)	Leaders met	Details	Image
11	China	Beijing	September 2–4, 2025	(China) General Secretary of the Chinese Communist Party and President Xi Jinping (Russia) Russian president Vladimir Putin	Main article: Kim–Xi meetings § Sixth meeting Attended the 2025 China Victory Day Parade. Met with President Vladimir Putin and President and Communist Party General Secretary Xi Jinping.	

== 2026 ==
	Country	Locations	Date(s)	Leaders met	Details	Image
12	China	Dandong	October 23, 2026	(China) Chairman of the National Committee of the Chinese People's Political Consultative Conference Wang Huning	Met with CPPCC National Committee Chairman Wang Huning. Kim visited the Memorial of the War to Resist US Aggression and Aid Korea with Wang and Central Foreign Affairs Commission Office director and foreign minister Wang Yi, where he laid a floral tribute. Kim also visited an automobile factory in Dandong. Wang also delivered cordial greetings and best wishes by Xi to Kim. Afterwards, Wang accompanied Kim, as he returned to North Korea through the New Yalu River Bridge.	

== Gallery ==
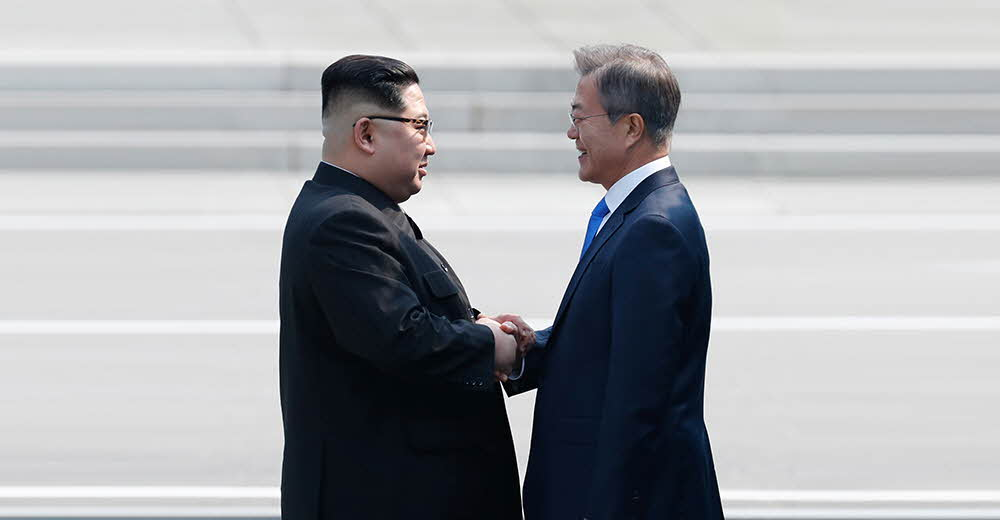
Chairman Kim shakes hands with South Korean President Moon Jae-in at the Joint Security Area of the Korean Demilitarized Zone, April 27, 2018

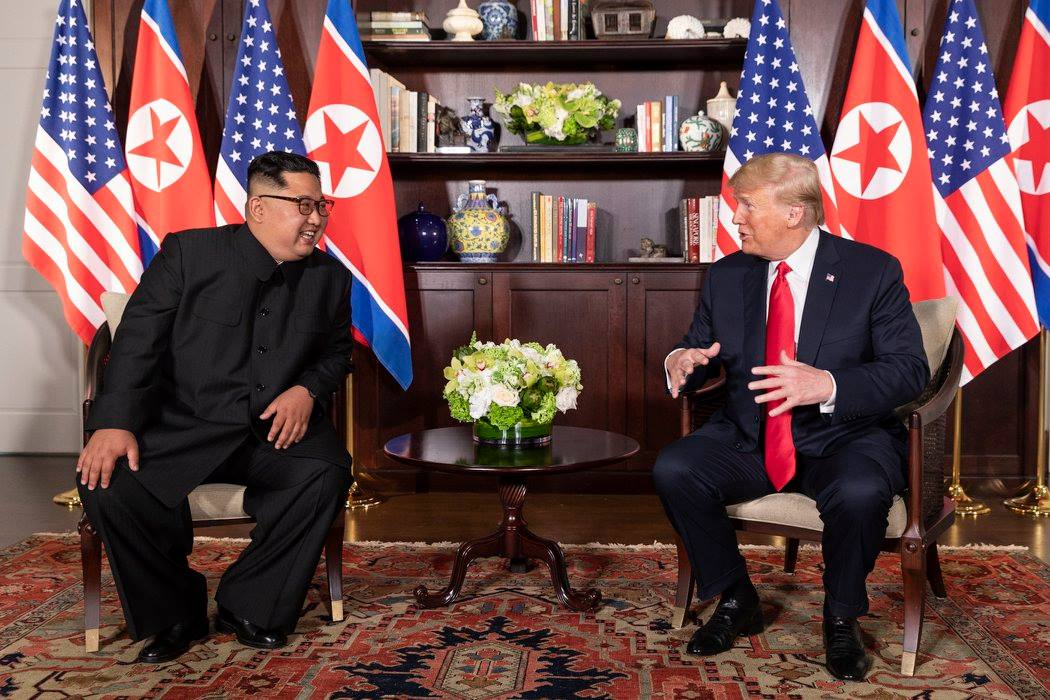
Chairman Kim with U.S. president Donald Trump at the start of the bilateral talks in the Singapore summit, June 12, 2018

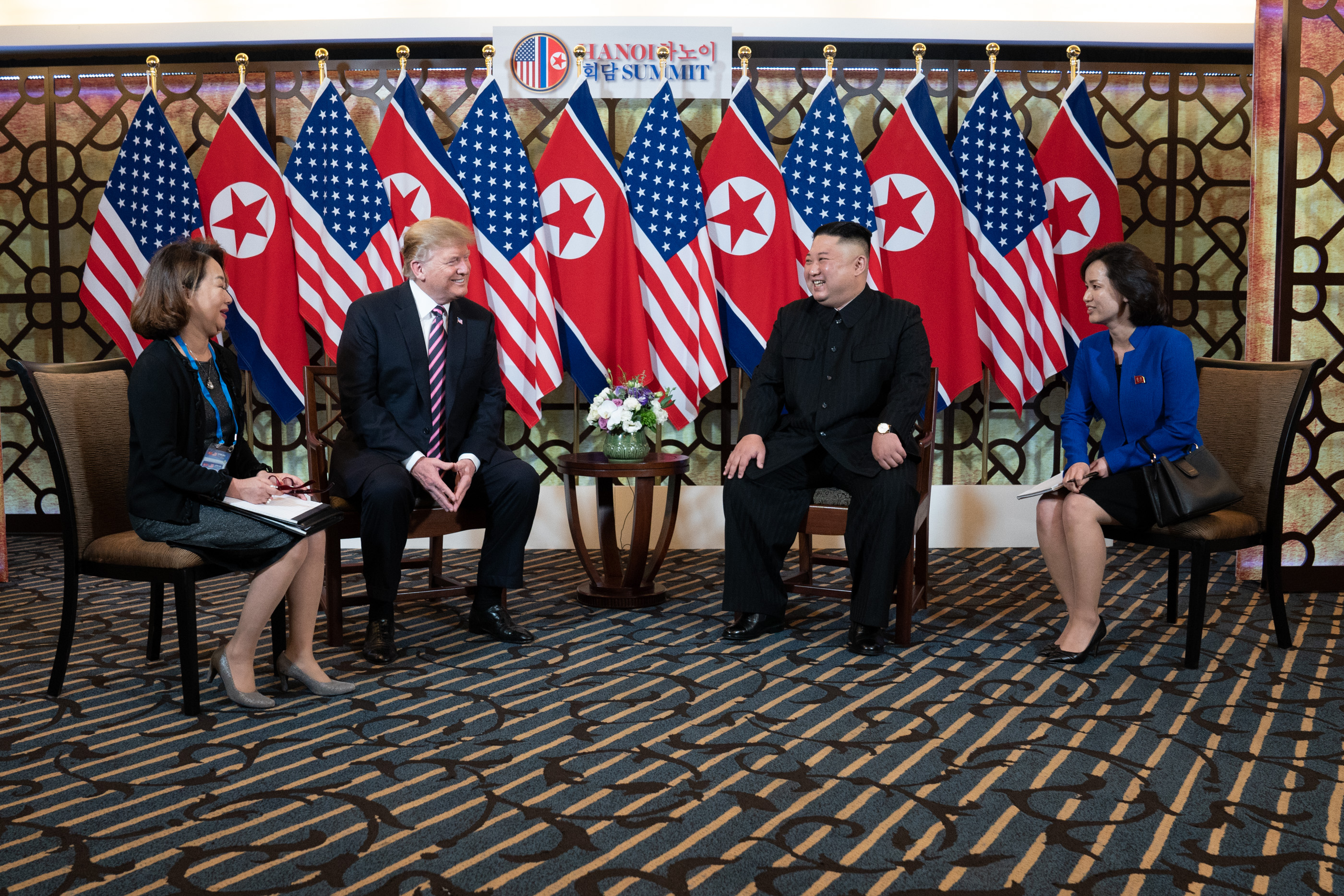
Chairman Kim with U.S. President Donald Trump at the start of the bilateral talks in the Hanoi summit, February 27, 2019

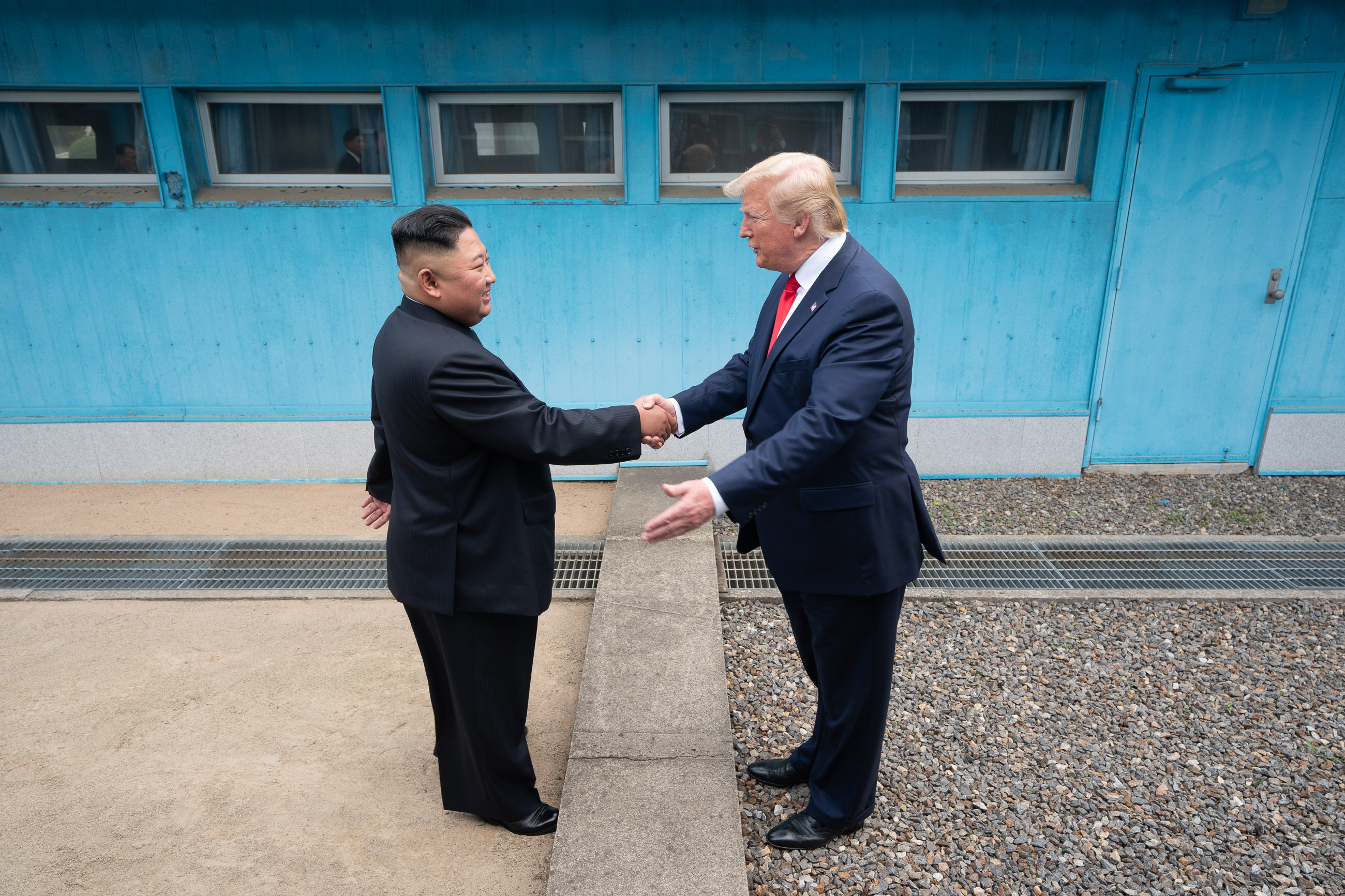
Chairman Kim shakes hands with U.S. president Donald Trump at the Joint Security Area of the Korean Demilitarized Zone, June 30, 2019

== See also ==
- List of international trips made by Kim Il Sung, his grandfather
- List of international trips made by Kim Jong Il, his father
- Taeyangho armoured train
- Ilyushin Il-62 (Russian long-range narrow-body jet airliner)
