= List of international trips made by Kim Il Sung =

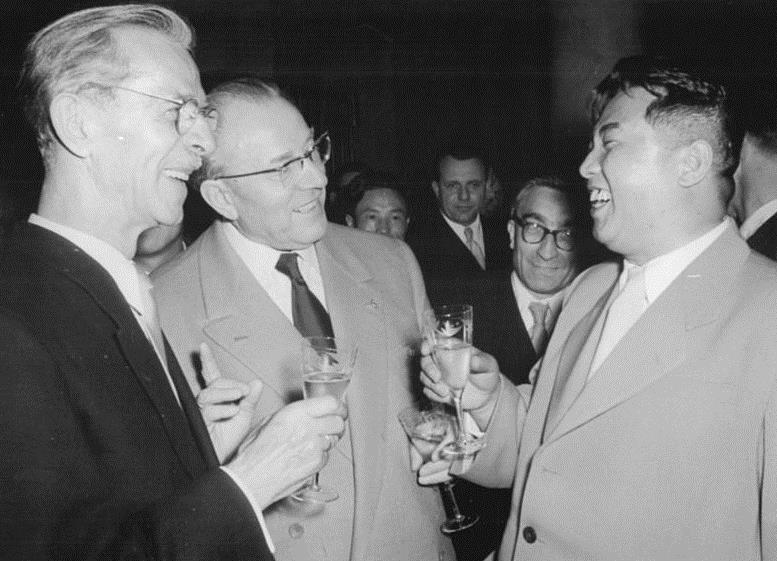
Kim chatting with painter Otto Nagel and Prime Minister Otto Grotewohl during a 1956 visit to East Germany

The following is a list of international trips made by Kim Il Sung during his tenure as General Secretary of the Central Committee of the Workers' Party of Korea, Premier and President of North Korea. His first international state visit was to the Soviet Union in 1949.

The number of visits per country where he traveled are:

- One visit to Albania, Indonesia, Mauritania and Algeria
- Two visits to Czechoslovakia, East Germany, Hungary, Poland, Mongolia, North Vietnam and Yugoslavia
- Three visits to Bulgaria and Romania
- Ten visits to the Soviet Union
- Eleven visits to China

== Summary of official trips ==
=== 1949 ===
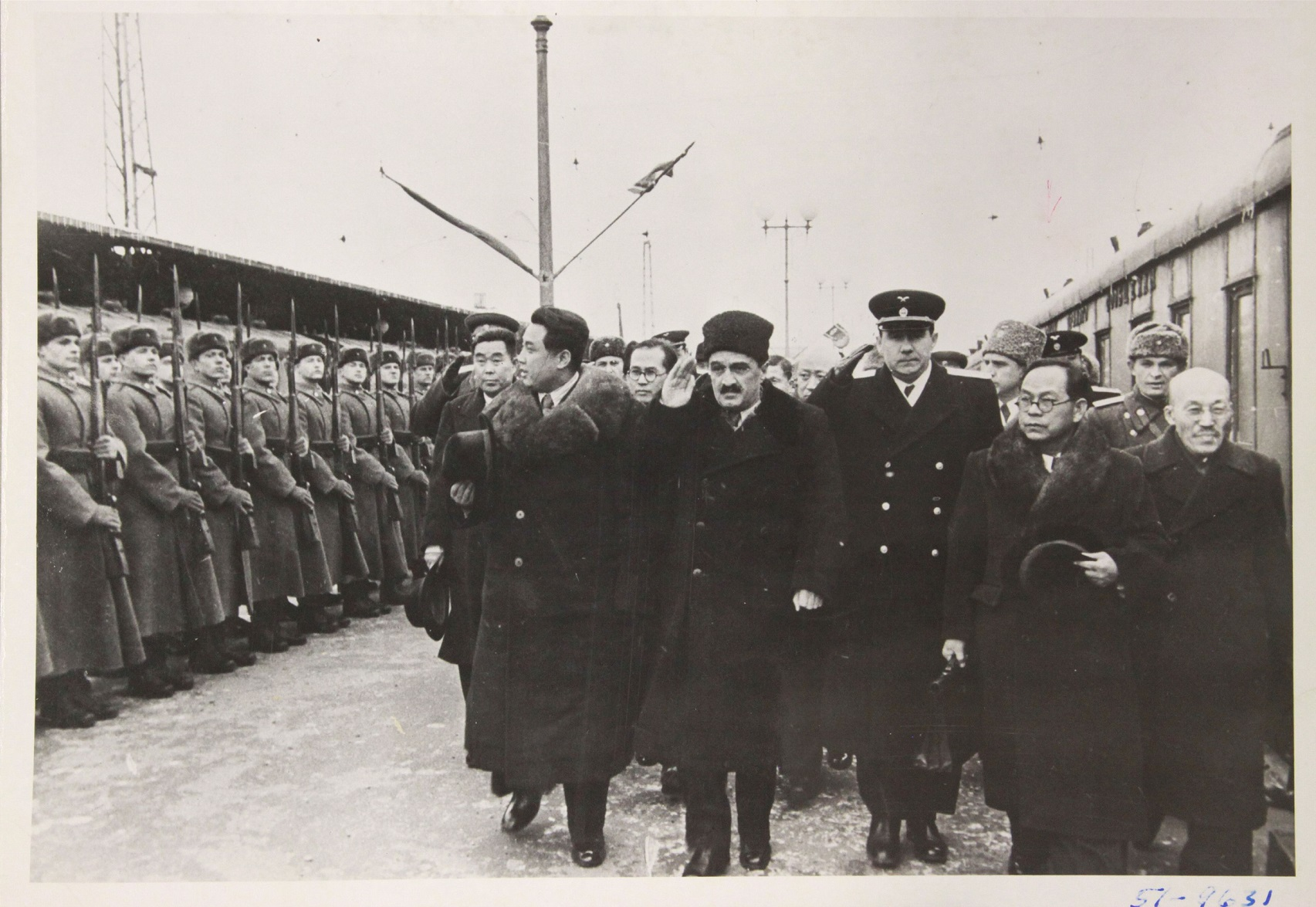
Kim Il Sung, Anastas Mikoyan, Andrei Gromyko, Pak Huen Yung and Hong Myung Hui passing before the guard of honor at the Yaroslav Station in Moscow, March 1949

Date(s)	Country	Locations	Leaders met	Details
3-25 March 1949	Soviet Union	Moscow	General Secretary of the Communist Party of the Soviet Union Joseph Stalin	

=== 1950s ===
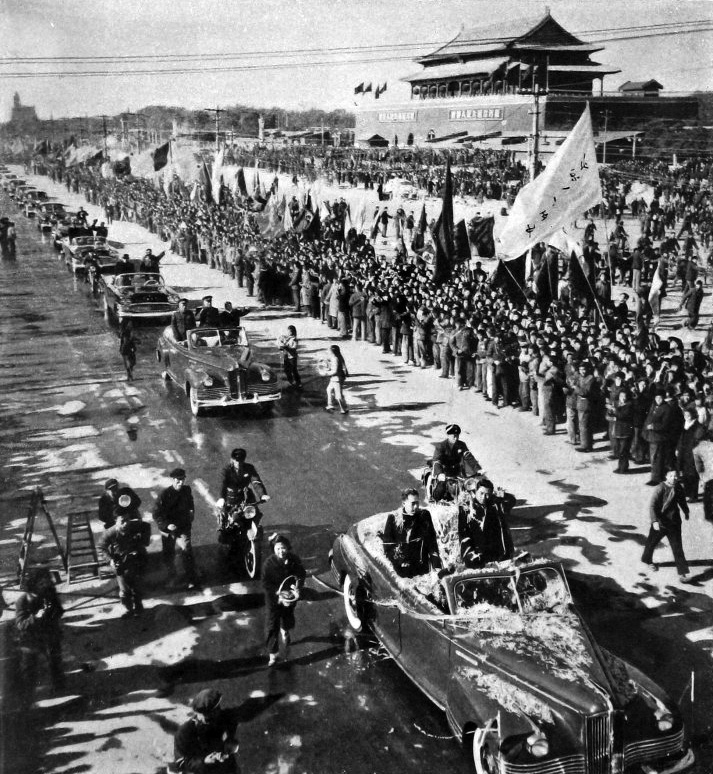
Kim's motorcade in front of the Tiananmen, 22 November 1958

Date(s)	Country	Locations	Leaders met	Details
10-23 September 1953	Soviet Union	Moscow	Premier of the Soviet Union Georgy Malenkov	State visit.
10-27 November 1953	China	Beijing	(China) Chairman of the Chinese Communist Party Mao Zedong	State visit.
28 September-5 October 1954	China	Beijing	(China) Chairman of the Chinese Communist Party Mao Zedong	Attended the Chinese National Day Parade in honor of the 5th anniversary of the PRC.
1-6 June 1956	Soviet Union	Moscow	First Secretary of the Communist Party of the Soviet Union Nikita Khrushchev	
7-12 June 1956	East Germany	East Berlin	President of East Germany Wilhelm Pieck	State visit.
13-17 June 1956	(Socialist Republic of Romania) Romania	Bucharest	(Socialist Republic of Romania) General Secretary of the Romanian Communist Party Gheorghe Gheorghiu-Dej	State visit.
17-20 June 1956	(Hungarian People's Republic) Hungary	Budapest	Chairman of the Council of Ministers of the Hungarian People's Republic Mátyás Rákosi	State visit.
21-25 June 1956	Czechoslovakia	Prague; Plzeň	(Czechoslovak Socialist Republic) First Secretary of the Communist Party of Czechoslovakia and President of Czechoslovakia Antonín Zápotocký	State visit.
25-26 June 1956	(People's Republic of Bulgaria) Bulgaria	Sofia	(People's Republic of Bulgaria) General Secretary of the Central Committee of the Bulgarian Communist Party Todor Zhivkov	state visit
29 June-1 July 1956	(People's Socialist Republic of Albania) Albania	Tirana	(People's Socialist Republic of Albania) First Secretary of the Party of Labour of Albania Enver Hoxha	
2-6 July 1956	Poland	Warsaw	(Poland) First Secretary of the Polish United Workers' Party Edward Ochab	
6-16 July 1956	Soviet Union	Moscow	First Secretary of the Communist Party of the Soviet Union Nikita Khrushchev	
16-18 July 1956	Mongolian People's Republic	Ulaanbaatar	(Mongolian People's Republic) General Secretary of the Mongolian People's Party Yumjaagiin Tsedenbal	State visit.
4-21 November 1957	Soviet Union	Moscow	First Secretary of the Communist Party of the Soviet Union Nikita Khrushchev	Celebrations of the 40th anniversary of the October Revolution as well as the 1957 International Meeting of Communist and Workers Parties.
21-28 November 1958	China	Beijing	(China) Chairman of the Chinese Communist Party Mao Zedong	
28 November-2 December 1958	North Vietnam	Hanoi	(North Vietnam) Chairman of the Central Committee of the Workers' Party of Vietnam Ho Chi Minh	
14 January-6 February 1959	Soviet Union	Moscow	First Secretary of the Communist Party of the Soviet Union Nikita Khrushchev	
1 October 1959	China	Beijing	(China) Chairman of the Chinese Communist Party Mao Zedong	Attended the Chinese National Day Parade in honor of the 10th anniversary of the PRC.

=== 1960s ===
Date(s)	Country	Locations	Leaders met	Details
3-25 March 1961	Soviet Union	Moscow	First Secretary of the Communist Party of the Soviet Union Nikita Khrushchev	
17-31 October 1961	Soviet Union	Moscow	First Secretary of the Communist Party of the Soviet Union Nikita Khrushchev	22nd Congress of the Communist Party of the Soviet Union
11-15 July 1961	China	Beijing	(China) Chairman of the Chinese Communist Party Mao Zedong	Signing of Sino-North Korean Mutual Aid and Cooperation Friendship Treaty
November 1964	North Vietnam	Hanoi	(North Vietnam) Chairman of the Central Committee of the Workers' Party of Vietnam Ho Chi Minh	
10-20 April 1965	Indonesia	Bandung	President of Indonesia Sukarno	Kim delivered a landmark speech "On Socialist Construction in the Democratic People's Republic of Korea and the South Korean Revolution".
3-7 July 1966	(Socialist Republic of Romania) Romania	Bucharest	(Socialist Republic of Romania) General Secretary of the Romanian Communist Party Nicolae Ceaușescu	Comecon Summit

According to some reports, two secret meetings were rumored to have been held between Kim and Soviet leader Leonid Brezhnev in 1966 and 1968 in the USSR, with the first theorized to have taken place on the Soviet cruiser Varyag.

=== 1970s ===
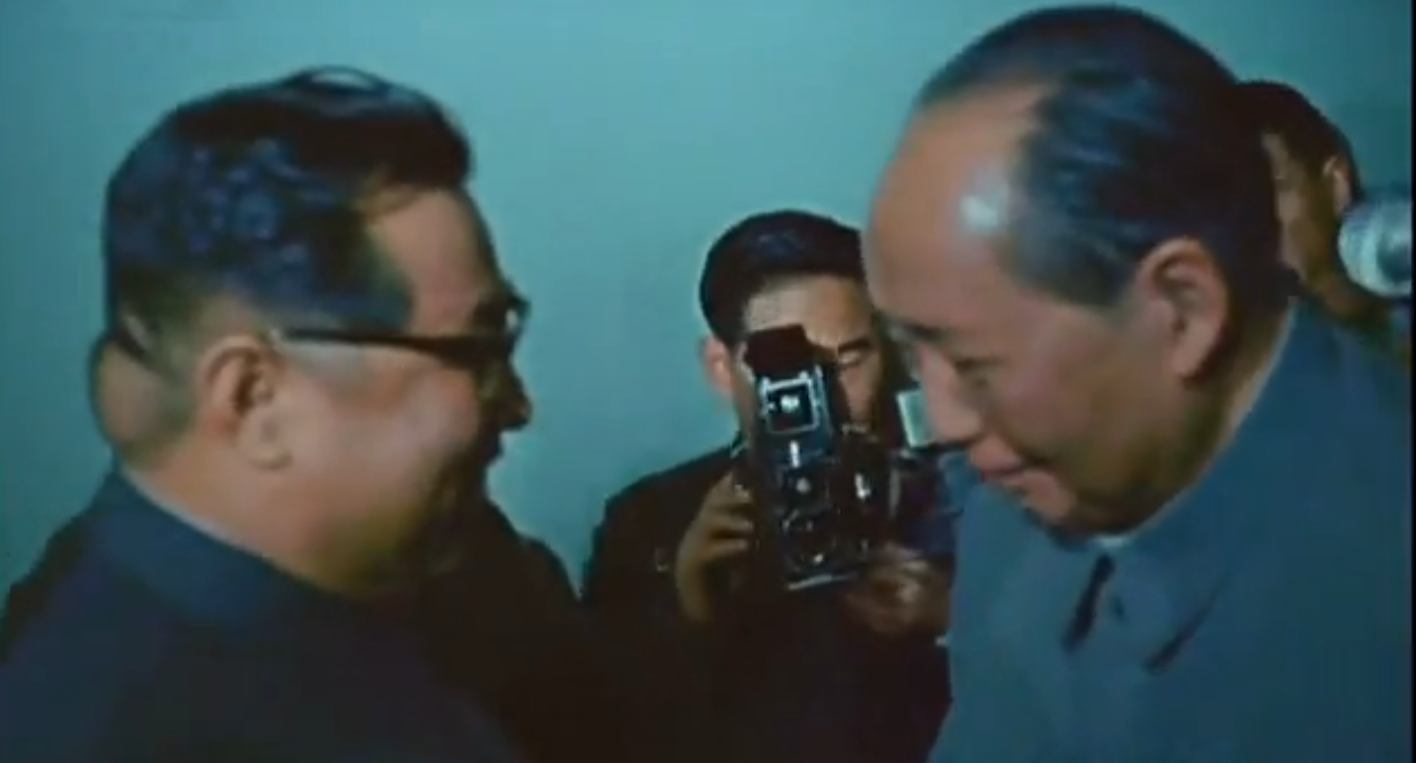
Kim Il Sung during a diplomatic meeting between him and Chinese Communist Party chairman Mao Zedong in Beijing, 1970

Date(s)	Country	Locations	Leaders met	Details
October 1970	China	Beijing	(China) Chairman of the Chinese Communist Party Mao Zedong	
18-26 April 1975	China	Beijing	(China) Chairman of the Chinese Communist Party Mao Zedong	
22-26 May 1975	(Socialist Republic of Romania) Romania	Bucharest	(Socialist Republic of Romania) President of Romania Nicolae Ceaușescu	State visit.
26-30 May 1975	Algeria	Algiers	(Algeria) Chairman of Revolutionary Council Houari Boumédiène	State visit.
30 May-4 June 1975	Mauritania	Nouakchott	President of Mauritania Moktar Ould Daddah	He claimed that the visit was "The greatest event in the history of Mauritania".
4-6 June 1975	(People's Republic of Bulgaria) Bulgaria	Sofia	(People's Republic of Bulgaria) General Secretary of the Central Committee of the Bulgarian Communist Party Todor Zhivkov	State visit.
5-10 June 1975	Yugoslavia	Brdo pri Kranju, Bled, Lake Bohinj, Ljubljana	(Socialist Federal Republic of Yugoslavia) President of Yugoslavia Josip Broz Tito	

=== 1980s ===
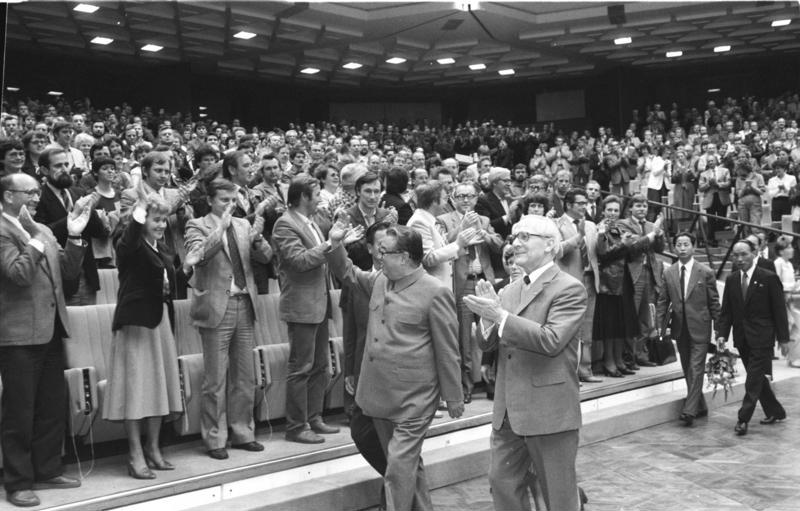
Kim with Erich Honecker in East Berlin, 1 June 1984

Date(s)	Country	Locations	Leaders met	Details
7-9 May 1980	Yugoslavia	Belgrade	(Socialist Federal Republic of Yugoslavia) President of the Presidency of Yugoslavia Lazar Koliševski	Death and state funeral of Josip Broz Tito
9-13 May 1980	(Socialist Republic of Romania) Romania	Bucharest	(Socialist Republic of Romania) President of Romania Nicolae Ceaușescu	State visit.
15-26 September 1982	China	Beijing; Chengdu	(China) Chairman of the Chinese People's Political Consultative Conference Deng Xiaoping	
2-12 June 1983	China	Beijing	(China) General Secretary of the Chinese Communist Party Hu Yaobang	
17-27 May 1984	Soviet Union	Moscow; Minsk	General Secretary of the Communist Party of the Soviet Union Konstantin Chernenko	State visit.
27-29 May 1984	Poland	Warsaw	(Poland) First Secretary of the Polish United Workers' Party and Chairman of the Council of State Wojciech Jaruzelski	State visit
29 May-4 June 1984	East Germany	East Berlin	(East Germany) General Secretary of the Socialist Unity Party of Germany Erich Honecker	State visit.
4-7 June 1984	Czechoslovakia	Prague	(Czechoslovak Socialist Republic) First Secretary of the Communist Party of Czechoslovakia and President of Czechoslovakia Gustáv Husák	State visit.
7-9 June 1984	(Hungarian People's Republic) Hungary	Budapest	(Hungarian People's Republic) General Secretary of the Hungarian Socialist Workers' Party János Kádár	State visit
9-12 June 1984	Yugoslavia	Belgrade	(Socialist Federal Republic of Yugoslavia) President of the Presidency of Yugoslavia Veselin Djuranovic	State visit.
12-18 June 1984	(People's Republic of Bulgaria) Bulgaria	Sofia	(People's Republic of Bulgaria) General Secretary of the Central Committee of the Bulgarian Communist Party Todor Zhivkov	State visit.
18-21 June 1984	(Socialist Republic of Romania) Romania	Bucharest	(Socialist Republic of Romania) President of Romania Nicolae Ceaușescu	State visit.
22-27 October 1986	Soviet Union	Moscow	General Secretary of the Communist Party of the Soviet Union Mikhail Gorbachev	
20-23 May 1987	China	Beijing	(China) General Secretary of the Chinese Communist Party Zhao Ziyang	
25 June-1 July 1988	Mongolian People's Republic	Ulaanbaatar	(Mongolian People's Republic) General Secretary of the Mongolian People's Party Jambyn Batmönkh	State visit.

=== 1990s ===
Date(s)	Country	Locations	Leaders met	Details
3-15 October 1991	China	Beijing	President of China Yang Shangkun	

== See also ==
- List of international trips made by Kim Jong Il, his son
- List of international trips made by Kim Jong Un, his grandson
- North Korean leaders' trains
- Ilyushin Il-62 – Soviet long-range narrow-body four-engined jet airliner
- Awards and decorations received by Kim Il Sung
  - International Friendship Exhibition
