= Pohyonsa =

Buddhist temple in Hyangsan, North Korea

Coordinates: 40°0′30″N 126°14′6″E

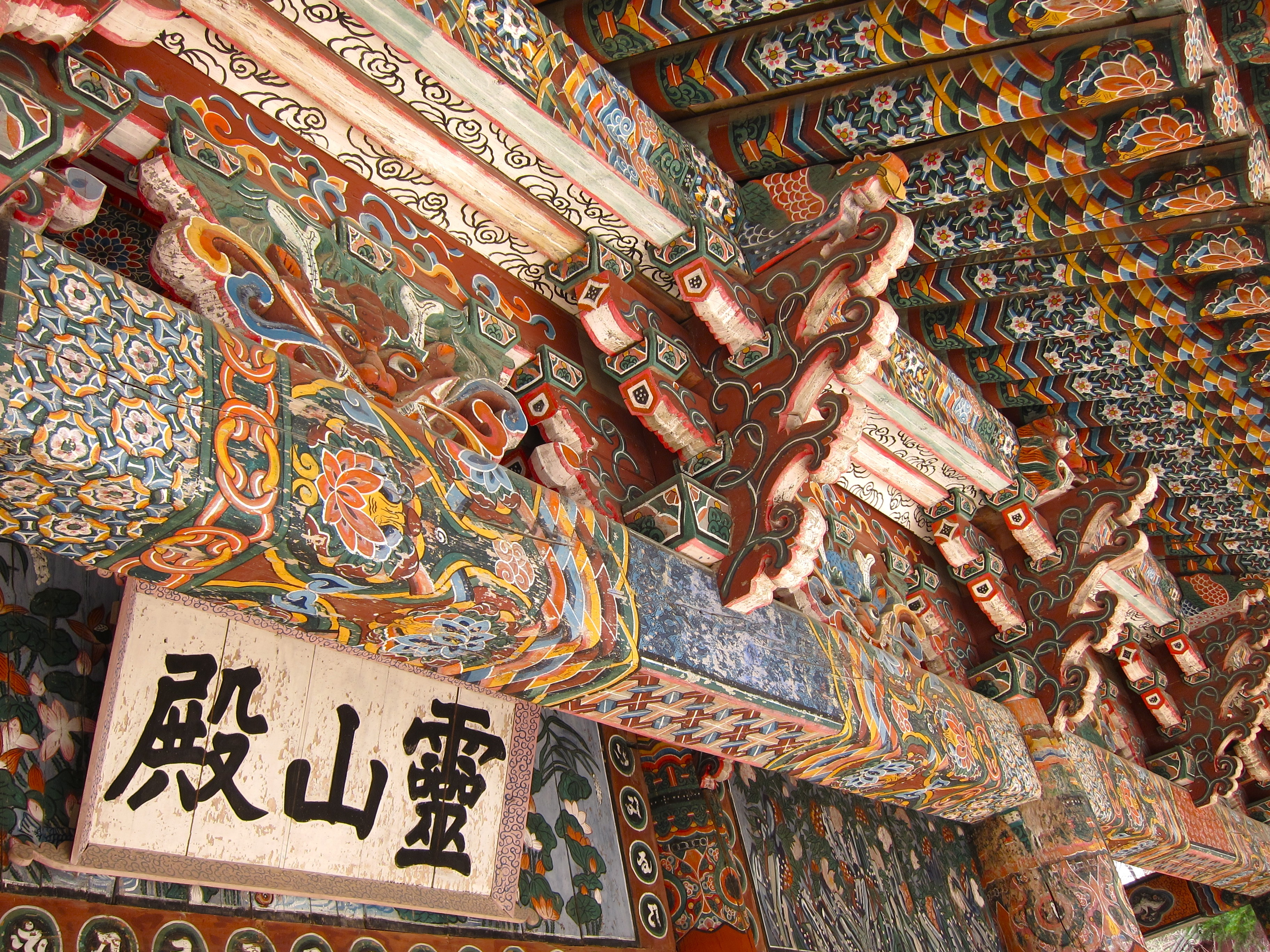

Korean name
- Hangul: 보현사
- Hanja: 普賢寺
- RR: Bohyeonsa
- MR: Pohyŏnsa

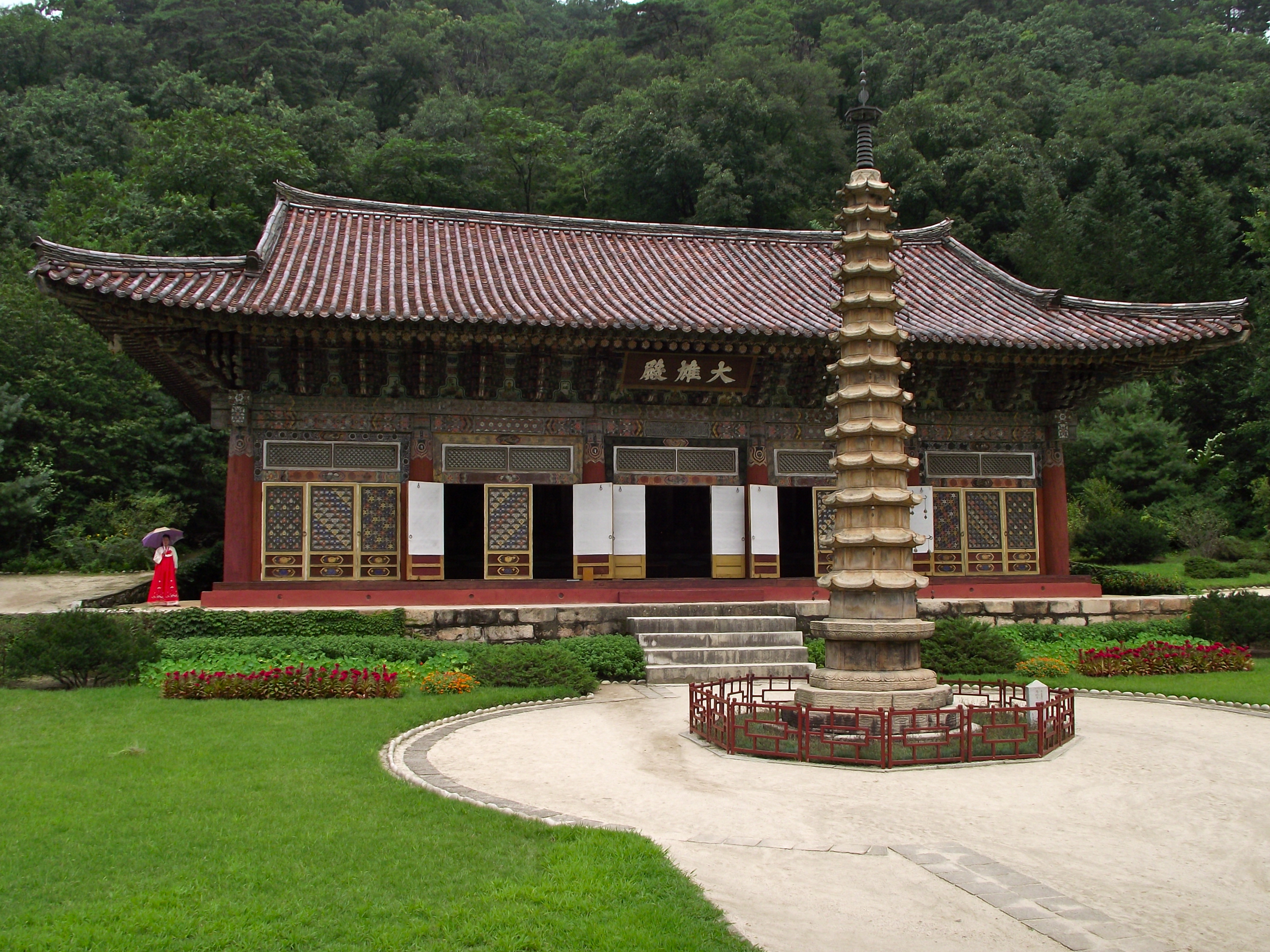
Pohyon Temple, Mount Myohyang

Pohyon-sa is a Korean Buddhist temple located in Hyangsan county in North Pyong'an Province, North Korea. It is located within the Myohyang Mountains. Founded under the Koryo dynasty at the start of the 11th century, the temple flourished as one of the greatest centers of Buddhism in the north of Korea, and became a renowned place of pilgrimage. Like most other temples in North Korea, the complex suffered extensive damage from US bombing during the Korean War. The temple is designated as National Treasure #40 in North Korea, with many of its component buildings and structures further declared as individual national treasures.

== History ==
Pohyon Temple was founded under the Koryo dynasty in 1024 and named after the Buddhist deity Samantabhadra (known as Pohyon Posal in Korean).

During the Imjin Wars, when Japanese warlord Toyotomi Hideyoshi ordered several attempted invasions of Korea, the temple became a stronghold for bands of warrior monks led by the great saint Sosan. At age 73, he led bands against the Japanese armies, even assisting recapture Pyongyang from the Japanese. He died at the temple in 1604. During the war, the temple was charged with protection the Chonju copy of the four Annals of the Yi Dynasty, which was secured in the nearby Puryong Hermitage. This copy was the only one to survive the war.

In 1951, at the start of the Korean War, the complex was bombed by US forces, who destroyed over half of its 24 pre-war buildings, including the main prayer hall. Several have since been reconstructed.

== Composition ==
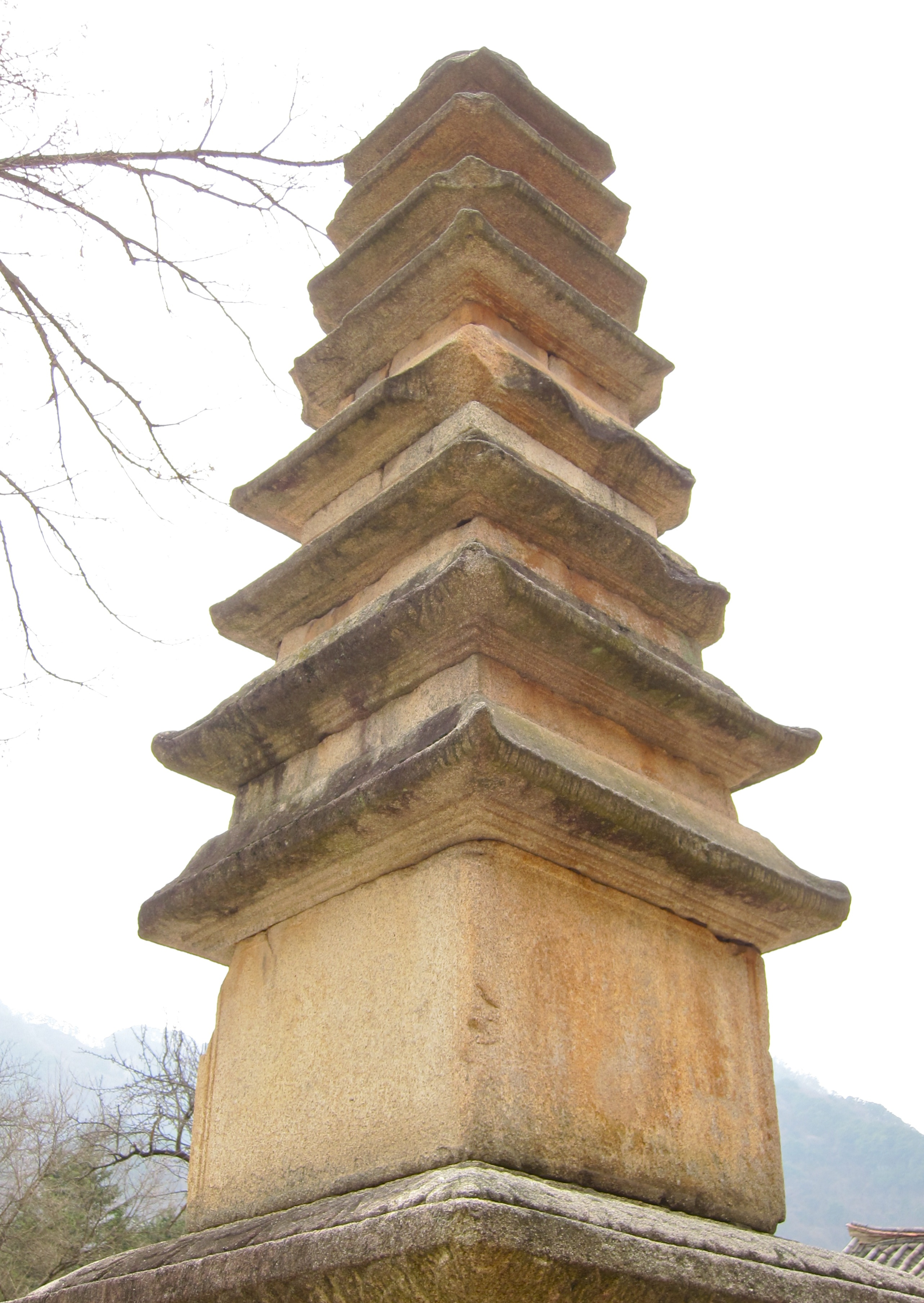
The nine-story Tabo Pagoda

Pohyon temple features extensive grounds. While most of the important buildings are located along an axis centered on Taeung Hall, much of the center of the temple is taken up by a large lawn surrounded by various other halls and shrines.

Pohyon Temple was once entered through a series of three ceremonial gates, though visitors now enter through a gate at the temple's side. The outer gate, Jogye Gate (曹溪門), was built in 1644 and houses two Deva statues; it is now closed to through traffic. Between this gate and Haetal Gate (解脫門, "Gate of Nirvana"), the temple's middle gate, is a long, tree-lined path lined with commemorative stele detailing the temple's history. Some of these still bear shrapnel scars from the Korean War. The inner gate of Pohyon Temple is Chonwang Gate 天王門, Gate of the Four Heavenly Kings), which contains statues of the Buddhist deities of the same name.

Directly through Chonwang Gate is Manse Pavilion (萬歲樓, "Pavilion of Ten Thousand Years"), a former meditation hall. Destroyed by American bombing in 1951, Manse Pavilion was reconstructed in 1979 but using concrete rather than its original wood. In front of the pavilion is the nine-storey Tabo Pagoda (多寶塔, "Pagoda of Many Treasures"), erected in 1044 and designated National Treasure #7.

The main hall of the temple, Taeung Hall (大雄殿) was also destroyed during the Korean War by U.S. bombing; reconstructed in 1976, it stands as faithful replica of the 1765 original. In the courtyard between it and Manse Pavilion stands the 13-storey Sokka Pagoda (釋迦塔), erected in the 14th century and designated National Treasure #144.

To the right of Taeung Hall, and past a small garden, sits Kwanum Hall (觀音殿). Named after the bodhisattva Avalokitesvara (known as Guanyin in Chinese), Kwanum Hall was built in 1449 and is the oldest building in the temple compound. It is designated as National Treasure #57. To the east of this hall is Ryongsan Hall (靈山殿)

In the northeast corner of the temple is the walled Suchung Shrine (酬忠祠, "Shrine of Rewarding Loyalty"). Constructed in 1794, this small walled compound honors the priests who led bands of warrior monks to repel the Japanese invasions of 1592–1598. Inside, memorial services were once held for the great monk Sŏsan, who once resided in this temple and was instrumental in driving out the invasion forces of Toyotomi Hideyoshi. Inside the compound is a portrait hall, which contains paintings and relics related to three patriotic monks, and a Monument Pavilion, which houses a stele erected in 1796 to records Sŏsan's patriotic deeds. The compound is designated as National Treasure #143.

South of the shrine, on the east side of the lawn, is the temple archive, also known as Changgyong Pavilion (藏經樓). This is a modern structure, as the original library burned down during the US bombings of 1951. It houses a copy of the Tripitaka Koreana, a UNESCO-designated cultural relic; the original wooden printing blocks are located at Haeinsa.

== See also ==
- Korean Buddhism
- Korean Buddhist sculpture
- National Treasures of North Korea
