= Mount Myohyang =

Mountain in North Korea

Myohyang
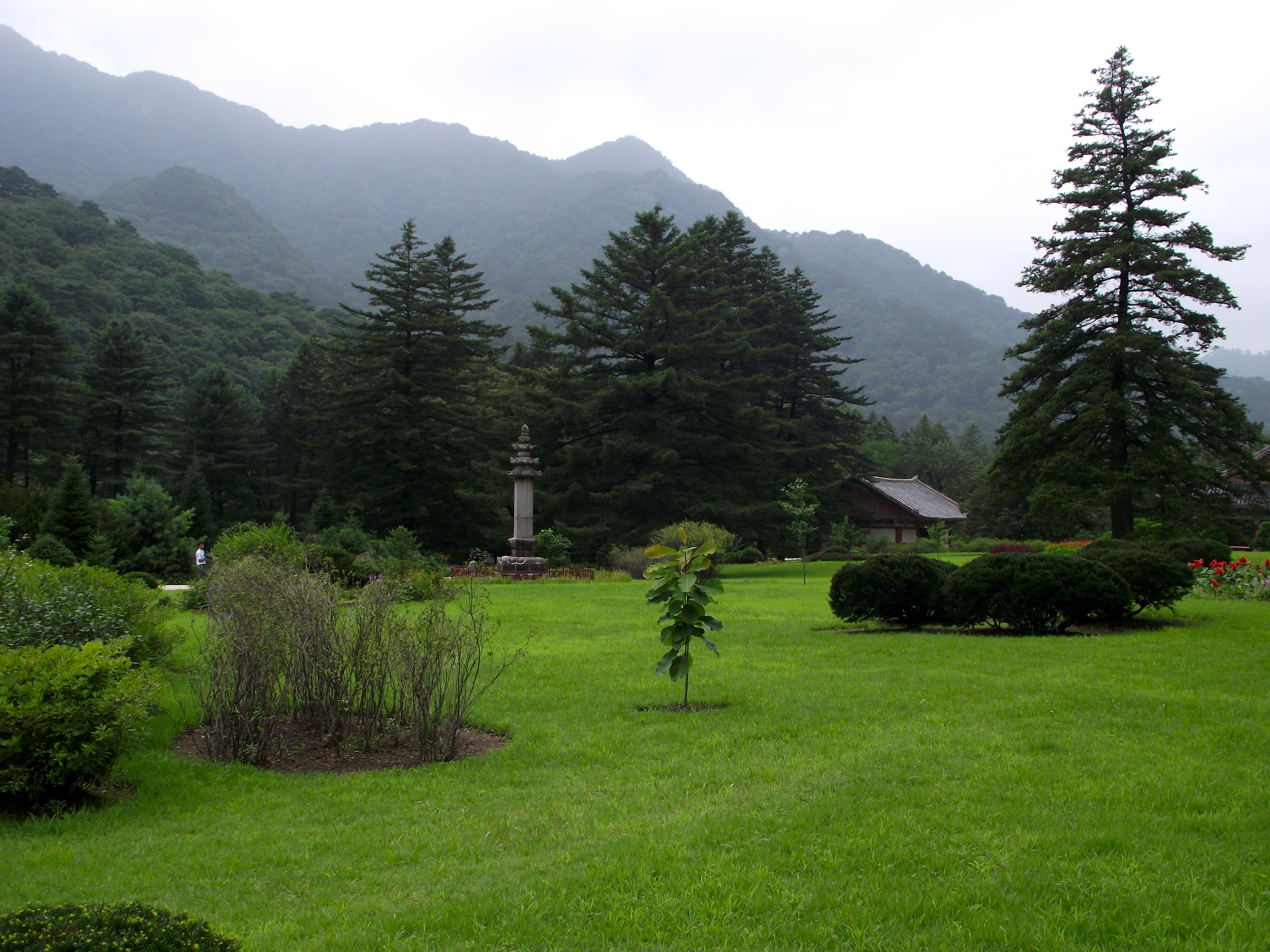
- Myohyang as seen from Pohyon temple

Highest point
- Elevation: 1,909 m (6,263 ft)
- Prominence: 1,151 m (3,776 ft)
- Listing: Ribu
- Coordinates: 40°01′07″N 126°19′59″E

Geography
- Location: North Pyongan Province, North Korea

Korean name
- Hangul: 묘향산
- Hanja: 妙香山
- Lit.: mysterious fragrant mountain
- RR: Myohyangsan
- MR: Myohyangsan

Mount Myohyang (Korean: 묘향산; lit. 'mysterious fragrant mountain') is a mountain in North Korea. It is named for the mystic shapes and fragrances found in the area. In the foundation myth of Gojoseon, the Samguk sagi listed Mount Myohyang as the home of King Tangun, forefather of the Korean people; however, it is now believed that the myth originally meant Paektu Mountain.

== Tourism ==
Myohyang is a North Korean tourist attraction and visited by many national tourists. There are several hiking routes on the mountain. Apart from the view, tourists are attracted by the Pohyon temple, built in the 11th century, the Sangwon hermitage, the Kumgang hermitage, and the Habiro hermitage. The Ryongmun cavern is open to the public.

At Myohyang-san is the International Friendship Exhibition centre, dubbed the world's biggest treasure-house. On exhibit are presents received by North Korean leaders over the years. One building stores the presents given to Kim Il Sung, while a smaller one holds those given to his son Kim Jong Il.

The Hyangsan Hotel caters to luxury visitors, while the Chongchon Hotel is second-class.

== Environment ==
Much of the mountain is covered by mixed broadleaf and coniferous forest and protected in a 16,000 hectares (62 sq mi) national park. Some 7,000 hectares (27 sq mi) has been identified by BirdLife International as an Important Bird Area (IBA).

=== World Biosphere Reserve ===
In 2009 UNESCO designated Mount Myohyang a world biosphere reserve, citing its cultural significance as well as the spectacular cliffs providing habitat for 30 endemic plant species, 16 plant species that are threatened globally and 12 endangered animal species.
