= List of bridges in North Korea =

This is a list of bridges in North Korea.

== Pyongyang ==
Six bridges over the Taedong River, in order west to east

1. Chungsong Bridge (충성의 다리) with off-ramp to Ssuk Islet and Turu Island
2. Yanggak Bridge (양각교) with off-ramp to Yanggak Island
3. Taedong Bridge (대동교) 1905
4. Okryu Bridge (옥류교)
5. Rungna Bridge (릉라교) passing through Rungna Island
6. Chongryu Bridge (청류교) passing through Rungna Island
7. Taedong River Bridge, outside Pyongyang upstream.

=== Inland ===
- Sonjuk Bridge (선죽교), Kaesong 1290AD
- Bridge of No Return (돌아오지 않는 다리)
- 72-Hour Bridge (72시간 다리)

== Border bridges ==
=== With China ===
- New Yalu River Bridge (신압록강대교)
- Sino–Korean Friendship Bridge (조중우의교)
- Linjiang Yalu River Bridge 린장
- Changbai–Hyesan International Bridge (혜장교)
- Tumen Border Bridge, Tumen
- Tumen River Bridge, Hunchun

=== With Russia ===
- Korea–Russia Friendship Bridge (조선–로씨야 우정의 다리)
- Yakov Novichenko Bridge (야꼬브 노비첸꼬명칭 두만강자동차다리)

== See also ==
- List of bridges
- List of tunnels in North Korea
