= Bridge of No Return =

Bridge between North Korea and South Korea, formerly used for prisoner exchanges

Coordinates: 37°57′22.05″N 126°40′14.15″E

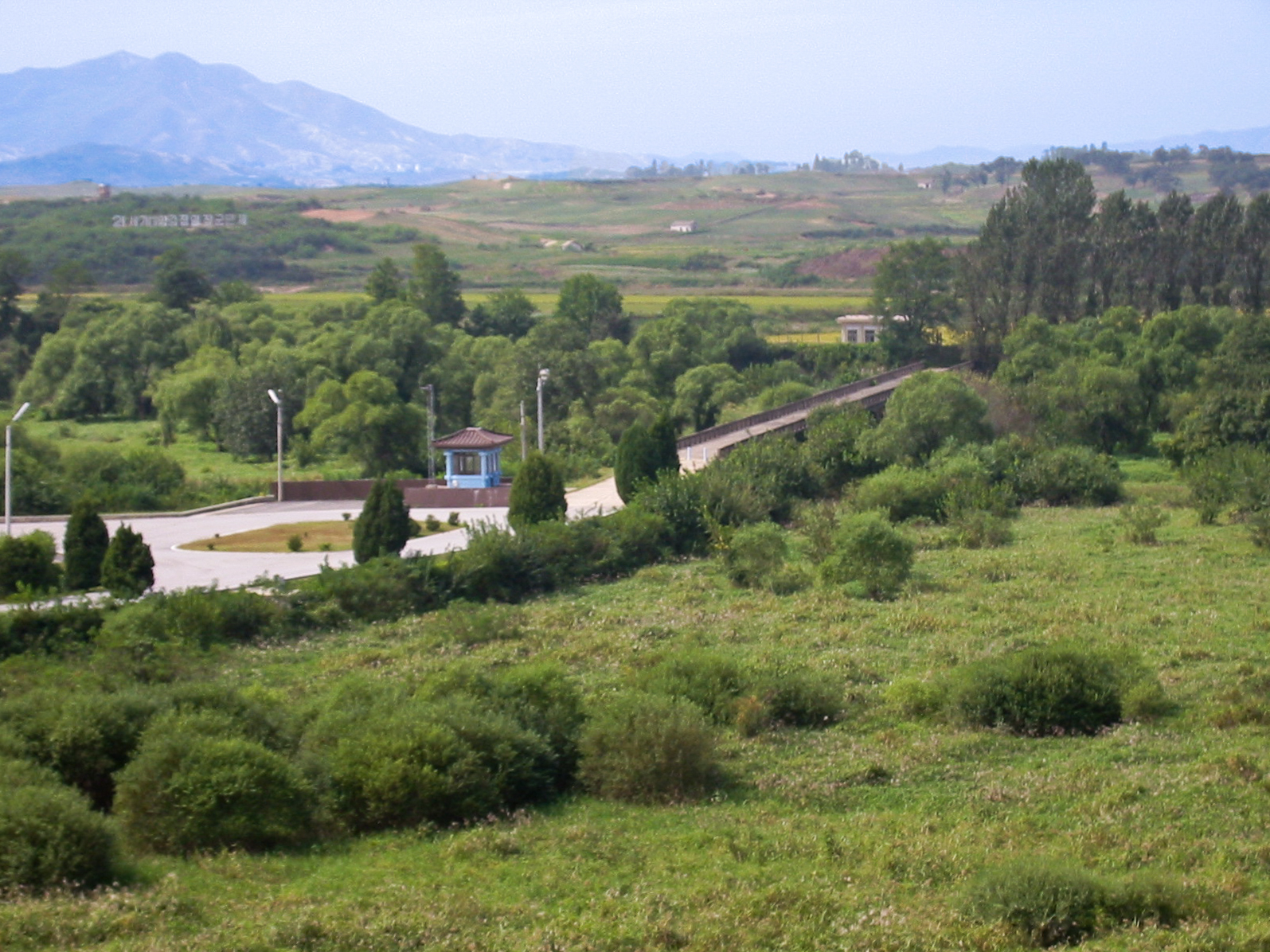

Korean name
- Hangul: 돌아올 수 없는 다리
- RR: Doraol su eomneun dari
- MR: Toraol su ŏmnŭn tari

The "Bridge of No Return" is located in the Joint Security Area (JSA). It crosses the Military Demarcation Line (MDL) between North Korea and South Korea.

== History ==
The bridge was used for prisoner exchanges following the Korean Armistice in 1953. The name originates from the final ultimatum that was given to prisoners of war brought to the bridge for repatriation: they could either remain in the country of their captivity or cross the bridge to return to their homeland. However, once they chose to cross the bridge, they would never be allowed to return, even if they later changed their minds.

The last time the bridge was used for prisoner exchanges was in 1968, when the crew of USS Pueblo was released and ordered to cross into South Korea via the bridge. The bridge was actively used by the North Koreans up until the Korean axe murder incident in August 1976, at which time the United Nations Command (UNC) demanded that the Military Demarcation Line within the Joint Security Area be enforced and clearly marked. Within 72 hours, the North Koreans had built a new bridge (dubbed "The 72-Hour Bridge") on the northern half of the JSA and the original Bridge of No Return was no longer used.

The Military Demarcation Line crosses the middle of the bridge, following a stream. At the end of either side of the bridge are guard houses of the respective countries. The North Korean building is called KPA#4 while the United Nations Command checkpoint was called CP#3 (it was abandoned in the mid-1980s). CP#3, which is surrounded by trees, was only visible from one other UNC site during the winter months, OP#5 (now renamed to CP#3). The North's Korean People's Army (KPA) had made numerous attempts to grab UNC personnel from the old CP#3 and drag them across the bridge into North Korean territory.

Because of this proximity to North Korean territory, being surrounded on all access routes by North Korean checkpoints, and repeated attempts to kidnap the UNC personnel working there, CP#3 was often referred to as "The Loneliest Outpost in the World". As of 2003, the bridge was considered to be in need of repair. According to a report on CNN, the US government has offered to fix the bridge or even replace it, but North Korea has denied permission.

== Major events ==
- Operation Little Switch, April 1953. This operation was a test case for prisoner repatriation, one of the four main issues of contention during two years of negotiation. 605 sick, wounded, and/or injured UNC prisoners were exchanged for 6,030 sick or injured North Korean prisoners.
- Operation Big Switch, April–September 1953. Based on the success of the repatriations undertaken earlier, a general exchange of prisoners began in late April. During Operation Big Switch, prisoners were brought to Panmunjom, on the banks of the Sachong River. Each prisoner was then asked if he wished to cross the river and return to his countrymen or remain with his captors. Once the choice was made there was no turning back—hence the name Bridge of No Return. During this time 13,444 UNC prisoners returned to UNC countries, and 89,493 KPA and CPV prisoners returned to their countries. In March 1953, a further 25,000 KPA soldiers held in ROKA camps had been released into South Korea on President Syngman Rhee's orders in an attempt to wreck the armistice negotiations.
- Release of the crew of the USS Pueblo, December 23, 1968. On January 23, 1968, the USS Pueblo was captured by North Korean naval forces in international waters off the coast of North Korea. After being held prisoner for 11 months, the crew was released and allowed to walk across the bridge while a forced confession by the captain of the vessel was broadcast over loudspeakers. This action was the first in a series of events that escalated tensions between North Korea and the United States and its allies.
- Korean axe murder incident, August 18, 1976. This was the killing of two United States Army officers by North Korean soldiers in the Joint Security Area, near the Bridge of No Return, over the attempt to trim a poplar that obstructed vision between checkpoints, and heightened tensions on the border. This was followed by Operation Paul Bunyan, which ended in the felling of the tree by Task Force Vierra.

== Ceremonies on the bridge ==
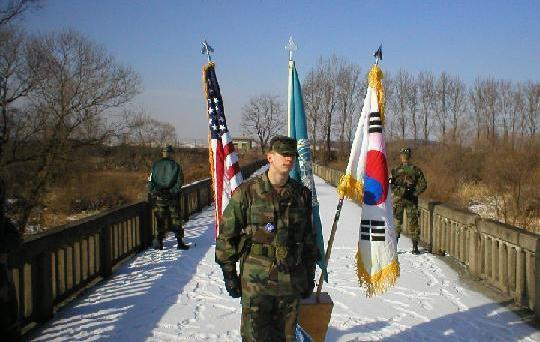
U.S. Army soldier posing during a 2003 ceremony at the middle of the bridge, in front of the flags of the UN, the US, and South Korea, while two guards are facing toward North Korea

U.S. Army soldiers who are stationed at Camp Bonifas or Camp Liberty Bell in the Joint Security Area are offered the opportunity to have their promotion or reenlistment ceremonies held in the center of the Bridge of No Return. The bridge is split in half by the Military Demarcation Line which separates North Korean territory from South Korean territory. During a U.S. or ROK (Republic of Korea) ceremony, two guards are posted at the Demarcation Line facing west (toward North Korea).

== Gallery ==
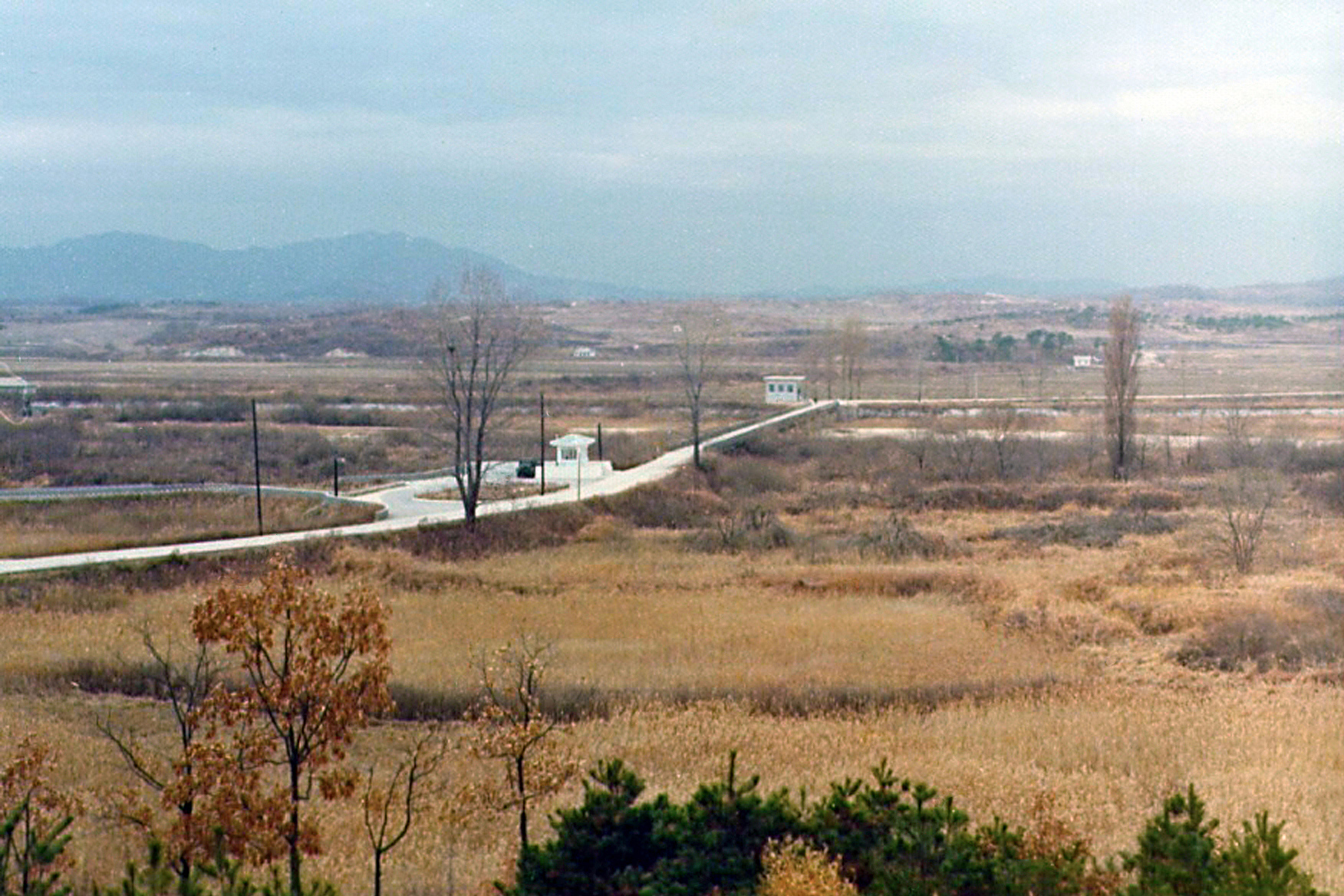
The Bridge of No Return, December 1975. The large tree next to the road leading to the bridge would become the subject of the Axe Murder incident.

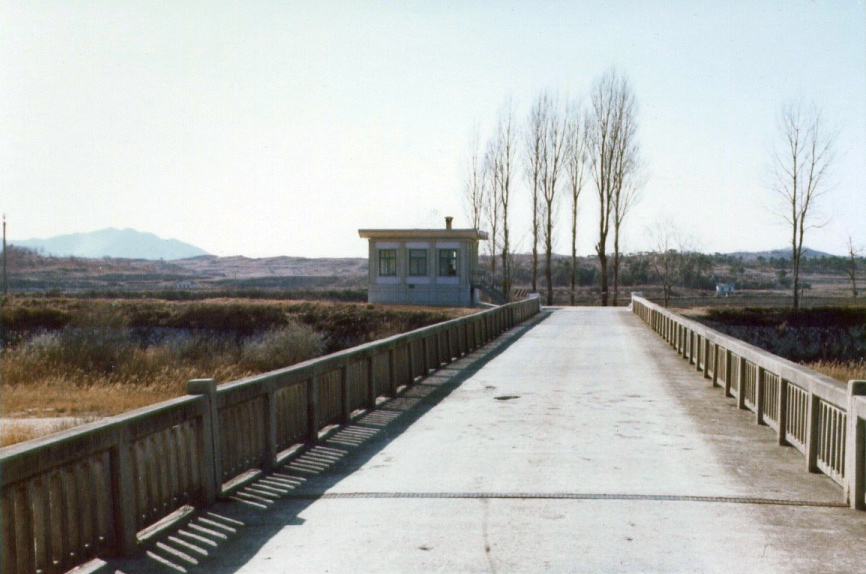
Looking across The Bridge of No Return, March 1976

Joint Security Area in 1976

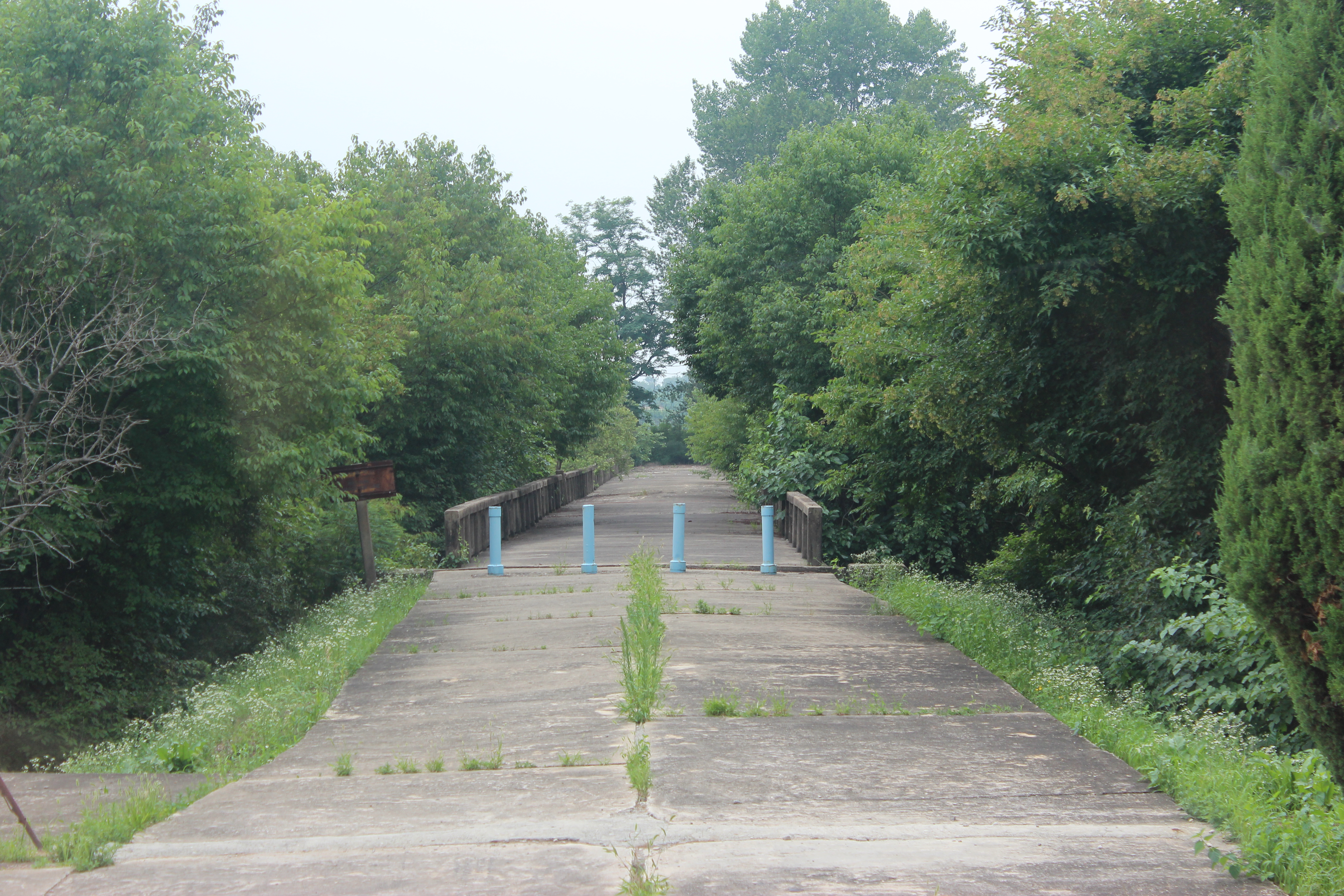
View of the bridge, 2012

== See also ==
- Division of Korea
- Glienicke Bridge
- Korean Demilitarized Zone
- Korean Armistice
- Korean War
- List of international bridges
