= Panmunjom axe murder incident =

1976 killing in the Joint Security Area

Coordinates: 37°57′21.4″N 126°40′21.4″E

- Panmunjom axe atrocity incident
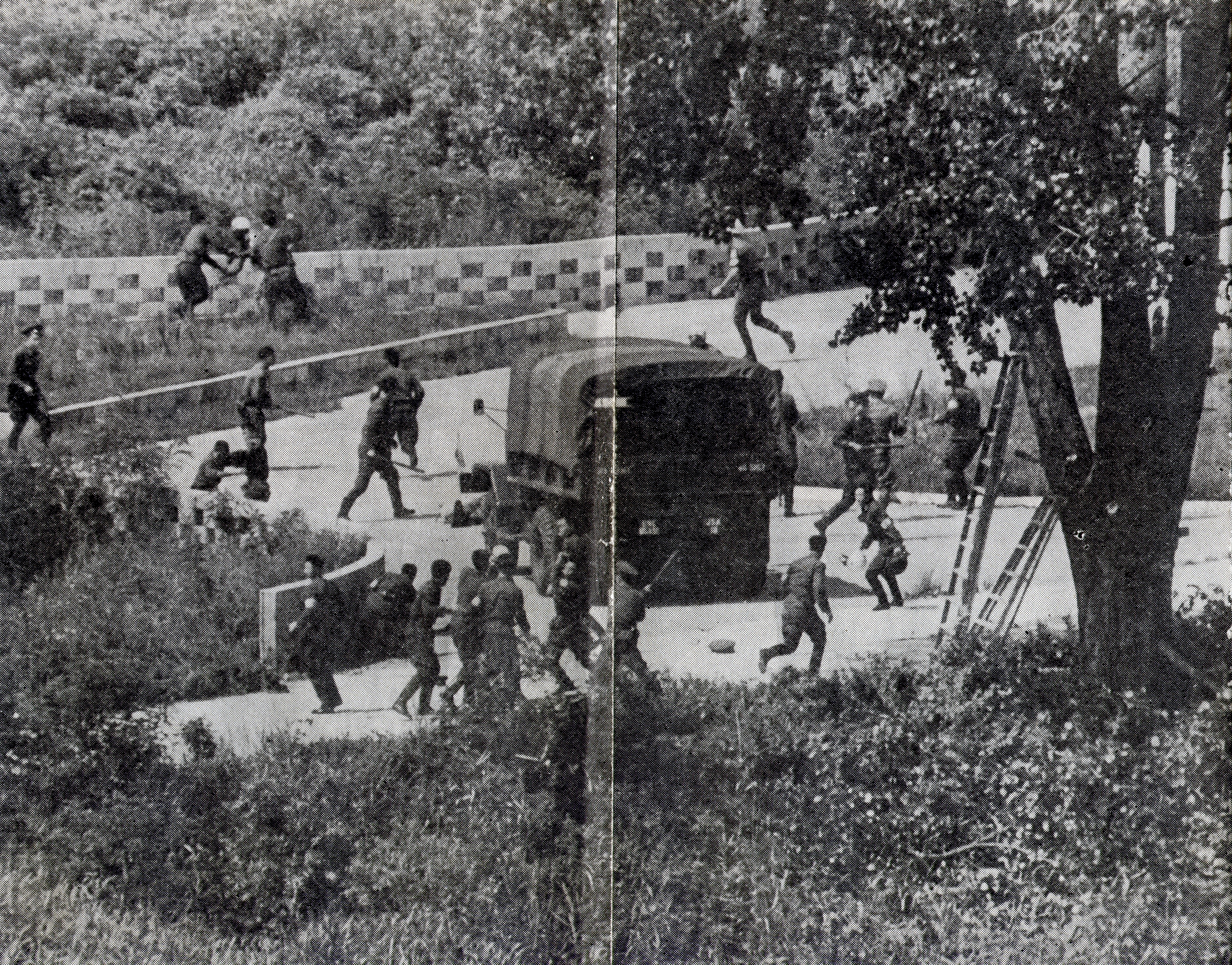
- North Korean and UNC forces during the 1976 axe attack

Panmunjom axe atrocity incident
- Hangul: 판문점 도끼 만행 사건
- Hanja: 板門店 도끼 蠻行事件
- RR: Panmunjeom dokki manhaeng sageon
- MR: P'anmunjŏm tokki manhaeng sakŏn

The Panmunjom axe murder incident (Korean: 판문점 도끼 살인 사건) was the killing of two United Nations Command officers, Captain Arthur Bonifas and First Lieutenant Mark Barrett, by North Korean soldiers on August 18, 1976, in the Joint Security Area (JSA) in the Korean Demilitarized Zone (DMZ). The officers, from the United States Army, had been part of a work party trimming a poplar tree in the JSA.

Three days later, US and South Korean forces launched Operation Paul Bunyan, an operation that cut down the tree with a show of force (including helicopters and nuclear-capable bombers) to intimidate North Korea. Directly following the operation, North Korean president Kim Il Sung sent a statement to US military representatives de-emphasizing the violence and promoting mutual peace, which paused escalations.

The incident is also known alternatively as the Korean axe atrocity incident, the hatchet incident, the poplar tree incident, and the tree trimming incident.

== Background ==
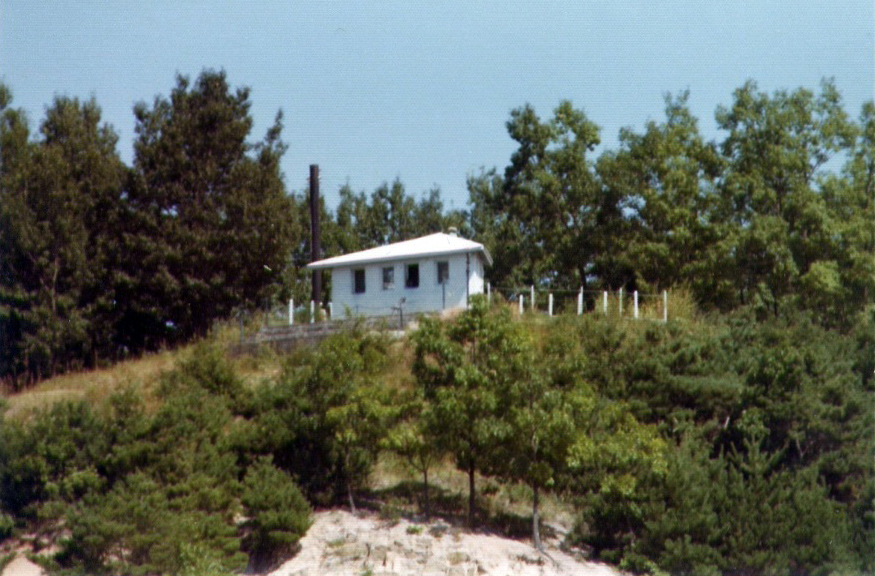
OP No. 5 from which the pictures of the axe murder were taken

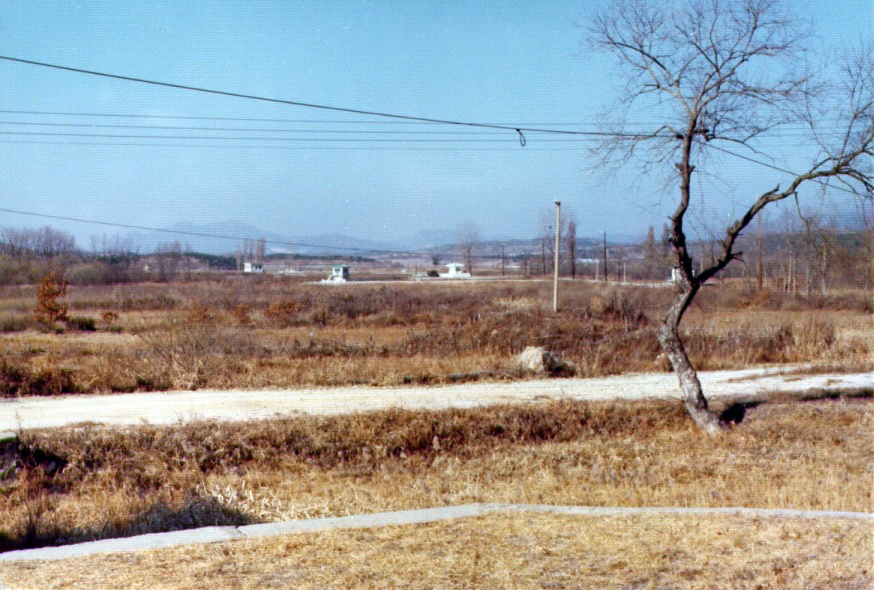
View from KPA No. 7 (near CP No. 2) towards CP No. 3, January 1976. Also visible in the picture (left to right) are KPA No. 4 across the Bridge of No Return, KPA No. 8 and KPA No. 5 (partially obscured behind the tree). This picture was taken early in the morning, before the North Koreans opened this checkpoint for the day.

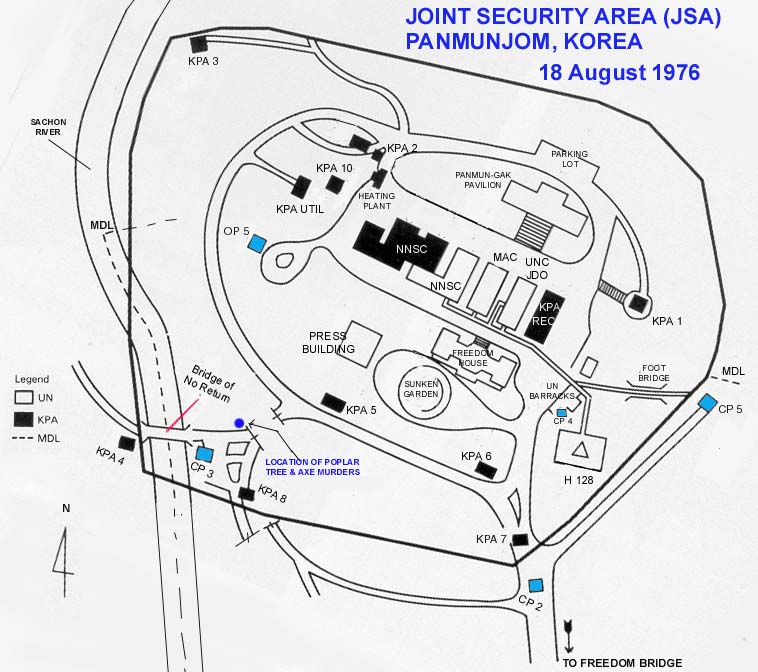
The layout of the Joint Security Area in 1976. The Military Demarcation Line was not enforced in the JSA prior to the incident.

In the Joint Security Area (JSA), near the Bridge of No Return (through which the Military Demarcation Line runs), a 30-metre (98 ft) poplar tree blocked the line of sight between a United Nations Command (UNC) checkpoint and an observation post.

On one occasion before the incident, North Korean soldiers had held a group of US troops at gunpoint. The Joint Security Force (JSF) company commander, Captain Arthur Bonifas, was then sent to force the North Koreans to stand down and to bring the Americans back to safety, and he did so successfully. Bonifas was later one of the soldiers killed in the axe murders.

Wayne Kirkbride, an officer at the DMZ at the time, recalled hearing that North Korean soldiers had told members of a work force sent to cut the tree that they could not, as it had been planted by their leader, Kim Il Sung.

== Initial trimming and killings ==
On August 18, 1976, a group of five Korean Service Corps (KSC) personnel were escorted by a UNC security team consisting of Captain Arthur Bonifas; his South Korean army counterpart, Captain Kim; the platoon leader of the current platoon in the area, First Lieutenant Mark Barrett; and 11 enlisted personnel, both American and South Korean.

The two captains did not wear sidearms, as members of the Joint Security Area were limited to five armed officers and 30 armed enlisted personnel at a time. However, there were mattocks in the back of the 2 1/2-ton truck. The KSC workers had the axes that they had brought to prune the tree branches.

After the pruning began, about 15 North Korean soldiers appeared, commanded by Senior Lieutenant Pak Cheol (박철), whom the UNC soldiers had nicknamed "Lieutenant Bulldog" because of a history of confrontations. Pak and his subordinates appeared to observe the pruning without concern for approximately 15 minutes. Then, Pak abruptly told the UNC to cease the activity and stated that the tree could not be pruned. Captain Bonifas ordered the detail to continue and turned his back on the North Koreans.

After being ignored by Bonifas, Pak sent a runner across the Bridge of No Return. Within minutes, a North Korean guard truck crossed the bridge and approximately 20 more North Korean guards disembarked carrying crowbars and clubs. Pak again demanded that the pruning cease. When Bonifas again turned his back on him, Pak removed his watch, carefully wrapped it in a handkerchief, placed it in his pocket, and shouted, "Kill the bastards!" Using axes dropped by the tree pruners, the Korean People's Army (KPA) forces attacked both US soldiers, Bonifas and Barrett, and wounded all but one of the UNC guards.

Bonifas was knocked to the ground by Pak and then bludgeoned to death by at least five North Koreans, and Barrett jumped over a low wall that led past a 4.5-metre (15 ft) deep tree-filled depression just across the road from the tree. The depression was not visible from the road because of the dense grass and small trees. The entire fight lasted for only 20 to 30 seconds before the UNC force dispersed and the North Korean guards placed Bonifas's body in their truck. There was no sign of Barrett, and the two UNC guards at OP No. 5 could not see him.

The UNC force observed the North Korean guards at KPA No. 8 along the UNC emergency egress road exhibiting strange behaviour, in that one guard would take an axe and go down into the depression for a couple of minutes and then come back and hand the axe to another guard, who would repeat the action. This went on for approximately 90 minutes until the UNC guards at OP No. 5 were informed that Barrett was missing, when they informed their superiors about the KPA activity in the depression. A search-and-rescue squad was quickly dispatched and found that Barrett had been attacked with the axe by the North Koreans. Barrett was recovered and transported to a hospital in Seoul via an aid station at Camp Greaves; he died on the journey.

Captain Shirron (Bonifas's replacement), Captain Shaddix, the joint duty officer's driver, the joint duty officer, and the OP No. 5 guard witnessed the attack from OP No. 5 and recorded the incident with a black-and-white film camera, which ran out of film, and Shaddix's 35 mm camera with a telephoto lens. The UNC guard at CP No. 3 (Bridge of No Return) recorded the incident with a movie camera.

== Reaction ==
Shortly after the incident, the North Korean media began airing reports of the fight. The North Korean version stated:

Around 10:45 a.m. today, the Americans sent in 14 soldiers with axes into the Joint Security Area to cut down the trees on their own accord, although such a work should be mutually consented beforehand. Four persons from our side went to the spot to warn them not to continue the work without our consent. Against our persuasion, they attacked our guards en masse and committed a serious provocative act of beating our men, wielding murderous weapons and depending on the fact that they outnumbered us. Our guards could not but resort to self-defence measures under the circumstances of this reckless provocation.

Within four hours of the attack, Kim Jong Il, the son of the North Korean leader, Kim Il Sung, addressed the Conference of Non-Aligned Nations in Colombo, Sri Lanka, and presented a prepared document describing the incident as an unprovoked attack on North Korean guards that had been led by American officers. He then introduced a resolution asking the conference to condemn that day's grave US provocation, and he called on participants to endorse both the withdrawal of US forces from South Korea and the dissolution of the UNC, which was seconded by Cuba. The members of the conference passed the resolution.

The CIA considered the attack to have been planned by the North Korean government. A variety of responses were evaluated. Readiness levels for American forces in South Korea were increased to DEFCON 3 early on August 19. Rocket and artillery attacks in the area were considered but discounted because of an unfavorable 4:1 ratio of artillery pieces, and South Korean President Park Chung Hee did not want military action.

== Operation Paul Bunyan ==
Operation Paul Bunyan
- Part of the post-armistice Korean conflicts
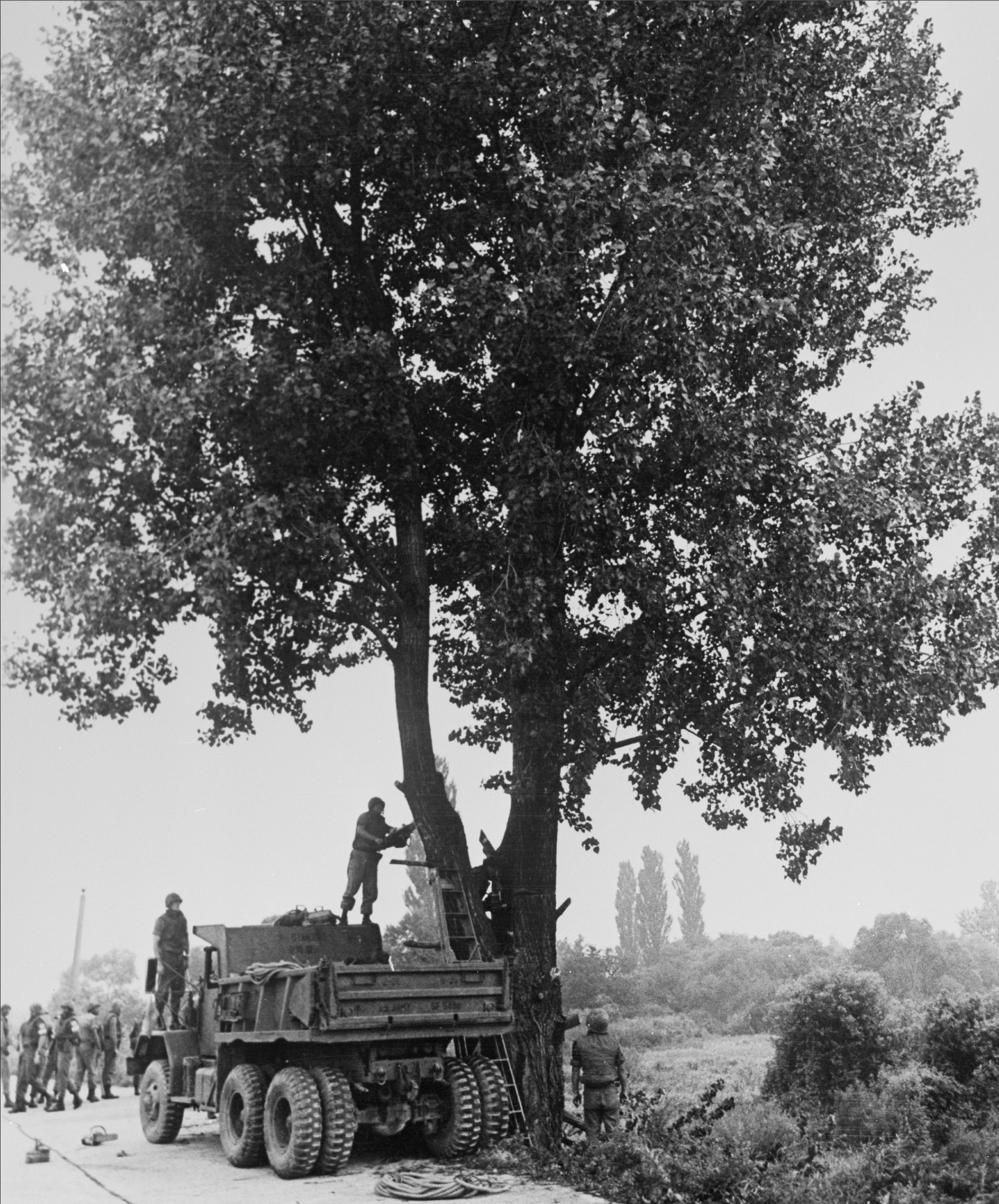
- South Korean soldiers cutting down the tree using a chainsaw
Date	August 21, 1976
Location	Joint Security Area, Korean Demilitarized Zone, Korea
Result	Tree successfully cut down

Belligerents
United States; South Korea	North Korea

Commanders and leaders
General Richard G. Stilwell	Lieutenant Pak Cheol

Units involved
United States Army Support Group (United Nations) JSF 1st and 2nd Platoon (Fourth Republic of Korea) 1st Special Forces Brigade	Unknown

Strength
813 infantry 27 helicopters 1 tank	150 to 200 infantry

Casualties and losses
2 US soldiers	1 tree

In response to the incident, the UNC determined that instead of trimming the branches that obscured visibility, they would cut down the tree with the aid of overwhelming force. The parameters of the operation were decided in the White House, where US President Gerald Ford had held crisis talks. Ford and his advisors were concerned about making a show of strength to chasten North Korea without causing further escalation. The operation, named after the mythical lumberjack, was conceived as a show of force by the US and South Korea and was carefully managed to prevent further escalation. It was planned over two days by General Richard G. Stilwell and his staff at the UNC headquarters in Seoul.

=== Forces ===
Operation Paul Bunyan was carried out on August 21 at 07:00, three days after the killings. A convoy of 23 American and South Korean vehicles ("Task Force Vierra", named after Lieutenant Colonel Victor S. Vierra, commander of the United States Army Support Group) drove into the JSA without any warning to the North Koreans, who had one observation post staffed at that hour. In the vehicles were two eight-man teams of military engineers (from the 2nd Engineer Battalion, 2nd Infantry Division) equipped with chainsaws to cut down the tree.

The teams were accompanied by two 30-man security platoons from the Joint Security Force, who were armed with pistols and axe handles. The 1st Platoon secured the northern entrance to the JSA via the Bridge of No Return, while the 2nd Platoon secured the southern edge of the area.

Concurrently, a team from B Company, commanded by Captain Walter Seifried, had activated the detonation systems for the charges on Freedom Bridge and had the 165mm main gun of the M728 combat engineer vehicle aimed mid-span to ensure that the bridge would fall if the order was given for its destruction. Also, B Company, supporting E Company (bridge), were building M4T6 rafts on the Imjin River in case the situation required emergency evacuation by that route.

In addition, a 64-man task force of the ROK Army 1st Special Forces Brigade accompanied them, armed with clubs and trained in taekwondo, supposedly without firearms. However, once they parked their trucks near the Bridge of No Return, they started throwing out the sandbags that lined the truck bottoms and handing out M16 rifles and M79 grenade launchers that had been concealed below them. Several of the commandos also had M18 Claymore mines strapped to their chests with the firing mechanism in their hands, and were shouting at the North Koreans to cross the bridge.

A US infantry company in 20 utility helicopters and seven Cobra attack helicopters circled behind them. Behind these helicopters, B-52 Stratofortresses came from Guam escorted by US F-4 Phantom IIs from Kunsan Air Base and South Korean F-5 and F-86 fighters were visible flying across the sky at high altitude. F-4Es from Osan AB and Taegu Air Base, South Korea, F-111 bombers of the 366th Tactical Fighter Wing out of Mountain Home Air Force Base, were stationed, and F-4C and F-4D Phantoms from the 18th TFW Kadena Air Base and Clark Air Base were also deployed. The aircraft carrier USS Midway task force had also been moved to a station just offshore.

Near the edges of the DMZ, many more heavily armed US and South Korean infantry, artillery including the Second Battalion, 71st Air Defense Regiment armed with Improved Hawk missiles, and armor were waiting to back up the special operations team. Bases near the DMZ were prepared for demolition in the case of a military response. The defence condition (DEFCON) was elevated on order of General Stilwell, as was later recounted in Colonel De LaTeur's research paper. In addition, 12,000 additional troops were ordered to Korea, including 1,800 Marines from Okinawa. During the operation, nuclear-capable strategic bombers circled over the JSA.

Altogether, Task Force Vierra consisted of 813 men: almost all of the men of the United States Army Support Group of which the Joint Security Force was a part, a South Korean reconnaissance company, a South Korean Special Forces company that had infiltrated the river area by the bridge the night before, and members of a reinforced composite rifle company from the 9th Infantry Regiment. In addition to this force, every UNC force in the rest of South Korea was on battle alert.

=== Operation ===
The engineers in the convoy (two teams from B Company and C Company, 2nd Engineer Battalion, led by First Lieutenant Patrick Ono, who had conducted a reconnaissance of the tree disguised as a Korean corporal two days earlier) left their vehicles once the convoy arrived and immediately started cutting down the tree while standing on the roof of their truck. The 2nd Platoon truck was positioned to block the Bridge of No Return. The remainder of the task force dispersed to their assigned areas around the tree and assumed their roles of guarding the engineers.

North Korea quickly responded with about 150 to 200 troops, who were armed with machine guns and assault rifles. The North Korean troops arrived mostly in buses but did not leave them at first and watched the events unfold. Upon seeing their arrival, Lieutenant Colonel Vierra relayed a radio communication, and the helicopters and Air Force jets became visible over the horizon. Yokota Air Base in Japan was on alert. The flight-line runway was "nose to tail" with a dozen C-130s ready to provide backup. The North Koreans quickly got out of their buses and began setting up two-man machine gun positions, where they watched in silence as the tree was felled in 42 minutes (three minutes less than Stilwell's estimate), which avoided a violent confrontation. Two road barriers, installed by the North Koreans, were removed, and the South Korean troops vandalised two North Korean guard posts. The tree stump, around 8 ft (2.4 m) tall, was left standing.

Five minutes into the operation, the UNC notified its North Korean counterparts at the JSA that a UN work party had entered the JSA "in order to peacefully finish the work left unfinished" on August 18. The attempt at intimidation was apparently successful, and according to an intelligence analyst monitoring the North Korea tactical radio net, the accumulation of force "blew their fucking minds."

== Aftermath ==
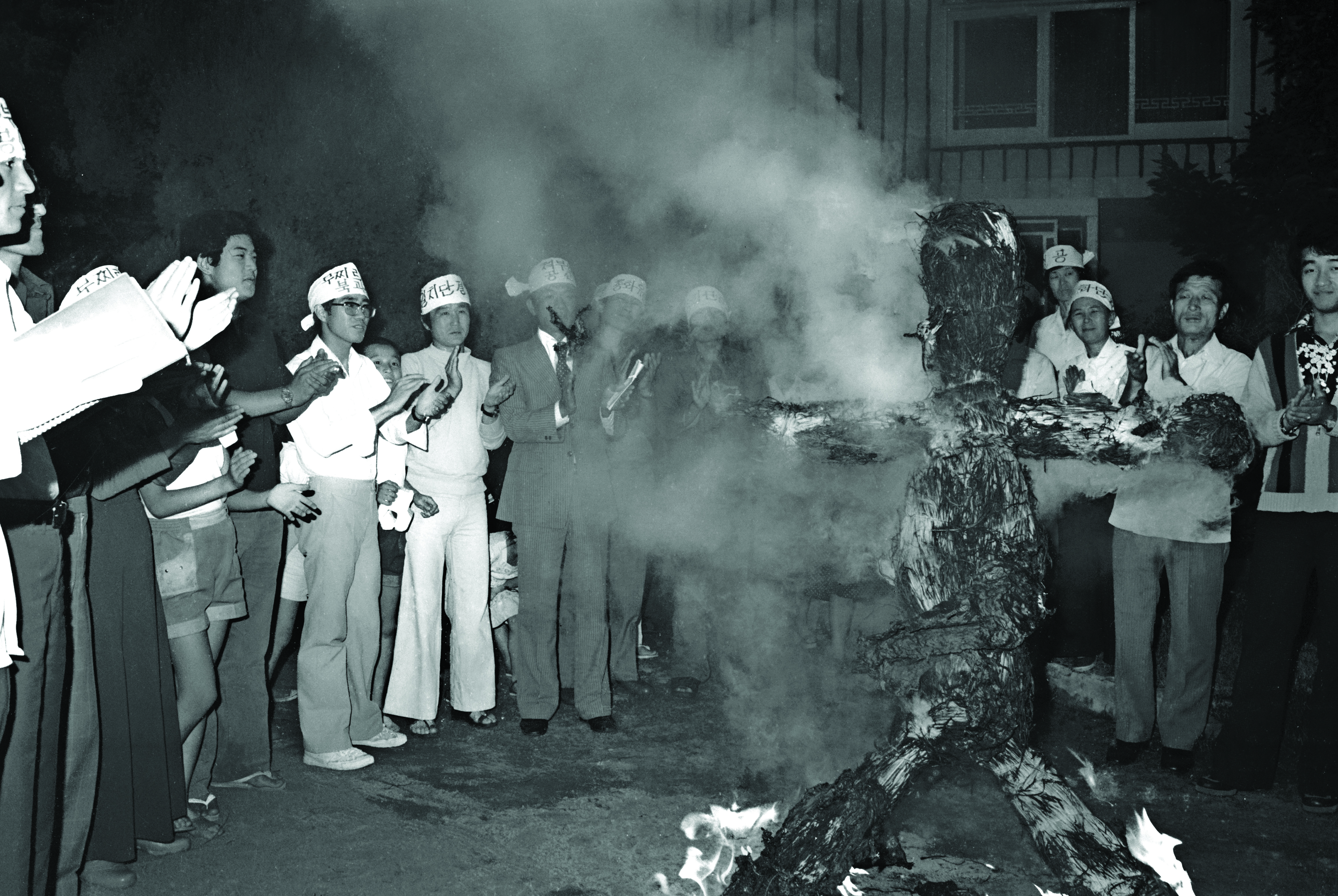
In response to the incident, anti-North Korean sentiment spiked in South Korea, where South Koreans burn a paper effigy of North Korean leader Kim Il Sung in Seoul.

Although the operation was carried out peacefully, there was concern that it could spark a wider conflict. The incident led to increased tensions along the Korean Demilitarised Zone but did not develop into full-scale war. Some shots were fired at the US helicopter that carried Major General Morris Brady. It circled Panmunjom later that day, but no one was injured.

The United Nations Command had demanded that the North Koreans "punish those involved and make adequate reparations to the families of those killed and injured." Later, on the day of Operation Paul Bunyan, it received a message from Kim Il Sung expressing regret at the incident. The message was relayed by the senior member of the North Korean MAC team (Major General Han Ju-kyong) to the senior UNC MAC member (Rear Admiral Mark Frudden): "It was a good thing that no big incident occurred at Panmunjom for a long period. However, it is regretful that an incident occurred in the Joint Security Area, Panmunjom this time. An effort must be made so that such incidents may not recur in the future. For this purpose both sides should make efforts. We urge your side to prevent the provocation. Our side will never provoke first, but take self-defensive measures only when provocation occurs. This is our consistent stand." While not going far enough to satisfy a previously discussed "acceptable" Northern response, the US administration decided to emphasize it as a step in the right direction, as it was the first time since the Korean War armistice in 1953 that the North had accepted responsibility for violence along the DMZ.

The Joint Security Area's advance camp (Camp Kitty Hawk) was then later renamed "Camp Bonifas" in honor of the slain company commander. The Barrett Readiness Facility, located inside the JSA and housing the battalion's north mission platoon, was named for Barrett. The site of the tree, the stump of which was cut down in 1987, became the location of a stone monument with a brass plate inscribed in the memory of both men. The UNC has held commemorative ceremonies at the monument on anniversaries.

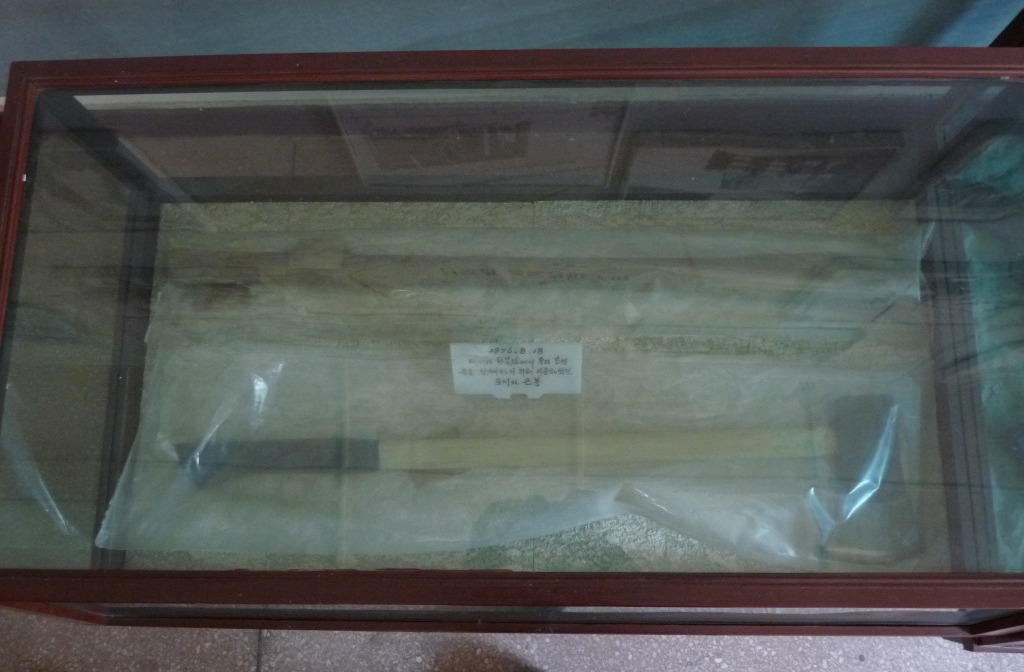
Tools which were alleged to have been involved in the incident

The nearby UNC checkpoint (CP No. 3, next to the Bridge of No Return) was no longer used after the mid-1980s when concrete-filled bollards were placed in the road to make vehicle passage impossible.

The incident also prompted the separation of personnel from the two sides within the JSA as a way to avoid further incidents.

An axe and an axe handle that were supposedly used in the incident are on display in the North Korea Peace Museum.

Moon Jae-in, who would later become the 12th President of South Korea, participated in Operation Paul Bunyan as a rear supporting member of the Republic of Korea 1st Special Forces Brigade.

=== Swagger stick ===
General William J. Livsey, who was the commanding general of the Eighth US Army in South Korea from 1984 to 1987, publicly carried a swagger stick that was carved from wood collected from the tree at the center of the incident. The swagger stick was ceremoniously passed on to General Louis C. Menetrey when Livsey retired from his command.

== Image gallery ==
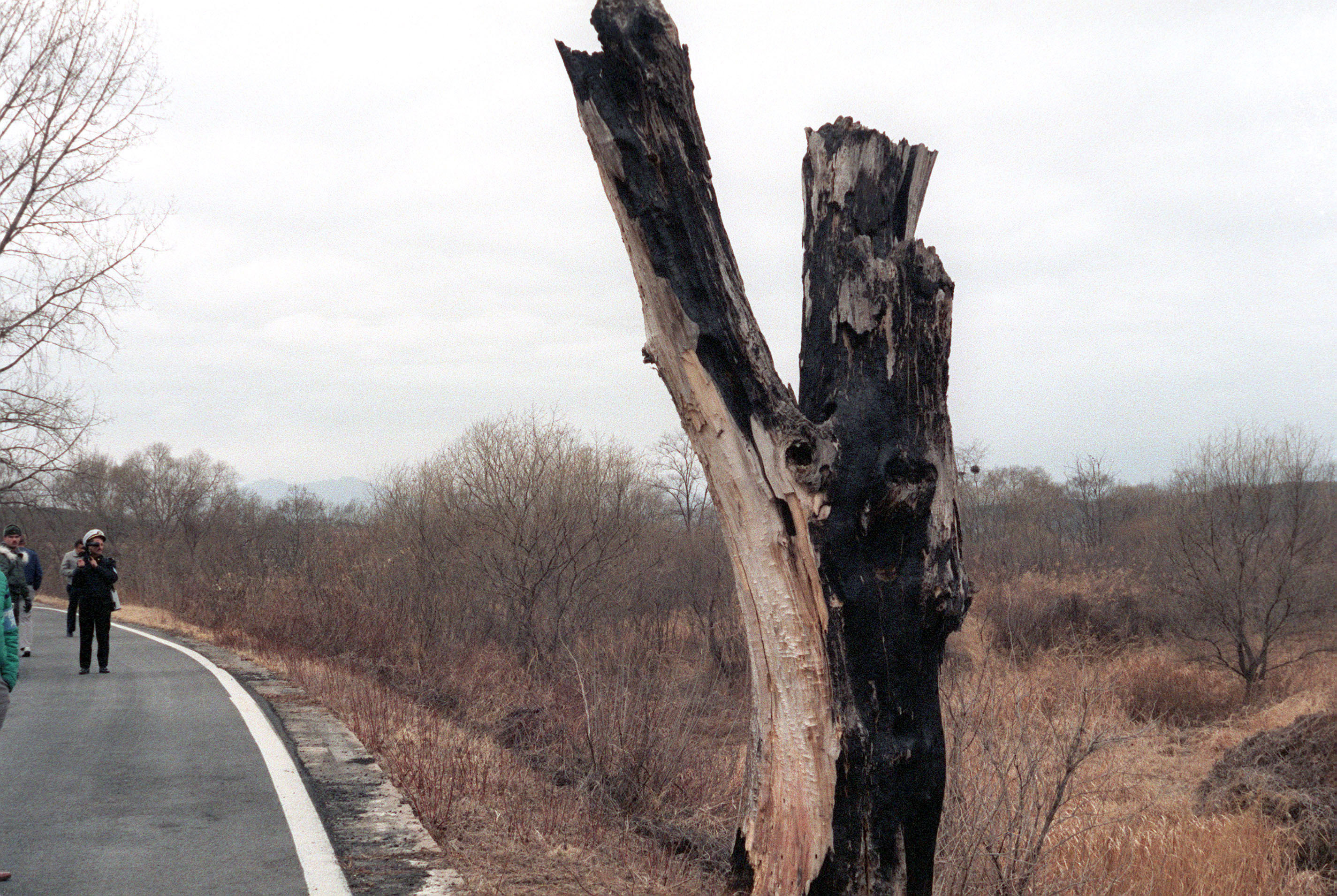
Remains of the tree that was the object of the incident, as seen in 1984. Deliberately left standing after Operation Paul Bunyan, the stump was replaced by a monument in 1987

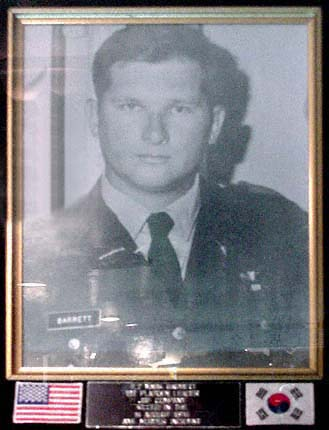
Portrait photo of Lt. Mark Barrett

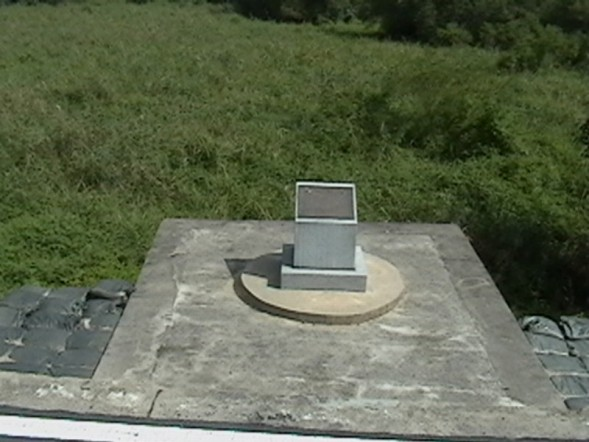
Memorial plaque for the victims of the attack

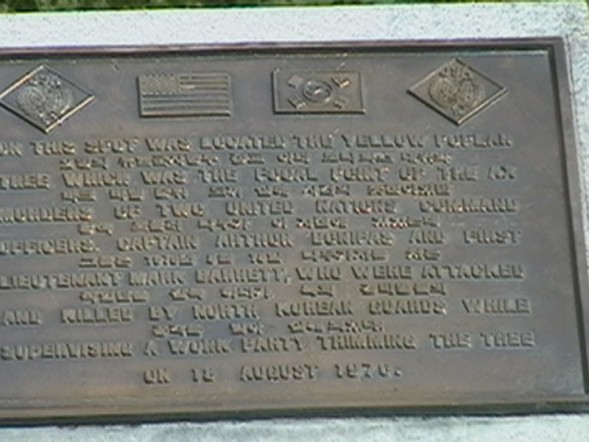
Inscription

Memorial plaque in Paju

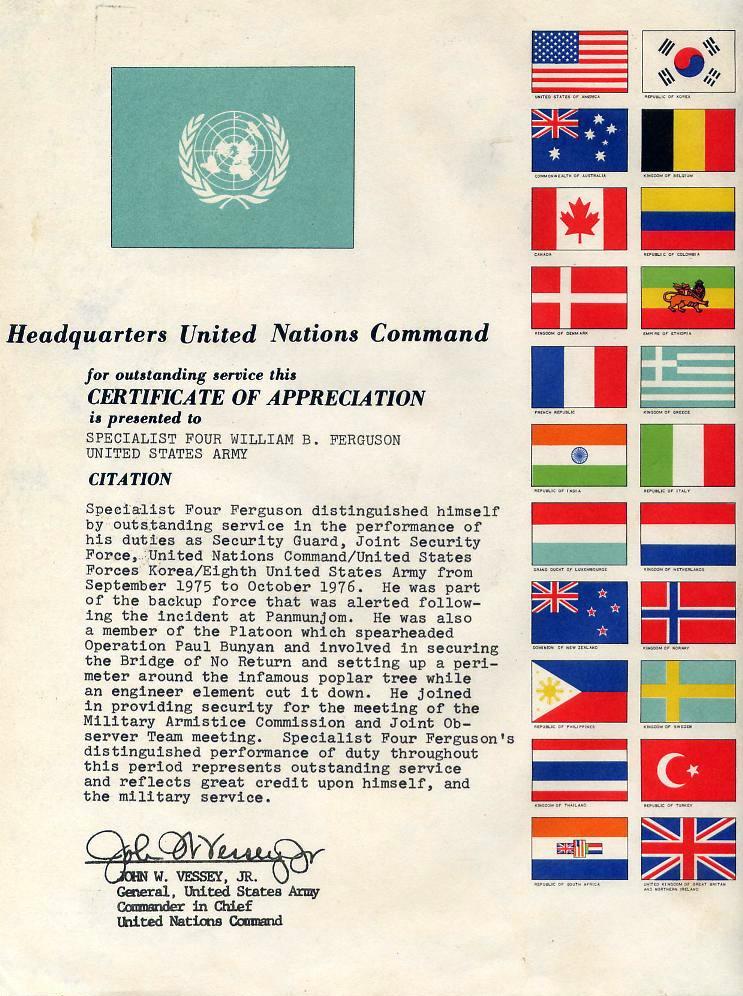
UNC Certificate of Appreciation awarded for Operation Paul Bunyan

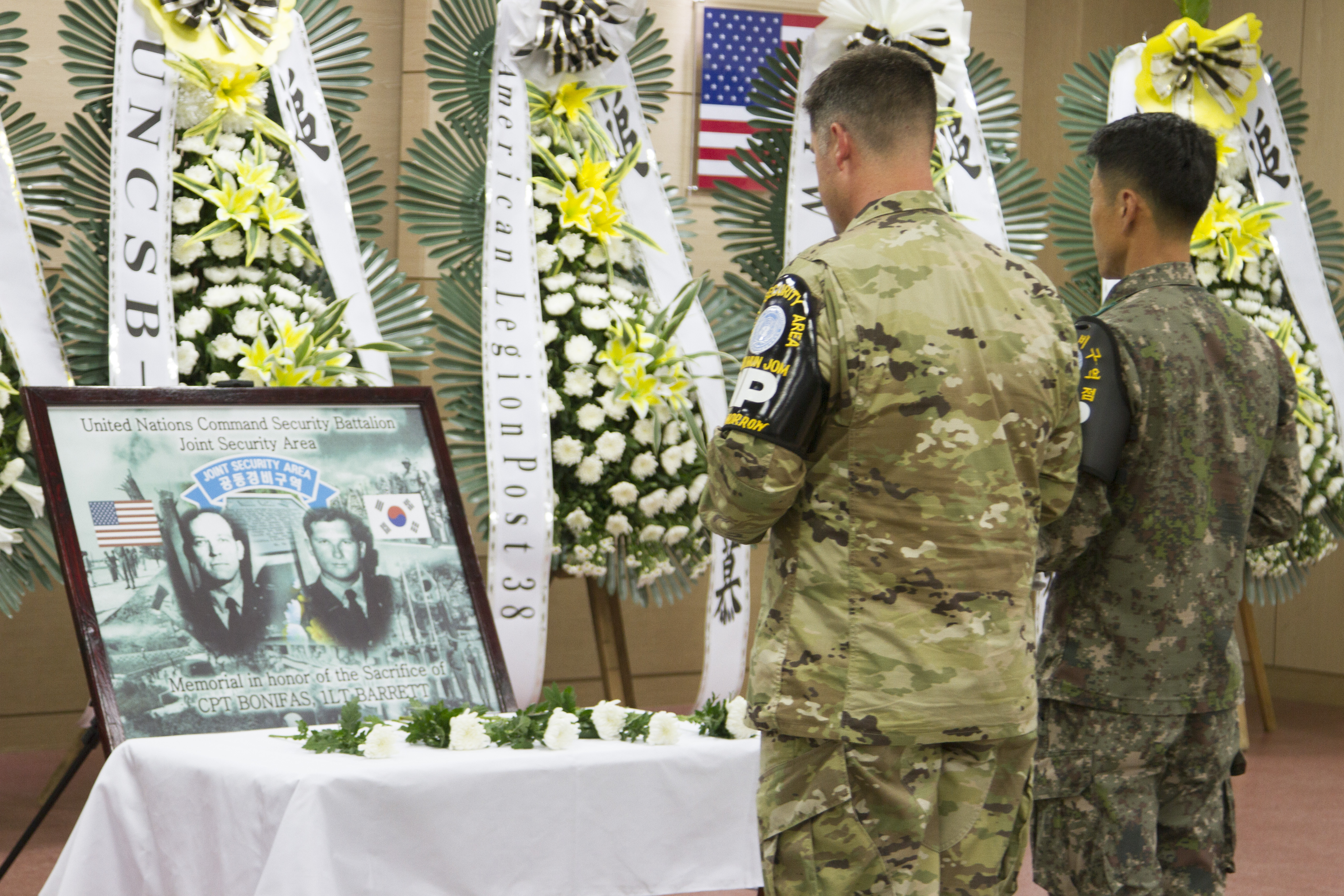
US and South Korean forces commemorate the occasion in 2019

== See also ==
- 72-Hour Bridge, built by North Korea after the incident
- 2010 Israel–Lebanon border clash, an incident after an Israeli attempted to cut down a tree
- Major Henderson incident, a North Korean beating of an American army officer that occurred the previous year
