= Joint Security Area =

Part of the Korean Demilitarized Zone

Coordinates: 37°57′21″N 126°40′36″E

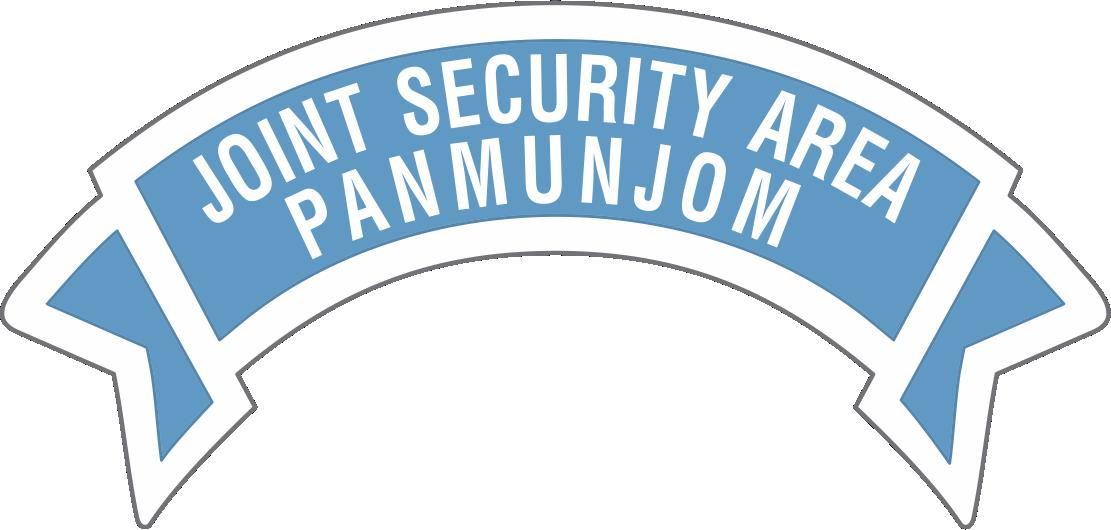
Joint Security Area
- 공동경비구역
- Korean Demilitarized Zone
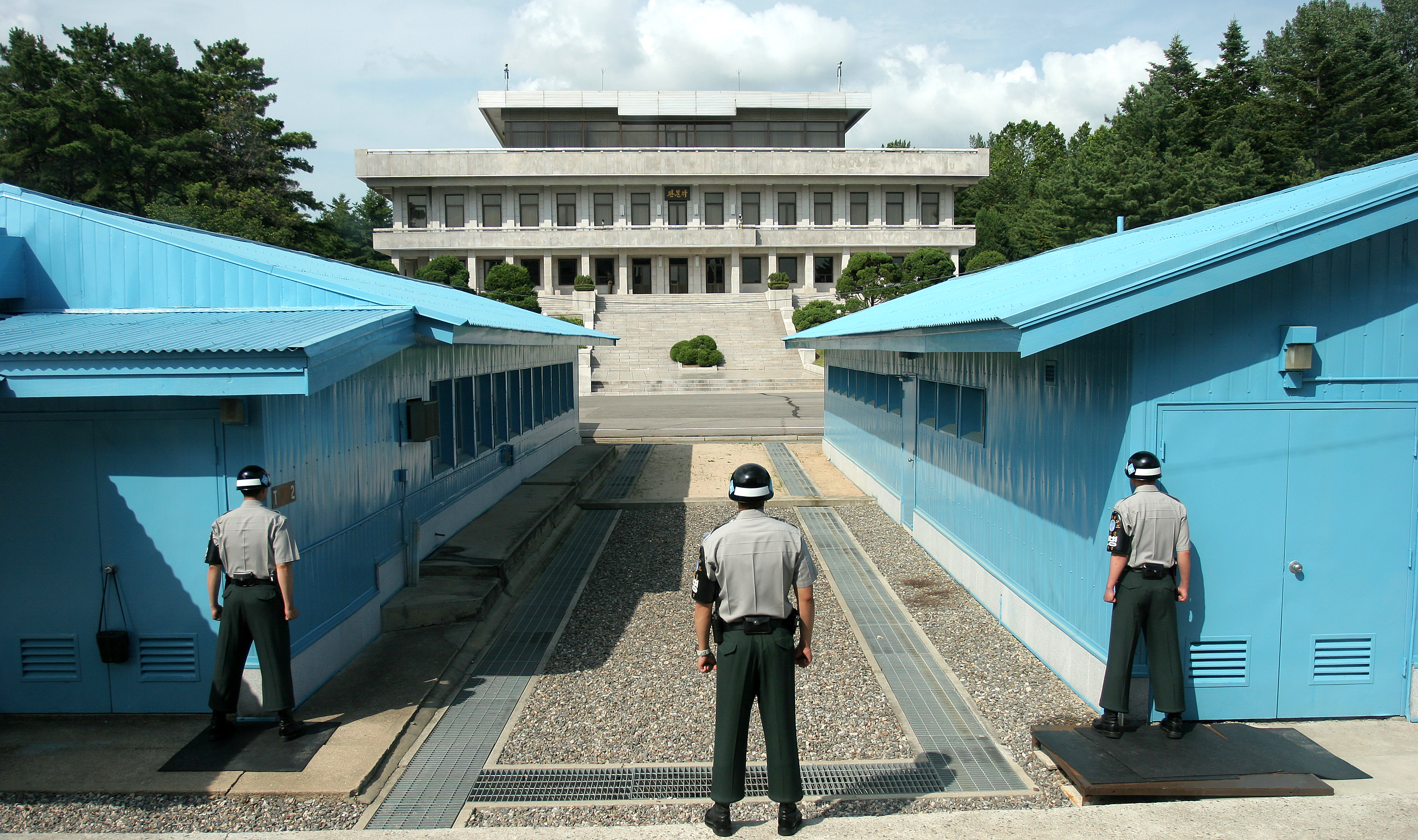
- South Korean soldiers standing guard at the JSA between the blue buildings. To the rear, three-story Panmungak Hall, in North Korea.

Site information
- Type: DMZ

Korean name
- Hangul: 공동경비구역
- Hanja: 共同警備區域
- RR: Gongdong gyeongbi guyeok
- MR: Kongdong kyŏngbi kuyŏk

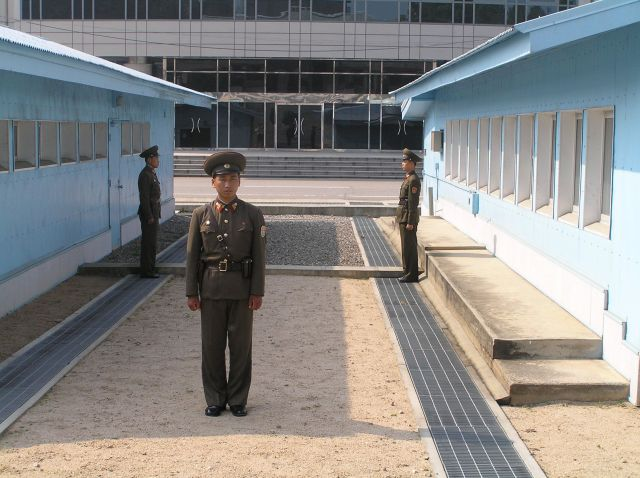
North Korean soldiers standing guard at the JSA between the blue buildings. View from the north. To the rear, the ground floor of Freedom House, in South Korea. The low-level concrete ledge running between the two soldiers is the border mark in the security area.

The Joint Security Area (JSA, often referred to as the Truce Village or Panmunjom) is the only portion of the Korean Demilitarized Zone (DMZ) where North and South Korean forces stand face-to-face. The JSA is used by the two Koreas for diplomatic engagements and, until March 1991, was also the site of military negotiations between North Korea and the United Nations Command (UNC).

The JSA has been the site of numerous events and incidents since its establishment in 1953, the first of which was the repatriation of prisoners of war (POWs) after the cessation of hostilities, across the Bridge of No Return. In 2018, North and South Korean officials agreed to clear the JSA of all landmines, weapons and guard posts. This withdrawal was complete on October 25, 2018, and the JSA now just contains 35 unarmed security guards. It was further agreed that henceforth, the area will serve mainly as a tourist attraction. On November 6, 2018, it was announced that the UNC would transfer primary guard duties of the now demilitarized Joint Security Area to both North and South Korea.

== Location ==
Map of the current Joint Security Area (JSA) showing the red Military Demarcation Line (MDL) and the buildings; solid black are occupied by North Korea (KPA) and the white are occupied by South Korea (ROK) and the United Nations (UN)

The Joint Security Area is located about 800 meters (1/2 mile) south of the original village of Panmunjom. It is because of this proximity that the terms JSA and Panmunjom are often used interchangeably. The village encompassed a larger area than the current complex of the JSA, and consisted mostly of farms. It was destroyed during the war, and all that now remains on the site of the village is the building constructed for the signing of the Korean Armistice Agreement, now the North Korea Peace Museum. The JSA is administered by the United Nations Command.

== Establishment ==
Among the provisions of the Korean Armistice Agreement signed July 27, 1953, to bring a cease-fire in the Korean War, was establishment of the Military Armistice Commission (MAC), an agency to supervise implementation of the truce terms. Meetings of MAC representatives from the United Nations Command (UNC) and the Korean People's Army/Chinese People's Volunteers (KPA/CPV) were held at the Joint Security Area, an 800-meter (2,600 ft) wide enclave, roughly circular in shape, bisected by the Military Demarcation Line (MDL) separating South and North Korea, and created as a neutral area, where there was free movement of both sides anywhere within the JSA boundaries.

Military Police of both sides provide security for the JSA with guard forces of no more than 35 security personnel on duty at any given time. The administrative facilities for both guard forces are located within the JSA.

== Layout ==
While the boundary has remained the same over the years, the buildings themselves have changed. Some have been removed, including all of the KPA checkpoints on the southern half of the JSA. New buildings have been constructed, whilst some existing buildings have been expanded or simply renovated. The only boundary change of the Joint Security Area was the enforcement of the dividing line within the JSA after the murders of two American officers in 1976. Prior to this, the entire area was neutral, where members of either side possessed the freedom of movement within the JSA.

Since the enforcement of the MDL within the JSA, several UNC checkpoint buildings have also been rebuilt and/or renamed as well. Examples of this are what was called Observation Post (OP) No. 5 on the hill overlooking the Bridge of No Return, is now Checkpoint (CP) #3, while what used to be called CP#3 (and sometimes called "The Loneliest Outpost in the World") was the UNC checkpoint at the southern end of the Bridge of No Return. After the enforcement of the MDL, the North no longer had a road leading into the JSA, and within three days they built what is now known as the "72-Hour Bridge" or "Bridge of 72 Hours".

=== Landmarks ===
==== North ====
- Phanmun Pavilion
- Unification Pavilion

==== South ====
- Freedom House
- Peace House

==== Neutral or Joint ====
- T1 through T3
Major landmarks
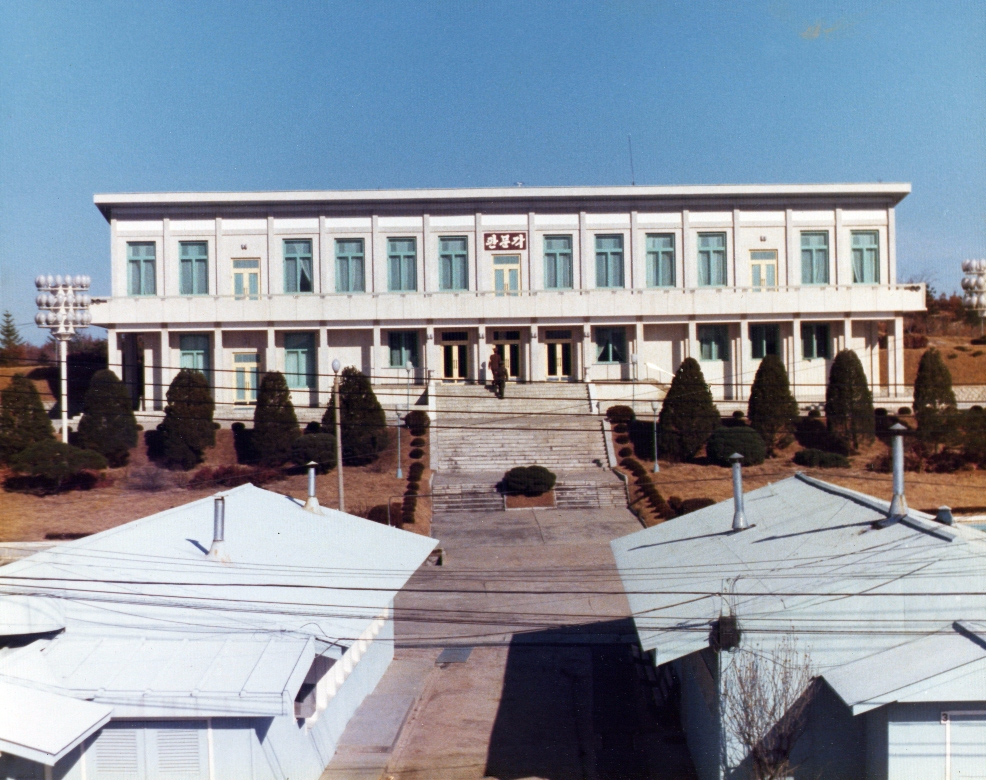
Main North Korean building, Panmungak, from Freedom House Pagoda in 1976

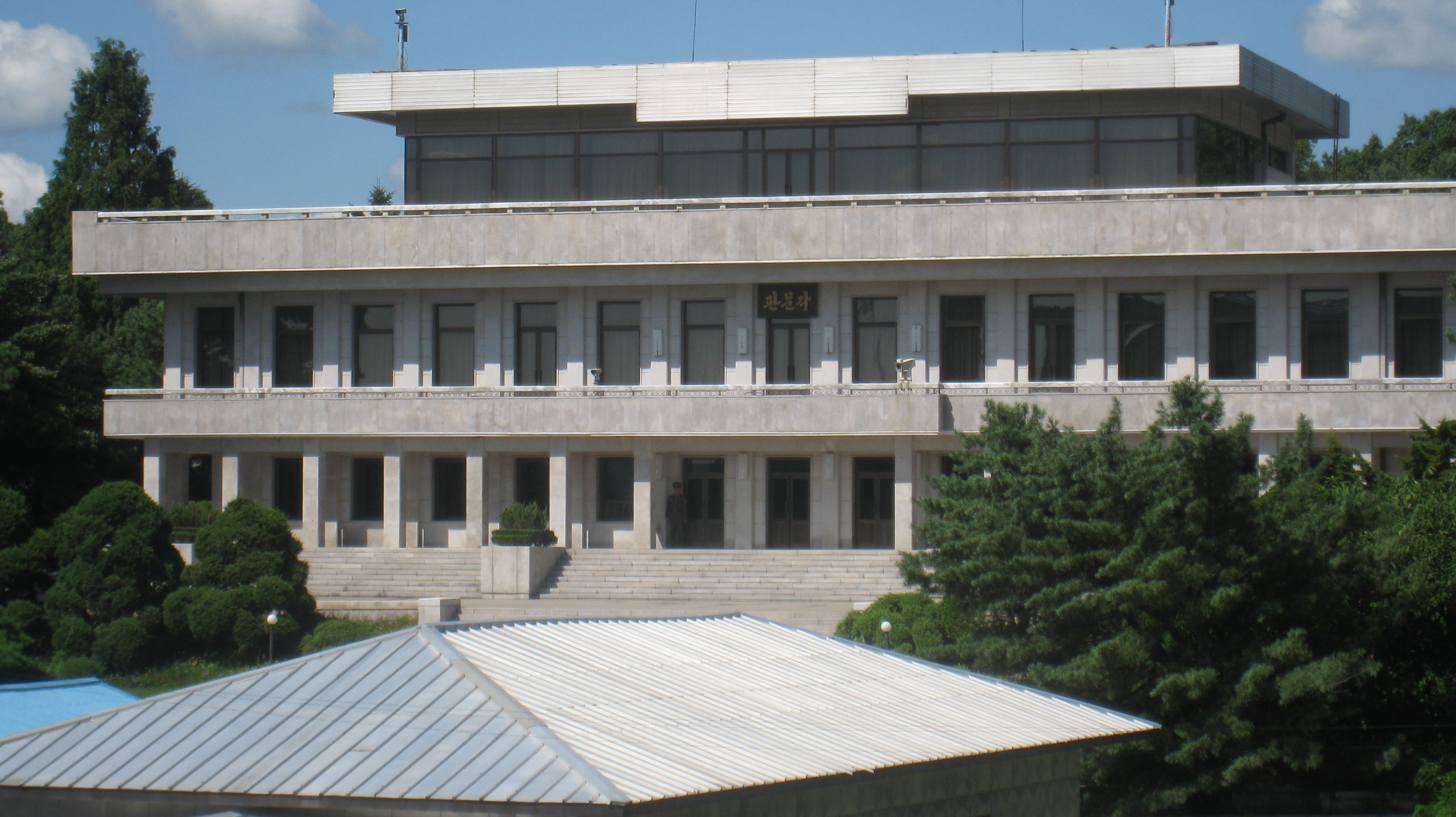
A view of Panmungak, from Freedom House Pagoda in 2009

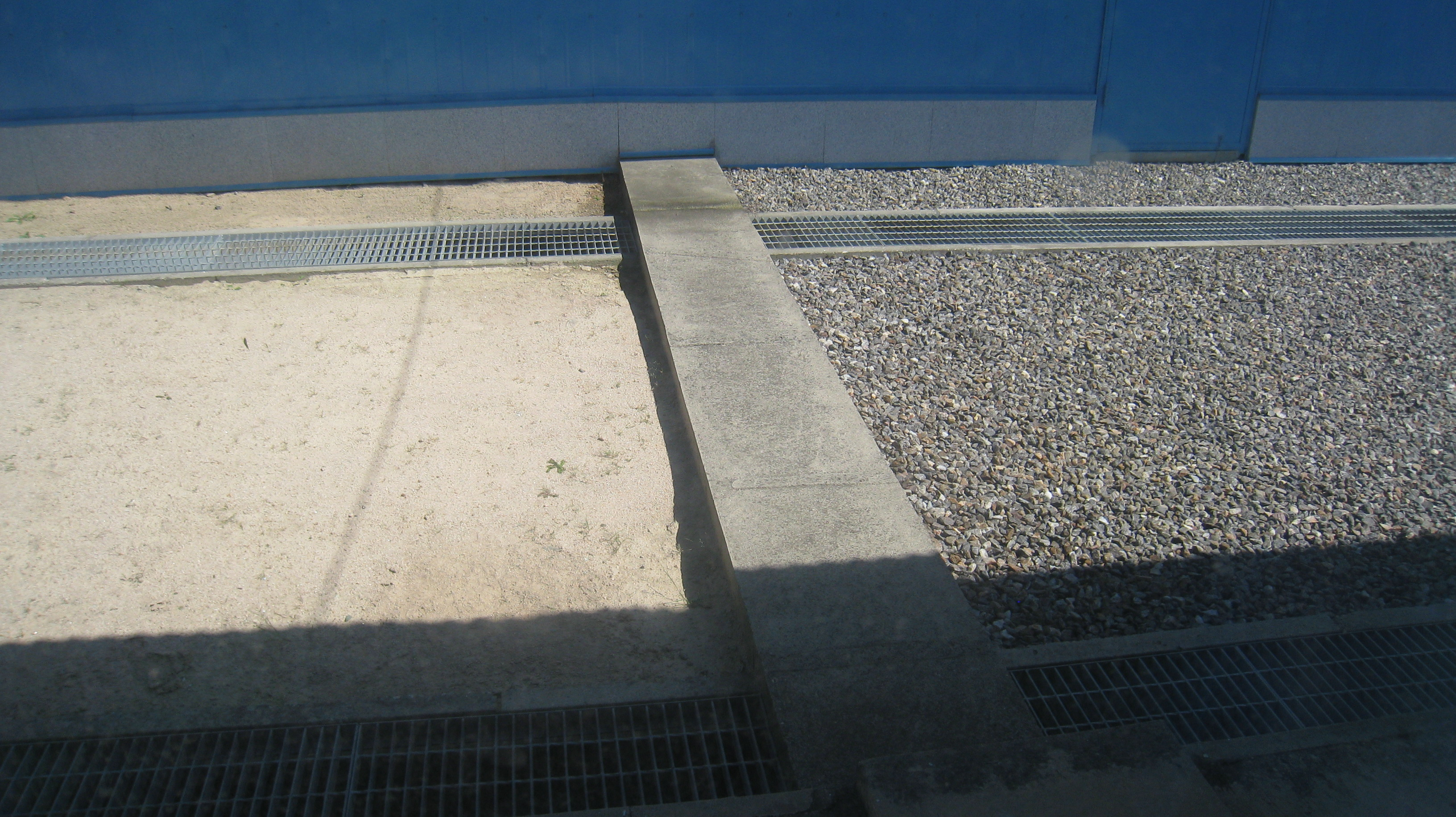
The Military Demarcation Line separating between the North (left) and South (right), marked by a concrete slab between the conference buildings

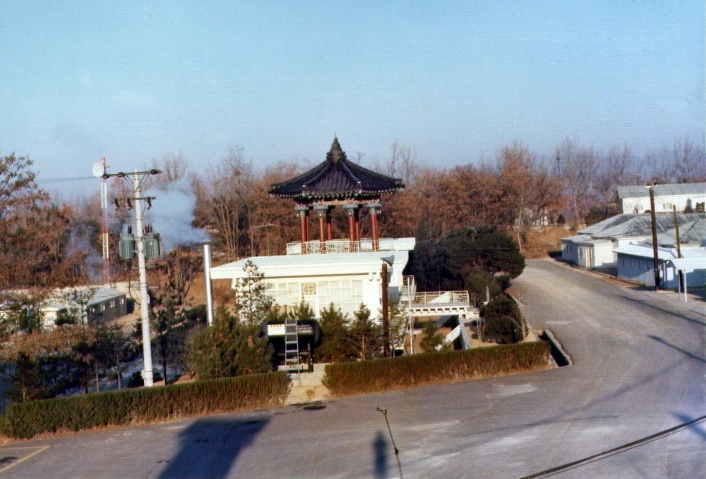
Freedom House and meeting row, from Freedom House Pagoda in 1976

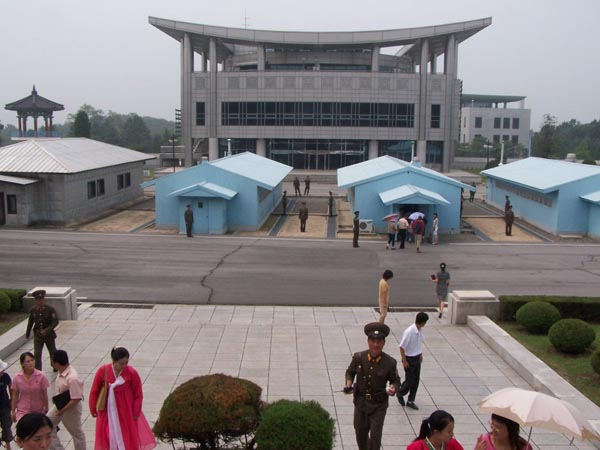
The new Freedom House as viewed from Panmungak in 2005

Panmungak, a two-story building on North Korean side of the JSA built in 1969 and used (1) in one part, for non-military diplomatic meetings, and (2) in another part, for offices for officials in the North Korean military

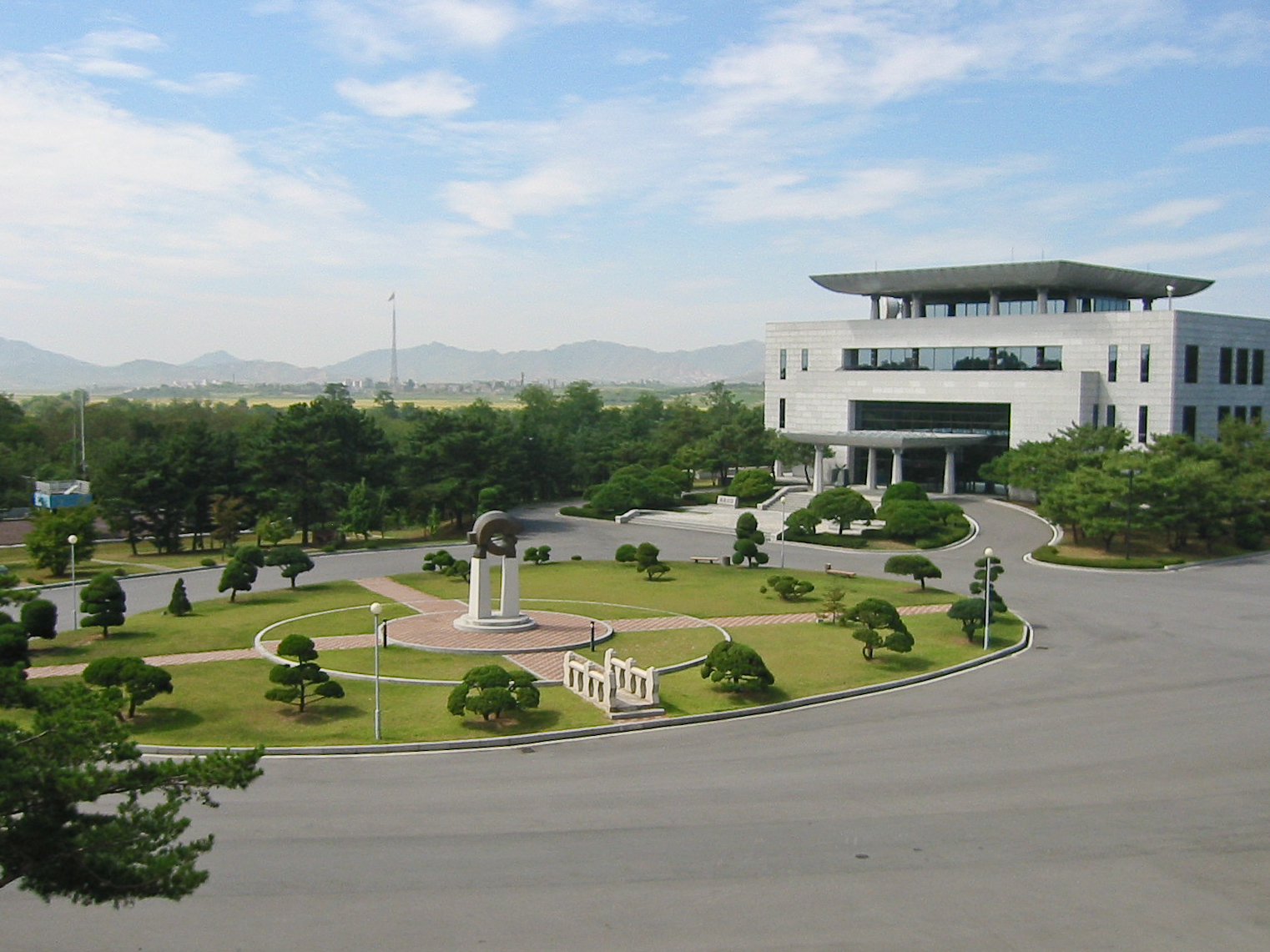
House of Peace, a three-story building on the South Korean side of the JSA built in 1989 used for non-military diplomatic meetings

== United Nations Command staffing ==
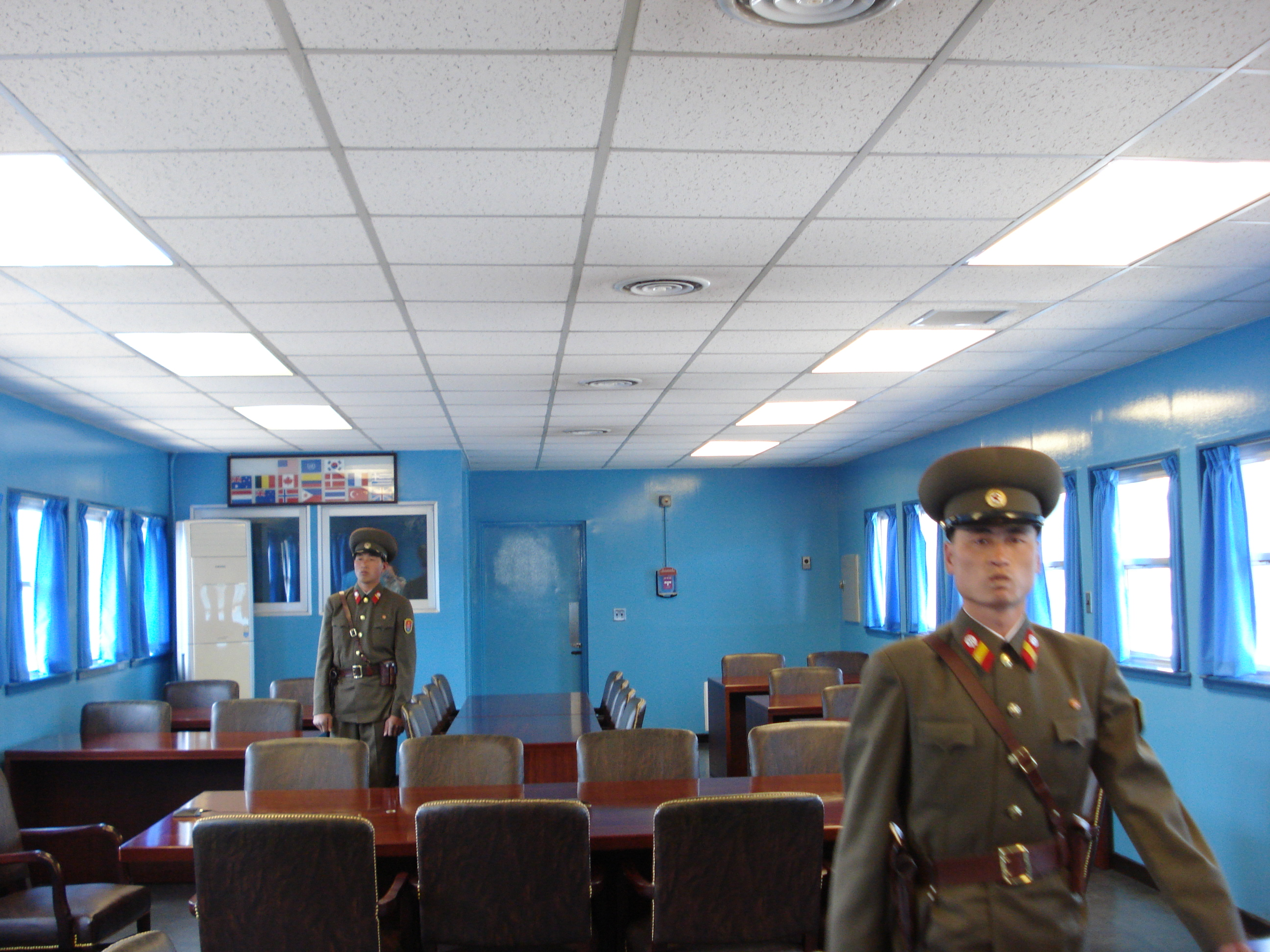
Two KPA soldiers standing guard inside a JSA conference room, in front of the door leading to the South Korean side of the JSA. View from north to south.

The United Nations Command Security Battalion - Joint Security Area (UNCSB-JSA), simply United Nations Command Security Battalion was constituted on May 5, 1952, as Army Unit 8020, United Nations Command Military Armistice Commission Support Group (Provisional). Originally authorized five officers and ten enlisted soldiers, the unit grew to over 1,400 officers and men supporting almost 32,000 soldiers, civilians, and diplomats involved in negotiating and then enforcing the Armistice Agreement. By the end of February 1954 the scope of work declined and the number of soldiers assigned to the unit declined as well.

For the next 50 years, the unit underwent several organizational and name changes, although the original mission to secure the Joint Security Area remains the same today as it was in 1952. On June 11, 1979, the name was changed from US Army Support Group (Joint Security Area) to United Nations Command Support Group—Joint Security Area, and further changed to United Nations Command Security Force—Joint Security Area on December 23, 1985. On October 15, 1994, UNC Commander directed that the unit be known by its present designation, the United Nations Command Security Battalion - Joint Security Area.

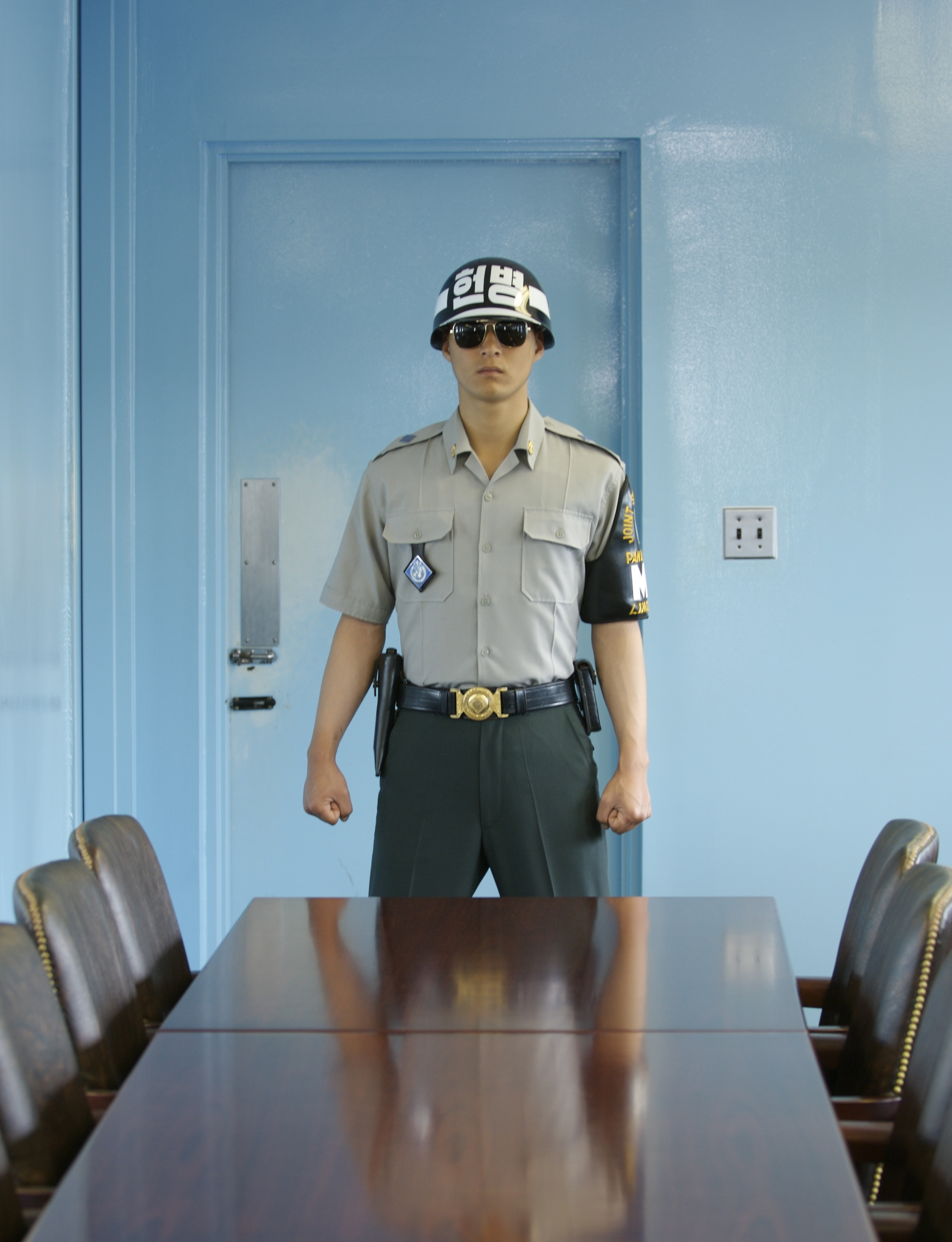
A Republic of Korea soldier of the United Nations Command Security Battalion stands guard inside a JSA conference room, in front of the door leading to the North Korean side of the JSA. View from south to north.

Originally a purely U.S. Army organization, the unit also included ROK soldiers (KATUSAs). In addition, ROK Army officers served as liaison officers. In the mid-1970s the JSA consisted of the JSF company with three platoons of one U.S. and one ROKA officer, and thirty enlisted men, supported by a battalion staff. The three platoons were led by the U.S. officer with the ROK officer as the executive officer, and U.S. Army platoon sergeants. The platoons consisted of three squads, with equal numbers of U.S. and KATUSA soldiers.

Sometime after 1979, another (fourth) platoon was added to the JSF to allow time for training during platoon work rotations. In July 1987 the four platoons of the Joint Security Force (JSF) company were reorganized to mix KATUSA and US soldiers at all levels. At the platoon level, two platoons were led by U.S. Army lieutenants and ROKA platoon sergeants, and two were led by ROKA lieutenants and US Army platoon sergeants. In November 1987 the unit received a ROK Army major as its first deputy commander.

On April 25, 1992, the JSF company became a KATUSA-pure formation. Captain Yin Sung-hwan became the first ROK commander assisted by a U.S. Army lieutenant as his executive officer. The number of U.S. Army personnel assigned to the unit fell below 200 for the first time since 1952. American forces assigned to the JSA assumed mainly administrative and support roles.

On October 31, 2004, a ROK Army battalion assumed sole responsibility for the Joint Security Area. This modified light infantry battalion consisted of a battalion headquarters, a headquarters company, two security companies, and a civil affairs company. The number of U.S. personnel assigned decreased further, reflecting the UNC Commander's desire to minimize the USFK presence near the Korean Demilitarized Zone. The commander of the ROKA JSA Battalion serves as the UNCSB-JSA Deputy Commander. The UNCSB-JSA Commander's principal responsibility now lies in his operational control of selected ROKA formations during both Armistice and wartime periods.

Both sides placed guards between the blue meeting houses, where the demarcation line is marked by blocks of concrete. South Korean guards in this area were armed with pistols and they stood in a modified taekwondo stance with stolid facial expressions, clenched fists and sunglasses, which was meant to intimidate the North Korean guards. The South Korean guards had to be at least 170 cm (5 ft 7 in) tall and have a black belt in taekwondo or judo.

Since October 25, 2018, guards in the Joint Security area no longer have pistols. They are also required to maintain a capacity no larger than 35 people and must be unarmed. Freedom of movement across the border must also be enforced for visitors and tourists at some point as well.

On November 6, 2018, both Koreas and the UNC established new rules which called for, among other things, the transfer of guard duty command to both Koreas for each of their respective sides of the area.

== History and major events ==
=== Overview ===
During one of the initial negotiations of the armistice, agents of the KPA/CPV side went into the truce tents one night and sawed down the chair legs of the UNC delegation. The next day, when the UNC delegates arrived, they were forced to sit lower than their KPA/CPV counterparts and lost face, so they quickly left the meeting. At a later meeting, the UNC delegation brought a flag into the truce tent and set it up on the meeting table. The KPA/CPV delegation left after losing face, but showed up at the next meeting with a flag that was larger than the UNC flag. At the following meeting, the UNC delegation brought in a slightly larger flag. This kept up until a special meeting was called just to discuss the size of the flags, as they had grown too large to fit within the tents. The size of the flags within the meeting building have stayed about the same since then, with only minor changes. The KPA flag is wider than the UNC flag, but the UNC flag is longer. The KPA flag has thicker fringe around the edges of the flag, but the UNC's trim is longer. The truck at the top of the KPA flagpole is taller than the UNC truck, but the UNC's is wider. The KPA flag has a three tiered base while the UNC flag only has two tiers, but each of the tiers on the UNC base is taller than any of the tiers on the KPA flag.

Being at the center of one of the world's most tense military and political fault lines, the Joint Security Area has been the site of numerous interactions between North and South, including over 750 overt acts of violence. The UNC has documented most of the violent incidents with reports and photographs, which have been reported in the course of MAC meetings. Countless fistfights, shouting matches, exchanges of rude gestures, and other provocations have occurred since 1953. There have also been several prisoner exchanges and other interactions.

=== 1950s ===
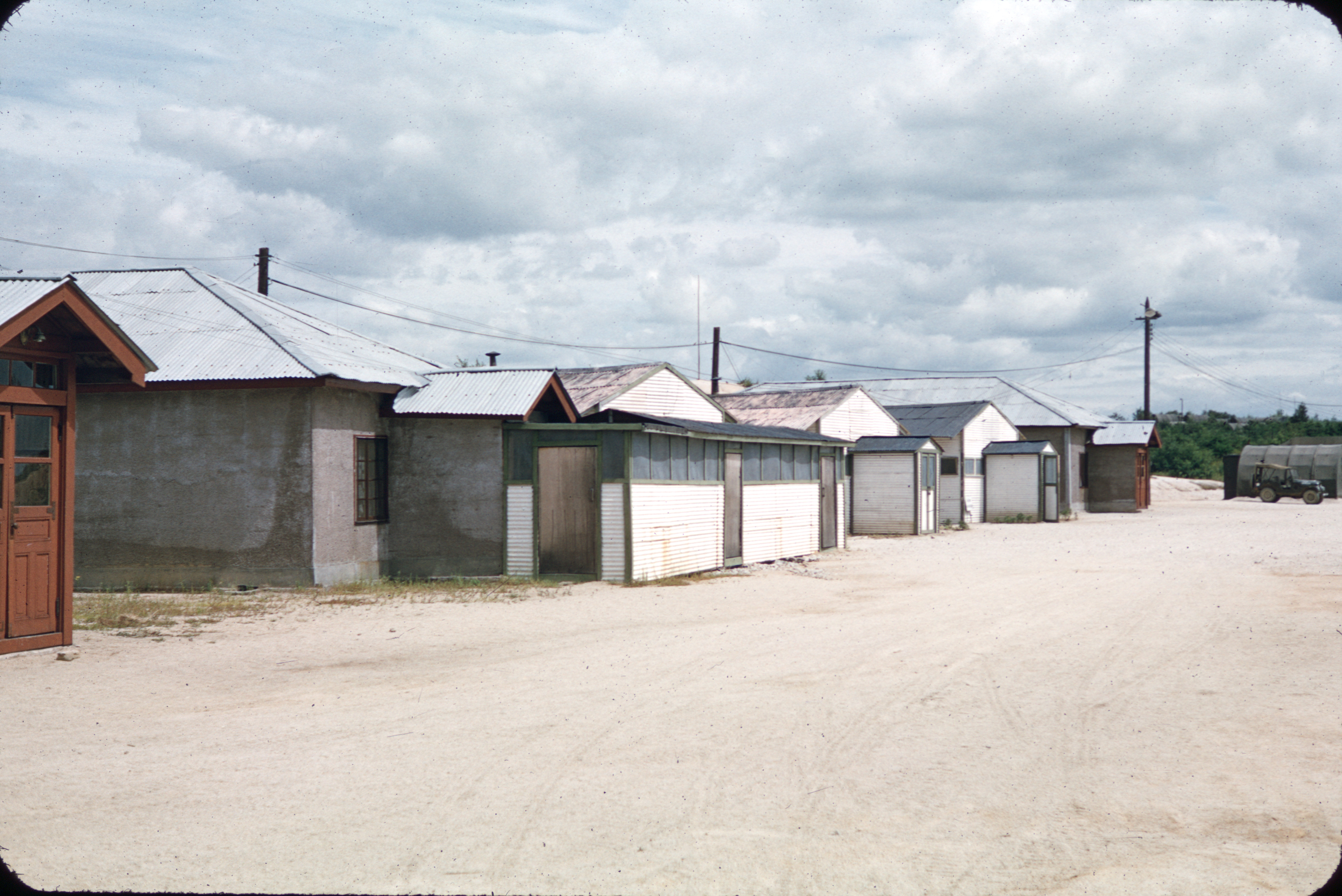
Buildings in the Joint Security Area as they appeared in 1956. View from the south.

- Operation Little Switch, April 1953

This operation was a test case for prisoner repatriation, one of the four main issues of contention during two years of negotiation. 605 sick, wounded, and/or injured UNC prisoners were exchanged for 6,030 sick or injured Communist prisoners.

- Operation Big Switch, April–September 1953

Based on the success of the repatriations undertaken earlier, a general exchange of prisoners began in late April. During Operation Big Switch, prisoners were brought to Panmunjom, on the banks of the Sachong River. Each prisoner was then asked if he wished to cross the river and return to his countrymen or remain with his captors. Once the choice was made there was no turning back—hence the name Bridge of No Return. During this time 13,444 UNC prisoners returned to UNC countries, and 89,493 KPA and CPV prisoners returned to their Communist countries. In June 1953, ROK president Syngman Rhee released a further 25,000 KPA soldiers held in ROKA camps (mostly southerners impressed into service for the north) into South Korea in an attempt to wreck the armistice negotiations.

- Operation Movement of Custodial Forces—India, September 2, 1953,

The Armistice Agreement provided that a nonbelligerent nation would provide security forces to hold any prisoner of war who refused repatriation. India provided 6,413 soldiers for this purpose. After landing at the port of Inchon, the UNCMAC Support Group (Provisional) moved all personnel to the Demilitarized Zone by helicopter in a single day without incident.

- Operation Comeback, January 21, 1954,

Approximately 23,000 KPA and CPV soldiers held in UNC prisoner of war camps refused to return to Communist control. Twenty-two UNC soldiers (21 Americans, one Briton) also refused repatriation. Under the provisions of the Armistice, these soldiers were held for a further six months and interviewed by neutral observers to ensure they had not been coerced into refusing repatriation. Most KPA expatriates remained in South Korea, while the overwhelming majority of CPV expatriates traveled to Taiwan to join the Nationalists.

- Operation Rainbow, March 1954

During this operation the UNCMACSG(P) oversaw the repatriation of displaced persons, expellees, and refugees from North Korea to South Korea across the Military Demarcation Line at Panmunjom.

=== 1960s ===
- On August 29, 1967, at 16:45 (Korean time), KPA soldiers armed with small arms and light machine guns attacked the United States Army Support Group Advance Camp (now known as Camp Bonifas). During this attack two soldiers were killed, and an additional twenty four were wounded. The KPA soldiers were pursued to the MDL by US soldiers from the Advance Camp. Following this incident the southern boundary fence for the DMZ was relocated to a line north of the camp's perimeter.
- On April 14, 1968, at 23:00, KPA soldiers ambushed a UNC truck transporting UNC relief guards to the JSA and Neutral Nations (Swiss/Swede) camp. Using small arms, automatic weapon fire and hand grenades, the KPA soldiers succeeded in stopping the truck and attempted to kill all six soldiers aboard. They withdrew across the MDL after killing four of the soldiers (two US and two ROKA) and wounding the remaining two soldiers.
- Operation Breeches Buoy – On December 23, 1968, Commander Lloyd M. Bucher and his 81 crewmen from USS Pueblo crossed the Bridge of No Return to freedom. They had spent the previous eleven months in captivity after their electronic surveillance ship was attacked and seized by DPRK naval forces on January 22, 1968. Secret negotiations had taken place in the JSA Conference Room during the time of their captivity. They were the last group of UNC personnel to cross the Bridge of No Return.
- Operation Temple Bell – On August 17, 1969, an unarmed OH-23 observation helicopter strayed over DPRK airspace and was forced to land in North Korea. The three crew were held for 108 days during negotiations between Major General A. H. Adam, senior negotiator at the UN Command, and North Korean Major General Lee Choon-sun. In early December 1969 the three crew members were released and ushered over the Bridge of No Return.

=== 1970s ===
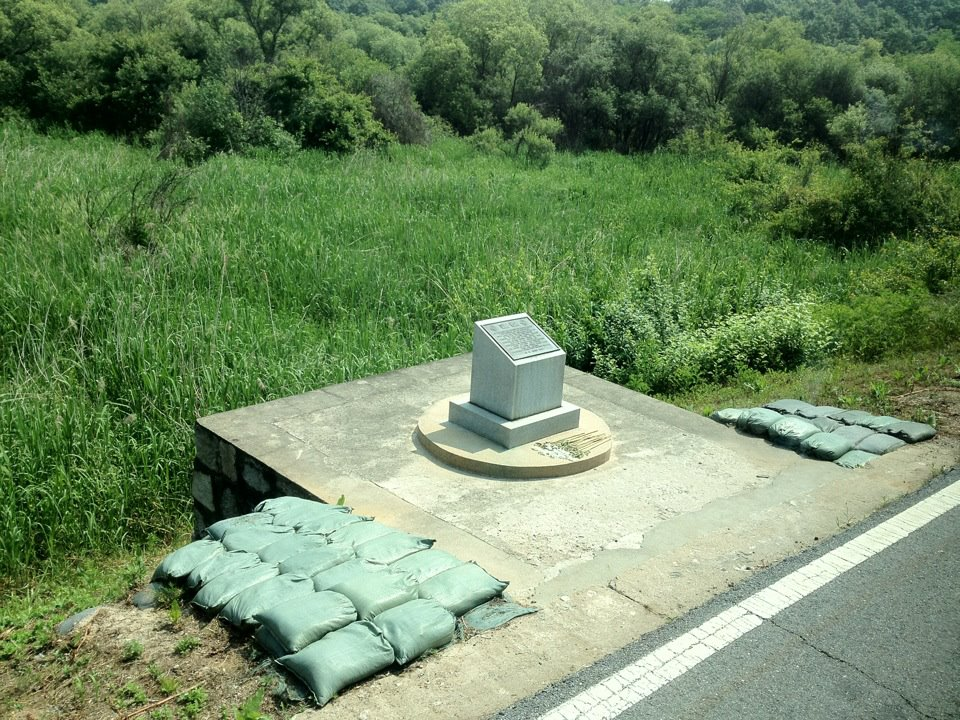
The monument marking the site of the Axe Murder Incident in the Joint Security Area on the border of North and South Korea, as seen in 2012

- Operation Runaway I, February 14, 1970 – A Korean Air Lines aircraft was hijacked by a North Korean agent on December 11, 1969, and forced to divert to Sondŏk Airfield in Wonsan, North Korea. Aside from the hijacker, the plane carried 46 passengers and four crew members. 39 passengers were repatriated through Panmunjom on Valentine's Day, 1970. The remaining passengers and all crew members were held by North Korea and to date have not been permitted to return.
- On October 12, 1970, two KPA guards and one KPA officer approached a group of UNC guards. The KPA soldiers attempted to remove the MP brassard from one UNC guard; a shoving match ensued. The KPA guards disengaged, moved to the KPA Joint Duty Officer building and returned with approximately 30 KPA guards and workers. Armed with shovels, clubs, and rocks, the KPA workers initiated a mêlée. One UNC guard was isolated from the rest, dragged between the MAC and JDO buildings, and beaten on the head with a shovel. Shortly afterward 50 unarmed UNC guards from the UNC JDO building arrived and joined the fray and began isolating and disabling KPA guards on the UNC side of the MDL. Fighting ceased when two KPA guards emerged from a guard post armed with AK-47 rifles. Seven UNC guards suffered injuries, including one with a skull fracture.
- On September 22, 1971, the first hotline between North and South Korea became operational to allow the North and South Korean Red Crosses to negotiate. More direct phone lines were established throughout the 1990s and 2000s until there were 33 hotlines that run through the Panmunjom area.
- On March 3, 1974, a KPA officer and two KPA guards approached a UNC-sponsored tour at UNC Observation Post 5 (now UNCP #3). The UNC escort officer prevented the KPA group from harassing the tour group, at which point the KPA officer grabbed the UNC officer's shoulder. At the same time one of the KPA guards kicked the officer in the back and groin. Approximately 25–30 KPA personnel moved to the site and isolated the UNC officer, preventing him from returning to UNC Check Point 4 until the UNC Quick Reaction Force arrived on scene and dispersed the KPA soldiers. After the UNC QRF departed with the injured officer, KPA guards returned, broke into Check Point 4 and began to vandalize the interior. The QRF redeployed to Check Point 4 and forced the KPA away. The KPA responded by sending approximately 100 additional soldiers to KPA Guard Post No. 7 at the west end of the Bridge of No Return. The UNC JDO arrived on the scene and prevented an escalation by proposing an immediate Security Officers' Meeting. However, upon withdrawing from the area to convene the meeting, the JDO sedan was attacked by the KPA, who broke out the windows with rocks and clubs, injuring the JDO, after which all KPA forces withdrew to their side of the bridge.
- Major Henderson Incident – On June 30, 1975, a North Korean journalist with a history of provocative actions verbally accosted Major W. D. Henderson, the acting commander of the US Army Support Group. When Henderson failed to respond to the verbal insults and rude gestures, the journalist struck him in the face. Rising to protect himself, Henderson was attacked from behind by a KPA guard, who knocked him unconscious and then stomped on his throat, crushing his larynx. UNC and KPA guards from around the JSA immediately responded, and a mêlée ensued. The KPA guards attempted to inflict further injuries on Henderson as he was evacuated. KPA guards also assaulted a UNC-sponsored newswoman, who was hit in the face. The JSF commander arrived on the scene, confronted the fighters, and ended the incident by demanding an immediate Security Officers' Meeting. Henderson was evacuated from the area and eventually transported to the United States for treatment and rehabilitation.
- Korean axe murder incident – On August 18, 1976, North Korean guards attacked a UNC work party which was pruning a large tree obscuring visibility between two UNC checkpoints. During the fight, Joint Security Force (JSF) company commander Captain Bonifas of the US Army was killed by a North Korean guard, and Lieutenant Barrett was killed and most of the UNC guards were wounded by the KPA using axes dropped by the fleeing work party.
- Operation Paul Bunyan, August 21, 1976 – In response to the killing of Bonifas and Barrett by the KPA on August 18, the UNC Commander, General Richard G. Stilwell ordered a massive show of force to accompany the felling of the poplar tree inside the JSA. The tree had been the focal point of the murders.
- In 1977, a U.S. CH-47 helicopter on patrol over the DMZ strayed into North Korean territory and was shot down. The crew—three dead, one alive—were repatriated.

=== 1980s ===
- Soviet defector incident – On November 23, 1984, during a communist-led tour, Soviet citizen Vasily Matuzok (romanized as Matusak in some sources), a translator at the Soviet embassy in Pyongyang, suddenly dashed across the Military Demarcation Line into South Korea. Thirty KPA soldiers pursued him, firing their weapons as they did so. The JSF commanded by Captain Bert Mizusawa deployed from Camp Kitty Hawk (renamed Camp Bonifas in August 1986) to safeguard Matuzok and repel the North Koreans. The KPA soldiers, who were pinned down by fire from the JSF's 4th Platoon on guard duty in Panmunjom, were quickly outmaneuvered and isolated in the area of the Sunken Garden, now the site of the Unification Monument. In the 40-minute firefight that ensued, Corporal Jang Myong-ki was killed, and Private First Class Michael A. Burgoyne was wounded. The JDO NCO negotiated a ceasefire that enabled the North Koreans to withdraw, but not before five of them were wounded and three killed, plus an additional eight captured. It has been rumored that Lt. Pak Chul ("Lt. Bulldog", who commanded North Korean soldiers in the confrontation that led to the Axe murder incident a decade earlier) was one of those killed in this firefight, though documentation has not been found yet. However, he has not been seen in the JSA since this incident. Additionally, there were gunshots in the north approximately 20 minutes after the cease fire was effective, and it was reported by senior members of the Neutral Nations Supervisory Commission to the JSF commander that the KPA commander and one of his key subordinates were summarily executed. The KPA commander was likewise never seen again, however no evidence is adduced for these claims. Matuzok was given a short debriefing in Seoul, then turned over to the UN High Commissioner for Refugees, which made arrangements for him to be resettled in the U.S. under the sponsorship of the International Rescue Committee, an organization that helps to resettle refugees in Western countries.
- Chinese Joint Duty Officer defection – On July 29, 1989, a Chinese army officer and his wife defected to South Korea. Major Zuo Xiukai and his wife crossed the demarcation line from North Korea at Panmunjom. This was the first Chinese officer to defect to South Korea through Panmunjom since the Korean War.

=== 1990s ===
- KPA Abandonment of the MAC Meetings, March 1991

In March 1991, the UNC commander appointed a South Korean General as chief representative. As North Korea claims that only signatories to the Armistice Agreement, of which South Korea is not a part, can be representatives, they refuse to attend any more MAC meetings.

- Operation Popeye, February 1, 1994

In January 1994 two KPA soldiers were swept into the East China Sea. They were rescued by elements of the ROK Navy. Neither soldier wished to defect, so they were returned to North Korean control through Panmunjom.

- Operation Bobby Hall, December 29, 1994

In December 1994 an unarmed OH-58 Kiowa helicopter from the US Army crossed the MDL while undertaking a low-altitude flight over hilly, wooded terrain in South Korea. KPA air defense forces shot the aircraft down as it was returning to South Korean-controlled territory. Co-pilot David M. Hilemon was killed but pilot Bobby Hall was released 13 days later after signing an apology for "accidentally straying" into North Korean airspace.

=== 2010s ===
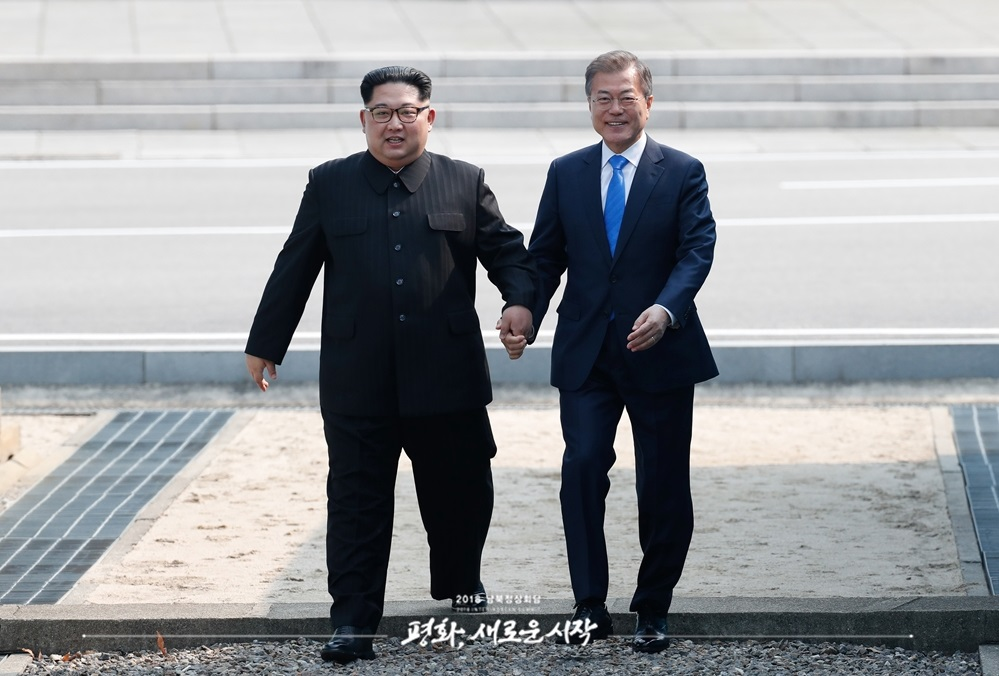
South Korean President Moon Jae-in and North Korean leader Kim Jong-un met at the Joint Security Area on April 27, 2018.

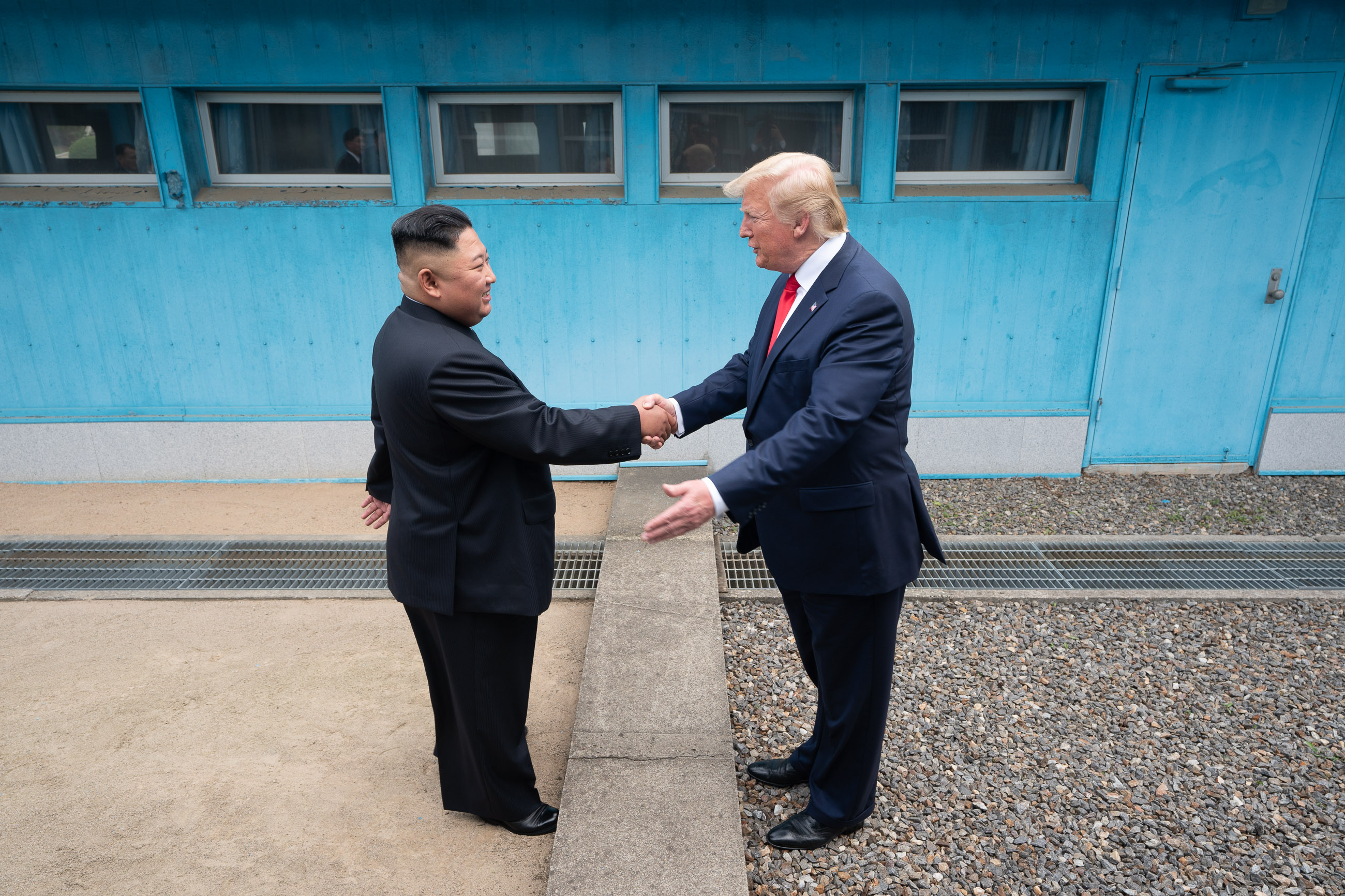
U.S. President Donald Trump and leader of North Korea Kim Jong-un briefly met at the Joint Security Area on June 30, 2019.

- In August 2010, Reverend Han Sang-ryol of South Korea, who had entered and stayed in North Korea for two months in order to promote his cause of Korean unification, was arrested by South Korean authorities after returning to South Korea through the Joint Security Area.
- In March 2012, South Korean unification activist Ro Su-hui entered North Korea in order to promote his cause of Korean unification. In July, he was arrested by South Korean authorities, after returning to South Korea through the Joint Security Area.
- In June 2013, initial talks to prepare for higher-level negotiations were held in the JSA. These were the first working-level talks held in the JSA since February 2011. No ministerial-level talks have been held at the JSA since 2007.
- In November 2017, Oh Chong-song, a North Korean soldier, defected by crossing the demarcation line in the JSA. The soldier drove a vehicle until it became stuck on the north side of the border. The defector then jumped out and was shot by other KPA soldiers and was found in critical condition with multiple gun wounds about 50 m (55 yards) from the demarcation line. He survived.
- In January 2018, North Korea and South Korea met on the South Korean side of the JSA at the Inter-Korean Peace House to discuss North Korea's participation in the 2018 Winter Olympics including a possible inter-Korean women's ice hockey team and North Korea's participation in ice skating pairs.
- On April 27, 2018, the 2018 inter-Korean summit took place. North Korean leader Kim Jong-un shook hands with South Korean President Moon Jae-in and crossed over the MDL, marking the first time a North Korean leader has set foot in Southern territory since the Korean War ended in 1953. Both men held hands and crossed back over to the North briefly before returning to the South.
- On May 26, 2018, Kim and Moon met again in the JSA, this time on the North Korean side of Panmunjom. The meeting took two hours, and unlike other summits it had not been publicly announced beforehand.
- On September 19, 2018, Kim and Moon signed an agreement in Pyongyang calling for the removal of landmines, guard posts, weapons, and personnel in the JSA. The Koreas also agree to turn the area into a "peace tourism" zone once the withdrawal has been complete. In South Korea, the Ministry of Culture, Sports and Tourism and the Korea Tourism Organization signed an agreement with 13 local governments to establish a committee ensuring the transfer of control of the Joint Security Area
- On October 1, 2018, a process had begun to remove landmines from the JSA.
- On October 16, 2018, both Koreas agreed to allow tourists to walk across the JSA's MDL in a way which reenacts Kim and Moon's April 27, 2018 border crossing. This agreement came following a meeting the UN Command military officers from both North and South Korea in the South Korean side of Panmunjom.
- On October 19, 2018, the UNC announced that both Koreas had completed their work to remove landmines from the JSA.
- On October 22, 2018, the UNC endorsed the decision to remove guard posts and weapons from both sides of the Korean border and agreed to provide assistance in the removal process.
- On October 25, 2018, guard posts and weapons were removed from the JSA. Personnel also withdrew from the JSA by 1 pm. The area is now occupied by 35 unarmed UNC personnel, and 35 unarmed KPA personnel, for a total of 70.
- On November 6, 2018, both Koreas and the UNC established a new set of rules which included, among other things, the transfers of security oversight. Both North and South Korea will now have oversight over security personnel stationed at their respective sides of the JSA.
- On June 30, 2019, United States President Donald Trump visited the demilitarized zone with South Korean President Moon Jae-in. Trump then separately met with North Korean leader Kim Jong-un. Trump stepped briefly across the MDL onto the northern side becoming the first sitting U.S. president to have set foot into North Korea (two former Presidents, Jimmy Carter and Bill Clinton, visited North Korea long after leaving office).

=== 2020s ===
- On July 18, 2023, Travis King, a US Army Private, left his tour group and crossed the demarcation line into North Korea without authorization. He was taken into North Korean custody and released on September 27, 2023, back to U.S. authorities.

== Tourism ==
The JSA currently has around 100,000 tourists visit each year through several tourism companies and the USO (through the various U.S. military commands in Korea). Before being allowed to enter the DMZ, if visiting from the South, tourists are given a briefing during which they must sign a document which states, in part, "The visit to the Joint Security Area at Panmunjom will entail entry into a hostile area and possibility of injury or death as a direct result of enemy action." During a meeting held between the UN command and military officers from North and South Korea on the South Korean side of Panmunjom on October 16, 2018, it was agreed that when the JSA disarmament is complete, civilian and foreign tourists will be allowed to visit the border area from 9 a.m. to 5 p.m. without restrictions about what they can wear. It was agreed that at this point, the MDL which runs through the JSA will be open to local and foreign tourists so they can reenact Kim and Moon's crossing which occurred on April 27, 2018. This withdrawal was complete on October 25, though tourism has been delayed. No date was set for the resumption of JSA tourism when rules were established for the transfer of guard duty command on November 6, 2018, as well.

== See also ==
- Daeseong-dong – a village on the south side of the demarcation line
- Kijŏng-dong – a village on the north side of the demarcation line
