= 72-Hour Bridge =

Bridge in North Korea

- Coordinates: 37°57′34″N 126°40′14″E
- Crosses: Sach'ŏn River
- Locale: North Korean side of the Joint Security Area, Panmunjom
- Official name: Panmunjom Bridge
- Other name: Bridge of 72 Hours
- Named for: Being built in 72 hours

Characteristics
- Material: Asphalt
- Total length: 150 meters (490 ft)
- No. of lanes: 2

History
- Built: August 1976
- Replaces: Bridge of No Return

Korean name
- Hangul: 72시간 다리
- RR: 72sigan dari
- MR: 72sigan tari

Location
- Interactive map of 72-Hour Bridge

A map of the Joint Security Area

The 72-Hour Bridge (Korean: 72시간 다리) or Bridge of 72 Hours, known as the Panmunjom Bridge by the Korean People's Army, is a bridge in Panmunjom that crosses the Sach'ŏn River and connects the Joint Security Area (JSA) to North Korea. The bridge was built in August 1976 in the span of 72 hours after the Korean axe murder incident closed the Bridge of No Return that North Korea originally used to access the JSA.

== Background ==
When the Joint Security Area (JSA) was established in Panmunjom after the end of the Korean War, the Bridge of No Return crossing the Sach'ŏn River was the only bridge that connected North Korea to the JSA. The bridge is divided in half by the Military Demarcation Line (MDL) and was used to conduct prisoner swaps. At the time, the JSA was a neutral zone and both North Korean, South Korean, and United States soldiers were allowed to cross the MDL within the JSA.

== History ==
In August 1976, U.S. and South Korean soldiers attempted to trim a tree within the JSA that was obscuring the view of the North Korean checkpoint on the other side of the Bridge of No Return. On 18 August, U.S. soldiers were trimming the tree when North Korean soldiers arrived and demanded that the U.S. soldiers not trim the tree. When the U.S. soldiers refused, the North Koreans attacked them with axes, killing two Americans.

After the axe murder incident, the MDL was enforced within the JSA and North Koreans were unable to access the JSA via the Bridge of No Return as it was closed. To regain access to the JSA, North Korea constructed a bridge crossing the Sach'ŏn River on their side of the MDL in a 72 hours time span. The Korean People's Army named the bridge the "Panmunjom Bridge" but it is nicknamed the "72-Hour Bridge" as it was built within 72 hours. The 72-Hour Bridge has since been North Korea's access point to the JSA. The bridge is 150 meters (490 ft) long, is surfaced with asphalt, and carries two lanes.

On 13 November 2017 a North Korean sergeant, Oh Chong-song, drove a vehicle across the 72-Hour Bridge and into the JSA while defecting to South Korea. After Oh's defection, North Korea installed a mechanical gate on the 72-Hour Bridge to prevent future defections through the JSA.

== See also ==
- List of bridges in North Korea
