= List of tunnels in North Korea =

This page is a list of tunnels in North Korea.

== Rail ==
=== Mass transit ===
- Chollima Line
- Hyoksin Line

=== Korean State Railway ===
- Saenggiryong Railway Tunnel

== Road ==
=== Pyongyang–Wonsan Tourist Motorway ===
Tunnels from Pyongyang to Wonsan in order:

English name	Korean name	Length (굴길이)	Complete	Notes
Suan tunnel	수안굴	300m?	9 September 1978	
Kyŏngsu tunnel	경수굴	107m?	9 September 1978	
Kwanmun tunnel	관문굴	306m?	9 September 1978	
Kumsudong tunnel	금수동굴	477m?	9 September 1978	
Sinphyŏng tunnel	신평굴	283m?	9 September 1978	Missing from the video.
Munbawi tunnel	문바위굴	62.5m?	9 September 1978	
Ŭndŏk tunnel	은덕굴	85m	9 September 1978	
Sogwang tunnel	서광굴	49m	9 September 1978	
Kwangmyŏng tunnel	광명굴	194m	9 September 1978	
Ryomyong tunnel	려명굴	44m	9 September 1978	
Mannyŏn tunnel	만년굴	212m	9 September 1978	
Ponghwa tunnel	봉화굴	40m	9 September 1978	
Sol Jaeryŏng tunnel	솔재령굴		9 September 1978	
Pŏptong tunnel	법동굴	253m?	9 September 1978	
Chungsŏng tunnel	충성굴	1229m?	9 September 1978	
Sangryŏng tunnel	상령굴	671m?	9 September 1978	
Kamdun tunnel	감둔굴	310m?	9 September 1978	
Majŏn tunnel	마전굴		9 September 1978	
Tochan tunnel	도찬굴	482m?	9 September 1978	
Mujigae (Rainbow) tunnel	무지개동굴	4135m?	9 September 1978	

=== Pyongyang-Kaesong Motorway ===
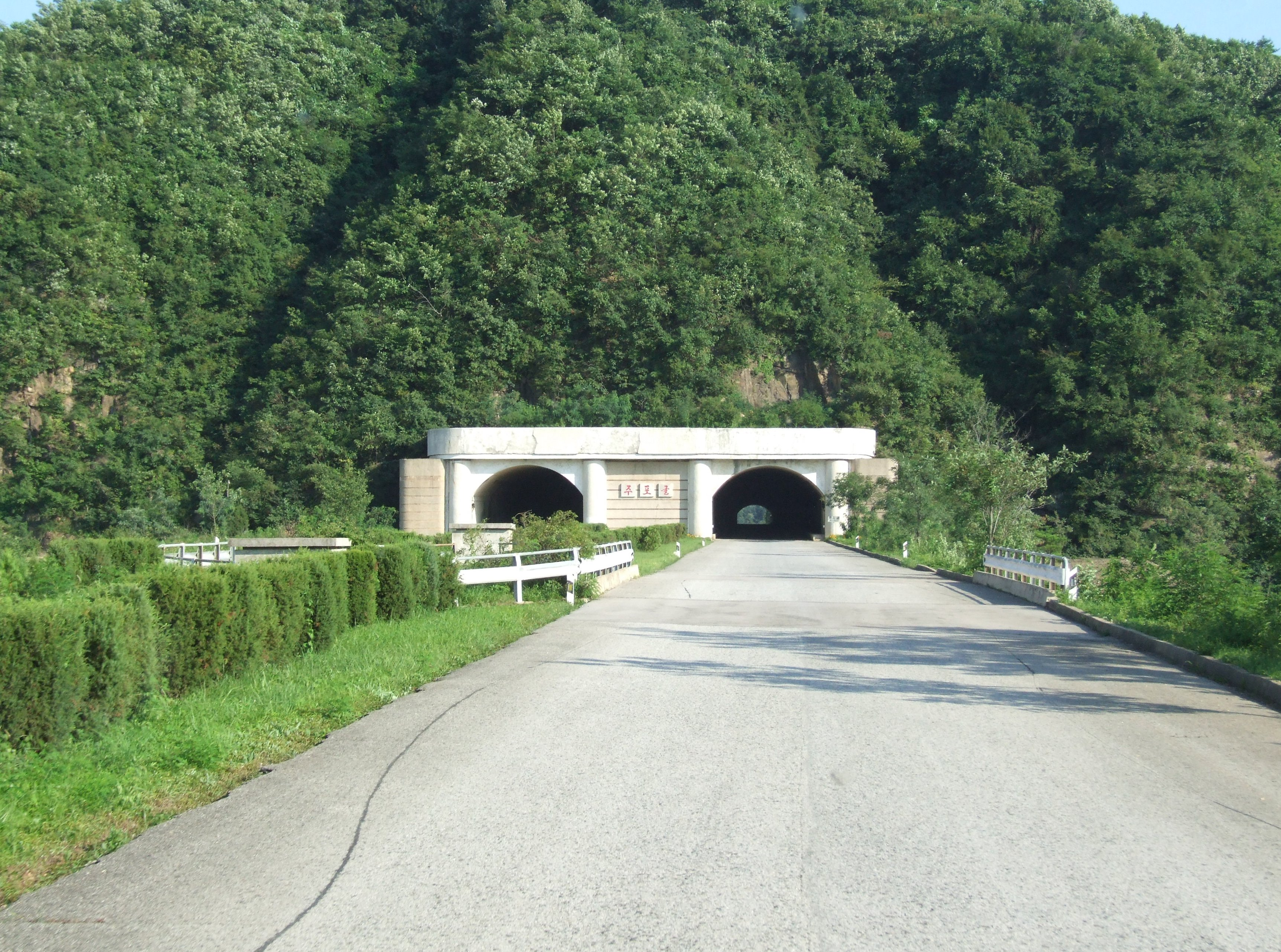
The Jupo tunnel on the Pyongyang-Kaesong Motorway

Tunnels from Pyongyang to Kaesong, in order:

English name	Korean name	Length	Notes
Jangchŏn tunnel	장천굴		
Taedong tunnel	대동굴		
?			
?			
Kachang tunnel	가창굴	305m	
Yangam tunnel	양암굴		
Chunghol tunnel	충홀굴		
Sŏbong tunnel	서봉굴	306m	
Mŭlam tunnel	믈암굴	300m	
Samryong tunnel	삼룡굴		Same name as a nearby town.
Puhŭng tunnel	부흥굴		
Jupo tunnel	주포굴		
Ryonggung tunnel	룡궁굴		Likely name and location based on a nearby town.
Okchŏn tunnel	옥천굴		
Ryesŏng tunnel	례성굴		
Kyeryŏng tunnel	계령굴		
Samgŏ tunnel	삼거굴		
Hongil tunnel	홍일굴	345m	

=== Pyongyang–Huichon Motorway ===
There are two tunnels near Kaechon.

- The eastern tunnel is the 2nd Sŏhwa tunnel (서화2굴), whose length is 417m.
- The western tunnel is therefore perhaps the 1st Sŏhwa tunnel (서화1굴).

=== Pyongyang–Kangdong Motorway ===
- There is a tunnel and depressed section of the road in Songmun.
- An unused tunnel under the Taedong river, being bypassed by the Taedong River Bridge.

=== Pyongyang ===
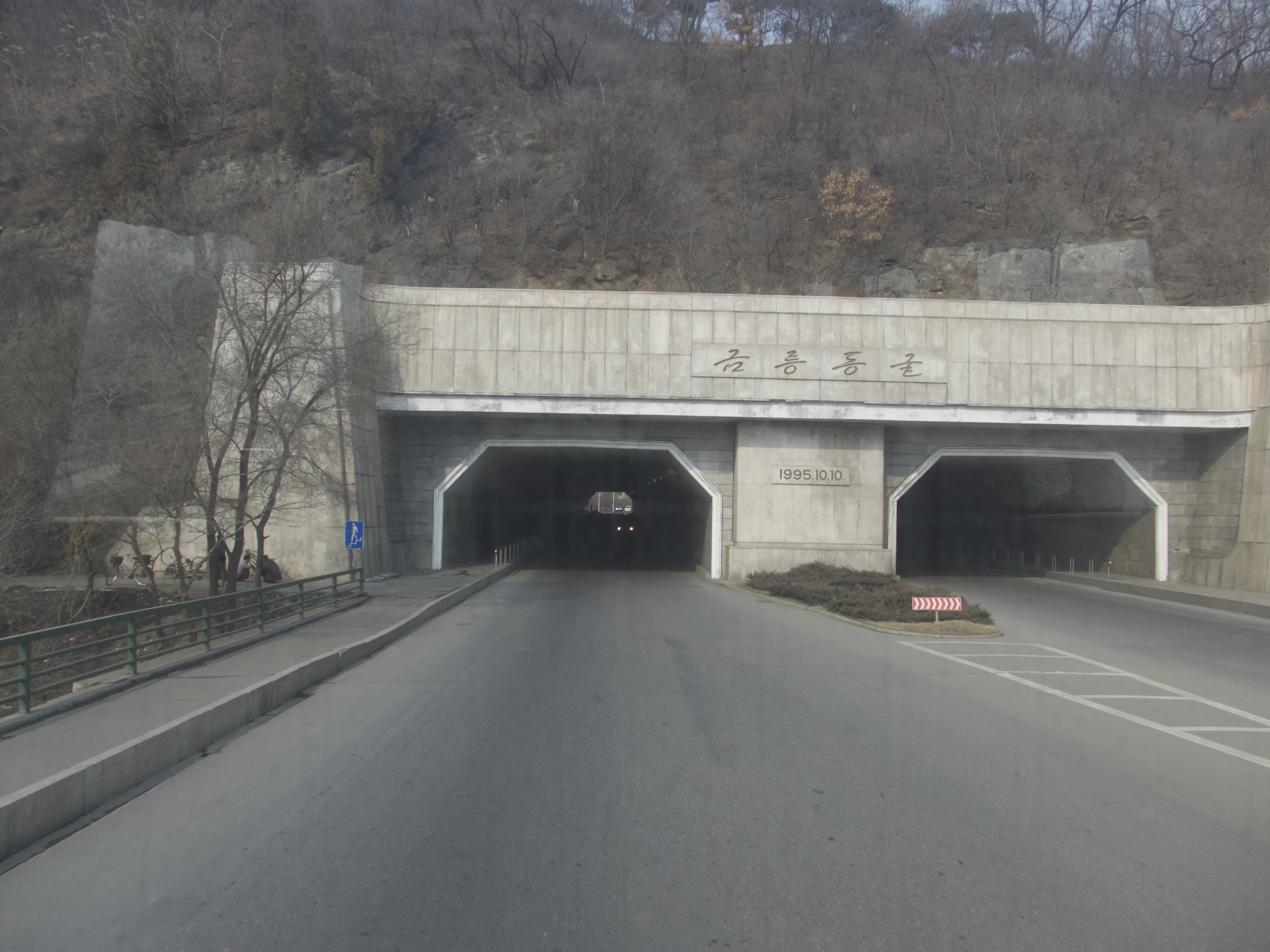
The Chongryu Bridge Geumneung tunnel in Pyongyang, North Korea

There are three Geumneung tunnels, one on the Chongryu Bridge, one on the Rungra Bridge, and one by the Kumsusan Palace of the Sun.

- 금릉동굴/금릉1호동굴 Rungra Bridge Geumneung tunnel with eastern and western portals.
- 금릉동굴/금릉2호동굴 Chongryu Bridge Geumneung tunnel
- 금릉동굴 Kumsusan Palace Geumneung tunnel
- 마람굴 Maram tunnel (road to Pyongsong)

== Incursion tunnels to South Korea ==
Image	English name	Korean name	Discovered	Notes
	First Infiltration Tunnel	제1땅굴	20 November 1974	
	Second Infiltration Tunnel	제2땅굴	19 March 1975	
	Third Tunnel of Aggression	제3땅굴	17 October 1978	
	Fourth Infiltration Tunnel	第4땅굴	3 March 1990	

== See also ==
- List of tunnels by location
- List of bridges in North Korea
