= Major Henderson incident =

1975 assault of U.S. Army officer by North Koreans

The Major Henderson incident (헨더슨 소령 사건) occurred on June 30, 1975. A dozen North Korean guards and reporters assaulted US Army Major W. D. Henderson, a United Nations Command (UNC) security officer in the Joint Security Area (JSA), injuring him seriously. Henderson was trampled on by the North Koreans and suffered a fractured larynx before he was rescued by United Nations Command guards.

As Henderson was sitting on a bench located outside of T2, the UNC Joint Duty Officer office, a North Korean journalist known for instigating fights approached Henderson and ordered him to move out of his way. When Henderson did not comply, the reporter spat on him. Henderson stood up and the North Korean reporter struck him. Henderson returned the punch. Several North Korean guards then attacked Henderson, dragged him to the ground and began beating and kicking him. Henderson suffered a crushed larynx and was medically evacuated by helicopter.

Henderson survived, continued his career, and later retired from the United States Army.

== See also ==
- Korean axe murder incident the following year
