= Camp Bonifas =

United Nations military post in Korea

Coordinates: 37°55′59″N 126°43′30″E

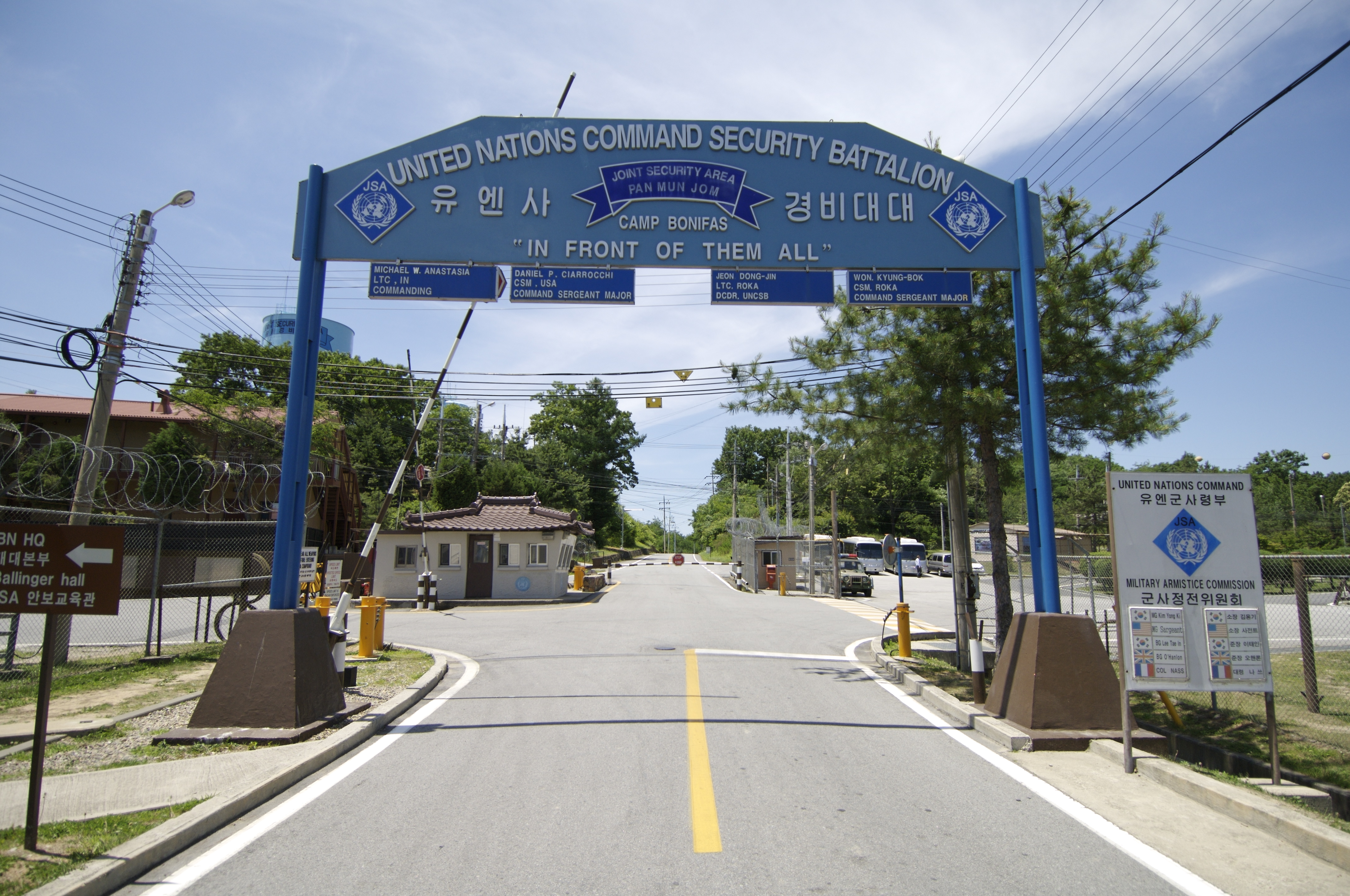
Korean Demilitarized Zone. Camp Bonifas main gate. View from south looking north.

Camp Bonifas is a United Nations Command military post located 400 m (1,300 ft) south of the southern boundary of the Korean Demilitarized Zone (DMZ). It is 2,400 m (7,900 ft) south of the Military Demarcation Line, which forms the border between South Korea (the Republic of Korea) and North Korea (the Democratic People's Republic of Korea). It was returned to the Republic of Korea in 2006.

== Overview ==
Camp Bonifas is home to the United Nations Command Security Battalion-Joint Security Area (JSA), whose primary mission is to monitor and enforce the Korean Armistice Agreement of 1953 between North and South Korea. Republic of Korea and United States Forces Korea soldiers (known as "security escorts") conduct the United Nations Command DMZ Orientation Program tours of the JSA and surrounding areas. The camp has a gift shop which sells DMZ- and JSA-related souvenirs.

The camp, formerly known as Camp Kitty Hawk, was renamed on August 18, 1986, in honor of U.S. Army Captain Arthur G. Bonifas (posthumously promoted to major), who along with First Lieutenant Mark T. Barrett (posthumously promoted to captain), were killed by North Korean soldiers in the "Korean axe murder incident".

Access to the Neutral Nations Monitors (Sweden and Switzerland), on Camp Swiss-Swede, was through Camp Bonifas.

There is a par 3 one-hole "golf course" at the camp which includes an AstroTurf green and is surrounded on three sides by minefields. Sports Illustrated called it "the most dangerous hole in golf" and there are reports that at least one shot detonated a land mine.

Kevin Sullivan of The Washington Post reported in 1998 that Camp Bonifas was a "small collection of buildings surrounded by triple coils of razor wire just 440 yards south of the DMZ" that, were it not for the minefields and soldiers, would "look like a big Boy Scout camp".

== See also ==
- Joint Security Area
- List of United States Army installations in South Korea
