= Korean Demilitarized Zone =

North-South Korean border barrier

Coordinates: 38.32°N 127.20°E

- 한반도/조선반도 비무장 지대
- Korean Peninsula
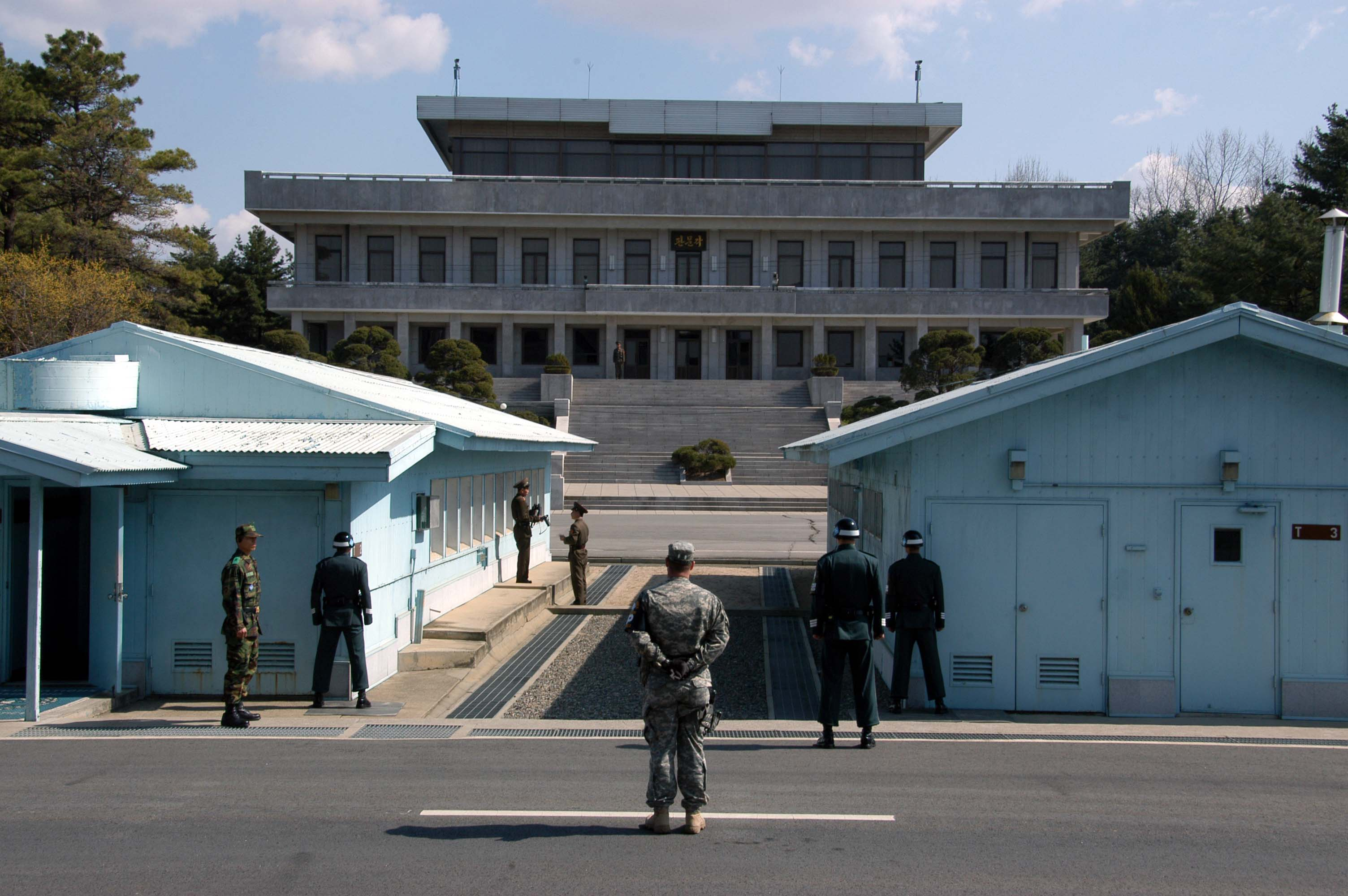
- View of the North from the southern side of the Joint Security Area

Site information
- Type: DMZ
- Open to the public: Access granted by North Korea or United Nations Command
- Condition: Fully manned and operational

Location
- The Korean DMZ is denoted by the red highlighted area. The blue line indicates the international border. The four incursion tunnels are also shown.
- Length: 238 km (148 mi)

Site history
- Built by: China; United States; North Korea; South Korea; United Nations Command
- In use: Since 27 July 1953 (73 years ago)
- Events: Division of Korea

South Korean name
- Hangul: 한반도 비무장 지대
- Hanja: 韓半島 非武裝 地帶
Transcriptions
- Revised Romanization: Hanbando bimujang jidae
- McCune–Reischauer: Hanbando pimujang chidae

North Korean name
- Chosŏn'gŭl: 조선반도 비무장지대
- Hancha: 朝鮮半島 非武裝地帶
Transcriptions
- Revised Romanization: joseonbando bimujang jidae
- McCune–Reischauer: chosŏnbando pimujang chidae

The Korean Demilitarized Zone (Korean: 한반도/조선반도 비무장 지대), also known as the Korean DMZ, KDMZ, or simply the DMZ, is a strip of land running across the Korean Peninsula which intersects the 38th parallel north. The DMZ is a border barrier that divides the peninsula roughly in half. It was established to serve as a demilitarized zone between the sovereign states of the Democratic People's Republic of Korea (North Korea) and the Republic of Korea (South Korea) under the provisions of the Korean Armistice Agreement in 1953, an agreement between North Korea, China, and the United Nations Command.

The DMZ is 250 kilometers (160 mi) long and about 4 kilometers (2.5 mi) wide (2 kilometers on either side of the Military demarcation line - MDL. On either side of the zone the border is heavily militarized. The zone is a frontline in the ongoing Korean conflict. There have been various incidents in and around the DMZ, with military and civilian casualties on both sides. Within the DMZ is a meeting point between the two Korean states, where negotiations take place: the small Joint Security Area (JSA) near the western end of the zone, not far from the South Korean capital Seoul. The DMZ's heavy security, particularly from the North Koreans, serves as a barrier against North Korean citizens trying to defect to South Korea.

== Location ==
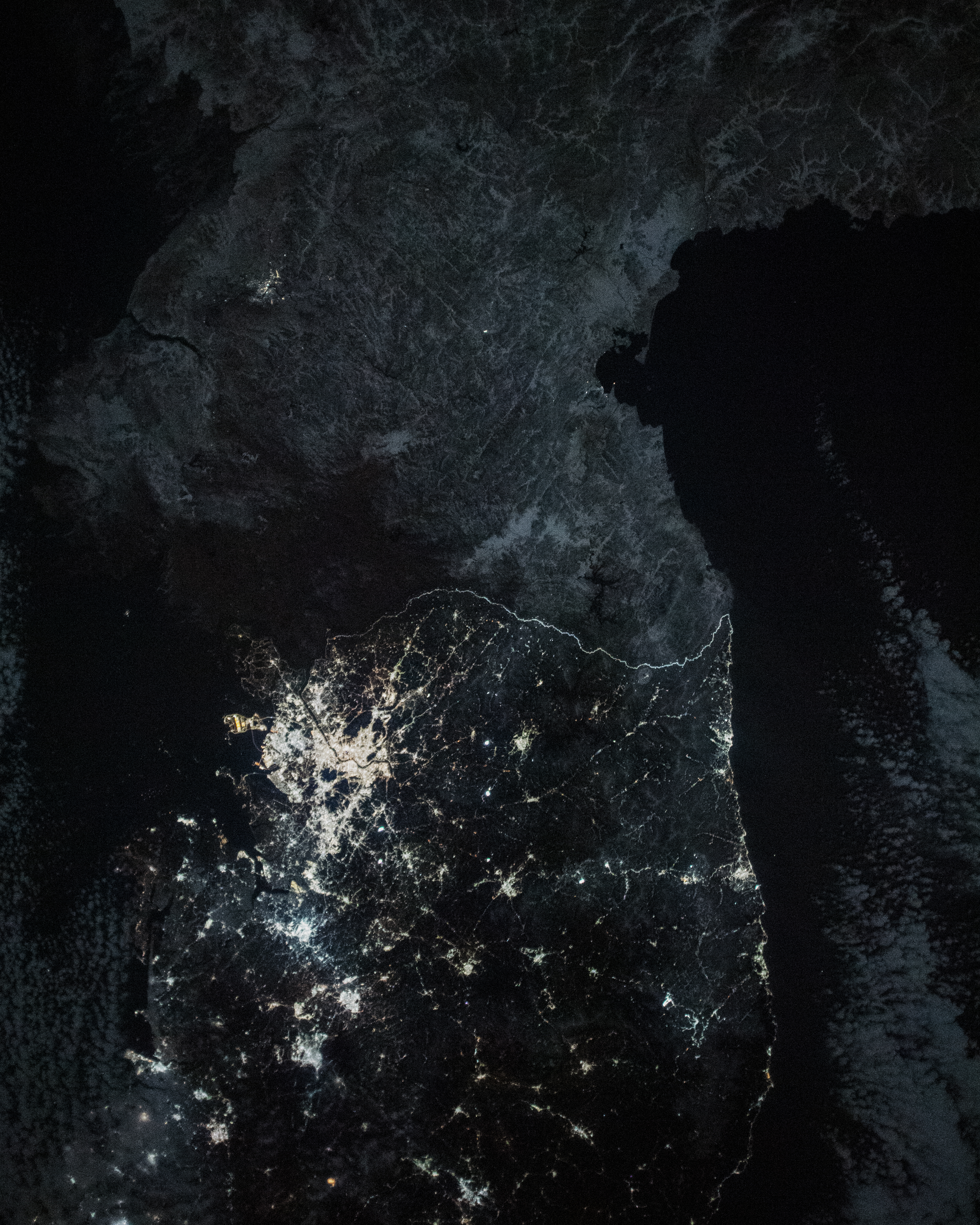
The Korean Demilitarized Zone is visible at night from space because of a noticeable lack of lighting in the northern half of the Korean Peninsula.

The Korean Demilitarized Zone intersects but does not follow the 38th parallel north, which was the border before the Korean War. It crosses the parallel on an angle, with the west end of the DMZ lying south of the parallel and the east end lying north of it.

The DMZ is 250 km (160 mi) long, approximately 4 km (2.5 mi) wide. Though the zone itself is demilitarized, the zone's borders on both sides are some of the most heavily militarized borders in the world. The Northern Limit Line, or NLL, is the disputed maritime demarcation line between North and South Korea in the Yellow Sea, not agreed in the armistice. The coastline and islands on both sides of the NLL are also heavily militarized.

== History ==
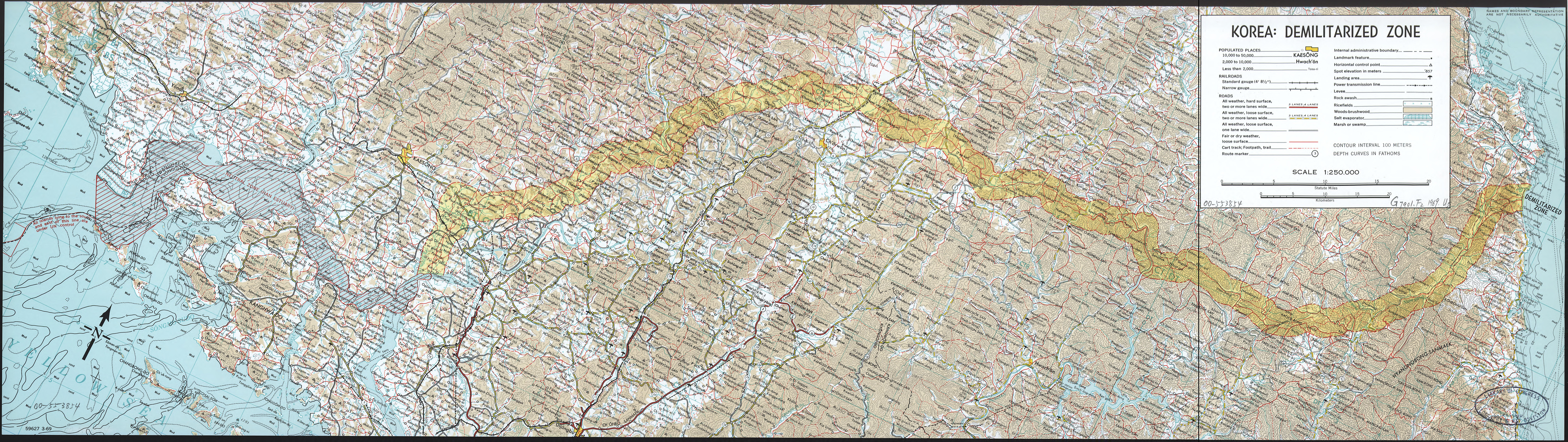
Detail of the DMZ

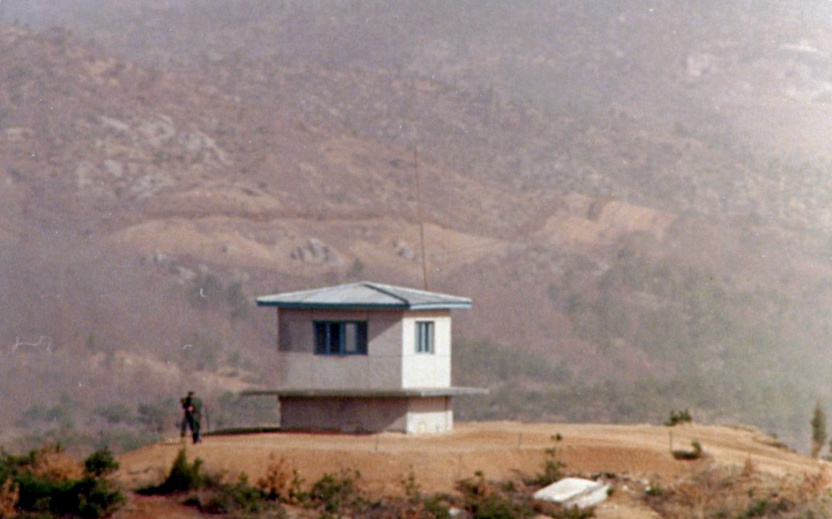
A portion of the North Korean DMZ seen from the Joint Security Area in January 1976

The 38th parallel north — which divides the Korean Peninsula roughly in half — was the original boundary between the United States and Soviet Union's short-lived administration areas of Korea at the end of World War II. Upon the creation of North Korea (formally the Democratic People's Republic of Korea or DPRK) and South Korea (formally the Republic of Korea or ROK) in 1948, it became a de facto international border and one of the tensest fronts in the Cold War.

Both the North and the South remained dependent on their sponsor states from 1948 to the outbreak of the Korean War. That conflict, which claimed over three million lives and divided the Korean Peninsula along ideological lines, commenced on 25 June 1950, with a full-front DPRK invasion across the 38th parallel, and ended in 1953 after international intervention pushed the front of the war back to near the 38th parallel.

In the Armistice Agreement of 27 July 1953, the DMZ was created as each side agreed to move their troops back 2,000 m (1.2 miles) from the front line, creating a buffer zone 4 km (2.5 mi) wide. The Military Demarcation Line (MDL) goes through the center of the DMZ and indicates where the front was when the agreement was signed.

Owing to this theoretical stalemate, and genuine hostility between the North and the South, large numbers of troops are stationed along both sides of the line, each side guarding against potential aggression from the other side, even 73 years after its establishment. The armistice agreement explains exactly how many military personnel and what kind of weapons are allowed in the DMZ. Soldiers from both sides may patrol inside the DMZ, but they may not cross the MDL. Sporadic outbreaks of violence in and around the border have killed over 500 South Korean soldiers, 50 American soldiers and 250 North Korean soldiers along the DMZ between 1953 and 1999.

Daeseong-dong (also Tae Sung Dong, "Freedom Village") in South Korea, and Kijŏng-dong (also known as the "Peace Village"), in North Korea, are the only settlements allowed by the armistice committee to remain within the boundaries of the DMZ. Residents of Tae Sung Dong are governed and protected by the United Nations Command and are generally required to spend at least 240 nights per year in the village to maintain their residency. In 2008, the village had a population of 218 people. The villagers of Tae Sung Dong are direct descendants of people who owned the land before the 1950–53 Korean War.

To continue to deter North Korean incursion, in 2014 the United States government exempted the Korean DMZ from its pledge to eliminate anti-personnel landmines. On 1 October 2018, however, a 20-day process began to remove landmines from both sides of the DMZ.

== Joint Security Area ==
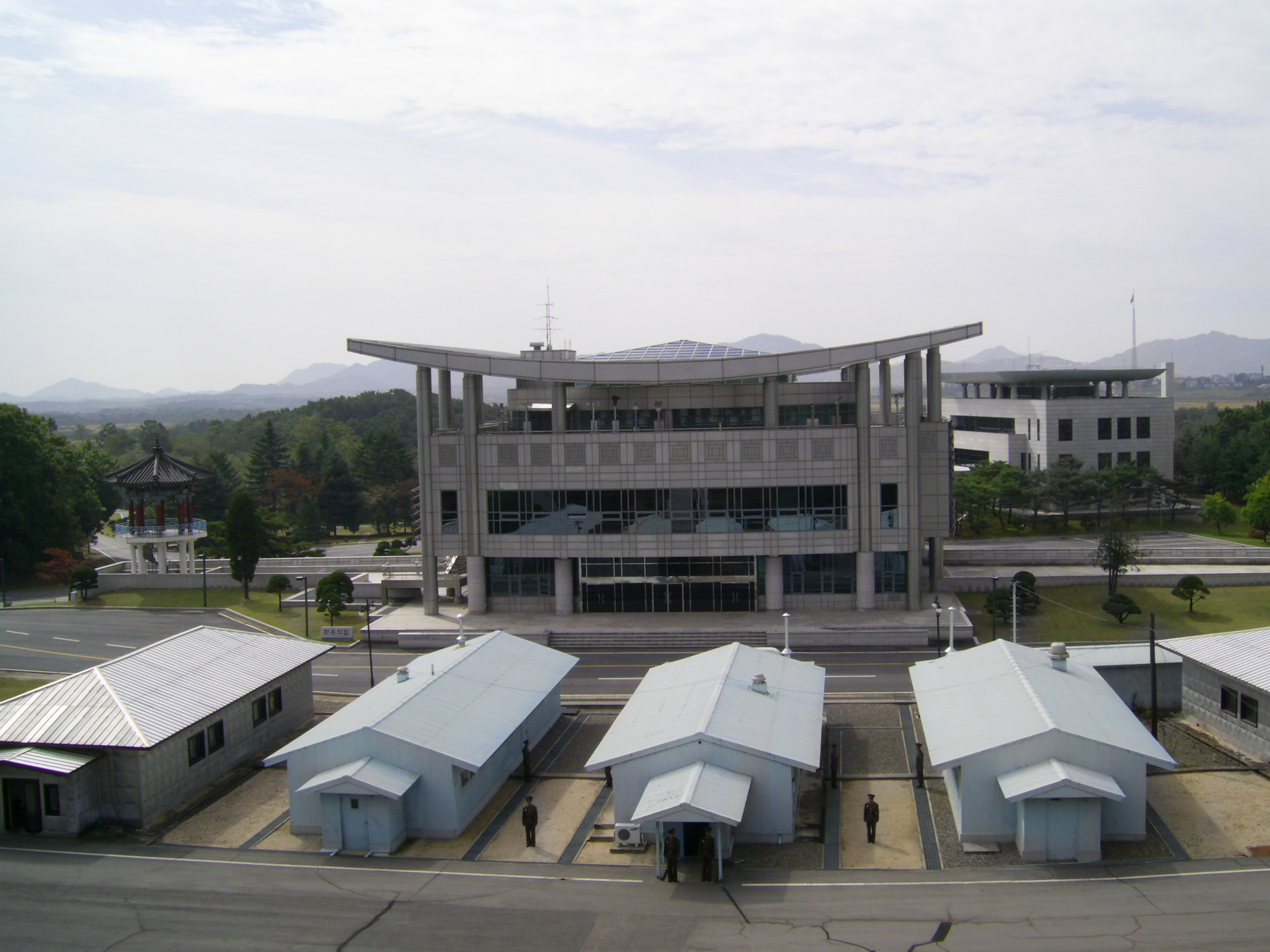
Conference Row seen from the northern side of the JSA

Inside the DMZ, near the western coast of the peninsula, Panmunjeom is the home of the Joint Security Area (JSA). Originally, it was the only connection between North and South Korea but that changed on 17 May 2007, when a Korail train went through the DMZ to the North on the new Donghae Bukbu Line built on the east coast of Korea. However, the resurrection of this line was short-lived, as it closed again in July 2008 following an incident in which a South Korean tourist was shot and killed.

The JSA is the location of the famous Bridge of No Return, over which prisoner exchanges have taken place. There are several buildings on both the north and the south side of the MDL, and there have been some built on top of it. All negotiations since 1953 have been held in the JSA, including statements of Korean solidarity, which have generally amounted to little except a slight decline of tensions.

Within the JSA are a number of buildings for joint meetings called Conference Rooms. The MDL goes through the conference rooms and down the middle of the conference tables where the North Koreans and the United Nations Command (primarily South Koreans and Americans) meet face to face.

Facing the Conference Row buildings are the North Korean Panmungak (English: Panmun Hall) and the South Korean Freedom House. In 1994, North Korea enlarged Panmungak by adding a third floor. In 1998, South Korea built a new Freedom House for its Red Cross staff and to possibly host reunions of families separated by the Korean War. The new building incorporated the old Freedom House Pagoda within its design.

Since 1953 there have been occasional confrontations and skirmishes within the JSA. The axe murder incident in August 1976 involved the attempted trimming of a tree which resulted in two deaths (Captain Arthur Bonifas and First Lieutenant Mark Barrett). Another incident occurred on 23 November 1984, when a Soviet tourist named Vasily Matuzok (sometimes spelled Matusak), who was part of an official trip to the JSA (hosted by the North), ran across the MDL shouting that he wanted to defect to the South. As many as 30 North Korean soldiers pursued him across the border, opening fire. Border guards on the South Korean side returned fire, eventually surrounding the North Koreans. One South Korean and three North Korean soldiers were killed in the action. Matuzok survived and was eventually resettled in the U.S.

In late 2009, South Korean forces in conjunction with the United Nations Command began renovation of its three guard posts and two checkpoint buildings within the JSA compound. Construction was designed to enlarge and modernize the structures. Work was undertaken a year after North Korea finished replacing four JSA guard posts on its side of the MDL. On 15 October, 2018, during the high-level talks in Panmunjeom, military officials of the rank of colonel from the two Koreas and Burke Hamilton, Secretary of the UNC Military Armistice Commission, announced measures to reduce conventional military threats, such as creating buffer zones along their land and sea boundaries and a no-fly zone above the border, removing 11 front-line guard posts by December, and demining sections of the Demilitarized Zone.

== Villages ==
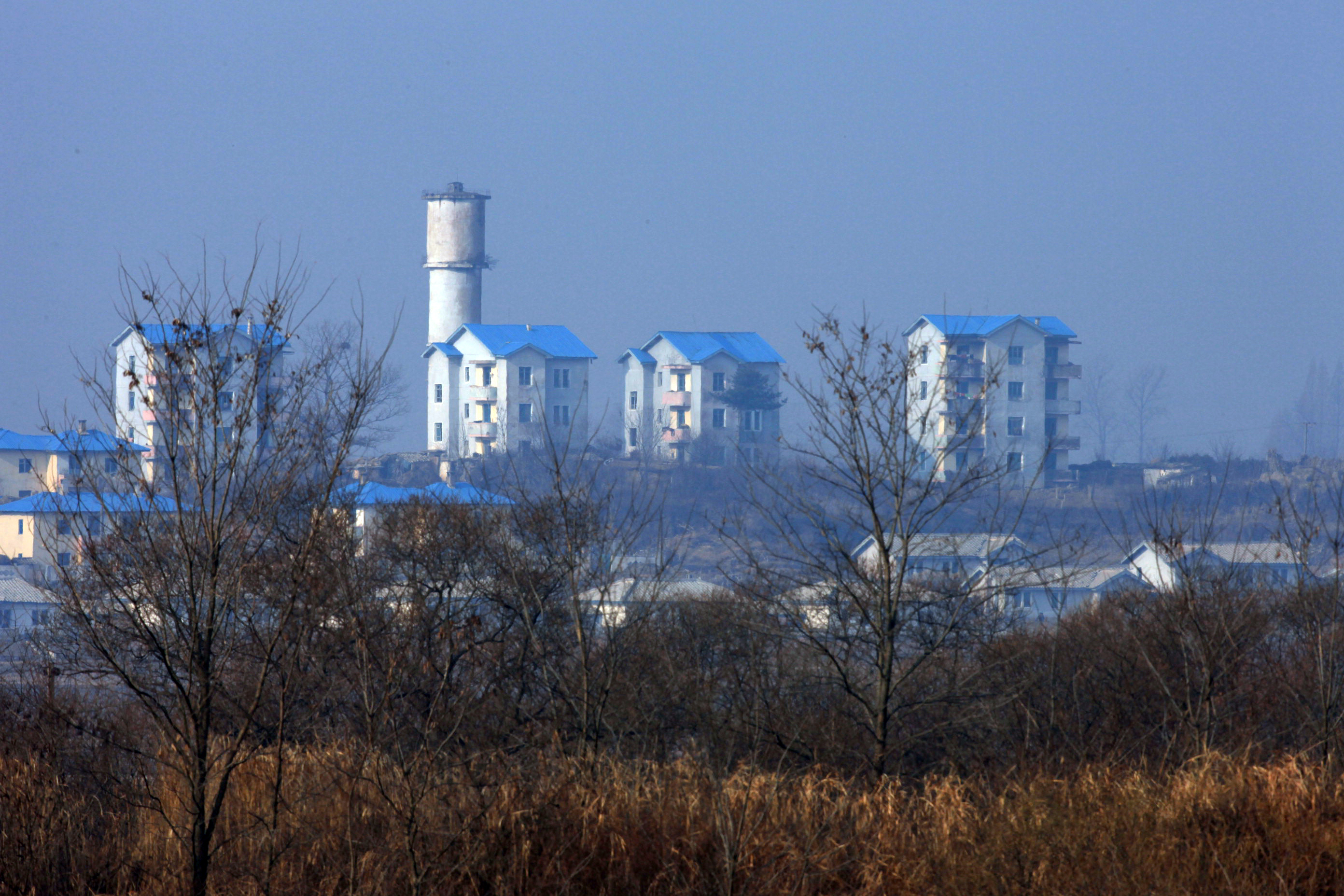
Kijŏng-dong in North Korea, seen from South Korea

Both North and South Korea maintain peace villages in sight of each other's side of the DMZ. In the South, Daeseong-dong is administered under the terms of the DMZ. Villagers are classed as South Korean citizens, but are exempt from paying tax and other civic requirements such as military service. In the North, Kijŏng-dong features a number of brightly painted, poured-concrete multi-story buildings and apartments with electric lighting. These features represented an unheard-of level of luxury for rural Koreans, North or South, in the 1950s. The town was oriented so that the bright blue roofs and white sides of the buildings would be the most distinguishing features when viewed from the border. However, based on scrutiny with modern telescopic lenses, it has been confirmed that the buildings are mere concrete shells lacking window glass or even interior rooms, with the building lights turned on and off at set times and the empty sidewalks swept by a skeleton crew of caretakers in an effort to preserve the illusion of activity.

=== Flagpoles ===
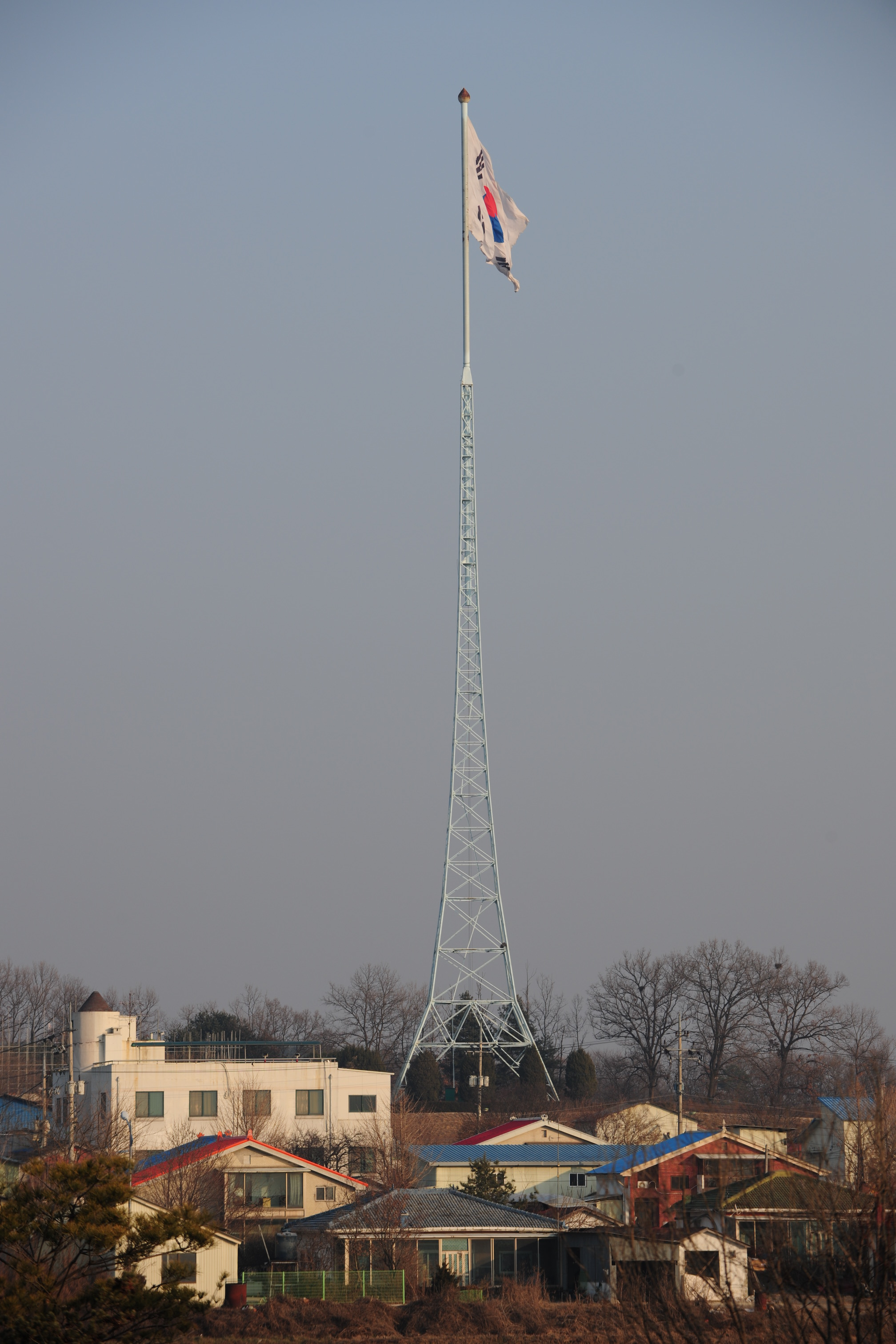
Daeseong-dong and its flagpole with the South Korea flag

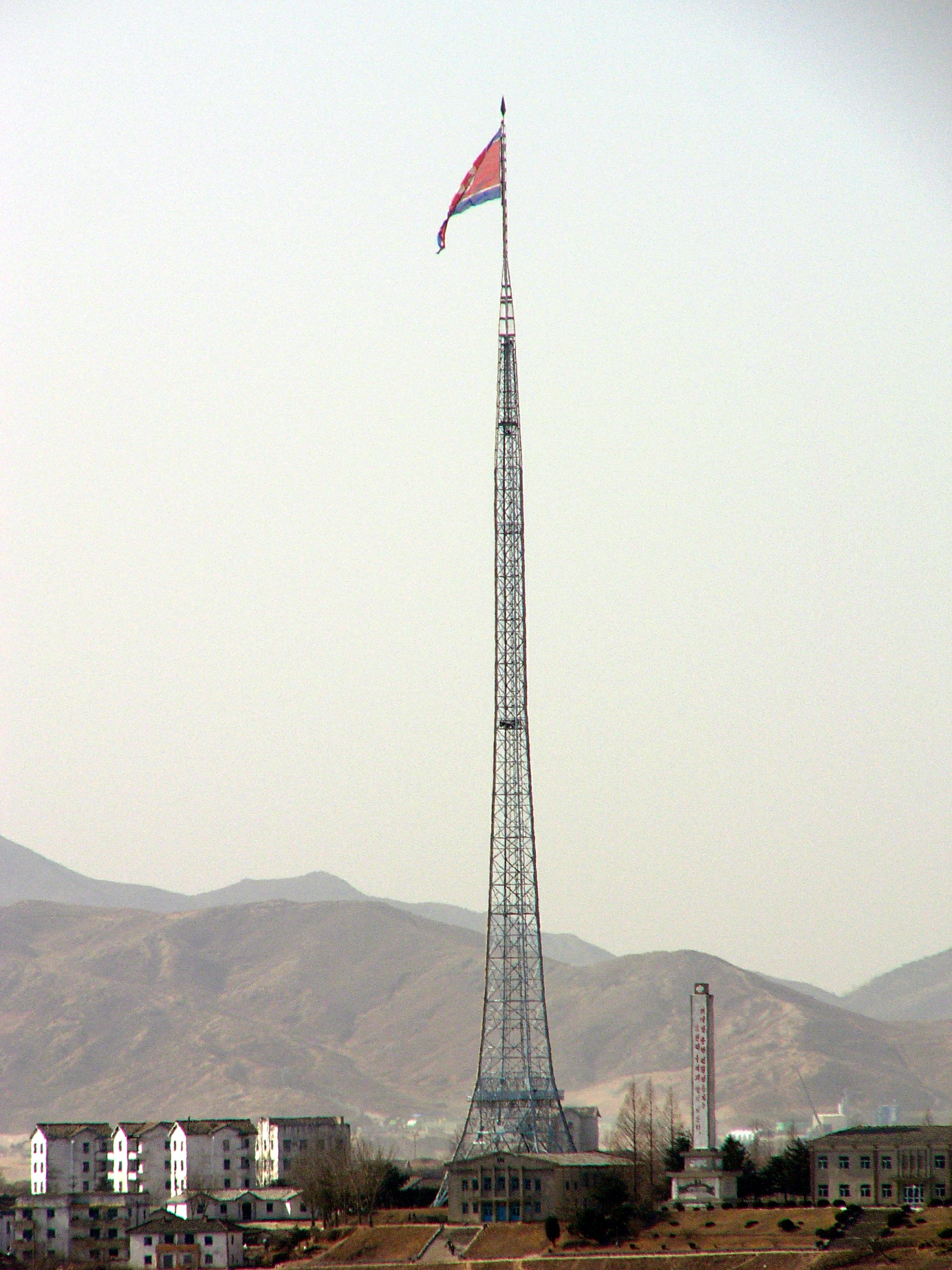
The world's seventh-tallest flagpole (160 m) flying a North Korean flag over Kijŏng-dong near Panmunjeom

In the 1980s, the South Korean government built a 100 m (328 ft) flag pole in Daeseong-dong, which flies a South Korean flag weighing 130 kg (287 lb). The North Korean government responded by building the 160 m (525 ft) Panmunjeom flagpole in Kijŏng-dong, only 1.2 km (0.7 mi) west of the border with South Korea. It flies a 270 kg (595 lb) flag of North Korea. In 2014, the Panmunjeom flagpole was the fourth tallest in the world. It is currently the world's seventh largest flagpole.

== DMZ-related incidents and incursions ==
Since demarcation, the DMZ has had numerous cases of incidents and incursions by both sides, although the North Korean government typically never acknowledges direct responsibility for any of these incidents (there are exceptions, such as the axe incident). This was particularly intense during the Korean DMZ Conflict (1966–1969) when a series of skirmishes along the DMZ resulted in the deaths of 81 American, 299 South Korean and 397 North Korean soldiers. This included the Blue House Raid in 1968, an attempt to assassinate South Korean President Park Chung Hee at the Blue House.

In 1976, in now-declassified meeting minutes, U.S. deputy secretary of defense William Clements told U.S. secretary of state Henry Kissinger that there had been 200 raids or incursions into North Korea from the south, though not by the U.S. military. Details of only a few of these incursions have become public, including raids by South Korean forces in 1967 that had sabotaged about 50 North Korean facilities.

=== Incursion tunnels ===
Since 15 November 1974, South Korea has discovered four tunnels crossing the DMZ that had been dug by North Korea. The orientation of the blasting lines within each tunnel indicated they were dug by North Korea. North Korea claimed that the tunnels were for coal mining; no coal was found in the tunnels, which were dug through granite. Some of the tunnel walls were painted black to give the appearance of anthracite.

The tunnels are believed to have been planned as a military invasion route by North Korea. They run in a north–south direction and do not have branches. Following each discovery, engineering within the tunnels has become progressively more advanced. For example, the third tunnel sloped slightly upwards as it progressed southward, to prevent water stagnation. Today, visitors from the south may visit the second, third and fourth tunnels through guided tours.

==== First tunnel ====
The first of the tunnels was discovered on 15 November 1974, by a South Korean Army patrol, noticing steam rising from the ground. The initial discovery was met with automatic fire from North Korean soldiers. Five days later, during a subsequent exploration of this tunnel, US Navy Commander Robert M. Ballinger and ROK Marine Corps Major Kim Hah-chul were killed in the tunnel by a North Korean explosive device. The blast also wounded five Americans and one South Korean from the United Nations Command.

The tunnel, which was about 0.9 by 1.2 m (3 by 4 ft), extended more than 1 km (1,100 yd) beyond the MDL into South Korea. The tunnel was reinforced with concrete slabs and had electric power and lighting. There were weapon storage areas and sleeping areas. A narrow-gauge railway with carts had also been installed. Estimates based on the tunnel's size suggest it would have allowed considerable numbers of soldiers to pass through it.

==== Second tunnel ====
The second tunnel was discovered on 19 March 1975. It is of similar length to the first tunnel. It is located between 50 and 160 m (160 and 520 ft) below ground, but is larger than the first, approximately 2 by 2 m (7 by 7 feet).

==== Third tunnel ====
The third tunnel was discovered on 17 October 1978. Unlike the previous two, the third tunnel was discovered following a tip from a North Korean defector. This tunnel is about 1,600 m (5,200 ft) long and about 73 m (240 ft) below ground. Foreign visitors touring the South Korean DMZ may view inside this tunnel using a sloped access shaft.

==== Fourth tunnel ====
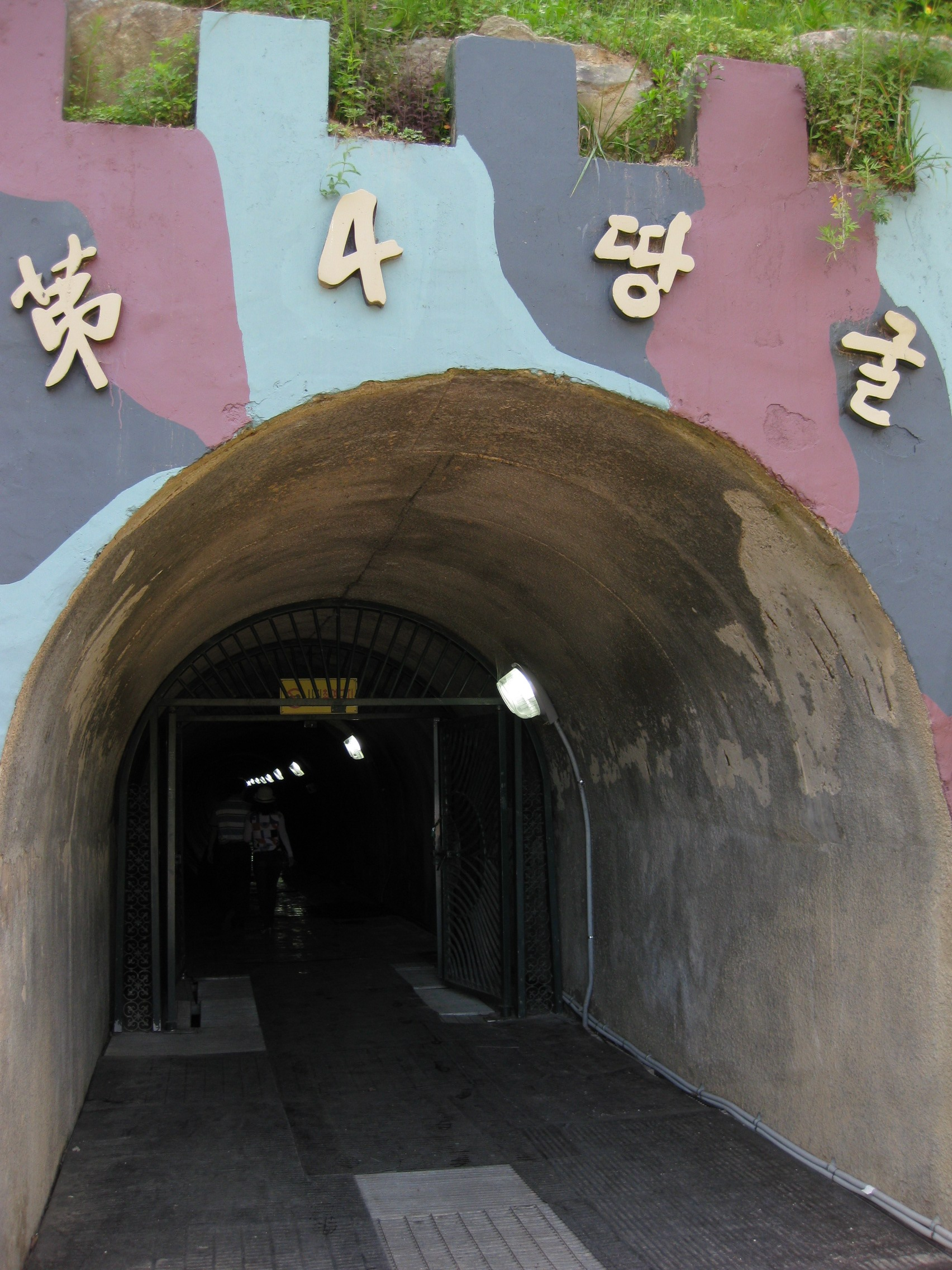
Entrance to the North Korean-dug 4th Infiltration Tunnel, Korean DMZ

A fourth tunnel was discovered on 3 March 1990, north of Haean town in the former Punchbowl battlefield. The tunnel's dimensions are 2 by 2 m (7 by 7 feet), and it is 145 m (476 ft) deep. The method of construction is almost identical in structure to the second and the third tunnels.

=== Korean wall ===
According to North Korea, between 1977 and 1979, the South Korean and United States authorities constructed a concrete wall along the DMZ. North Korea, however, began to propagate information about the wall after the fall of the Berlin Wall in 1989, when the symbolism of a wall unjustly dividing a people became more apparent.

A 2007 Reuters report revealed that there is no coast-to-coast wall located across the DMZ and that the pictures of a "wall" which have been used in North Korean propaganda have merely been pictures of concrete anti-tank barriers. While 800,000 landmines were being removed in 2018, it was shown that the Joint Security Area along the Korean border was guarded by standard barbed wire.

Various organizations, such as the North Korean tour guide company Korea Konsult, claimed a wall was dividing Korea.

In December 1999, Chu Chang-jun, North Korea's ambassador to China, repeated claims that a "wall" divided Korea. He said the south side of the wall is packed with soil, which permits access to the top of the wall and makes it effectively invisible from the south side. He also claimed that it served as a bridgehead for any northward invasion.

The United States and South Korea deny the wall's existence, although they do claim there are anti-tank barriers along some sections of the DMZ. Dutch journalist and filmmaker Peter Tetteroo also shot footage of a barrier in 2001 which his North Korean guides said was the Korean Wall.

== North Korean side of the DMZ ==
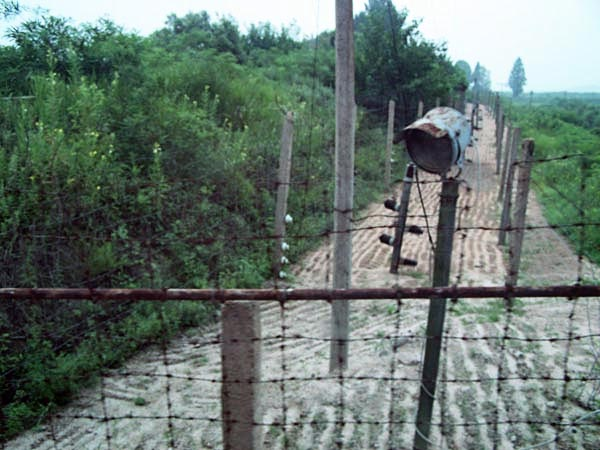
DMZ, North Korea. Electric fences are used as a means to seal North Korea off from South Korea. Behind the fence is a strip of land mines.

The North Korean side of the DMZ serves primarily to stop an invasion of North Korea from the south. Its other purpose is to ensure that North Korean citizens face significant difficulty in defecting to South Korea.

From the armistice until 1972, approximately 7,700 South Korean soldiers and agents infiltrated into North Korea to sabotage military bases and industrial areas. Around 5,300 of them never returned.

North Korea has thousands of artillery pieces near the DMZ. According to a 2018 article in The Economist, North Korea could bombard Seoul with over 10,000 rounds every minute. Experts believe that 60 percent of its total artillery is within a few kilometers of the DMZ, acting as a deterrent against a South Korean invasion.

== Propaganda ==
=== Loudspeaker installations ===
From 1953 until 2004, both sides broadcast audio propaganda across the DMZ. Massive loudspeakers mounted on several of the buildings delivered DPRK propaganda broadcasts directed towards the south as well as propaganda radio broadcasts across the border. South Korean broadcasts featured "popular music and lectures on freedom and democracy," while the North Korean broadcast featured "martial music and praises to the country's rulers." In 2004, the North and South agreed to end the broadcasts as part of an agreement to ease diplomatic tensions.

On 4 August 2015, a border incident occurred where two South Korean soldiers were wounded after stepping on landmines that had allegedly been laid on the southern side of the DMZ by North Korean forces near an ROK guard post. Both North Korea and South Korea then resumed broadcasting propaganda by loudspeaker. After four days of negotiations, on 25 August 2015 South Korea agreed to discontinue the broadcasts following a statement from North Korea's government expressing regret for the landmine incident.

On 8 January 2016, in response to North Korea's supposed successful testing of a hydrogen bomb, South Korea resumed broadcasts directed at the North. On 15 April 2016, it was reported that the South Koreans purchased a new audio system to combat the North's broadcasts.

=== Balloons ===
Both North and South Korea have held balloon propaganda leaflet campaigns since the Korean War. Many North Korean leaflets during the Cold War gave instructions and maps to help targeted South Korean soldiers in defecting. One of the leaflets found on the DMZ included a map of Cho Dae-hum's route of defection to North Korea across the DMZ. In addition to using balloons as a means of delivery, North Koreans have also used inert rockets to send leaflets to the DMZ.

In recent years, balloons from the South targeted at the DMZ and beyond have primarily been launched by South Korean non-governmental organizations. Due to the winds, the balloons tend to fall near the DMZ, where the leaflets are mostly seen by North Korean soldiers. As with the loudspeakers, balloon operations were halted by mutual agreement between 2004 and 2010. It has been assessed that the activists' balloons may contribute to reduction of remaining cooperation between the Korean governments, and the DMZ has become more militarized in recent years.

=== Dismantling ===
On 23 April 2018, both North and South Korea officially cancelled their border propaganda broadcasts. On 1 May 2018, the loudspeaker systems across the Korean border were dismantled. Both sides also committed to ending the balloon campaigns. On 5 May 2018, an attempt by North Korean defectors to disperse more balloon propaganda across the border from South Korea was halted by the South Korean government. The no-fly zone, which was established on 1 November 2018, also designates a no-fly zone for all aircraft types above the MDL, and prohibits hot-air balloons from traveling within 25 km of the Korean border's MDL.

In 2024, as a response to continuing leaflets from South Korean activists, the North flew around 1,000 balloons filled with cigarette butts, manure, waste batteries, scraps of cloth, and dirty diapers over the border. In response, South Korean activists released helium balloons with anti-Pyongyang leaflets and USB sticks with K-dramas and world news into North Korea. The actions of North Korea resulted in a June 2024 decision by the South to suspend the above deal and resume military drills near the border.

On 4 August 2025, South Korean authorities under the jurisdiction of President Lee Jae Myung removed loudspeakers broadcasting anti-North Korean messaging along the DMZ. On 14 August 2025, Kim Yo Jong denied claims that North Korea had already or planned the removal of loudspeakers and reiterated that the North has no interest in reviving negotiations with the United States or South Korea.

== Civilian Control Line ==
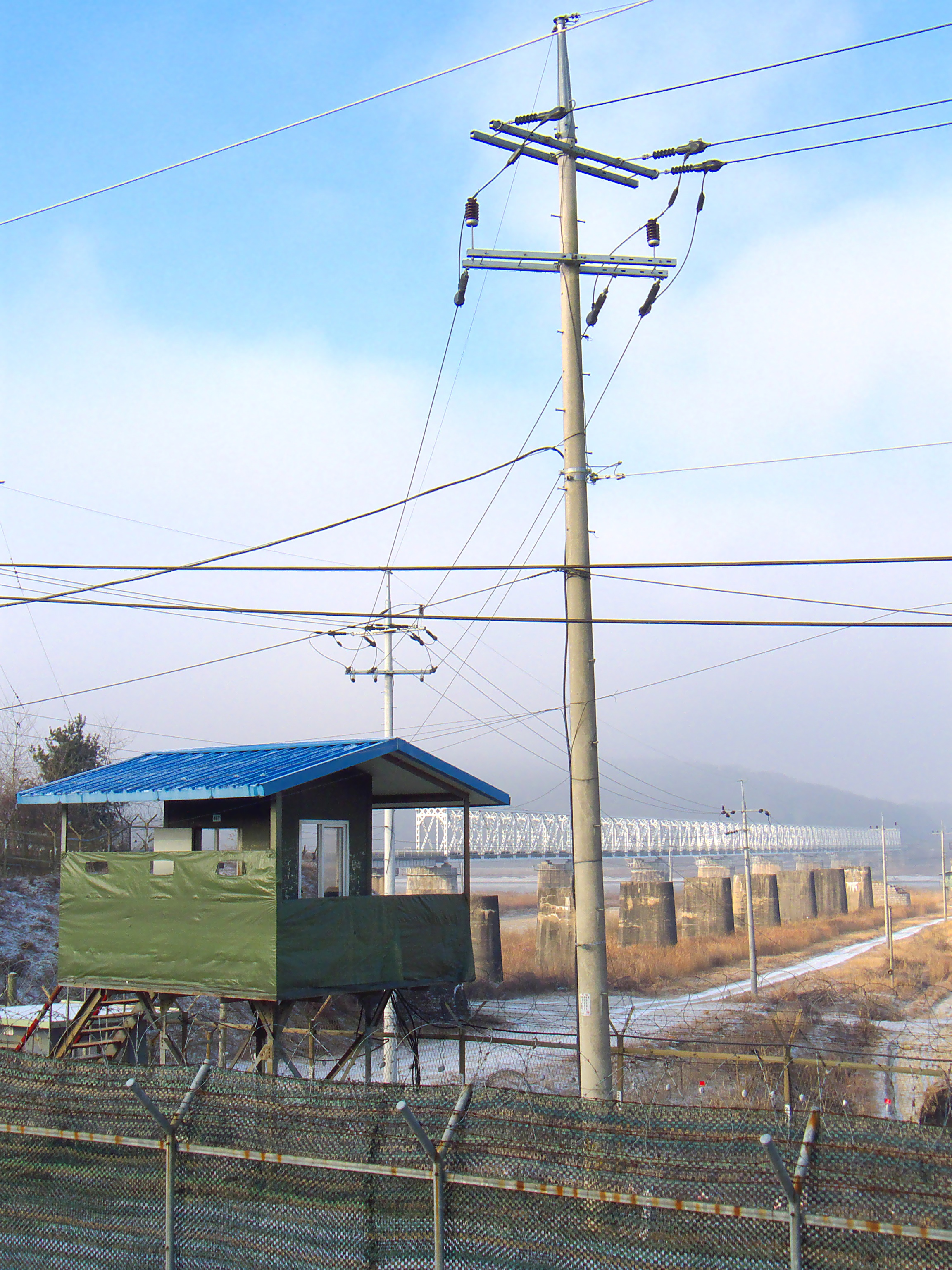
Civilian Control Line, Imjingak, Paju, South Korea

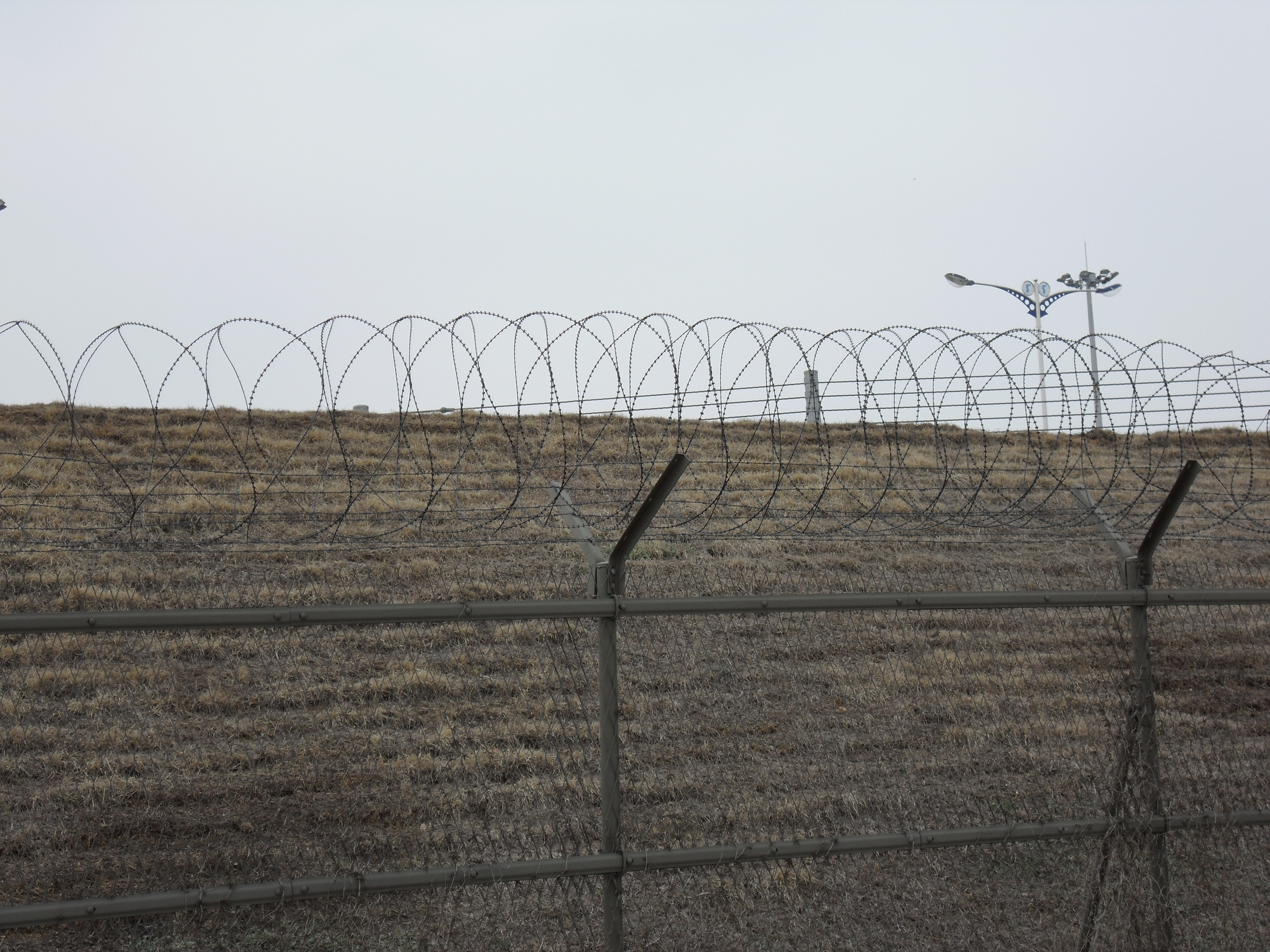
Civilian Control Line, South Korea

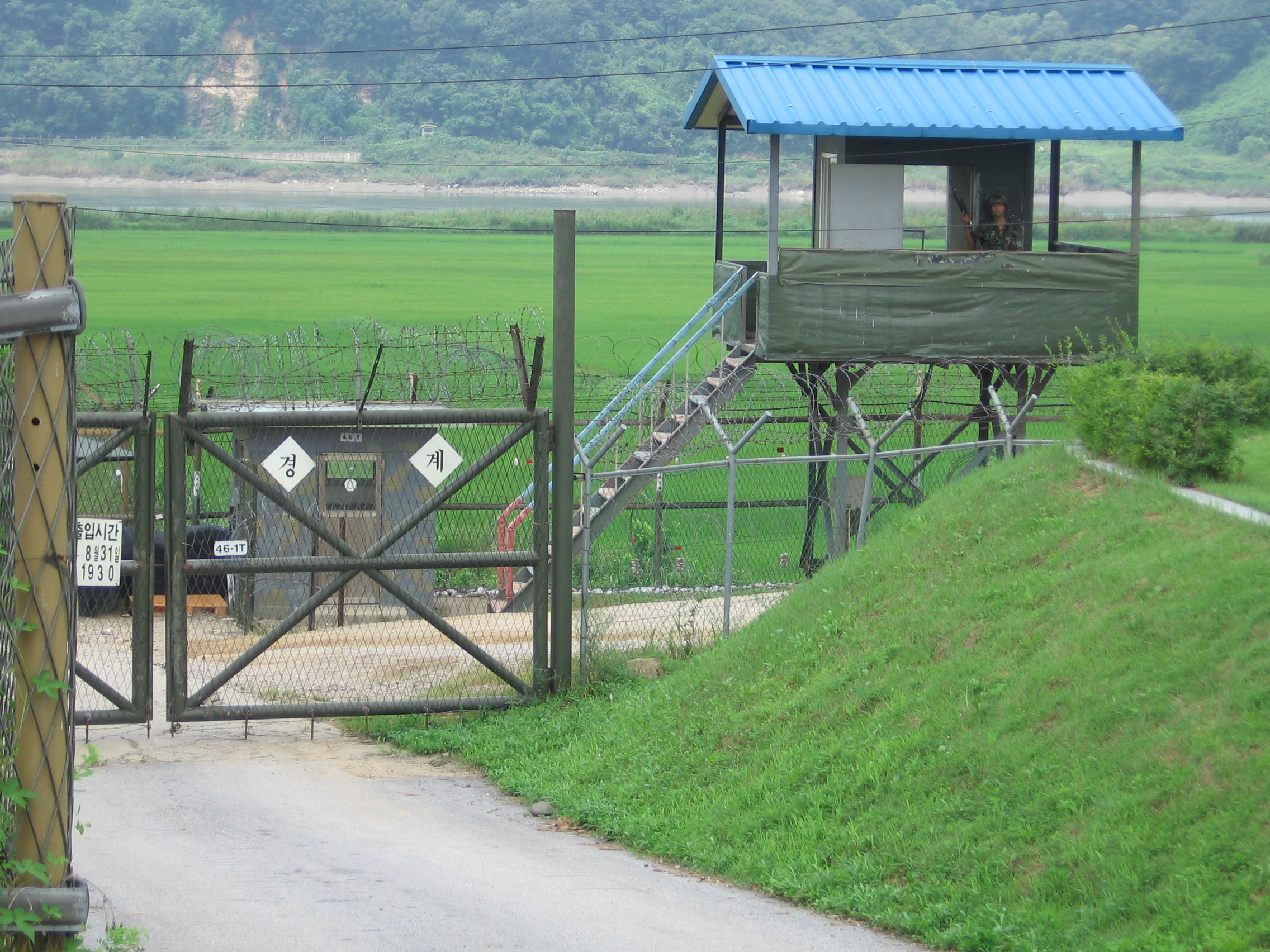
A South Korean checkpoint at the Civilian Control Line, located outside of the DMZ

The Civilian Control Line (CCL), or the Civilian Control Zone (CCZ, 민간인출입통제구역), is a line that designates an additional buffer zone to the DMZ within a distance of 5 to 20 km (3.1 to 12.4 mi) from the Southern Limit Line of the DMZ. Its purpose is to limit and control the entrance of civilians into the area in order to protect and maintain the security of military facilities and operations near the DMZ. The commander of the 8th US Army ordered the creation of the CCL and it was activated and first became effective in February 1954.

The buffer zone that falls south of the Southern Limit Line is called the Civilian Control Zone. Barbed wire fences and manned military guard posts mark the Civilian Control Line. The Civilian Control Zone is necessary for the military to monitor civilian travel to tourist destinations close to the Southern Limit Line of the DMZ like the discovered infiltration tunnels and tourist observatories. Usually when traveling within the Civilian Control Zone, South Korean soldiers accompany tourist buses and cars as armed guards to monitor the civilians as well as to protect them from North Korean intruders.

Right after the ceasefire, the Civilian Control Zone outside the DMZ encompassed 100 or so empty villages. The government implemented migration measures to attract settlers into the area. As a result, in 1983, when the area delineated by the Civilian Control Line was at its largest, a total of 39,725 residents in 8,799 households were living in the 81 villages located within the Civilian Control Zone.

Most of the tourist and media photos of the "DMZ fence" are actually photos of the CCL fence. The actual DMZ fence on the Southern Limit Line is completely off-limits to everybody except soldiers, and it is illegal to take pictures of the DMZ fence. The CCL fence acts more as a deterrent for South Korean civilians from getting too close to the dangerous DMZ and is also the final barrier for North Korean infiltrators if they get past the Southern Limit Line DMZ fence.

== Neutral Zone of the Han River Estuary ==
The whole estuary of the Han River is deemed a "Neutral Zone" and is off-limits to all civilian vessels and is treated like the rest of the DMZ. Only military vessels are allowed within this neutral zone.

According to the July 1953 Korean Armistice Agreement civil shipping was supposed to be permissible in the Han River estuary and allow Seoul to be connected to the Yellow Sea (West Sea) via the Han River. However, both Koreas and the UNC failed to make this happen. The South Korean government ordered the construction of the Ara Canal to finally connect Seoul to the Yellow Sea, which was completed in 2012. Seoul was effectively landlocked from the ocean, and Ara Canal is too narrow to handle any vessels except small tourist boats and recreational boats, so the city still cannot receive large commercial or passenger ships in its port.

In recent years Chinese fishing vessels have taken advantage of the tense situation in the Han River Estuary Neutral Zone and illegally fished in this area due to both North Korean and South Korean navies never patrolling this area due to the fear of naval battles breaking out. This has led to firefights and sinkings of boats between Chinese fishermen and South Korean Coast Guard.

On January 30, 2019, North Korean and South Korean military officials signed a landmark agreement that would open the Han River Estuary to civilian vessels for the first time since the Armistice Agreement in 1953. The agreement was scheduled to take place in April 2019 but the failure of the 2019 Hanoi Summit indefinitely postponed these plans.

== Castle of Gung Ye ==
Within the DMZ itself, in the town of Cheorwon, is the old capital of the kingdom of Taebong (901–918), a regional upstart that became Goryeo, the dynasty that ruled a united Korea from 918 to 1392.

Taebong was founded by the charismatic leader Gung Ye, a brilliant if tyrannical one-eyed ex-Buddhist monk. Rebelling against the kingdom of Silla, Korea's then ruling dynasty, he proclaimed the kingdom of Taebong — also called Later Goguryeo, in reference to the ancient kingdom of Goguryeo (37 BCE – 668 CE) – in 901, with himself as king. The kingdom consisted of much of central Korea, including areas around the DMZ. He placed his capital in Cheorwon, a mountainous region that was easily defensible (in the Korean War, this same region would earn the name "the Iron Triangle").

As a former Buddhist monk, Gung Ye actively promoted the religion of Buddhism and incorporated Buddhist ceremonies into the new kingdom. Even after Gung Ye was dethroned by his own generals and replaced by Wang Geon, the man who would rule over a united Korea as the first king of Goryeo, this Buddhist influence would continue, playing a major role in shaping the culture of medieval Korea.

The ruins of the capital city of Taebong, the ruins of the castle of Gung Ye, and Gung Ye's tomb all lie within the DMZ and are off-limits to everybody except soldiers who patrol the DMZ. Moreover, excavation work and research have been hampered by political realities. In the future, inter-Korean peace may allow for proper archaeological studies to be conducted on the castle site and other historical sites within and underneath the DMZ.

== Transportation ==
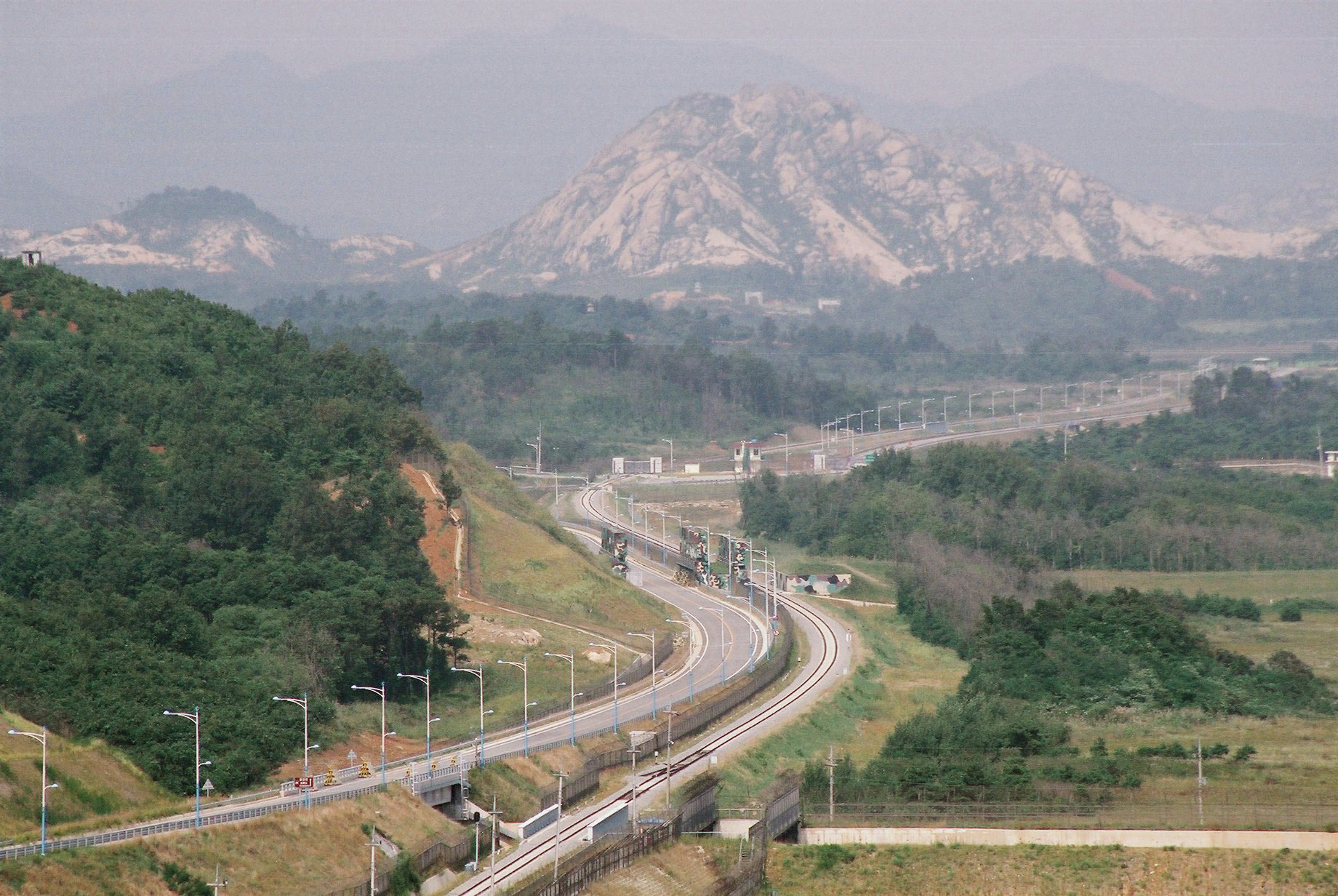
The Donghae Bukbu Line on Korea's east coast. The road and rail link was built for South Koreans visiting the Mount Kumgang Tourist Region in the North.

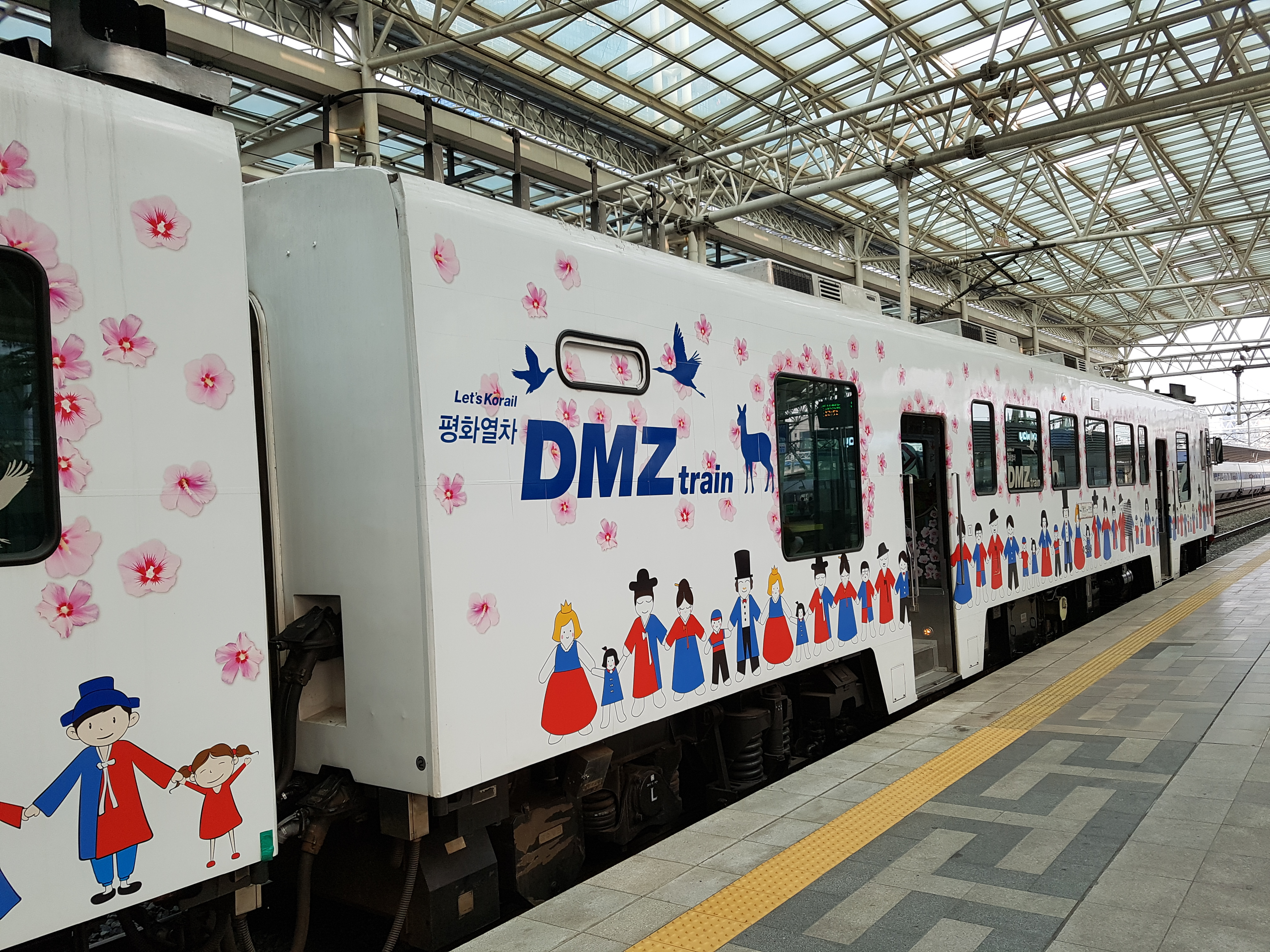
DMZ Train tour organized by Korail

Panmunjeom is the site of the negotiations that ended the Korean War and is the main center of human activity in the DMZ. The village is located on the main highway and near a railroad connecting the two Koreas.

The railway, which connects Seoul and Pyongyang, was called the Gyeongui Line before division in the 1940s. Currently the South uses the original name, but the North refers to the route as the P'yŏngbu Line. The railway line has been mainly used to carry materials and South Korean workers to the Kaesong Industrial Region. Its reconnection was seen as part of the general improvement in the relations between North and South in the early part of this century. However, in November 2008 North Korean authorities closed the railway amid growing tensions with the South. Following the death of former South Korean President Kim Dae-jung, conciliatory talks were held between South Korean officials and a North Korean delegation who attended Kim's funeral. In September 2009, the Kaesong rail and road crossing was reopened.

The road at Panmunjeom, which was known historically as Highway One in the South, was originally the only access point between the two countries on the Korean Peninsula. Passage is comparable to the strict movements that occurred at Checkpoint Charlie in Berlin at the height of the Cold War. Both North and South Korea's roads end in the JSA; the highways do not quite join as there is a 20 cm (8 in) concrete line that divides the entire site. People given the rare permission to cross this border must do so on foot before continuing their journey by road.

In 2007, on the east coast of Korea, the first train crossed the DMZ on the new Donghae Bukbu (Tonghae Pukpu) Line. The new rail crossing was built adjacent to the road which took South Koreans to Mount Kumgang Tourist Region, a region of significant cultural importance for all Koreans. More than one million civilian visitors crossed the DMZ until the route was closed following the shooting of a 53-year-old South Korean tourist in July 2008. After a joint investigation was rebuffed by North Korea, the South Korean government suspended tours to the resort. Since then, the resort and the Donghae Bukbu Line have effectively been closed by North Korea. Currently, the South Korean Korea Railroad Corporation (Korail) organizes tours to DMZ with special DMZ themed trains.

On 14 October 2018, North and South Korea, agreed to meet the summit's goal of restoring railway and road transportation, which had been cut since the Korean War, by either late November or early December 2018. Road and railway transportation along the DMZ were reconnected in November 2018, following the removal of the "frontline" guard posts and Arrowhead Hill landmines, railroad transportation between North and South Korea resumed. The same day, 30 officials from both North and South Korea started an 18-day survey of a 400-kilometer (248-mile) railroad section in North Korea alongside the DMZ between Kaesong and Sinuiju. Efforts to conduct the survey had previously been obstructed due to the presence of the guard posts and the Arrowhead Hill landmines. The survey will then follow the groundbreaking of a new railroad along the DMZ. The railway survey which involved the Gyeongui Line concluded on 5 December 2018.

On 8 December 2018, a South Korean bus crossed the DMZ into North Korea. The same day, the officials who conducted the inter-Korean survey for the Gyeongui Line began surveying the Donghae Line.

== Nature reserve ==
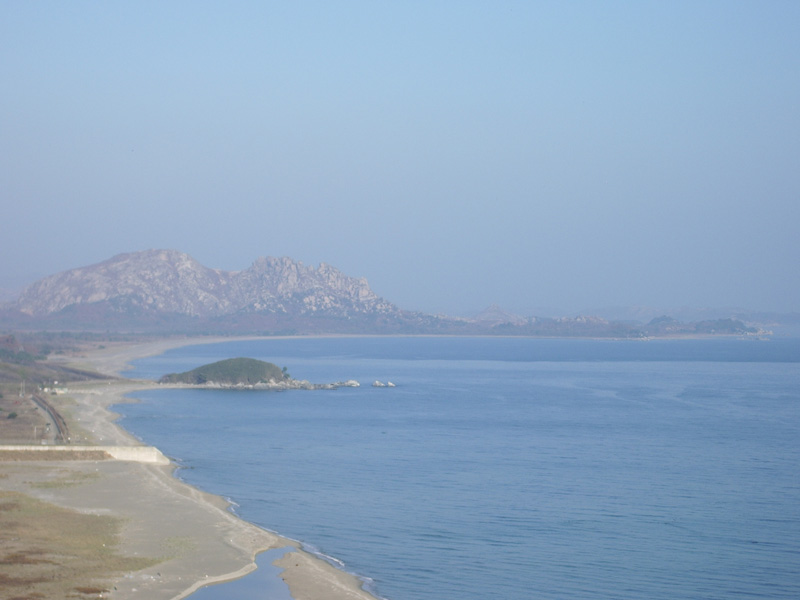
Goseong lookout point

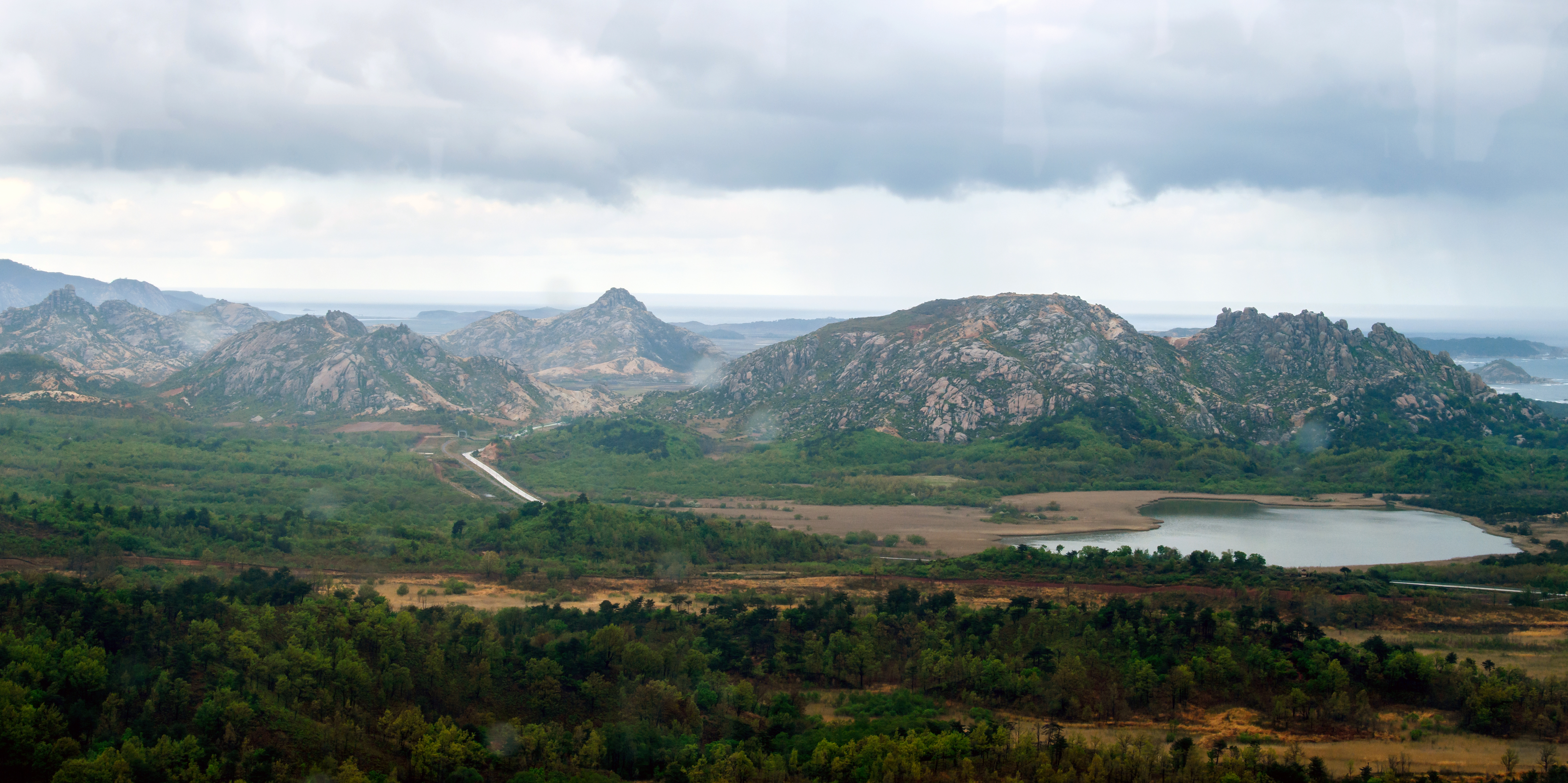
Eastern end of the DMZ 'Peace Trail' in Goseong County, Gangwon

In the past 70 years, the Korean DMZ has been a deadly place for humans, making habitation impossible. Only around the former village of Panmunjom and more recently the Donghae Bukbu Line on Korea's east coast have there been regular incursions by people.

This natural isolation along the 250 km (160 mi) length of the DMZ has created an involuntary park which is now recognized as one of the most well-preserved areas of temperate habitat in the world. In 1966 it was first proposed that the DMZ be turned into a national park.

There are over 6,000 species of animals and plants in the DMZ. The DMZ has over 100 endangered animal species of the 267 in Korea, as well as many endangered plant species, among the heavily fortified fences, landmines and listening posts. These animals include the endangered red-crowned crane (a staple of Asian art), the white-naped crane, critically endangered Korean fox and Asiatic black bear, and, potentially, the extremely rare Siberian tiger, Amur leopard, and endangered marine species such as western gray whale. Ecologists have identified some 2,900 plant species, 70 types of mammals and 320 kinds of birds within the narrow buffer zone. Additional surveys are now being conducted throughout the region. There is a similar situation in the German Green Belt, where a heavily fortified border used to run between West Germany and East Germany.

The DMZ owes its varied biodiversity to its geography, which crosses mountains, prairies, swamps, lakes, and tidal marshes. Environmentalists hope that the DMZ will be conserved as a wildlife refuge, with a well-developed set of objective and management plans vetted and in place. In 2005, CNN founder and media mogul Ted Turner, on a visit to North Korea, said that he would financially support any plans to turn the DMZ into a peace park and a UN-protected World Heritage Site.

In September 2011, South Korea submitted a nomination form to Man and the Biosphere Programme (MAB) in UNESCO for designation of 435 km^{2} (168 sq mi) in the southern part of the DMZ below the Military Demarcation Line, as well as 2,979 km^{2} (1,150 sq mi) in privately controlled areas, as a Biosphere Reserve according to the Statutory Framework of the World Network of Biosphere Reserves. The MAB National Committee of the Republic of Korea mentioned only the southern part of DMZ to be nominated since there was no response from Pyongyang when it requested Pyongyang to push jointly. North Korea is a member nation of the international coordinating council of UNESCO's Man and the Biosphere Programme, which designates Biosphere Reserves.

North Korea opposed the application as a violation of the armistice agreement during the council's meeting in Paris on 9 to 13 July 2011. The South Korean government's attempt to designate the Demilitarized Zone (DMZ) a UNESCO Biosphere Reserve was turned down at UNESCO's MAB council meeting in Paris in July 2012. Pyongyang expressed its opposition by sending letters to 32 council member countries, except for South Korea, and the UNESCO headquarters a month prior to the meeting. At the council meeting, Pyongyang said the designation violated the Armistice Agreement.

== Destruction of guard posts ==
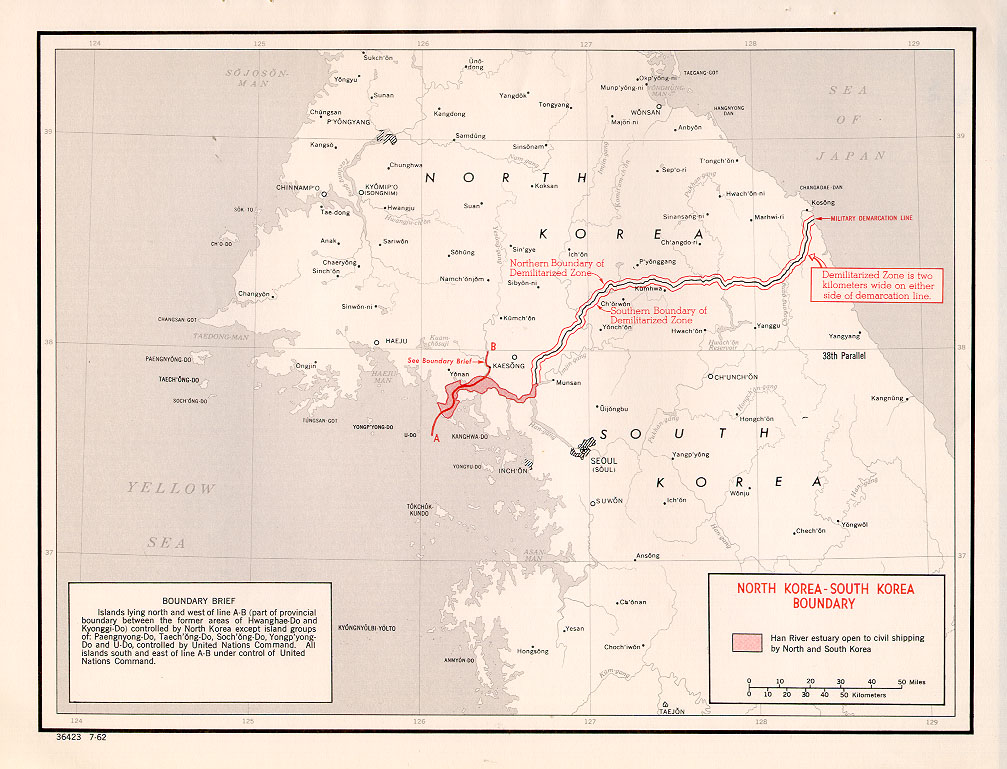
Map of the Korean DMZ

On 26 October 2018, South Korean major general Kim Do-gyun and North Korean lieutenant general An Ik-san met in Tongilgak (the "Unification Pavilion"), a North Korean building located within the JSA. There, they began implementing new protocols which aim to reduce tension by requiring both North and South Korea to destroy 22 guard posts across the DMZ, among other steps. Both generals approved requirements for the guard posts to be destroyed by the end of November 2018. The JSA's guard posts were destroyed on 25 October 2018. North and South Korea agreed to dismantle 11 guard posts located within their individual country and deemed as "front-line". It was also agreed that after the posts are dismantled, both Koreas would also withdraw equipment and personnel stationed at each post as well. In tandem with the September 2018 Pyongyang and Military Domain Agreements, both sides also agreed to gradually remove all guard posts near the DMZ following verification in December 2018.

However, all remaining troops and equipment, including weapons, were withdrawn from all of the 22 "frontline" guard posts before destruction began and both Koreas later agreed to individually destroy 10 of these guard posts instead of 11.

On 4 November 2018, the North and South Korean governments hoisted a yellow flag above each of their 11 DMZ guard posts to publicly indicate that they all will be dismantled. On 10 November 2018, the withdrawal of military personnel and weapons from all of the DMZ's 22 "front-line" guard posts was completed. The destruction of 20 guard posts officially began on 11 November 2018. However, both Koreas amended the original agreement and decided to preserve 2 of the 22 now demilitarized frontline guard posts. Both of the posts which were planned to be preserved are located on the opposite sides of the Korean border.

On 15 November 2018, destruction of two DMZ guard posts, one being located in South Korea and the other located in North Korea, was completed. Work was still ongoing to complete the destruction of other guard posts as well. On 23 November 2018, it was revealed that South Korea was slowly destroying their guard posts with excavators.

On 20 November 2018, North Korea, hoping to further ease tensions with South Korea, destroyed all of their 10 remaining "frontline" guard posts. The South Korean Defense Ministry released photos confirming this and also released a statement stating that North Korea had informed them about the plans to demolish them before it took place. This came in accordance with the earlier agreements. South Korea also released videos of the guard posts being destroyed as well.

On 30 November 2018, both Koreas completed work to dismantle 10 of their "frontline" guard posts. However, the later agreement for each Korea to preserve one "frontline" post was upheld as well. The "frontline" guard post which was preserved on the North Korean side of the DMZ was visited by Kim Jong Un in 2013 when tensions were rising between both Koreas.

== Establishment of buffer zones, no-fly zones and Yellow Sea peace zones ==
On 1 November 2018, buffer zones were established across the DMZ by the North and South Korean militaries. In compliance with the Comprehensive Military Agreement which was signed at the September 2018 inter-Korean summit, the buffer zone helps ensure that both North and South Korea will effectively ban hostility on land, air, and sea. Both Koreas are prohibited from conducting live-fire artillery drills and regiment-level field maneuvering exercises or those by bigger units within 5 kilometers of the Military Demarcation Line (MDL). The buffer zones stretch from the north of the island Deokjeokdo to the south of the island Chodo in the West Sea and the north of Sokcho and south of Tongchon County in the East (Yellow) Sea.

No-fly zones have also been established along the DMZ to ban the operation of drones, helicopters and other aircraft over an area up to 40 km (25 mi) away from the MDL. For UAVs, within 15 km (9.3 mi) from the MDL in the East and 10 km (6.2 mi) from the MDL in the West. Hot-air balloons cannot travel within 25 km (16 mi) of the DMZ as well. For fixed-wing aircraft, no fly zones are designated within 40 km (25 mi) from the MDL in the East (between MDL Markers No. 0646 and 1292) and within 20 km (12 mi) of the MDL in the West (between MDL Markers No. 0001 and 0646). For rotary-wing aircraft, the no fly zones are designated within 10 km (6.2 mi) of the MDL.

Both Koreas also created "peace zones" near their disputed Yellow Sea border.

== Reconnecting of MDL-crossing road ==
On 22 November 2018, North and South Korea completed construction to connect a three-kilometer (1.9 mi) road along the DMZ, 90 km (56 mi) northeast of Seoul. This road, which crosses the Korean MDL land border, consists of 1.7 km (1.1 mi) in South Korea and 1.3 km (0.81 mi) in North Korea. The road was reconnected for the first time in 14 years to assist with a process at the DMZ's Arrowhead Hill involving the removal of landmines and exhumation of Korean War remains.

== Presence of landmines and Korean War remains ==
On 1 October 2018, North and South Korean military engineers began a scheduled 20 day removal process of landmines and other explosives planted across the JSA. Work to remove landmines from the Joint Security Area was completed on 25 October 2018. Demining had begun at the DMZ's Arrowhead Hill and resulted in the discovery of Korean War remains. Work between both Koreas to remove landmines from Arrowhead Hill was completed on 30 November 2018.

== Military border crossing ==
On 12 December 2018, militaries from both Koreas crossed the DMZ's MDL into the opposition countries for the first time in history to inspect and verify the removal of "frontline" guard posts.

== Meeting of Trump, Kim, and Moon at the DMZ ==
Trump stepping into North Korean territory by crossing the low stone curb separating the North and South at 3:45 p.m. KST (2:45 a.m. EDT), becoming the first U.S. president to step into North Korea since the Korean War

On 30 June 2019, U.S. president Donald Trump became the first sitting U.S. president to enter North Korea, doing so at the DMZ line. After crossing into North Korea, Trump and North Korean chairman Kim Jong Un met and shook hands. Kim stated, in Korean, "It's good to see you again", "I never expected to meet you at this place" and "you are the first U.S. president to cross the border." Both men then briefly crossed the border line before crossing back into South Korea.

On the South Korean side of the DMZ, Kim, South Korean president Moon Jae-in, and Trump held a brief chat before holding an hour-long meeting at the DMZ's Inter-Korean House of Freedom.

== Pilgrimages ==
An annual youth pilgrimage including a 6-day peace walk to the DMZ is organised by the Catholic Church. The first pilgrimage took place in 2012. Young people from 15 countries attended the 2019 pilgrimage. The 2022 pilgrimage included visits to the Ulleungdo and Dokdo islands.

== See also ==
- Bamboo Curtain
- Iron Curtain
- List of border incidents involving North and South Korea
- Neutral Nations Supervisory Commission
- North Korea–South Korea relations
- Peace lines
- United Nations Buffer Zone in Cyprus
- Vietnamese Demilitarized Zone
- Korean conflict
