= May 2018 inter-Korean summit =

2rd inter-Korean summit meeting held in 2018

May 2018 inter-Korean summit South Korea: 2018년 남북정상회담 North Korea: 2018년 북남수뇌상봉
- 26 May 2018
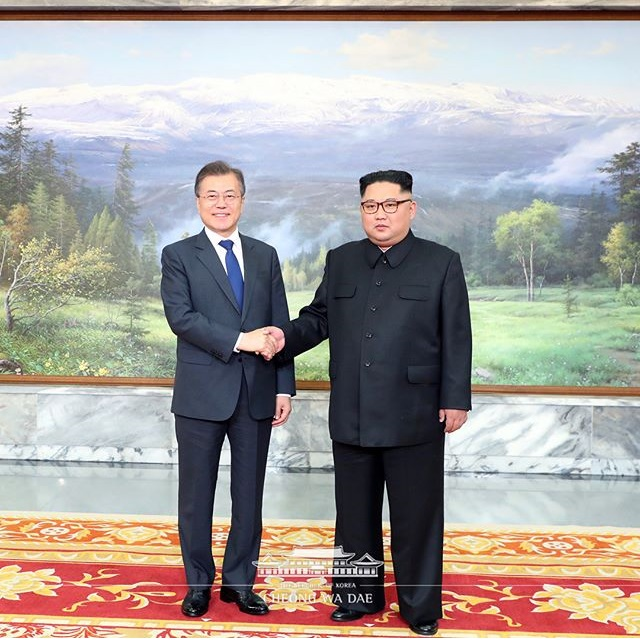
- Moon Jae-in and Kim Jong Un shaking hands
- Host country: North Korea
- Motto: 평화, 새로운 시작 平和, 새로운 始作 (Peace, A New Start)
- Venues: Unification Pavilion
- Participants: (North Korea) Kim Jong Un (South Korea) Moon Jae-in
- Website: 2018 Inter-Korean Summit

The May 2018 inter-Korean summit was the second inter-Korean summit in 2018. On 26 May, North Korean state chairman Kim Jong Un and South Korean president Moon Jae-in met again in the joint Security Area, this time on the North Korean side in the Inter-Korean Peace House in the Unification Pavilion. The meeting took two hours, and unlike other summits it had not been publicly announced beforehand. Photos released by South Korea's presidential office showed Moon arriving at the northern side of the Panmunjom truce village and shaking hands with Kim's sister, Kim Yo Jong, before sitting down with Kim for their summit. Moon was accompanied by Suh Hoon, Director of the National Intelligence Service of South Korea, while Kim was joined by Kim Yong-chol, a former military intelligence chief who is now a vice chairman of the North Korean ruling party's central committee tasked with inter-Korean relations. The meeting was largely centered around North Korean leader Kim Jong Un's upcoming summit with US President Donald Trump. Kim and Moon also embraced before Moon returned to South Korea. On 27 May, Moon stated in a public address that he and Kim agreed to meet again at "anytime and anyplace" without any formality and that the North Korean leader once again pledged to denuclearize the Korean Peninsula in accordance with the Panmunjom Declaration.

== Background ==
On 27 April 2018, South Korean president Moon Jae-in and North Korean leader Kim Jong Un held a summit meeting at the Peace House on the south side of Panmunjom and signed the Panmunjom Declaration. The two leaders agreed to exchange views via hotline and to hold talks if necessary. On 24 May 2018, United States President Donald Trump suddenly announced the cancellation of the summit meeting between the two countries scheduled to be held in Singapore next month. The next day, he changed his tune and said that the meeting would proceed as scheduled. In response, Kim Jong Un contacted Moon Jae-in on the afternoon of 26 May, hoping that the two could meet to discuss matters such as the summit meeting between the two countries. Moon Jae-in then agreed to meet, explaining that the changes in the situation in the past few days had made it "difficult" for him, and that in order to remove these obstacles and realize the summit meeting between the two countries, he needed to meet with Kim Jong Un. This made the two leaders meet again 29 days after their meeting in April as well as within a whirlwind 24 hour notice.

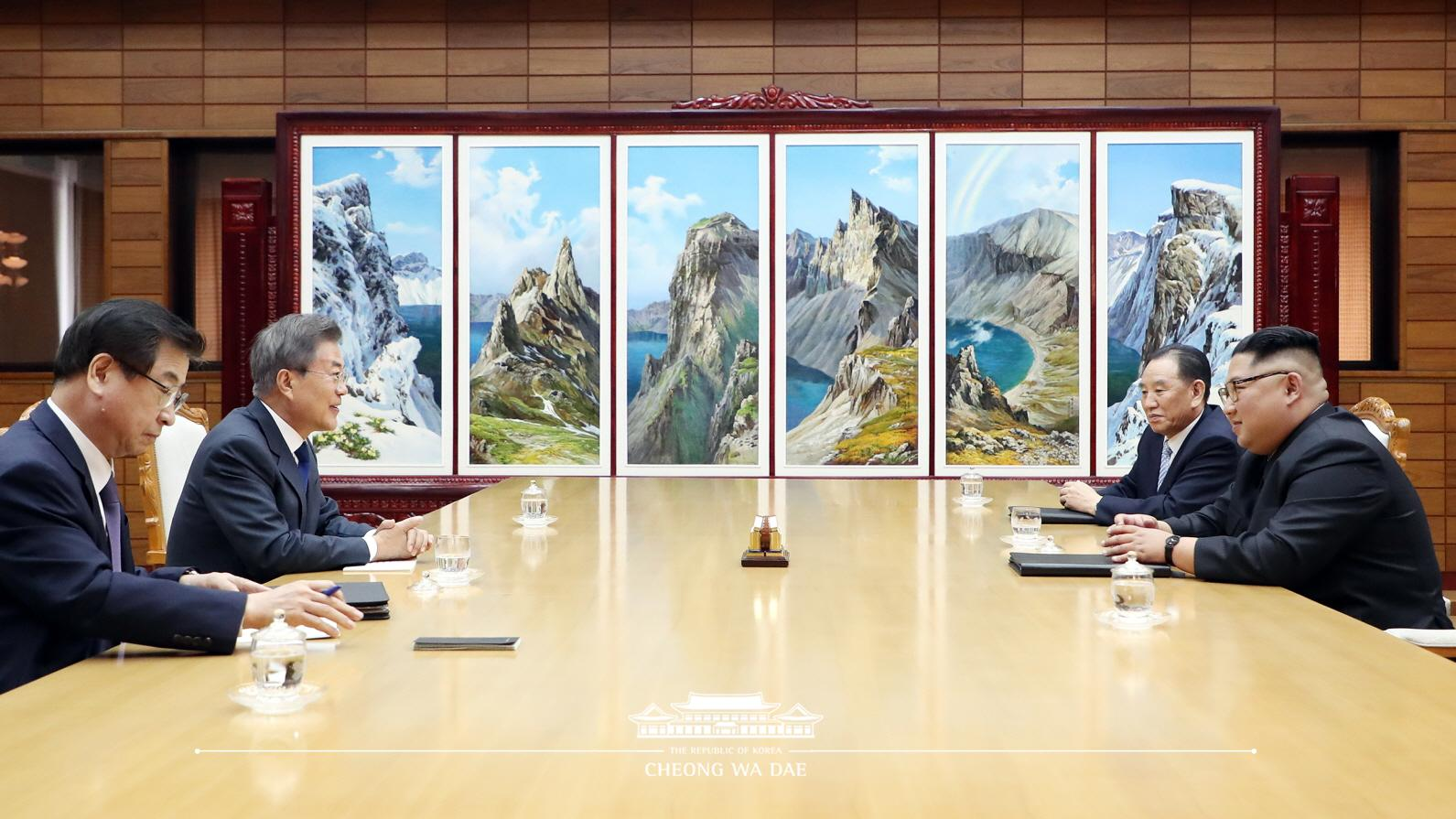
Moon and Kim talking at the summit

== Meeting ==
At 3 p.m., Moon Jae-in, along with Suh Hoon, director of the National Intelligence Service, and Song In-bae, the first deputy secretary of the Presidential Secretariat, arrived at the Unification Pavilion on the north side of Panmunjom and were welcomed by Kim Jong Un, Kim Yo Jong, and the honor guard of the Korean People's Army. Afterwards, the two leaders shook hands and greeted each other, and Moon Jae-in wrote in the guestbook: "Peace and prosperity on the Korean Peninsula, together with Chairman Kim Jong Un of the Democratic People's Republic of Korea." Then, the two formally began their talks. Moon and Kim agreed to also convene inter-Korean high-level talks on 1 June, to be followed by talks between military authorities to ease military tensions and a general-level meeting and a Red Cross meeting on the reunion of separated families at a later time. Both leaders also agreed to accelerate the implementation of the Panmunjom Declaration and meet again at "anytime and anyplace" without formality and also exchanged views on the successful holding of the DPRK-US summit.

== Reactions ==
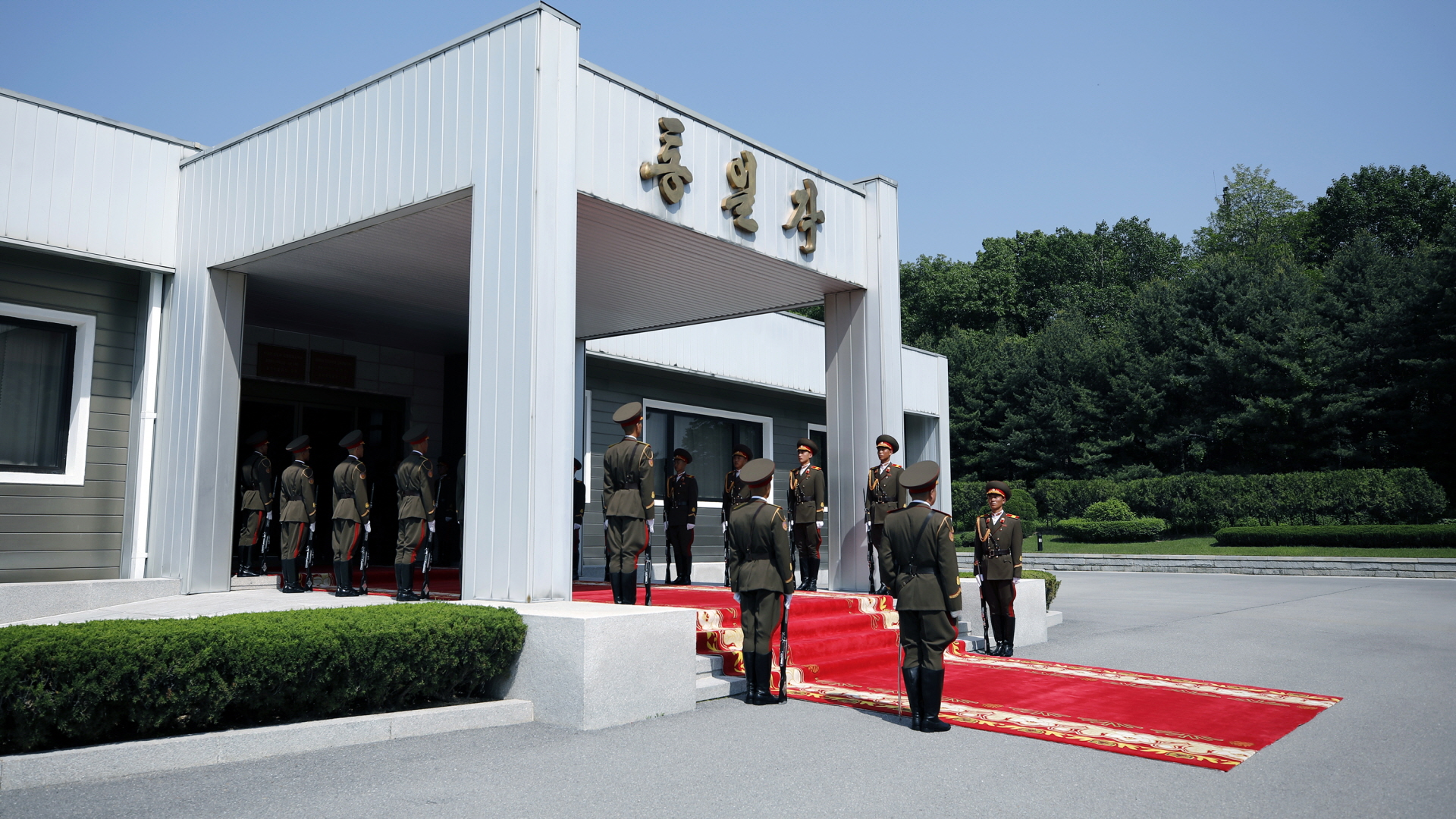
The entrance to the Unification Pavilion on 27 May 2018.

Many in South Korea, both the ruling and opposition parties, considered the talks to be "unconventional". Baek Hye-ryun, a spokesperson for the ruling Democratic Party, called the talks "unprecedented" and a "reaffirmation" of the will and trust for peace on the Korean Peninsula. Choi Kyung-hwan of the Party for Democracy and Peace believed that the talks were held suddenly under the uncertainty of the summit between North Korea and the United States, and that such a meeting would not have been possible if Moon Jae-in and Kim Jong Un did not trust each other. Therefore, Choi hoped that the leaders of the two countries could " resolve all issues through hotlines and direct dialogue on the basis of trust". Shin Sang-hyun, chief spokesperson for the Bareunmirae Party, said that the talks were held as needed and set a precedent for summit meetings to be held at any time, and therefore were "very meaningful". The conservative newspaper The Dong-A Ilbo also believed that the summit was held hastily in consideration of the special circumstances of the international situation, and that if the summit could become a regular event, the relationship between North and South Korea would be greatly improved. However, Hong Joon-pyo, the new leader of the Liberty Korea Party, said that the meeting "did not have any new content or progress in the discussion". As for North Korea, the Korean Central News Agency said that the leaders of the two countries "did not adhere to formalities and etiquette" and exchanged views and conducted dialogue frankly on important issues, which was "another historic opportunity" to improve the relationship between the two countries.

== Aftermath ==
The high-level talks between the two Koreas were held as scheduled on 1 June at the Peace House south of Panmunjom. The South Korean side was led by Minister of Unification Cho Myoung-gyon, and included Vice Minister of Land, Infrastructure and Transport Kim Jong-ryol, Vice Minister of Culture, Sports and Tourism Roh Tae-gang, Director of the Unification Policy Office of the Ministry of Unification Kim Nam-jung, and Director of the Prime Minister's Office Ahn Moon-hyeon. The North Korean side was led by Chairman of the Committee for the Peaceful Reunification of the Fatherland Ri Son-gwon, and included Vice Minister of Railways Kim Yoon-hyuk, Vice Minister of Sports Won Gil-woo, Vice Chairman of the Committee for the Peaceful Reunification of the Fatherland Park Yong-il, and Vice Chairman of the Committee for National Economic Cooperation Park Myong-chol. Officials from both countries agreed to move forward with the military and Red Cross talks. Both Koreas also agreed to reopen a liaison office located within a factory park in Kaesong which had been jointly operated by the countries as an economic zone until the South shut it down in February 2016 after a North Korean nuclear test. The two countries agreed to hold a general-level meeting at the Unification Pavilion north of Panmunjom on 14 June 2018, and a sports meeting at the Peace House on June 18 to discuss the joint participation of the two countries in the Jakarta Asian Games. The first talks involving the Red Cross and military were then held at North Korea's Mount Kumgang resort on 22 June 2018 and during the talks, it was agreed that family reunions which had been cancelled in 2015 would resume between 20 and 26 August 2018.

The first family unions since the end of the Korean War then took place on 20 August when about 330 South Koreans from 89 families, many in wheelchairs, embraced 185 separated relatives from the North at the Mount Kumgang resort, also known as Diamond Mountain. South Korean members of these families returned home on 22 August. Between 24 August and 26 August, a second round of family reunions occurred when a total of 326 South Koreans from 81 families traveled to Mount Kumgang to meet nearly 100 of their long-separated relatives from the North. On 14 September, the Inter-Korean Liaison Office opened at the Kaesong park location. During the general-level talks held on 14 June, the two countries agreed to repair the military communication lines on the east and west coasts that had been interrupted since 2001 in order to facilitate exchanges and cooperation between the two militaries, but failed to reach an agreement on setting up a high-level military hotline and restarting the defense ministers' talks mechanism. During the sports talks held on 18 June, the two countries will hold two basketball games in Pyongyang and Seoul in July. In addition, at the opening and closing ceremonies of the upcoming 2018 Jakarta Asian Games, the two countries would march together with the Korean Unification Flag and the traditional folk song "Arirang", and would compete as a joint team in 6 events (women's basketball, men's and women's dragon boats, men's quadruple sculls 2000m, men's eight sculls 2000m, and women's lightweight double sculls 2000m).

=== September 2018 Summit ===
On 13 August, it was announced that a third 2018 inter-Korean summit would be held in the North Korean capital of Pyongyang in September. The meeting is designed to capitalize on what was accomplished at the previous two summits. Ri Son-gwon, the head of the North Korean delegation, told reporters that a specific date for the summit was already set, but that they wanted to "keep reporters wondering." It was announced on 31 August that Moon would send a special delegation to North Korea on 5 September to hold more nuclear talks and set up the summit. The delegation arrived in North Korea as scheduled. It was determined that the summit would be held for three days and would take place between 18 and 20 September. The summit was officially held on the scheduled dates.

== See also ==
- Inter-Korean summits
- April 2018 inter-Korean summit
- September 2018 inter-Korean summit
- 2018 North Korea–United States Singapore Summit
- North Korea–South Korea relations
- Korean reunification
- Northern Limit Line
- 2017–18 North Korea crisis
- Inter-Korean House of Freedom
- List of international trips made by Kim Jong Un
- Kim–Xi meetings
