= Unification Pavilion =

Building in the Joint Security Area

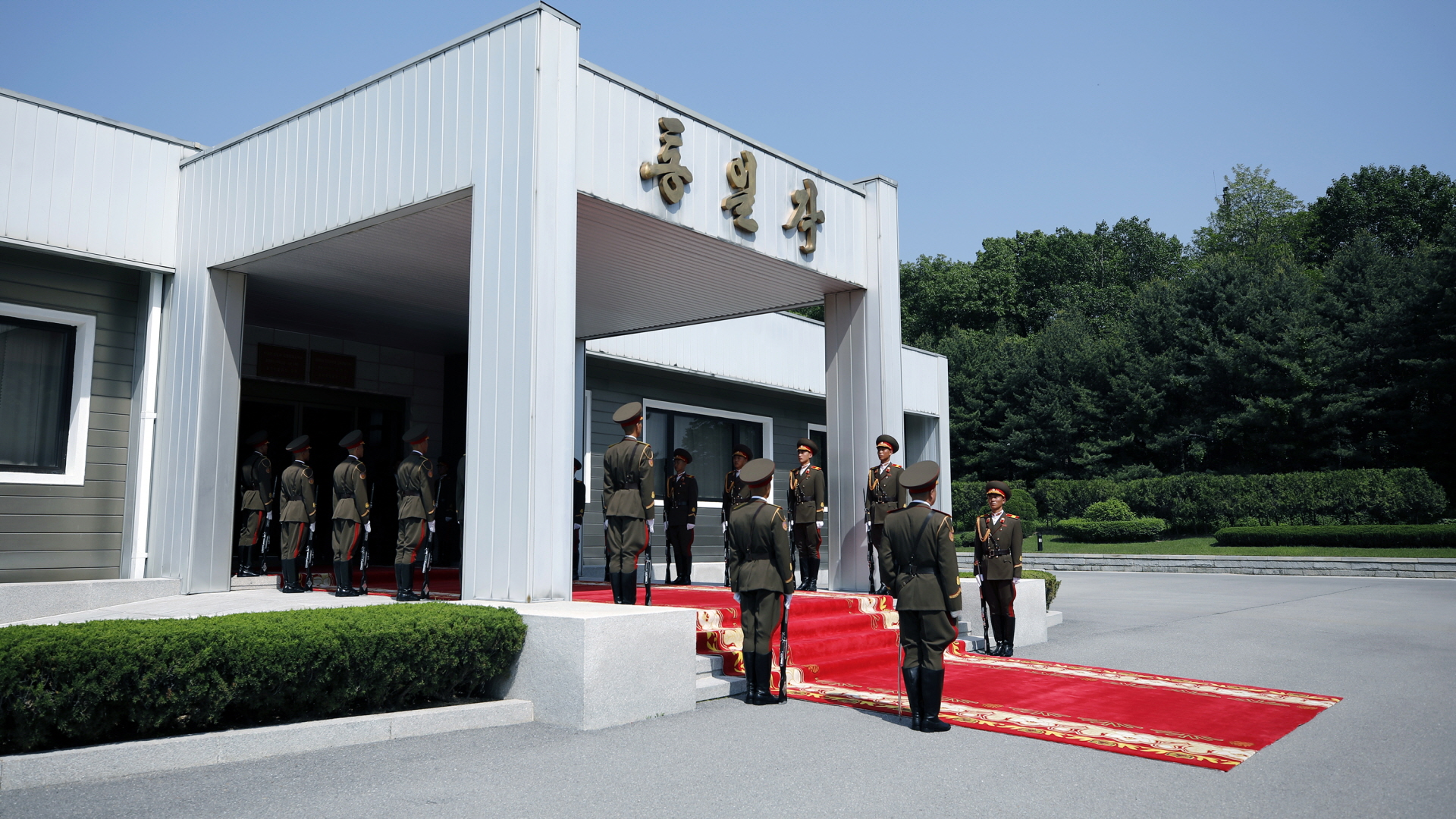

Korean name
- Hangul: 통일각
- Hanja: 統一閣
- RR: Tongilgak
- MR: T'ongilgak

The Unification Pavilion is a venue for peace talks between North and South Korea. The building is situated in the Joint Security Area on the North side of the Military Demarcation Line bisecting the area. Before the Korean War, the village, named Panmunjom, consisted of householders.

== Overview ==
Key: Red: Military Demarcation Line(MDL) Solid black: Buildings under North Korean administration Outlined Buildings: under joint U.N./South Korean administration; It is situated on the North Korean side of MDL

Situated on the North Korean side of the Military Demarcation Line is the Unification (Tongil) Pavilion, also used as a venue for non-military, diplomatic meetings. The Unification pavilion, located 80 metres (260 ft) northwest of Panmumgak, is a two-story, 1,500 square metres (16,000 sq ft) building built in 1969. Closed-circuit television and microphones are installed in the meeting room of the North-South Talks, so that the situation can be monitored in real time in Pyongyang.

A portion of the Unification Pavilion has also been used for North Korean military personnel office space.

== Events ==
- On January 9, 2018, Kwon Hyok Bong, director of the Arts and Performance Bureau in North Korea's Culture Ministry, and Hyon Song-wol, North Korea's deputy chief delegate for the talks, met with South Korean counterparts at Peace House then on January 15 at Unification pavilion to discuss inter-Korean participation in the 2018 Winter Olympics in Pyeongchang, South Korea.
- May 2018 inter-Korean summit took place on May 26.
- On August 2024, renamed "Panmungwan", also called "Panmun Hall".
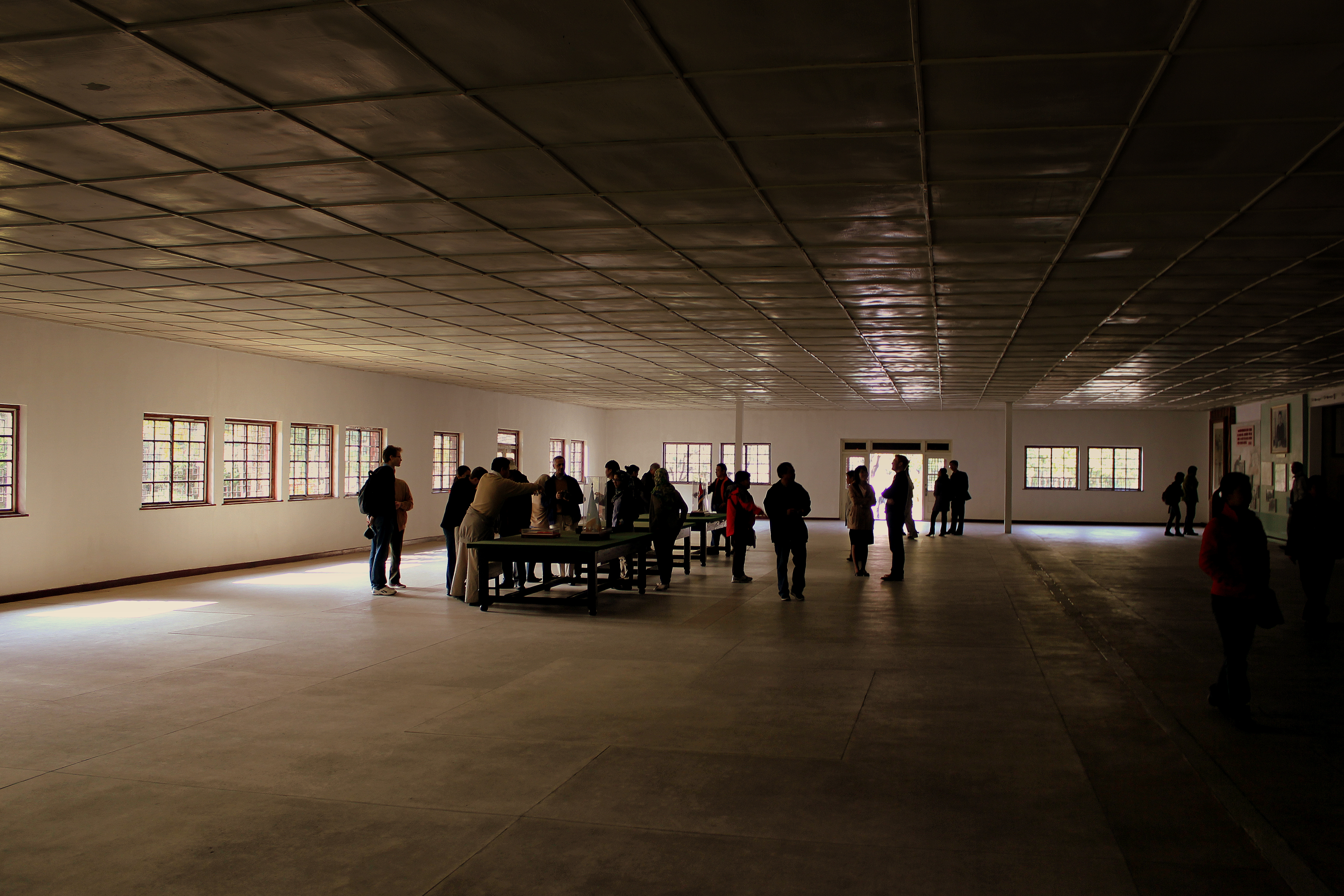
Interior of North Korean meeting building

== See also ==
- Phanmun Pavilion
- Inter-Korean Peace House
- Inter-Korean House of Freedom
- Sunshine Policy
- Northern Limit Line
- April 2018 inter-Korean summit
- May 2018 inter-Korean summit
