= Phanmun Pavilion =

Building in the Korean Joint Security Area

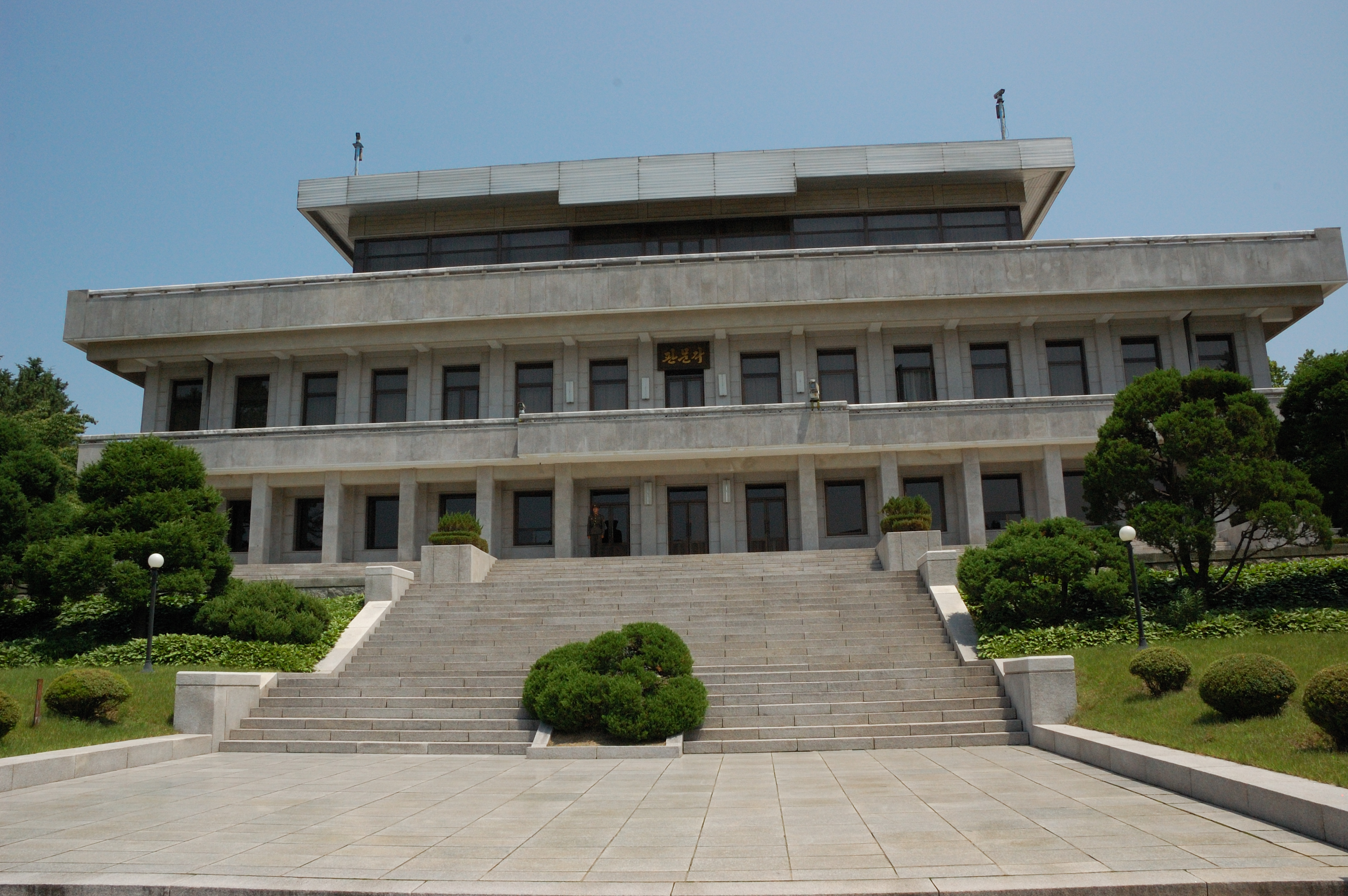

Korean name
- Hangul: 판문각
- Hanja: 板門閣
- RR: Panmungak
- MR: P'anmun'gak

Map of the Joint Security Area in Panmunjom. The Phanmun Pavilion is shown on the map as "Panmon Hall" Legend: * Red: Military Demarcation Line (MDL) * Solid black: Buildings under North Korean administration * Outlined buildings: under joint U.N./South Korean administration

The Phanmun Pavilion is a North Korean building located in the northern part of the Joint Security Area in Panmunjom. Built in September 1969, the building functions as North Korea's equivalent to the House of Freedom which is located 80 metres (260 ft) to the south, on the South Korean side of the Military Demarcation Line (MDL).

In April 2018, Kim Jong-un was seen leaving the Phanmun Pavilion as he headed towards the MDL for his summit meeting with Moon Jae-in.

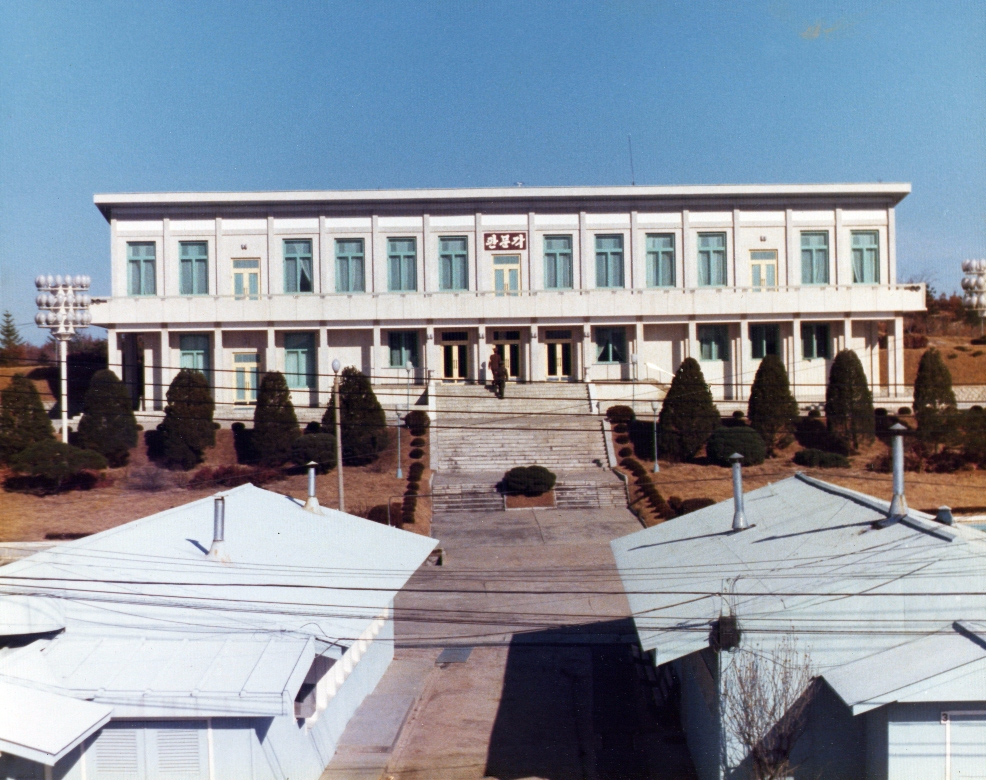
A 1976 photo of the building

A 1998 photo of a truck in front of Phanmun Pavilion. The truck was part of a 50 truck caravan carrying 501 heads of cattle, which were a gift from Hyundai founder Chung Ju-yung to North Korea.

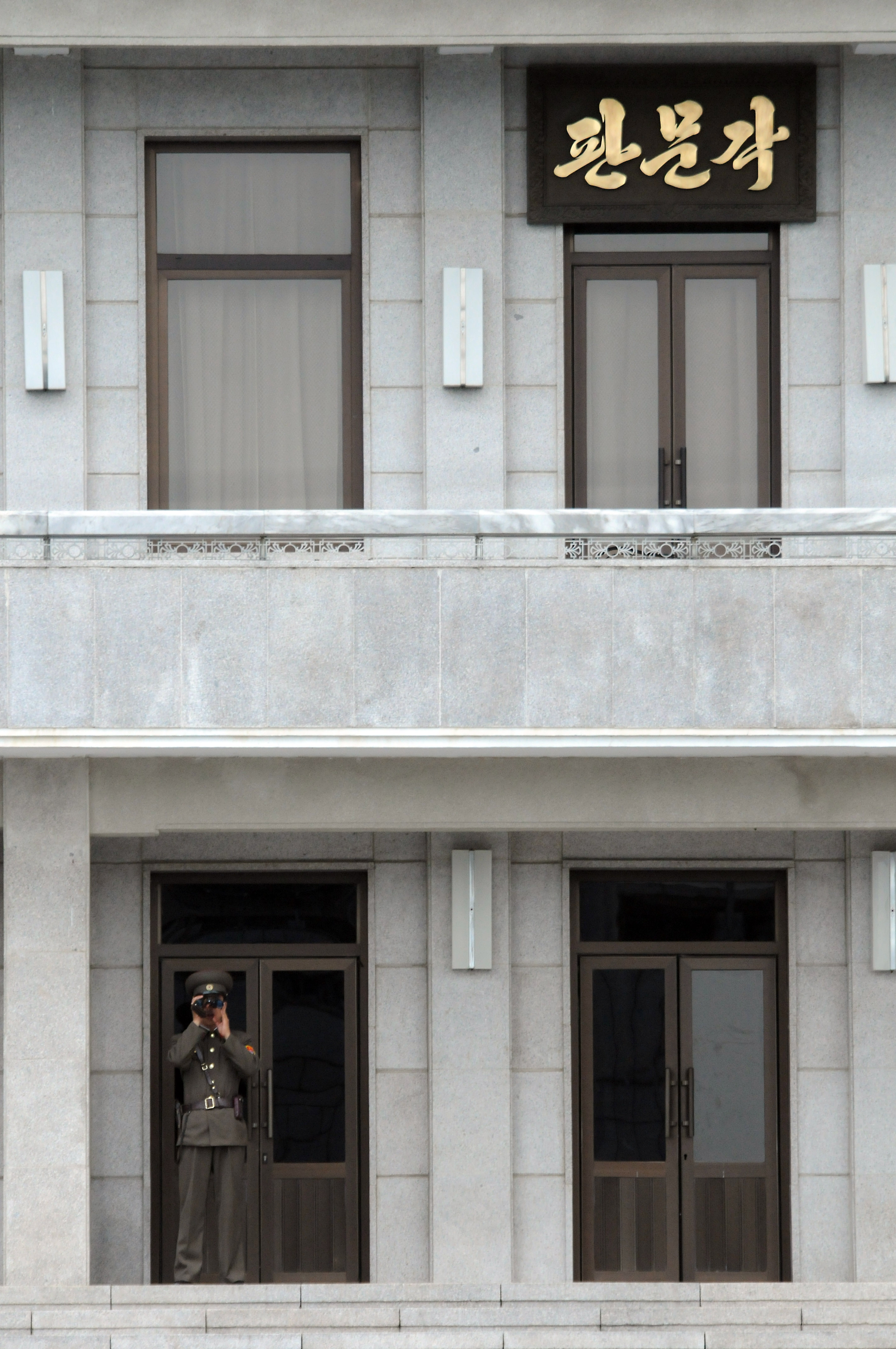
A 2008 closeup of the sign hanging outside the 2nd floor of the building. A North Korean soldier is seen guarding the first floor entrance.

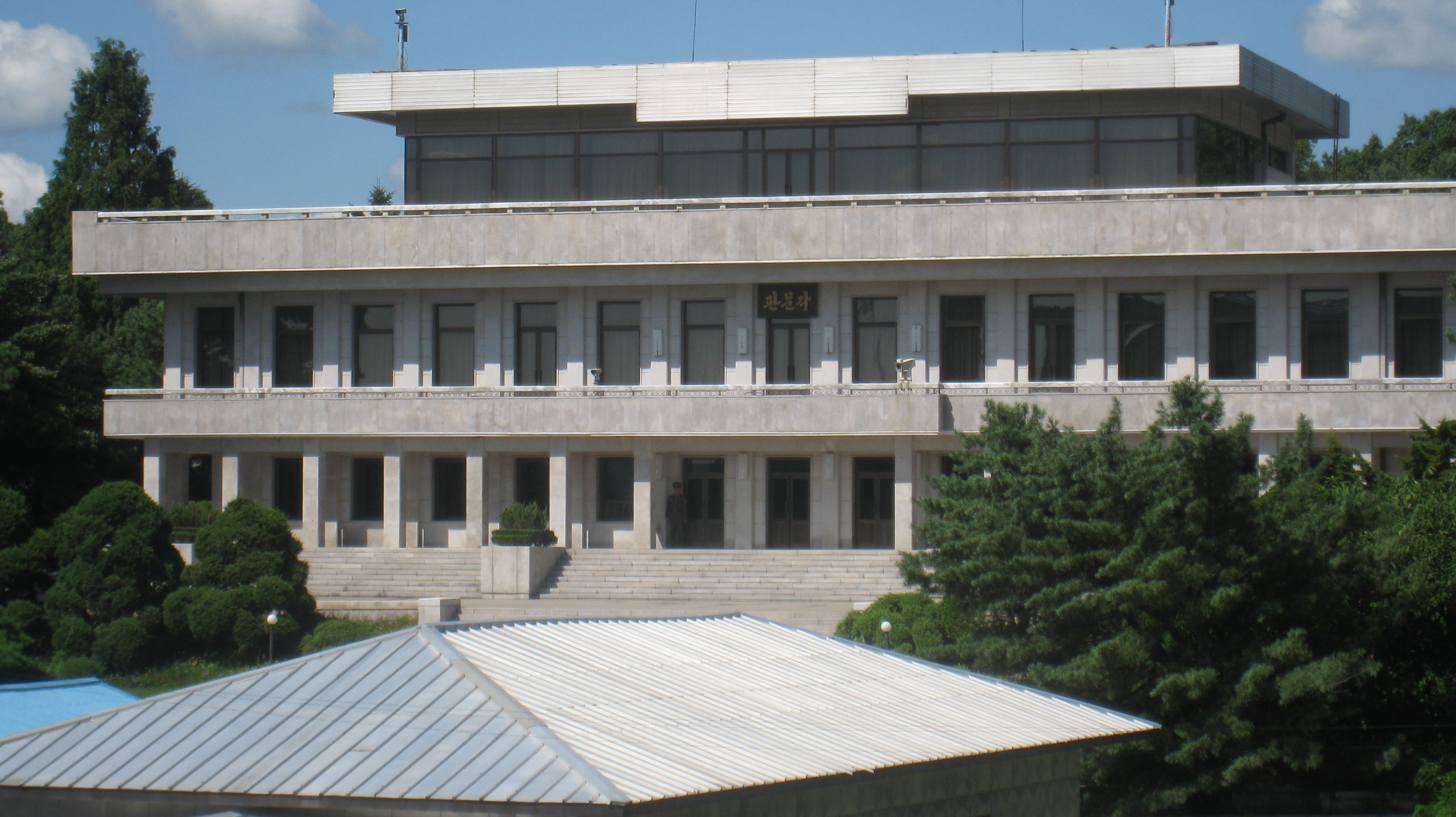
A 2009 photo of the building

== See also ==
- Unification Pavilion
- Inter-Korean House of Freedom
- Inter-Korean Peace House
- April 2018 inter-Korean summit
