= Peter Tetteroo =

Dutch journalist and filmmaker (born 1963)

Peter Tetteroo (born 1963) is a Dutch journalist and filmmaker.

Tetteroo has worked as a senior director for world wide broadcasters since 1987.

He has travelled to many countries in Europe, North and South America, Africa, Asia and Australia. Tetteroo has received international awards for reports made throughout the world.

In 2001 he received the International Emmy of the National Academy of Television Arts and Sciences in New York City, for a documentary, Welcome to North Korea.

He frequently writes about politics and international relations for newspapers and magazines.

== Filmography ==
Documentary and Short films

- The Fall of the Berlin Wall (KRO, 1989)
- Frontline Hospital (KRO, 1993)
- Saddams Sons in Law (KRO, 1996)
- Missing – Bosnia and Herzegovina (KRO, 1997)
- Spartak Moscow, the story behind it (AVRO, 1998)
- Welcome to North Korea (KRO, 2001)
- Letters from Jilava (AVRO, 2003)
- Baghdad Shrine (AVRO, 2003)
- Israeli Fighter Pilots (KRO, 2004)
- The Single Leg Amputee Sports Club (KRO, 2005)
- Journey into the Unknown (Tetteroo Media, 2006)
- The Death of Obbe Terpstra (Tetteroo Media, 2007)
- The Comfort Zone (Tetteroo Media, 2007)
- Micro Insurance in Practice (Tetteroo Media, 2008)
- Growing up in Juarez (Tetteroo Media, 2010)
- Campaign Doctors Without Borders (Lemz, 2010)
- How to become a president (Lokaal Mondiaal, 2010)

== Awards ==
- Banff World Television Festival, Best Documentary (1995)
- Monte-Carlo Television Festival, Silver Dove (1998)
- National Academy of Television Arts and Sciences, Best International Documentary (2001)
- Dutch Academy Awards, Best Documentary (2001)
- Dutch Academy Awards, Best Documentary (2003)
