= Peace House =

Building in the Korean Joint Security Area

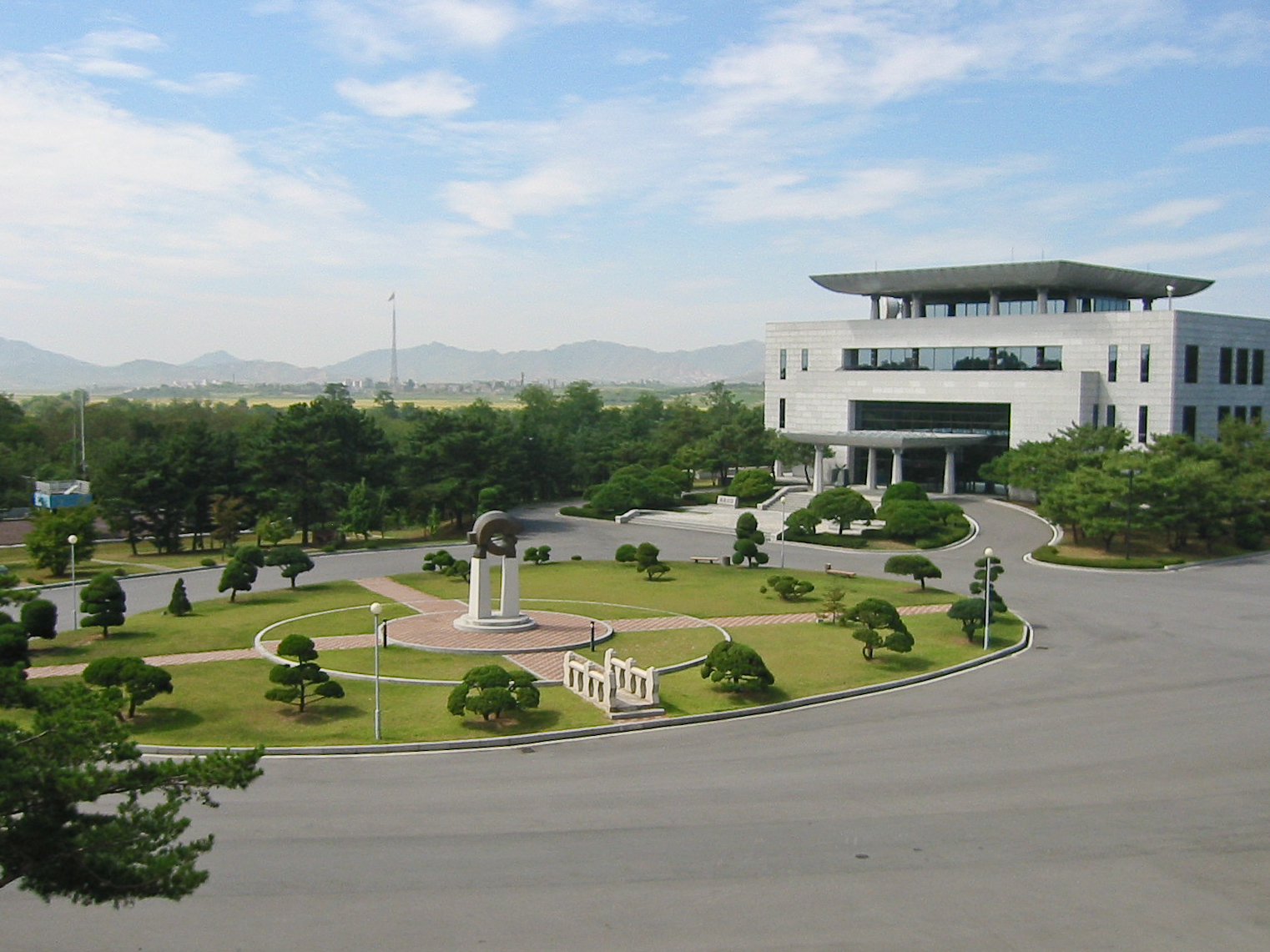
- The Peace House, as seen from the House of Freedom, with the Sunken Garden in the foreground.

Korean name
- Hangul: 평화의 집
- Hanja: 平和의 집
- RR: Pyeonghwaui jip
- MR: P'yŏnghwaŭi chip

The Peace House (House of Peace or Home of Peace) is a venue for peace talks between North and South Korea. The building is situated in the Joint Security Area on the south side of the Military Demarcation Line bisecting the area. It is under the jurisdiction of the United Nations Command.

Map of the Joint Security Area in Panmunjom. The Peace House is shown on the map as "Home of Peace" Military Demarcation Line Buildings under North Korean administration Under joint U.N./South Korean administration

The Peace House is a three-story building whose construction completed on December 19, 1989. The floor layout, which adds up to 998 square metres (10,740 sq ft), is as follows:

- First floor: a pair of rooms used mainly for press conferences and lower-level meetings.
- Second floor: dedicated, for the most part, to an elaborate conference room
- Third floor: two rooms, one dedicated for luncheons and dinners

The building is intended for non-military purposes, with the most notable usage being the April 2018 inter-Korean summit.

The building is equipped with closed-circuit television and microphones, allowing real time audio and video monitoring of the facility at the South Korean presidential office in Seoul.

== Notable usages ==
The building has served as a venue for the following events:

- August 25, 2015: Kim Kwan-jin, South Korea's Chief of National Security Council, and Hong Yong-pyo, South Korea's Minister of Unification, met with Hwang Pyong-so, Vice Chairman of the Central Military Commission of North Korea's Workers' Party, and Kim Yang Gon, a senior official of the Workers' Party of Korea.
- January 15, 2018, Kwon Hyok Bong, director of the Arts and Performance Bureau in North Korea's Culture Ministry, and Hyon Song-wol, North Korea's deputy chief delegate for the talks, met with their South Korean counterparts to discuss inter-Korean participation in the 2018 Winter Olympics.
- April 27, 2018: April 2018 inter-Korean summit

== See also ==
- House of Freedom
- Phanmun Pavilion
- Sunshine Policy
- Northern Limit Line
