= House of Freedom =

Building in the Korean Joint Security Area

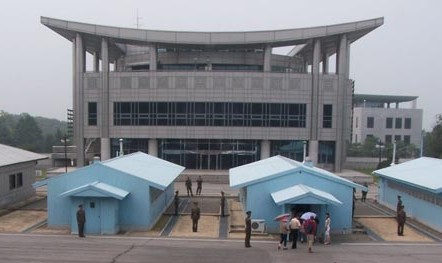
- The House of Freedom (the building behind the blue cabins), as seen from Phanmun Pavilion on the North Korean side of the boundary (which runs half way along the length of the blue cabins). The Peace House can be seen on the right, in the background.
- Interactive map of the House of Freedom area

General information
- Completed: 9 July 1998 (rebuilt)

Technical details
- Floor count: 4

Korean name
- Hangul: 자유의 집
- Hanja: 自由의 집
- RR: Jayuui jip
- MR: Chayuŭi chip

Map of the Joint Security Area in Panmunjom. The House of Freedom is shown on the map as "Home of Freedom" Military Demarcation Line Buildings under North Korean administration Buildings under joint U.N./South Korean administration

The House of Freedom (Korean: 자유의 집) is a four-story building located in the southern part of Panmunjom (Joint Security Area). It stands opposite to its North Korean equivalent, the Phanmun Pavilion. It is located 130 metres (430 ft) southwest of the Peace House in the south of Panmunjom. The Inter-Korean House of Freedom was rebuilt on 9 July 1998 after demolition of the old house of freedom. The building served as the venue for a one hour meeting between Donald Trump and Kim Jong-un as part of the 2019 Koreas–United States DMZ Summit.

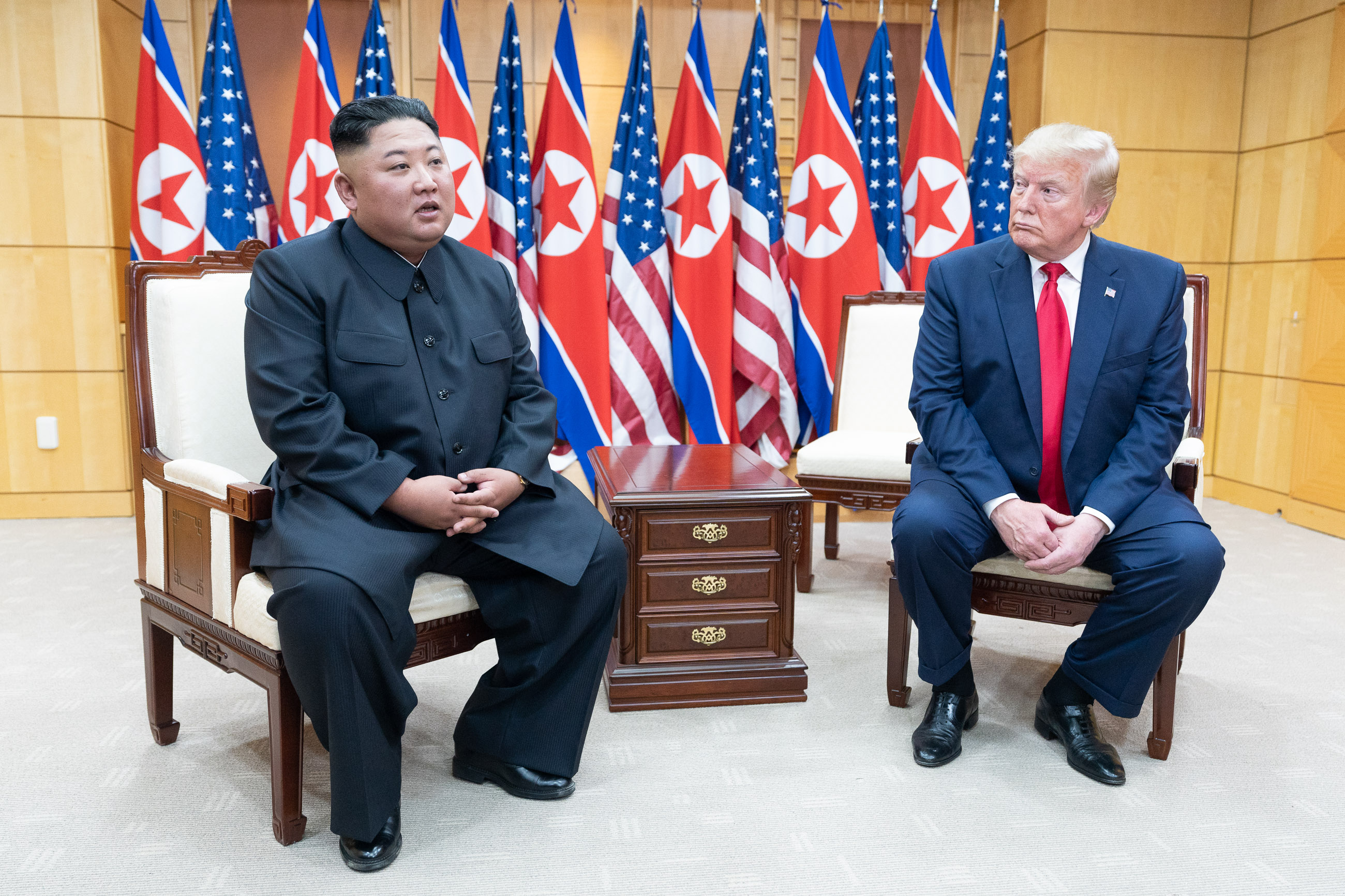
President Trump and Chairman Kim speaking to reporters following a meeting at the Inter-Korean House of Freedom. The meeting was part of the 2019 Koreas–United States DMZ Summit

== See also ==
- Phanmun Pavilion
- Inter-Korean summits
- Peace House
