= Hotline =

Automatically directed point-to-point communications link

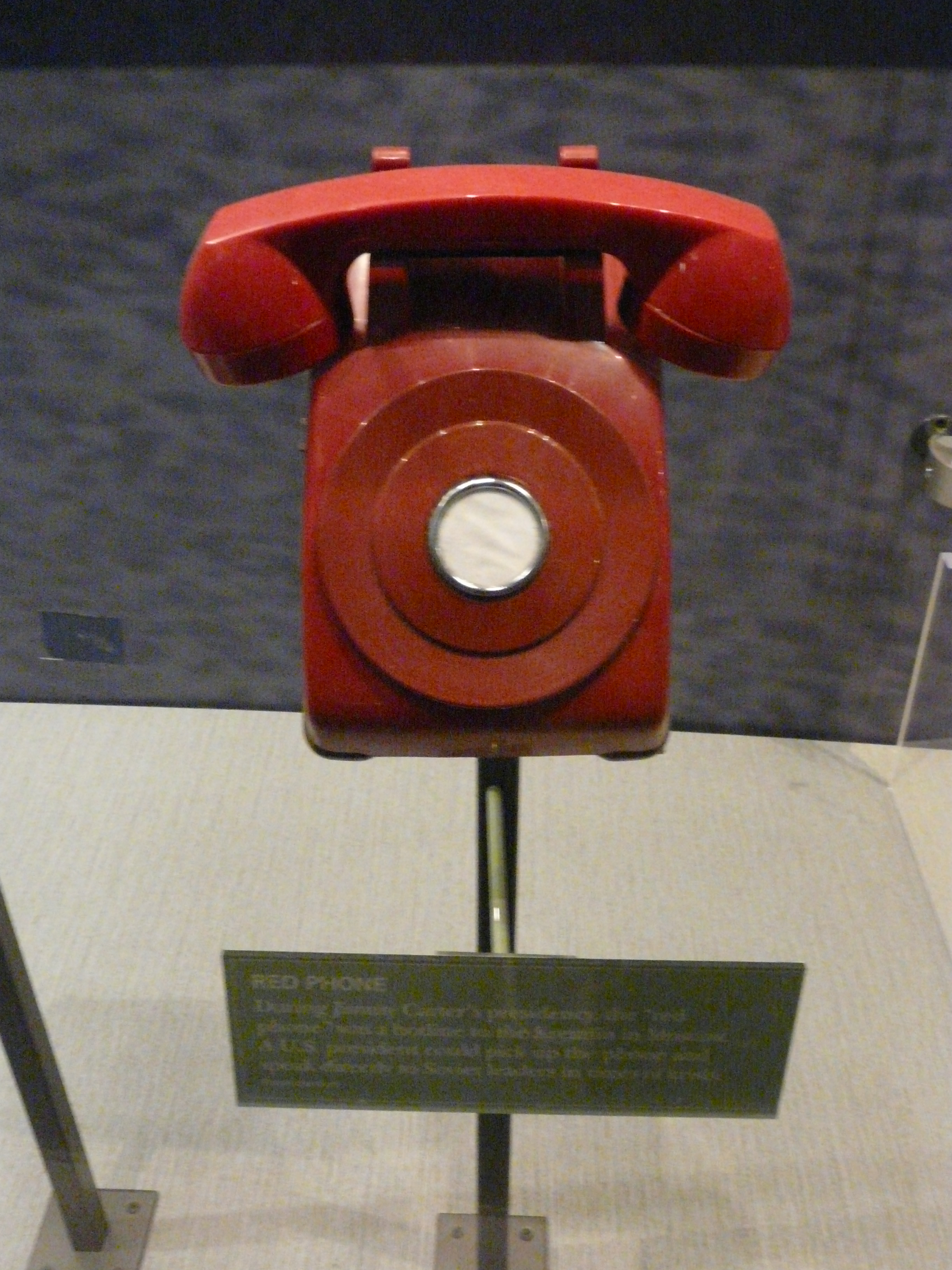
A typical non-dial red phone used for hotlines. This one is a prop which is on display in the Jimmy Carter Library and Museum, erroneously representing the Moscow–Washington hotline.

A hotline is a point-to-point communications link in which a call is automatically directed to the preselected destination without any additional action by the user when the end instrument goes off-hook. An example would be a phone that automatically connects to emergency services on picking up the receiver. Therefore, dedicated hotline phones do not need a rotary dial or keypad. A hotline can also be called an automatic signaling, ringdown, or off-hook service.

== For crises and service ==
True hotlines cannot be used to originate calls other than to preselected destinations. However, in common or colloquial usage, a "hotline" often refers to a call center reachable by dialing a standard telephone number, or sometimes the phone numbers themselves.

This is especially the case with 24-hour, noncommercial numbers, such as police tip hotlines or suicide crisis hotlines, which are staffed around the clock and thereby give the appearance of real hotlines. Increasingly, however, the term is found being applied to any customer service telephone number.

== Between states ==
=== Russia–United States ===
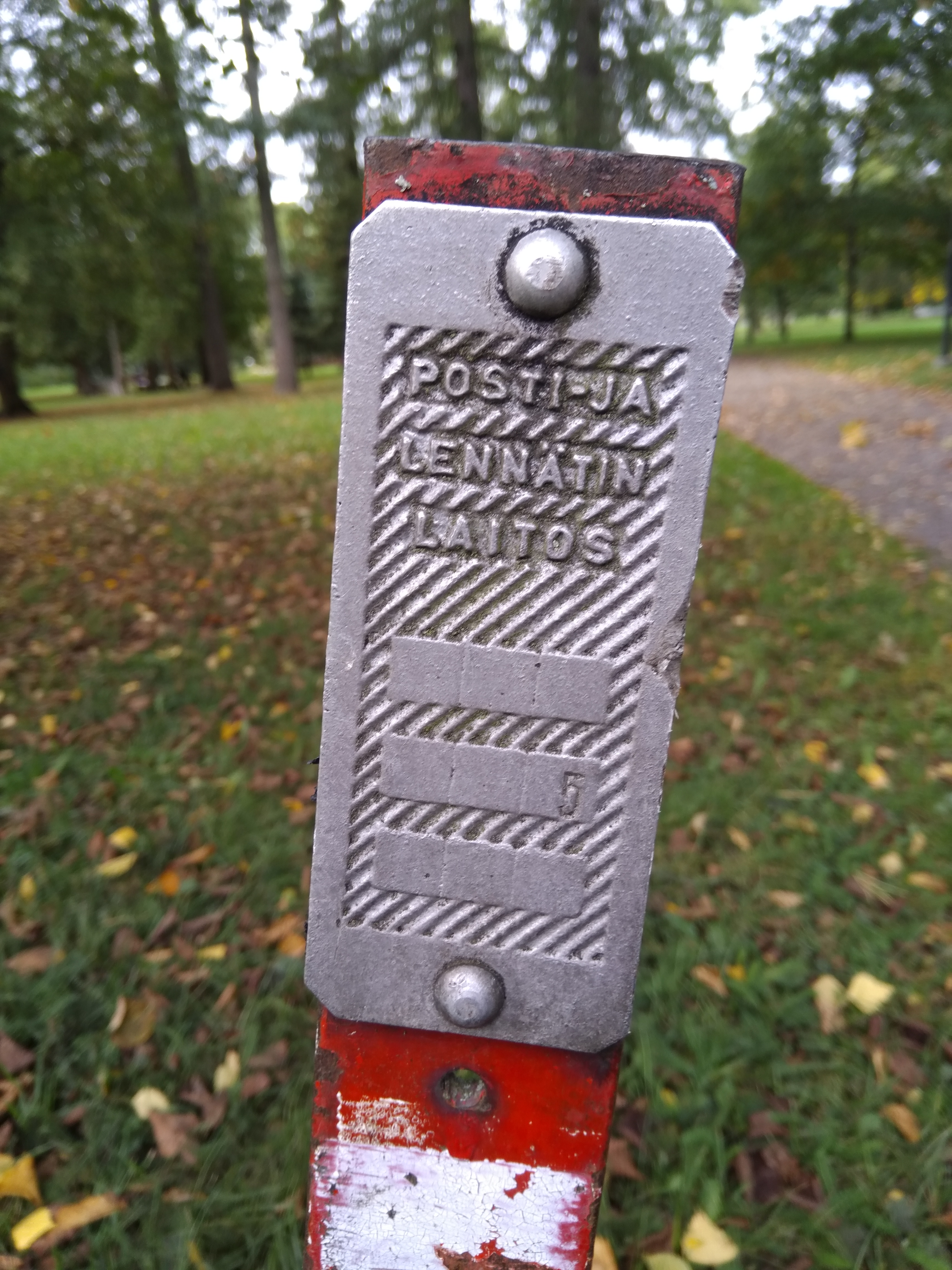
In Finland there are still several signs marking the location of the Moscow–Washington hotline cable. This one is in Forssa. The text reads "Post and telegraph department".

The most famous hotline between states is the Moscow–Washington hotline, also known as the "red telephone", although telephones have never been used in this capacity. This direct communications link was established on 20 June 1963, in the wake of the Cuban Missile Crisis, which convinced both sides of the need for better communications. It was used for the first time by U.S. President John F. Kennedy on 30 August 1963 and utilized teletypewriter technology, later replaced by telecopier and then by electronic mail.

=== United Kingdom–United States ===
During World War II—two decades before the Washington–Moscow hotline was established—there was a hotline between No. 10 Downing Street, the Cabinet War Room bunker under the Treasury, Whitehall, and the White House in Washington, D.C. From 1943 to 1946, this link was made secure by using the first voice encryption machine, called SIGSALY.

=== China–Russia ===
A hotline connection between Beijing and Moscow was used during the 1969 frontier confrontation between the two countries. The Chinese refused the Russian peace attempts and ended the communications link. After a reconciliation between the two countries, the hotline between China and Russia was revived in 1996.

=== France–Russia ===
On his visit to the Soviet Union in 1966, French President Charles de Gaulle announced that a hotline would be established between Paris and Moscow. The line was upgraded from a telex to a high-speed fax machine in 1989.

=== Russia–United Kingdom ===
A London–Moscow hotline was not formally established until a treaty of friendship between the two countries in 1992. An upgrade was announced when Foreign Secretary William Hague visited Moscow in 2011.

=== India–Pakistan ===
On 20 June 2004, both India and Pakistan agreed to extend a nuclear testing ban and to set up an Islamabad–New Delhi hotline between their foreign secretaries aimed at preventing misunderstandings that might lead to nuclear war.

=== China–United States ===
The United States and China set up a defense hotline in 2008, but it has rarely been used in crises.

=== China–India ===
India and China announced a hotline for the foreign ministers of both countries while reiterating their commitment to strengthening ties and building "mutual political trust". As of August 2015 the hotline was yet to be made operational.

=== China–Japan ===
In February 2013, the Senkaku Islands dispute gave renewed impetus to a China–Japan hotline, which had been agreed to but due to rising tensions had not been established.

=== North and South Korea ===
Between North and South Korea there are over 40 direct phone lines, the first of which was opened in September 1971. Most of these hotlines run through the Panmunjeom Joint Security Area (JSA) and are maintained by the Red Cross. Since 1971, North Korea has deactivated the hotlines seven times, the last time in February 2016. After Kim Jong-un's New Years address, the border hotline was reopened on 3 January 2018.

=== India–United States ===
In August 2015 the hotline between the White House and New Delhi became operational. The decision of establishing this hotline was taken during President Barack Obama's visit to India in January 2015. This is the first hotline connecting an Indian Prime Minister to a head of state.

== See also ==
- Bat phone
- Complaint system
