= Yong-ho =

- Hangul: 용호
- RR: Yongho
- MR: Yongho

Yong-ho is a Korean given name.

People with this name include:

== Politics and government ==
- Paek Yong-ho (born 1945), North Korean politician, General Secretary to the Central Committee of the Red Cross Society of North Korea
- Cho Yong-Ho (born 1955), South Korean judge
- Ri Yong-ho (politician) (born 1956), North Korean diplomat, Minister of Foreign Affairs since May 2016

== Sport ==
- Jang Yong-ho (born 1976), South Korean archer
- Park Yong-ho (born 1981), South Korean football centre-back (K League 1)
- Yoon Yong-ho (born 1996), South Korean football midfielder (K League 1)

== Other ==
- Francis Hong Yong-ho (1906–?), Korean Roman Catholic priest disappeared by North Korea in 1949

== See also ==
- List of Korean given names
- Thae Yong-ho (태영호; born 1962), North Korean diplomat who defected to South Korea in 2016
- Younghoe Koo (구영회; born 1994) South Korean-born American football player
