= Moscow–Washington hotline =

Communication system between Russia and the US

- Washington–Moscow Direct Communications Link
- Near Washington, D.C. and Moscow in United States and Russian Federation (formerly Soviet Union)
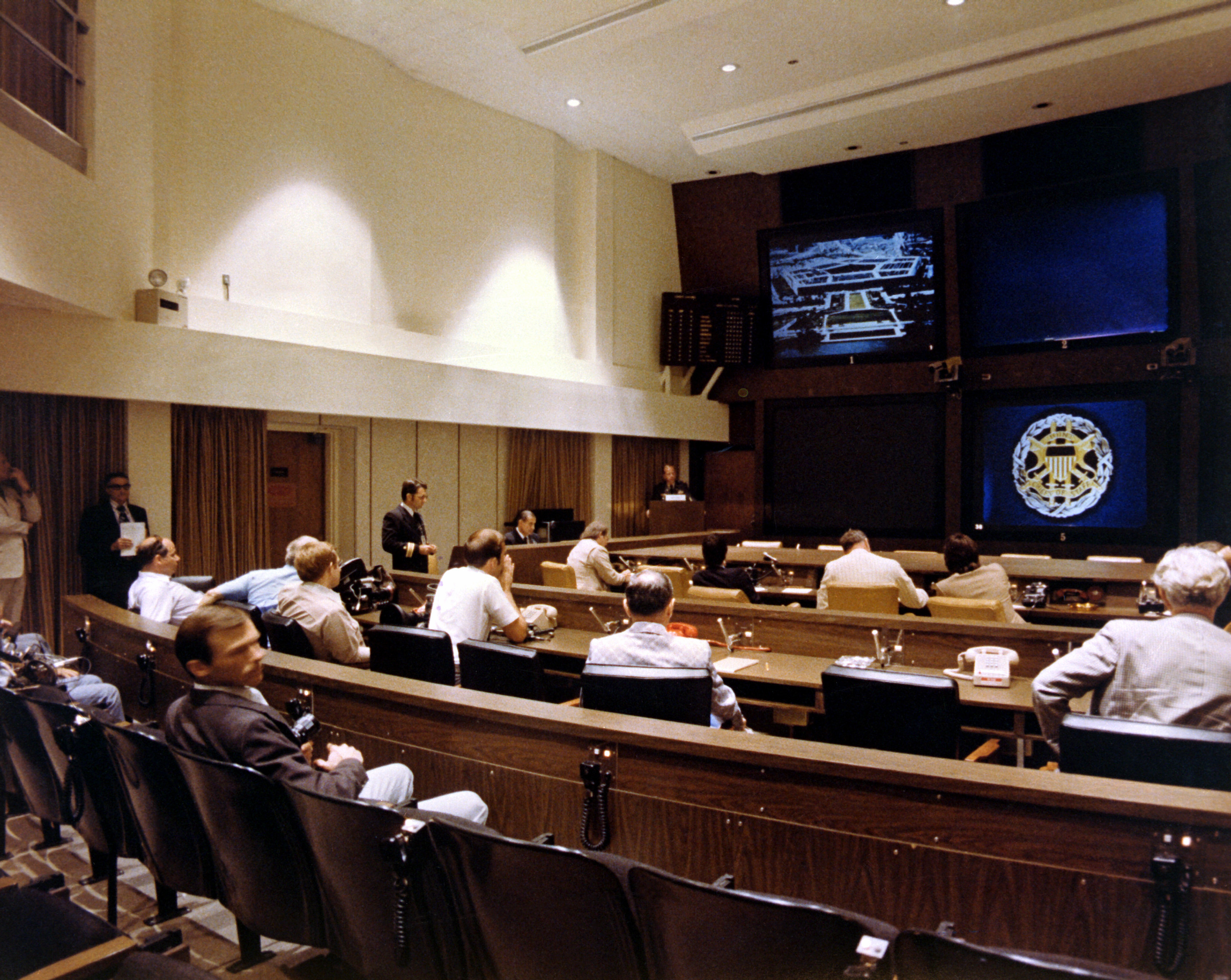
- The National Military Command Center at the Pentagon, 1976

Site information
- Type: Direct strategic communications link

Site history
- Battles/wars: Used during the Six-Day War, Yom Kippur War, and the Soviet–Afghan War

Garrison information
- Current commander: Shared control between the U.S. DoD and the Russian Ministry of Defence
- Occupants: Defense Information Systems Agency (US operation)

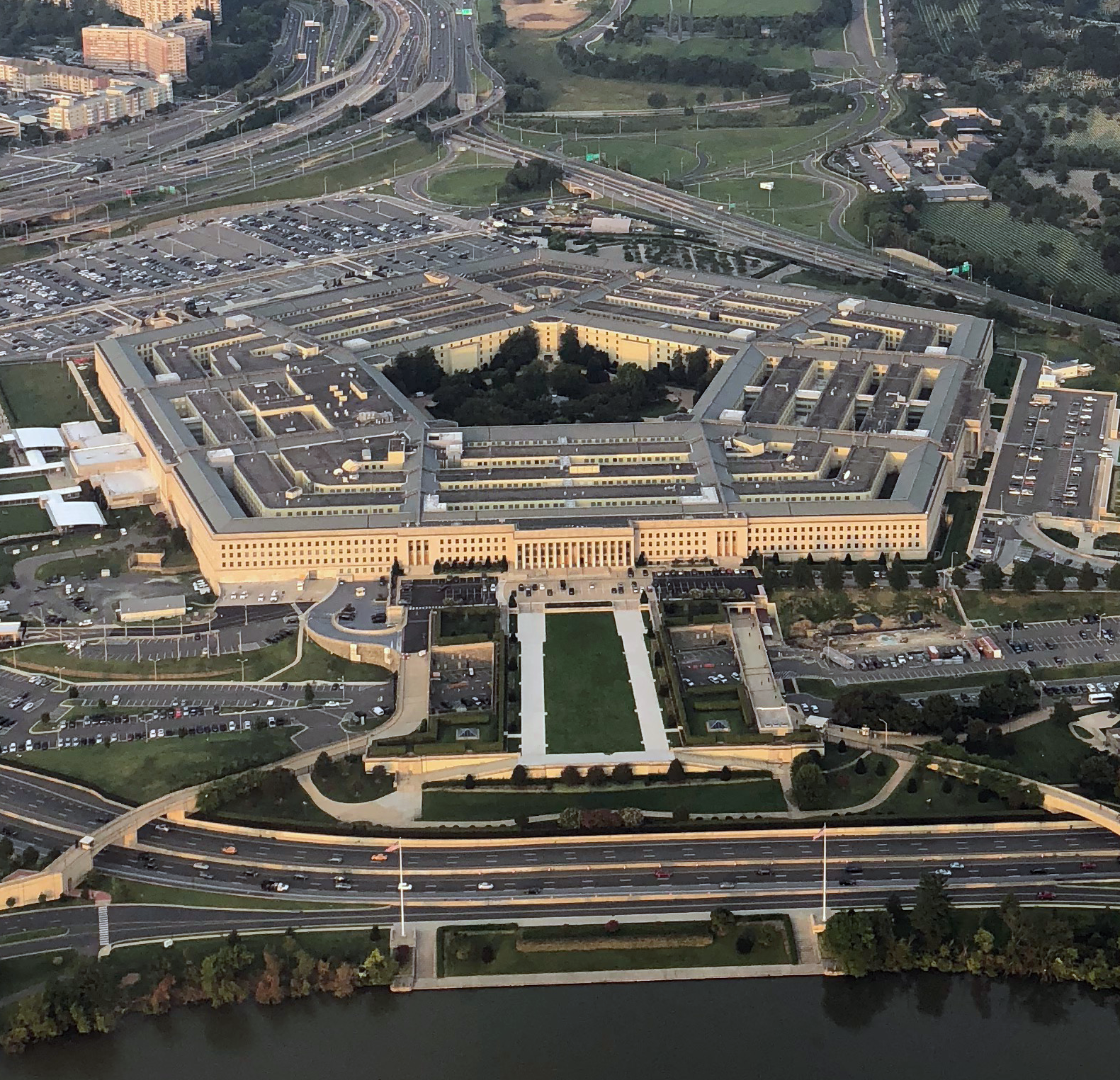
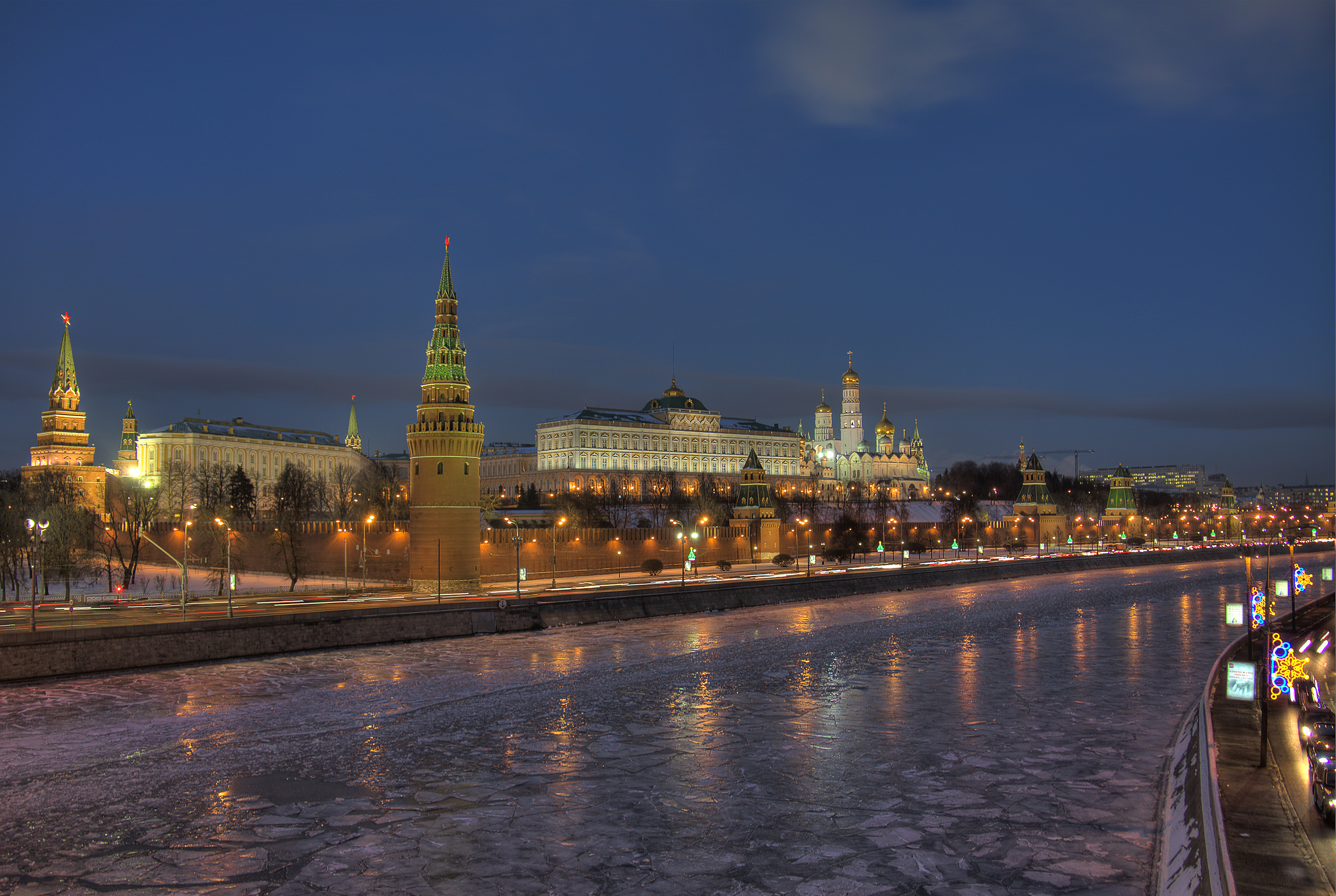
The Pentagon in Arlington County, Virginia, U.S. (left) and the Kremlin in Moscow, Russia (right). These two facilities are linked by the hotline.

The Moscow–Washington hotline (formally known in the United States as the Washington–Moscow Direct Communications Link; Russian: Горячая линия Вашингтон – Москва, romanized: Goryachaya liniya Vashington–Moskva) is a system that allows direct communication between the leaders of the United States and the Russian Federation (formerly the Soviet Union). This hotline was established in 1963 and links the Pentagon with the Kremlin (historically, with Soviet Communist Party leadership across the square from the Kremlin itself). Although in popular culture it is known as the "red telephone", the hotline was never a telephone line, and no red phones were used. The first implementation used Teletype equipment, and shifted to fax machines in 1986. Since 2008, the Moscow–Washington hotline has been a secure computer link over which messages are exchanged by a secure form of email.

== Origins ==
=== Background ===
Several people came up with the idea for a hotline, including Harvard professor Thomas Schelling, who had worked on nuclear war policy for the Defense Department previously. Schelling credited the pop fiction novel Red Alert (the basis of the film Dr. Strangelove) with making governments more aware of the benefit of direct communication between the superpowers. In addition, Parade editor Jess Gorkin personally badgered 1960 presidential candidates John F. Kennedy and Richard Nixon, and buttonholed the Soviet premier Nikita Khrushchev during a U.S. visit, to adopt the idea. During this period Gerard C. Smith, as head of the State Department Policy Planning Staff, proposed direct communication links between Moscow and Washington. Objections from others in the State Department, the U.S. military, and the Kremlin delayed introduction.

The 1962 Cuban Missile Crisis made the hotline a priority. During the standoff, official diplomatic messages typically took six hours to deliver; unofficial channels, such as via television network correspondents, had to be used too as they were quicker. The experience of the crisis convinced both sides of the need for better communications.

During the crisis, the United States took nearly twelve hours to receive and decode Nikita Khrushchev's 3,000-word-initial settlement message – a dangerously long time. By the time Washington had drafted a reply, a tougher message from Moscow had been received, demanding that U.S. missiles be removed from Turkey. White House advisers thought faster communications could have averted the crisis, and resolved it quickly. The two countries signed the Hot Line Agreement on June 20, 1963 – the first time they formally took action to cut the risk of starting a nuclear war unintentionally.

Installed on August 30, 1963, it was first used in 1967 by President Lyndon B. Johnson during the Six-Day War.

=== Agreement ===
The "hotline", as it would come to be known, was established after the signing of a "Memorandum of Understanding Regarding the Establishment of a Direct Communications Line" on June 20, 1963, in Geneva, Switzerland, by representatives of the Soviet Union and the United States.

== Political criticism ==
The Republican Party criticized the hotline in its 1964 national platform; it said the Kennedy administration had "sought accommodations with Communism without adequate safeguards and compensating gains for freedom. It has alienated proven allies by opening a 'hot line' first with a sworn enemy rather than with a proven friend, and in general pursued a risky path such as began at Munich a quarter of a century ago."

== Technology and procedure ==
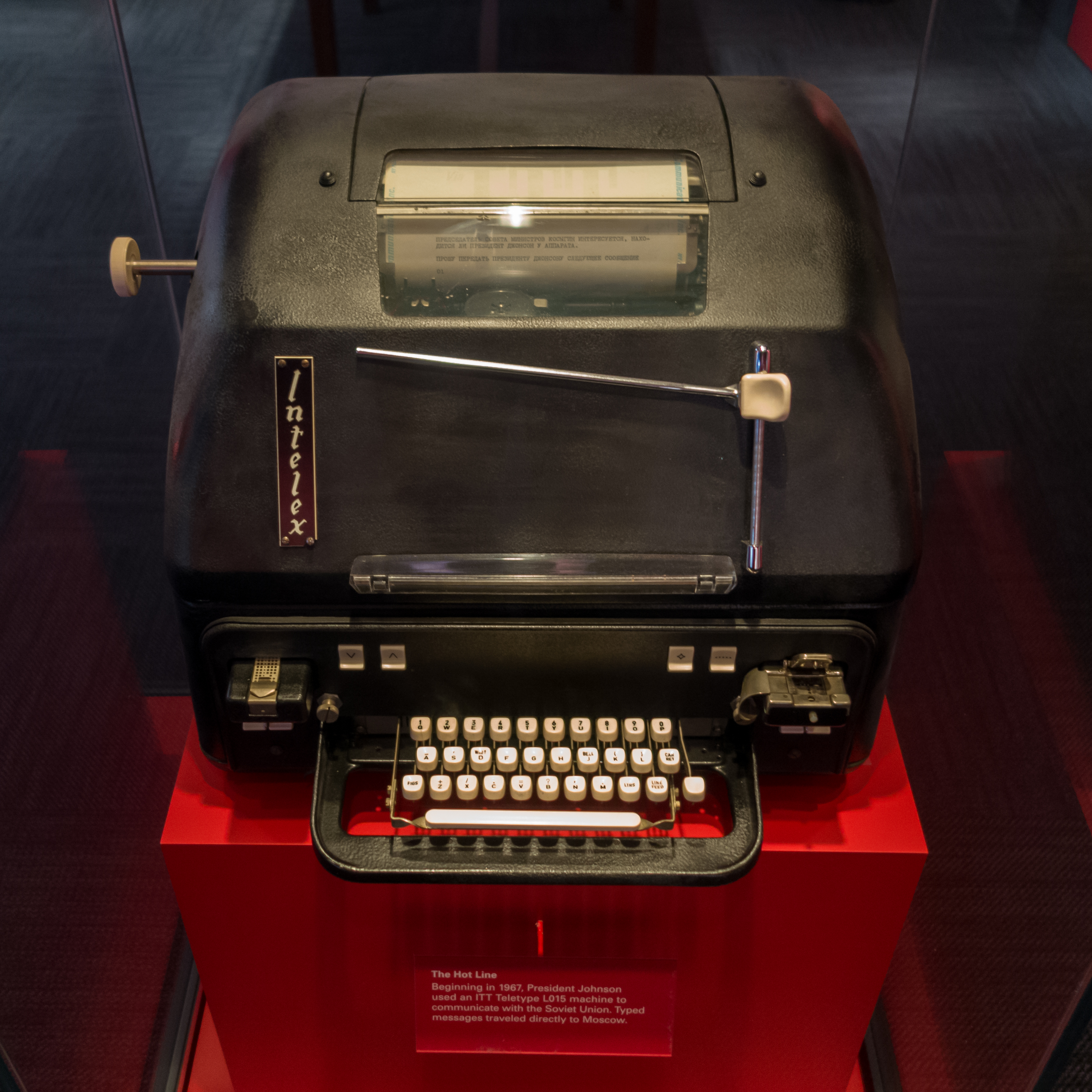
ITT Intelex Teletype L015, as displayed in the Lyndon Baines Johnson Library and Museum.

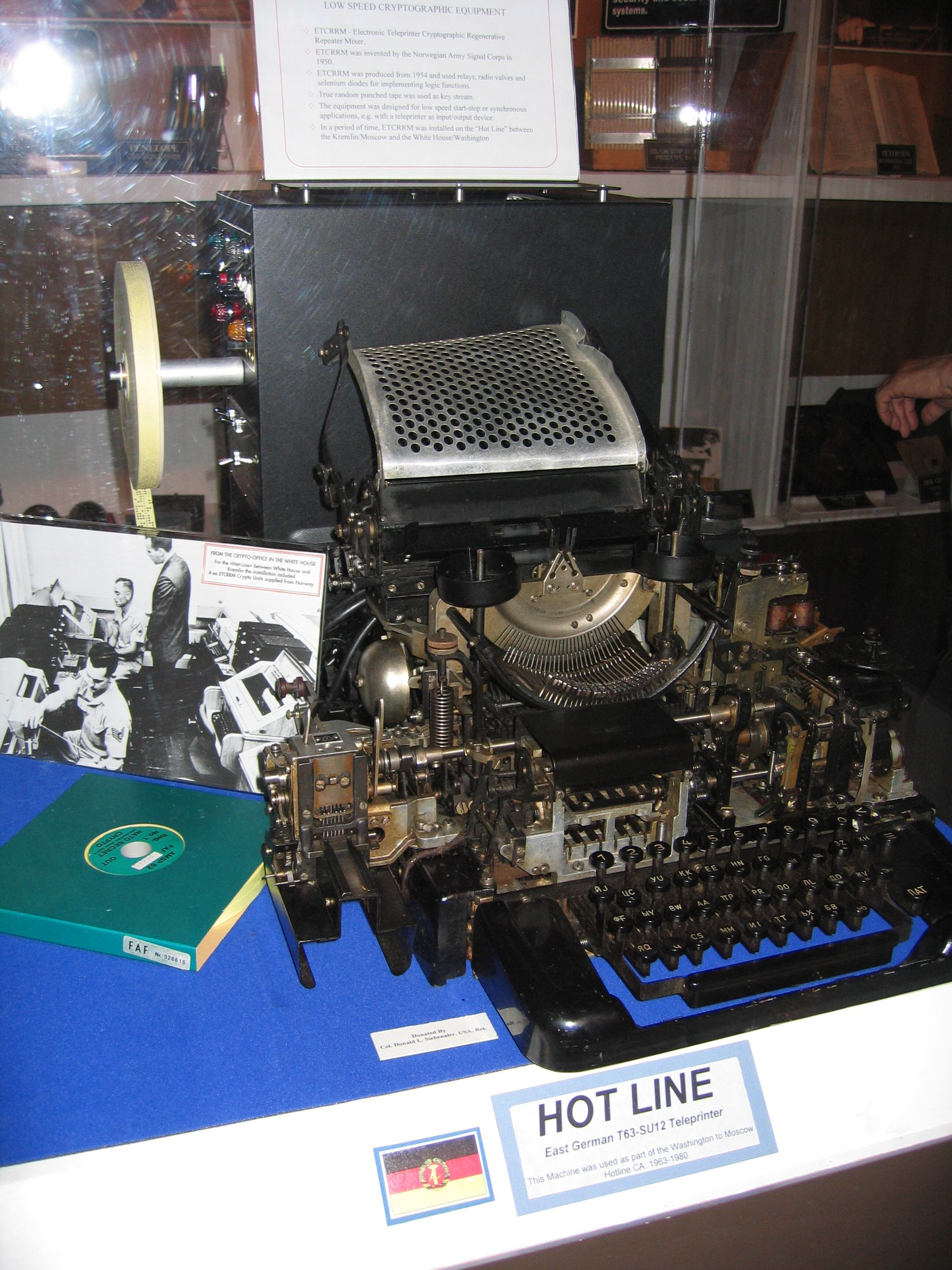
An East German T63-SU12 teleprinter from the hotline, as displayed in the National Cryptologic Museum of the NSA. The black box behind the teleprinter is an ETCRRM II encryption machine.

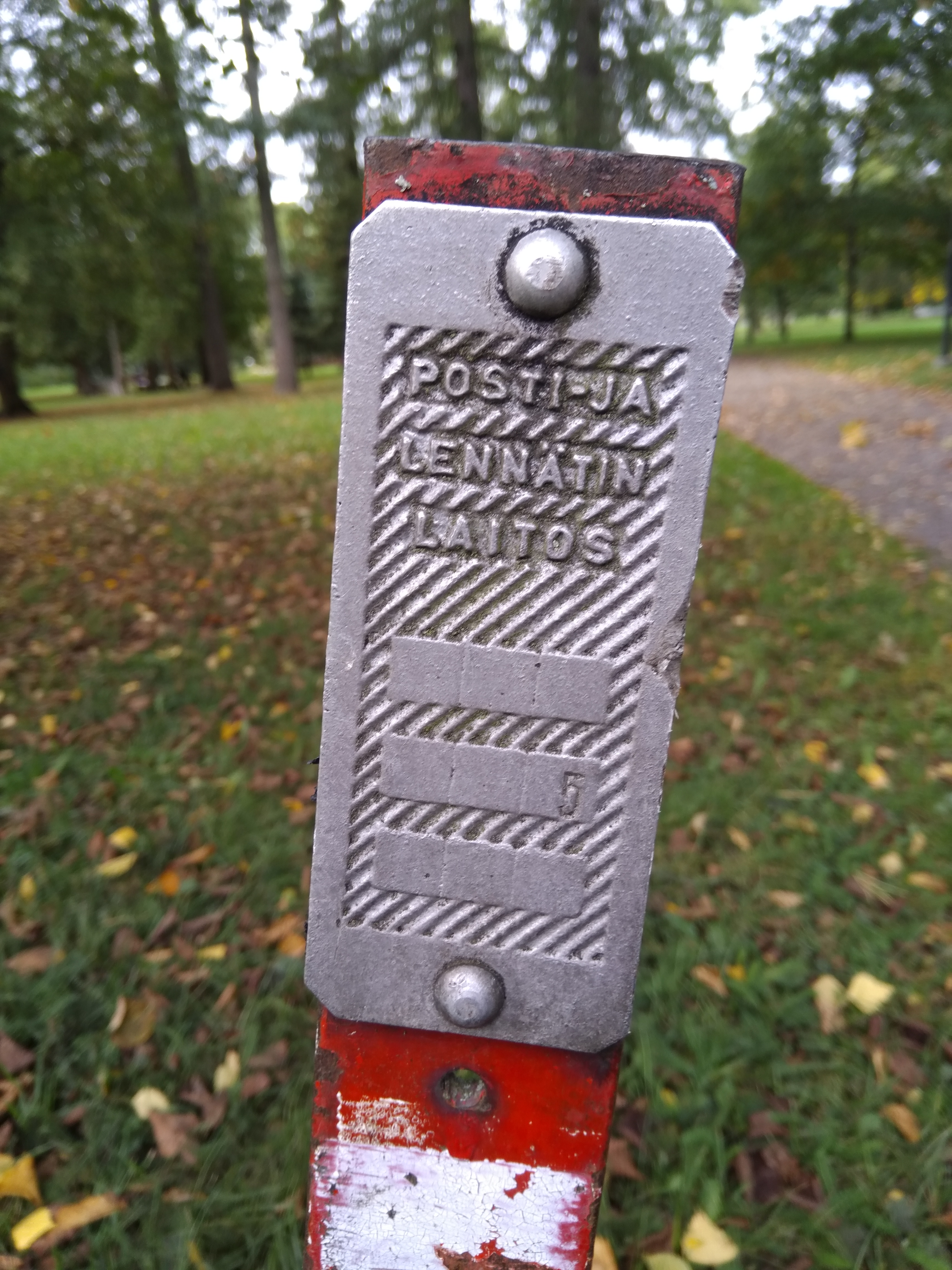
In Finland there are still several signs marking the cable's location. This one is in Forssa. The text reads "Post and telegraph department". The cable was also used for the ordinary national telephone service.

The Moscow–Washington hotline was intended for text only; speech might be misinterpreted. Leaders wrote in their native language and messages were translated at the receiving end.

=== Teletype ===
The first generation of the hotline used two full-time duplex telegraph circuits. The primary circuit was routed from Washington, D.C. via London, Copenhagen, Stockholm and Helsinki to Moscow. TAT-1, the first submarine transatlantic telephone cable, carried messages from Washington to London. A secondary radio line for back-up and service messages linked Washington and Moscow via Tangier. This network was originally built by Harris Corporation.

In July 1963 the United States sent four sets of teleprinters with the Latin alphabet to Moscow for the terminal there. A month later the Soviet equipment, four sets of East German teleprinters with the Cyrillic alphabet made by Siemens, arrived in Washington. The hotline started operations on August 30, 1963.

=== Encryption ===
A Norwegian-built device called Electronic Teleprinter Cryptographic Regenerative Repeater Mixer II (ETCRRM II) encrypted the teletype messages using a shared one-time pad. Each country delivered keying tapes used to encode its messages via its embassy abroad. An advantage of the one-time pad was that neither country had to reveal more sensitive encryption methods to the other.

=== Satellite ===
In September 1971, Moscow and Washington decided to upgrade the system. The countries also agreed for the first time when the line should be used. Specifically, they agreed to notify each other immediately in the event of an accidental, unauthorized or unexplained incident involving a nuclear weapon that could increase the risk of nuclear war. Two new satellite communication lines supplemented the terrestrial circuits using two U.S. Intelsat satellites, and two Soviet Molniya II satellites. This arrangement lasted from 1971 to 1978; it made the radio link via Tangier redundant.

=== Facsimile ===
In May 1983, President Ronald Reagan proposed to upgrade the hotline by the addition of high-speed facsimile capability. The Soviet Union and the United States agreed formally to do this on July 17, 1984.

According to the agreement, upgrades were to take place through use of Intelsat satellites and modems, facsimile machines, and computers. The facsimile terminals were operational by 1986. The teletype circuits were cut in 1988 after several years of testing and use proved the fax links to be reliable. The Soviets transferred the hotline link to the newer, geostationary Gorizont-class satellites of the Stationar system.

In 1988, the US side of the hotline system was located at the National Military Command Center in the Pentagon. Each MOLINK (Moscow Link) team worked an eight-hour shift: a non-commissioned officer looked after the equipment, and a commissioned officer who was fluent in Russian and well-briefed on world affairs was translator. The hotline was tested hourly. U.S. test messages included excerpts of William Shakespeare, Mark Twain, encyclopedias, and a first-aid manual; Soviet tests included passages from the works of Anton Chekhov. MOLINK staffers took special care not to include innuendo or literary imagery that could be misinterpreted, such as passages from Winnie the Pooh, given that a bear is considered the national symbol of Russia. The Soviets also asked, during the Carter administration, that Washington not send routine communications through the hotline.

Upon receipt of the message at the NMCC, the message was translated into English, and both the original Russian and the translated English texts were transmitted to the White House Situation Room. However, if the message were to indicate "an imminent disaster, such as an accidental nuclear strike", the MOLINK team would telephone the gist of the message to the Situation Room duty officer who would brief the president before a formal translation was complete.

=== Email ===
In 2007, the Moscow–Washington hotline was upgraded; a dedicated computer network links Moscow and Washington. The new system started operations on January 1, 2008. It continues to use the two satellite links but a fiber optic cable replaced the old back-up cable. Commercial software is used for both chat and email: chat to coordinate operations, and email for actual messages. Transmission is nearly instantaneous.

== Usage ==
The first message transmitted over the hotline was on August 30, 1963. Washington sent Moscow the text: "THE QUICK BROWN FOX JUMPED OVER THE LAZY DOG’S BACK 1234567890" (a pangram to test printing of each character in the alphabet). The message was sent in all capital letters, since the equipment did not support lowercase. Later, a Soviet diplomat asked the US Secretary of State, "What does it mean when your people say 'The quick brown fox jumped over the lazy dog'?"

The primary link was accidentally cut several times, for example near Copenhagen by a Danish bulldozer operator, and by a Finnish farmer who ploughed it up once. Regular testing of both the primary and backup links took place daily. During the even hours, the US sent test messages to the Soviet Union. In the odd hours, the Soviet Union sent test messages to the US.

The line was used during:

- 1963: Assassination of President Kennedy
- 1967: Six Day War
- 1968: Apollo 8 mission progress
- 1971: War between India and Pakistan
- 1973: Yom Kippur War
- 1974: Turkish Invasion of Cyprus
- 1979: Soviet–Afghan War
- 1981: Threat of Soviet Invasion of Poland
- 1982: Israeli Invasion of Lebanon
- 1991: Gulf War
- 2001: The 9/11 attacks
- 2003: Aftermath of Iraq War

On October 31, 2016, the Moscow–Washington hotline was used to reinforce Barack Obama's September warning that the U.S. would consider any interference on Election Day a grave matter.

== Other hotlines with Moscow ==
=== US-Russia hotlines and hotline-type agreements ===
- NRRCs: Another hotline-type mechanism for formal communications between Washington and Moscow are the US Nuclear Risk Reduction Center and Russian National Nuclear Risk Reduction Center, which were initiated by Ronald Reagan and Mikhail Gorbachev in 1985 following the Reykjavik Summit to reduce the risk of nuclear war. The negotiations began in May 1986, and the sides agreed in 1987. The sides established NRRCs in Washington and in Moscow, exchanging arms control and confidence building measures notifications, initially including those required by the agreement on Measures to Reduce the Risk of Outbreak of Nuclear War and the 1972 Agreement on the Prevention of Incidents on and over the High Seas, with their duties expanding over the decades to include notifications covering more than 16 treaties and agreements.
- Cyber hotline: In 2012, it was announced that a proposal was being negotiated with Moscow to add cyber warfare to the topics to be discussed on the hotline.
- Syrian Civil War deconfliction hotline: The US and Russia set up a hotline during the Syrian Civil War in September 2015 between US personnel in Qatar and Russian personnel in Syria to prevent unintended escalation and conflict.
- Ukraine War deconfliction hotline: At the beginning of the Russian invasion of Ukraine, the United States and Russia created a deconfliction line to prevent miscalculations or escalation. In November 2022, an anonymous U.S. official told Reuters that the line had only been used once in the war. The official said that the line was used to communicate concerns about Russian military operations near Ukrainian infrastructure, but did not elaborate. The official said it was not used when a Ukrainian missile hit Poland.

=== Russian hotlines with other countries ===
- France: the USSR and France set up a hotline in 1966.
- United Kingdom: the USSR and UK set up a hotline in 1967.
- India: Russia and India set up their head of state-level hotline in 1995.
- China: China first announced the intention to establish a hotline with Russia in 1996, and again in 1998, with a signed agreement in 2000. They established an MOD-MOD hotline in 2008.
- NATO: Russia and NATO have had a hotline between the Secretary General and President since 1997, and between SACEUR and the MOD Minister since 2003.

== In popular culture ==
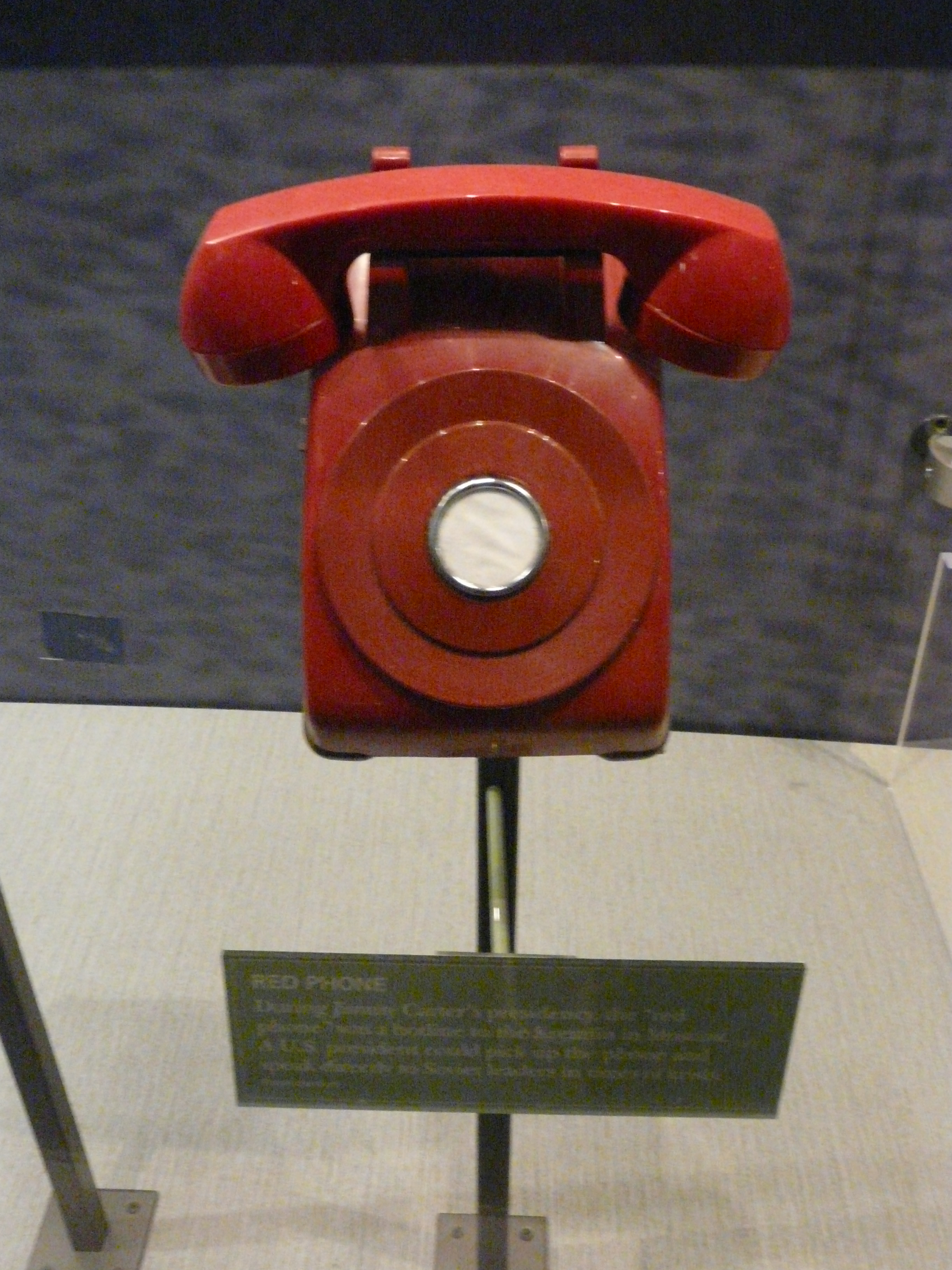
A non-dial "Red Phone" which is on display in the Jimmy Carter Library and Museum. This telephone is actually a prop, erroneously representing the hotline between Washington and Moscow.

In numerous books, movies, video games, etc., the hotline between Washington and Moscow is represented by a red phone, although the real hotline has never been a telephone line.

A hotline telephone was depicted in the film Fail-Safe as the "Red 1 / Ultimate 1 Touch phone", and also in Stanley Kubrick's film Dr. Strangelove, both from 1964 and both loosely based on Peter George's Cold War thriller novel Red Alert from 1958.

A more realistic depiction of the Hotline was Tom Clancy's novel The Sum of All Fears from 1991 and its 2002 film adaptation, in which a text-based computer communications system was depicted, resembling the actual Hotline equipment from the 1980s and 1990s. In the novel the isolated and unprepared President and National Security Advisor consistently misinterpret the Russian messages, prompting the Vice President aboard the National Emergency Airborne Command Post to remark "These damned messages over the Hot Line are making things worse instead of better". The protagonist Jack Ryan then communicates information over the Hotline from the Pentagon's NMCC to both country's leaders that defuses the crisis.

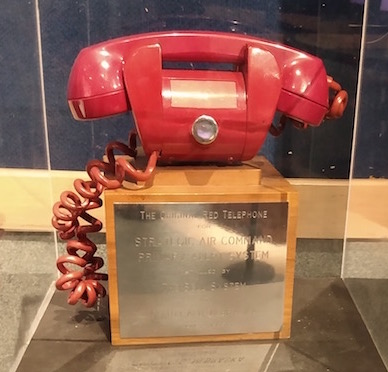
This "Red Phone" was installed in the CINCSAC underground command post at Offutt AFB. Although connected to a hotline for nuclear warfare command communications, it was a component of the SAC Primary Alert System. It did not connect to foreign officials.

In the 1990 HBO film By Dawn's Early Light, the White House Situation Room equipment that receives the (translated) hotline message, apparently relayed by the Pentagon-NMCC MOLINK team, is depicted as a teleprinter (and not as a fax machine, the technology already in use at the NMCC itself by that year).

A telephone is used in the intro cinematic of the video game Command & Conquer: Red Alert 2. The call is placed by the US president to the Kremlin in the wake of a global Soviet invasion.

=== Political advertising ===
The "red phone" was the centerpiece of television commercials used in the 1984 Democratic primary and 1984 presidential election and the 2008 Democratic primary elections. In 1984, an advertisement made by Bob Beckel and Roy Spence on behalf of candidate Walter Mondale suggested that "The most awesome, powerful responsibility in the world lies in the hand that picks up this phone." The advertisement was intended to raise questions about candidate Gary Hart's readiness for the presidency.

The red phone was also featured prominently in an advertisement from that year targeting President Ronald Reagan's Strategic Defense Initiative. In the second ad, the ringing phone goes unanswered while the narrator says, "there will be no time to wake a president – computers will take control." Roy Spence revived the "red phone" idea in 2008 in "Children", an advertisement for candidate Hillary Clinton.

== See also ==
- Islamabad–New Delhi hotline
- Seoul–Pyongyang hotline
- Beijing–Washington hotline
