= Korean Red Cross =

Humanitarian organization in South Korea

- 대한적십자사

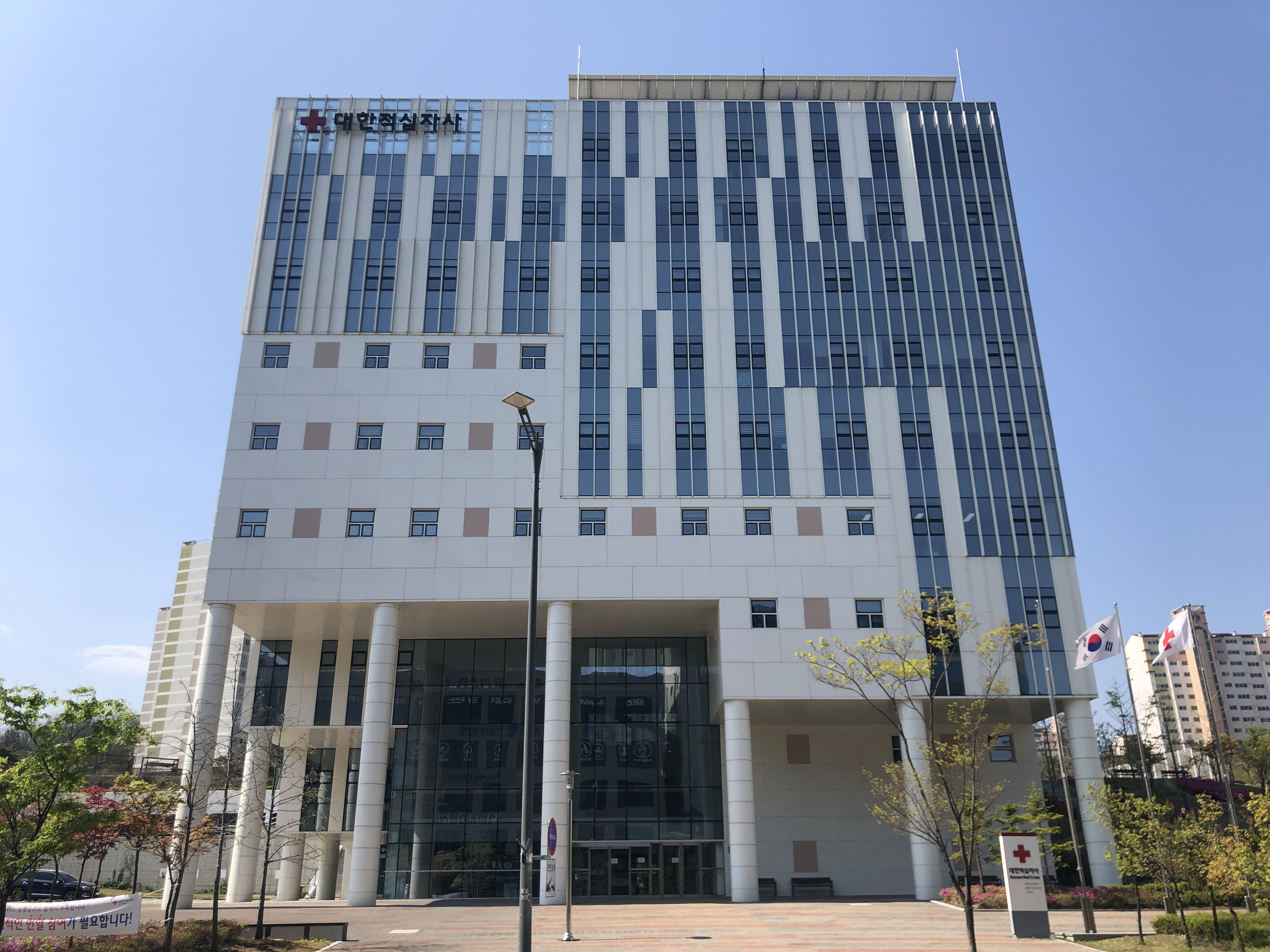
- Korean Red Cross National Headquarters in Wonju
- Formation: October 27, 1905; 121 years ago
- Founder: Emperor Gojong
- Type: NGO
- Purpose: Humanitarian
- Location: Wonju, South Korea
- Region served: Republic of Korea
- President: Shin Hee-young
- Honorary President: Lee Jae-myeong
- Honorary Vice President: Kim Min-seok
- Affiliations: International Red Cross and Red Crescent Movement
- Website: www.redcross.or.kr

- Korean Red Cross
- Hangul: 대한적십자사
- Hanja: 大韓赤十字社
- RR: Daehan Jeoksipjasa
- MR: Taehan Chŏksipchasa

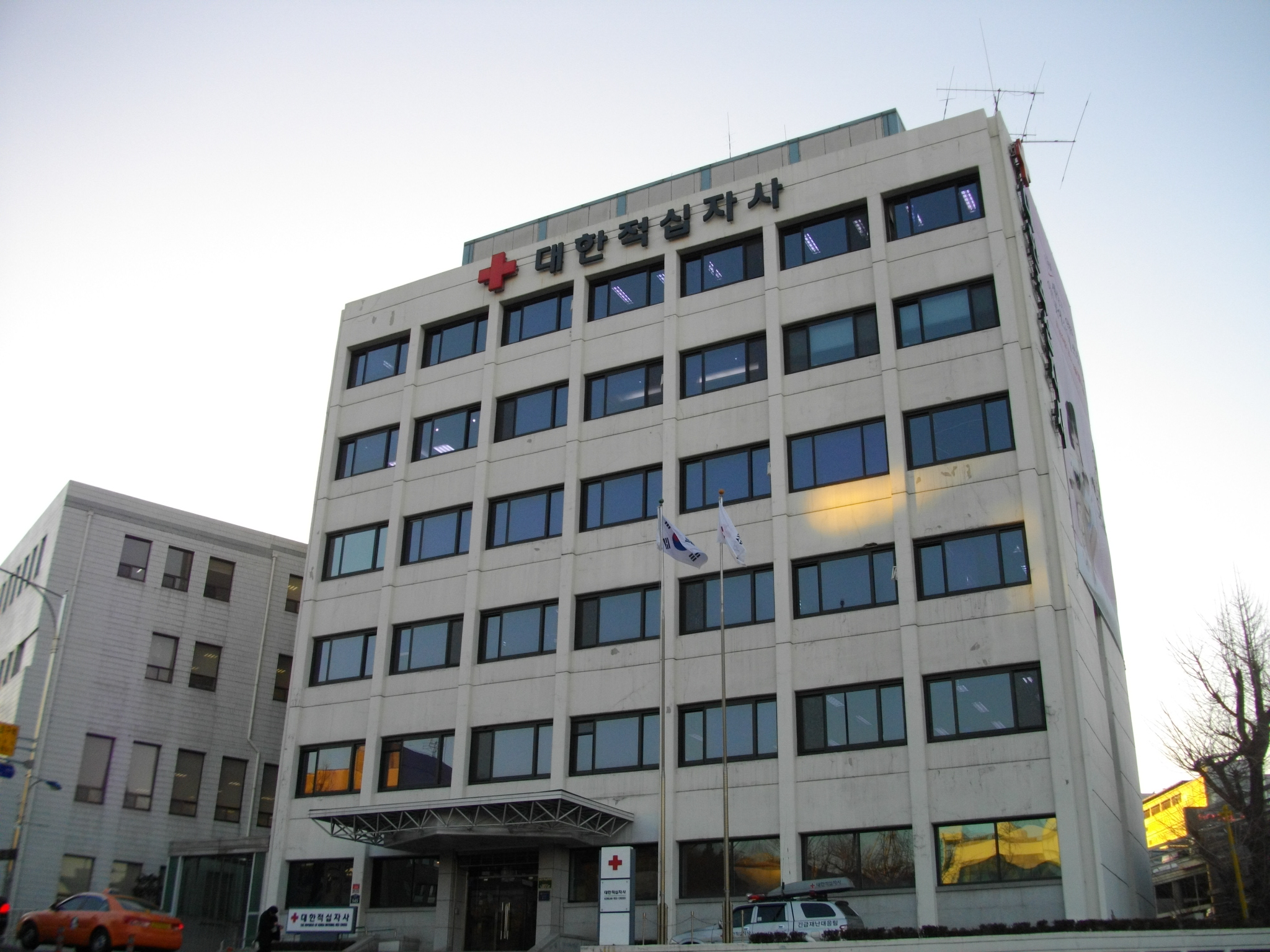
Korean Red Cross Seoul Office

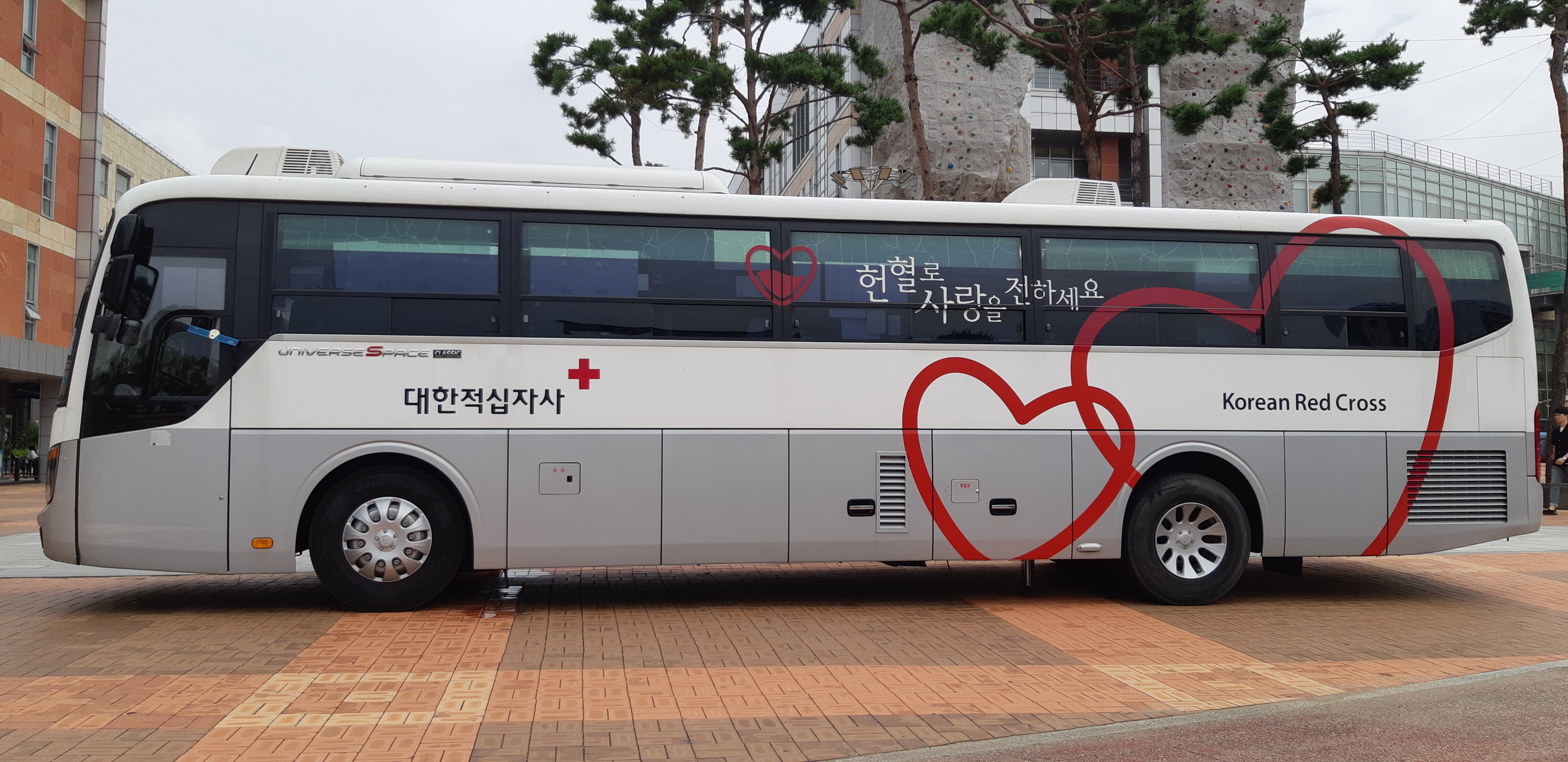
A Hyundai Universe bloodmobile of Korean Red Cross

The Korean Red Cross, fully the Republic of Korea National Red Cross (Korean: 대한적십자사), is a humanitarian organization that provides emergency assistance, disaster relief and education inside South Korea. It is the designated South Korean affiliate of the International Federation of Red Cross and Red Crescent Societies.

== History ==
When Emperor Gojong promulgated a decree to proclaim the formation of the Korean Red Cross on 27 October 1905, the society was founded in Seoul. The Korean Red Cross continued to function under the American-backed government in the southern occupational zone. The organization was recognized by the International Committee of Red Cross on 26 May 1955, became a member of International Red Cross Society on 28 September 1955, and became a member of the International Life Saving Federation (ILS) on Saturday 11 November 1995. The institution has contributed to not only the dissemination of health-related skills and knowledge but also to the protection of public health since 1949.

In 1971 Koreans from both sides officially met and shook hands for the first time, during the delivery of a letter from the North Korean Red Cross Society accepting a proposal from the South Korean National Red Cross for joint investigation of the problems of families separated by the division of the peninsula. Preliminary meetings between delegations of both entities were held multiple times in late in the year. The two societies met about 30 times in the ensuing year, reaching a preliminary agreement. Then in 1973 progress stalled.

== Activity ==
All activities are based on fundamental activity of Red Cross (activity in Korea).

- Therapy to relief work of the victim and prisoners of Korean War as military medical institution by Red Cross renegotiation. (negotiation about the prisoner in armistice talks, 1952)
- Aid for sufferers who get problem such as cataclysm, disease, emergency and many problems. (accident about collapse of Seongsu Bridge in 1994, collapse of Sampoong Department Store in 1995)
- Protection for foreign refugee who suffer from war or emergency.
- Build hospital, mobile clinic, emergency medical station and many sites for medical care.
- Aid for blood trouble through a blood donation campaign, management of blood bank and other things. (begins blood campaign first time in Korea, 1965)
- Many safety movement such as first aid, protection of water, mountain activity, environmental preservation.
- Domestic health care such as free cure, remedy for the disabled, and other treats.
- Education movement and adolescent activity.
- Operation of many voluntary service and community service.
- Dissemination of international humanitarian law and principle of Red Cross. (hold the conference of Asia and Pacific volunteer in 1995)
- Aid and mutual cooperation with international Red Cross.
- The continuous search campaigns for separated families, Red Cross movement and conference between North Korea and Republic of Korea.

== See also ==
- International Red Cross and Red Crescent Movement
- June 15th North–South Joint Declaration
- List of Red Cross and Red Crescent Societies
- Red Cross Society of the Democratic People's Republic of Korea
- Seoul–Pyongyang hotline
