= Red Cross Society of the Democratic People's Republic of Korea =

Humanitarian organization in North Korea

- 조선민주주의인민공화국 적십자회
- Emblem of the Red Cross Society of the DPRK
- Abbreviation: DPRK RCS
- Formation: 27 October 1905; 120 years ago (unified); 18 October 1946; 79 years ago (current)
- Founder: Emperor Gojong
- Type: NGO
- Purpose: Humanitarian
- Headquarters: Pyongyang, North Korea
- Location: Ryonhwa 1 dong, Central District, Pyongyang
- Region served: Democratic People's Republic of Korea
- Secretary General: Ri Ho-rim
- President: Kang Su-rin
- Vice chairman executive: Paek Yong-ho
- Vice chairman: Kim Hyong-hun
- Vice chairman: Ri Chung-bok
- Affiliations: International Federation of Red Cross and Red Crescent Societies
- Volunteers: 3,300
- Website: www.dprkrcs.com.kp

- Red Cross Society of the Democratic People's Republic of Korea
- Chosŏn'gŭl: 조선민주주의인민공화국 적십자회
- Hancha: 朝鮮民主主義人民共和國 赤十字會
- Revised Romanization: Joseon Minjujuui Inmin Gonghwaguk Jeoksipjahoe
- McCune–Reischauer: Chosŏn Minjujuŭi Inmin Konghwaguk Chŏksipchahoe

The Red Cross Society of the Democratic People's Republic of Korea (DPRK RCS; Korean: 조선민주주의인민공화국 적십자회; MR: Chosŏn Minjujuŭi Inmin Konghwaguk Chŏksipchahoe) is the national Red Cross Society of North Korea. It was founded as the Red Cross Society of North Korea on 18 October 1946 by the Soviet-backed occupational government.

It was admitted into the International Federation of Red Cross and Red Crescent Societies (IFRC) on 11 May 1956. This admittance had a great symbolic importance, as the North Korean regime remained outside most international organizations for decades.

The DPRK RCS is active in flood relief work as flooding is a prominent humanitarian problem in North Korea. Issues related to water supply, damage to the infrastructure, landslides, a need for food aid, homelessness and waterborne diseases are also other humanitarian problems faced by the DPRK RCS.

The society has participated in family reunions of Korean families separated by the Korean War and in repatriation of Japanese Koreans. Other humanitarian and relief activities abroad have targeted China, India, Iran, the former Soviet Union, Argentina, Jamaica, Egypt, Benin, and Somalia.

== History ==
The society has its roots to the Korean Red Cross, which was then established by Emperor Gojong's edict on 27 October 1905. Following the division of Korea, the organization was founded as the "Red Cross Society of North Korea" on 18 October 1946 by the Soviet-backed authorities in the northern occupation zone. It was renamed "Red Cross Society of the Democratic People's Republic of Korea" in December 1948, by Decision No. 101 of the Cabinet of North Korea. By 1950, it had become a nation-wide organization. It was admitted into the International Federation of Red Cross and Red Crescent Societies (IFRC) on 11 May 1956. This admittance had a great symbolic importance for North Korea, as the regime had been isolated from almost all of international organizations such as the United Nations, which it only joined in 1991. One of the original tasks for the society was prevention of once prevalent infectious diseases such as tuberculosis.

The DPRK RCS held a prominent role in aftermath of the Korean War. The society provided the people with food, clothing, bedding and medical services at provincial hospitals, and first aid posts.

In 1971, Koreans from both sides officially met and shook hands for the first time, during the delivery of a letter from the North Korean Red Cross Society accepting a proposal from the South Korean National Red Cross for joint investigation of the problems of families separated by the division of the peninsula. Preliminary meetings between delegations of both entities were held multiple times in late in the year. The two societies met about 30 times in the ensuing year, reaching a preliminary agreement. Then in 1973 progress stalled.

The Law on the Red Cross Society of the Democratic People's Republic of Korea further defines its role, and was adopted by Decree 2113 of the Presidium of the Supreme People's Assembly on 10 January 2007.

The DPRK RCS was involved in repatriating Japanese Koreans in 1959 and in returning "unconverted long-term prisoners", North Korean loyalist prisoners in South Korea, in 1993 and 2000. The DPRK RCS has also worked on family reunions for families separated by the Korean War.

In 2016, the society celebrated its 70th anniversary, and foreign partners from the International Red Cross and Red Crescent Movement visited Sinyang County to learn about programs to improve food production and increase local awareness on natural disasters.

== Activities ==
Administratively DPRK RCS, has central, provincial, city and county level committees. Its secretary general is Ri Ho-rim, president Kang Su-rin, vice chairman executive Paek Yong-ho, and vice chairmen Kim Hyong-hun and Ri Chung-bok. The organization is based in the Central District of Pyongyang.

The DPRK RCS is often active in the flood relief work, as flooding in North Korea remains a major humanitarian concern. Other major humanitarian problems related to the flooding, and faced by the IFRC, are damage to the water supply in both urban and rural communities, damage to the infrastructure, landslides, a need for the food aid, homelessness and waterborne diseases. As of 2016, deforestation remains a major contributing cause for natural disasters. The DPRK RCS also sent aid to South Korea after record flooding there in August and early September 1984. The society's other humanitarian and relief activities abroad have targeted China, Japan, India, Iran, the former Soviet Union, Argentina, Jamaica, Egypt, Benin, and Somalia.

As of July 2013, there were 3,300 Red Cross volunteers in the North Korea.

In 2013, its programs reached 8.89 million North Koreans. Healthcare programs focusing on women and children have been implemented in 56 cities.

Additionally, it operates the Pyongyang Red Cross Hospital which is considered amongst the best in the DPRK.

== See also ==
- International Red Cross and Red Crescent Movement
- June 15th North–South Joint Declaration
- List of Red Cross and Red Crescent Societies
- Republic of Korea National Red Cross
- Seoul–Pyongyang hotline

== References and sources ==
=== Works cited ===
- "Report of the DPRK Association for Human Rights Studies" (PDF). Pyongyag: DPRK Association for Human Rights Studies. 13 September 2014. Archived from the original (PDF) on 13 November 2014.
