= National Nuclear Risk Reduction Center =

Russian Ministry of Defense agency

Emblem of the National Nuclear Risk Reduction Center

Emblem of the Inspection Group

The National Nuclear Risk Reduction Center (Russian: НЦУЯО, Национальный центр по уменьшению ядерной опасности) is part of the Russian Ministry of Defense, and known also as The Directorate for Control of Agreements' Implementation (In Russian: Управление Министерства обороны Российской Федерации по контролю за выполнением договоров). It has counterpart in Washington D.C. in the United States Department of State. The main task is the organization of work on the implementation of agreements in the field of Arms reduction and implementation of all the international agreements which were signed by the Russian Ministry of Defence.

Sergei Ryzhkov is the current head of the Directorate.

== History ==
On September 15, 1987, an agreement between the USA and USSR was signed for the establishment of National Centers for nuclear risk reduction in Moscow and Washington.

Thus, On December 14, 1987 the Government of the Soviet Union established the NTsUYaO (Национальный центр по уменьшению ядерной опасности ,НЦУЯО) National Nuclear Risk Reduction Center which was subordinate under the Soviet Chief of Staff of the Armed Forces of the Soviet Union.

From its establishment the center has been tasked with informing the government about launches of missiles, but soon its tasks increased due to the Intermediate-Range Nuclear Forces Treaty with the United States about the removal and elimination of intermediate and short range missiles, from December 8, 1987. Shortly, after that the center become the primary body responsible for control and inspection of nuclear and strategic weapons in Soviet Union.

Since February 24, 1988 the center has been active full time, and since April 1 in the same year, a hotline between the center and its US counterpart, the Nuclear Risk Reduction Center, was established.

Its purpose was to create an additional channel of communication for the prevention of nuclear war, in addition to the Hot Line and diplomatic channels. The Center is online 24 hours a day and relays information regarding the arms activities of both nations so as to prevent accidental outbreak of nuclear war.

The Center is taking part in open skies agreements. The Treaty on Open Skies establishes a program of unarmed aerial surveillance flights over the entire territory of its participants. It was signed in March 1992 and became one of the major confidence-building measures in Europe after the Cold War. It entered into force on January 1, 2002, and currently has 34 States Parties, including Russia and the majority of the NATO countries. Moscow ratified the Treaty on Open Skies on May 26, 2001. The treaty allows its participants to openly gather information on each other's military forces and activities.

== See also ==
- Lists of nuclear disasters and radioactive incidents
- Nuclear Risk Reduction Center
