= Nuclear Risk Reduction Center =

U.S. Department of State agency

The Nuclear Risk Reduction Center (NRRC) is part of the United States Department of State. Its Russian counterpart in Moscow is the National Nuclear Risk Reduction Center in the Russian Ministry of Defense.

The NRRC was created in 1987 by an agreement between the United States Secretary of State and the Soviet Foreign Minister. Its purpose was to create an additional channel of communication for the prevention of nuclear war, in addition to the Hot Line and diplomatic channels. The NRRC began operations on April 1, 1988. The NRRC is online 24 hours a day and relays information regarding the arms activities of both nations so as to prevent accidental outbreak of nuclear war.

In 2013, the Nuclear Risk Reduction Center was expanded in scope in order to convey inquiries and messages regarding cybersecurity incidents. On October 31, 2016, the channel was used to convey a message demanding an end to Russian interference with the United States Presidential election.

== See also ==
- Lists of nuclear disasters and radioactive incidents
- National Nuclear Risk Reduction Center
