= Beijing–Washington hotline =

Communication system between China and the US

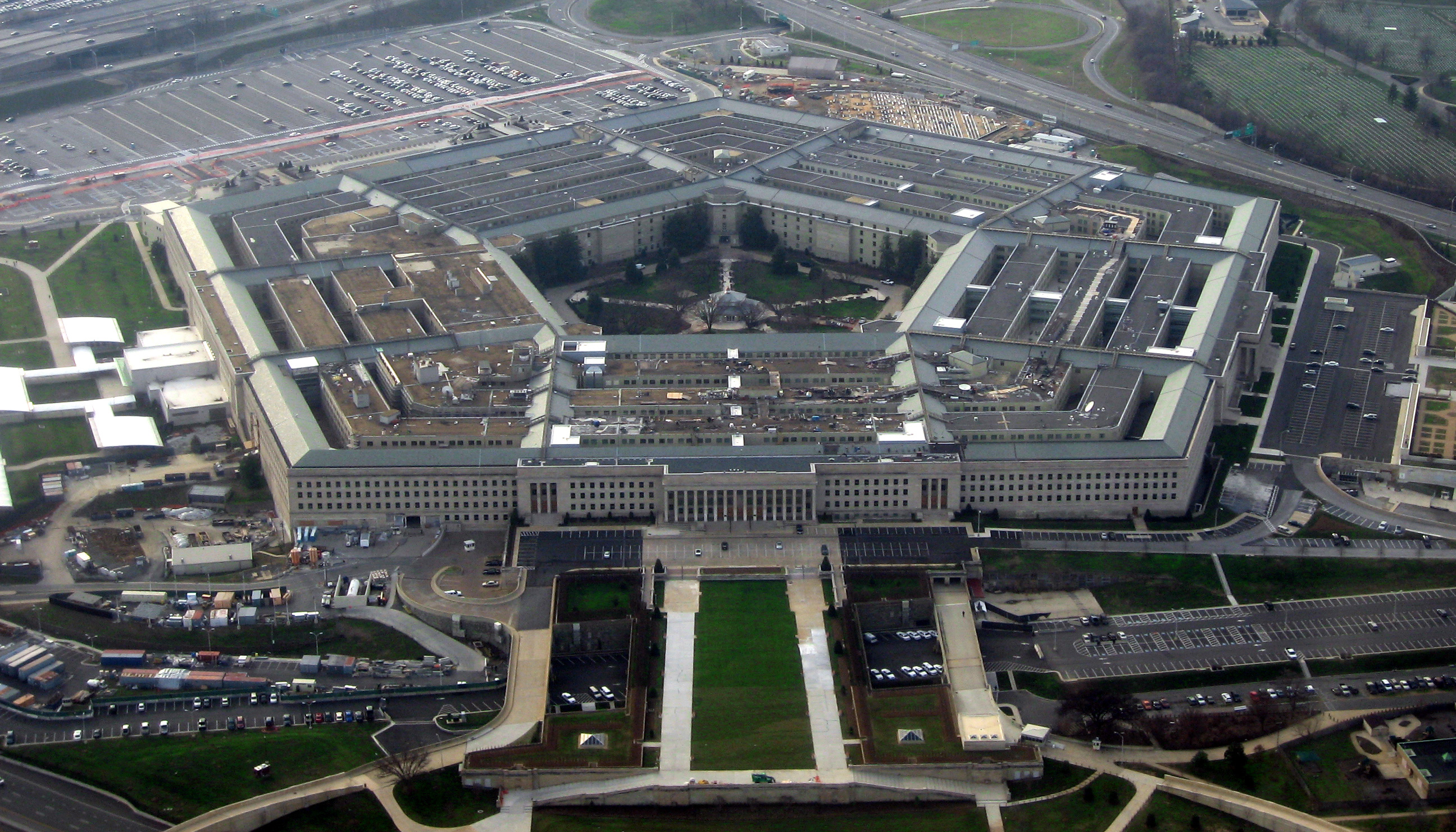
The Pentagon, outside Washington, D.C.

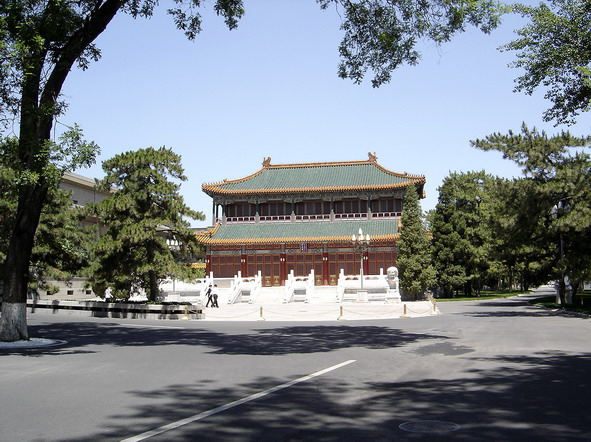
Zhongnanhai (site of China's state council), Beijing

The Beijing–Washington hotline is a system that allows direct communication between the President of the United States and the General Secretary of the Chinese Communist Party. This hotline was established in November 2007, when both countries announced that they would set up a military hotline to avoid misunderstanding between their militaries during any moments of crisis in the Pacific.

== History ==
Discussions to set up a Beijing–Washington hotline started during a meeting between Chinese leader Hu Jintao and U.S. President George W. Bush in April 2006.

On 5 November 2007, U.S. Defense Secretary Robert M. Gates told reporters that he and Chinese Defense Minister Cao Gangchuan formally agreed to set up the dedicated 24-hour phone line in Beijing. According to a report, China's Defense Ministry long resisted the idea of a direct line until June 2007, when General Zhang Qinsheng stated that China was ready to proceed with the establishment at the Shangri-La Dialogue security conference in Singapore. After a meeting in February 2008, China and the United States officially signed an agreement to set up a military hotline between the United States Department of Defense and the Ministry of National Defense of China. The hotline was set up on 10 April 2008.

The Beijing–Washington hotline uses different procedures compared to the Moscow–Washington hotline which was set up after the Cuban Missile Crisis. The 2008 agreement with China arranges a call to be put through to the Zhongnanhai telecommunications directorate, which has discretion on whether to forward the call to the foreign affairs section of the Department of Defense or the People's Liberation Army (PLA)'s command headquarters in West Beijing. Furthermore, in protest against US actions, the Chinese have cut off the hotline twice for extended time periods.

In September 2015, Chinese leader Xi Jinping and U.S. President Barack Obama announced agreements on a new military hotline to reduce the risks of accidental escalations between the two countries.

In May 2021, Kurt Campbell, the US policy coordinator for the Indo-Pacific, said that China had been reluctant to use the hotline, describing it as "the couple of times we've used it, just rung in an empty room for hours upon hours". In February 2023 Minister of Defense of China, Wei Fenghe, declined to respond to a call from U.S. Defense Secretary Lloyd Austin regarding a balloon over the Beaufort Sea in the vicinity of Deadhorse, Alaska, during the 2023 Chinese balloon incident. The hotline was restored after President Joe Biden's meeting with Xi Jinping at the 2023 APEC summit.

== Space hotline ==
In November 2015, the U.S. and China set up a so-called space hotline, allowing both nations to easily share information about activities in space and help their space and military agencies to discuss "potential collisions, approaches, or tests" to prevent misunderstanding or miscommunication from escalating to a dangerous situation. According to U.S. Assistant Secretary Of State Frank Rose, an urgent safety mechanism was required due to the growing amount of potentially lethal space debris in orbit, as well as numerous undisclosed military satellite launches. The link was established amid tensions due to China ramping up tests of weapons designed to target the orbital networks upon which almost all US high-tech military capabilities depend.

== Cyber hotline ==
In November 2011, an editorial in the China Daily called for closer communication through a cyber red phone, especially in cases of an emergency concerning matters of cyberwarfare.

== See also ==
- Moscow–Washington hotline
- Seoul–Pyongyang hotline
- Islamabad–New Delhi hotline
- Cold War II § Novel risks and measures for preventing escalation
- China–United States relations
