= Islamabad–New Delhi hotline =

Communication system between India and Pakistan

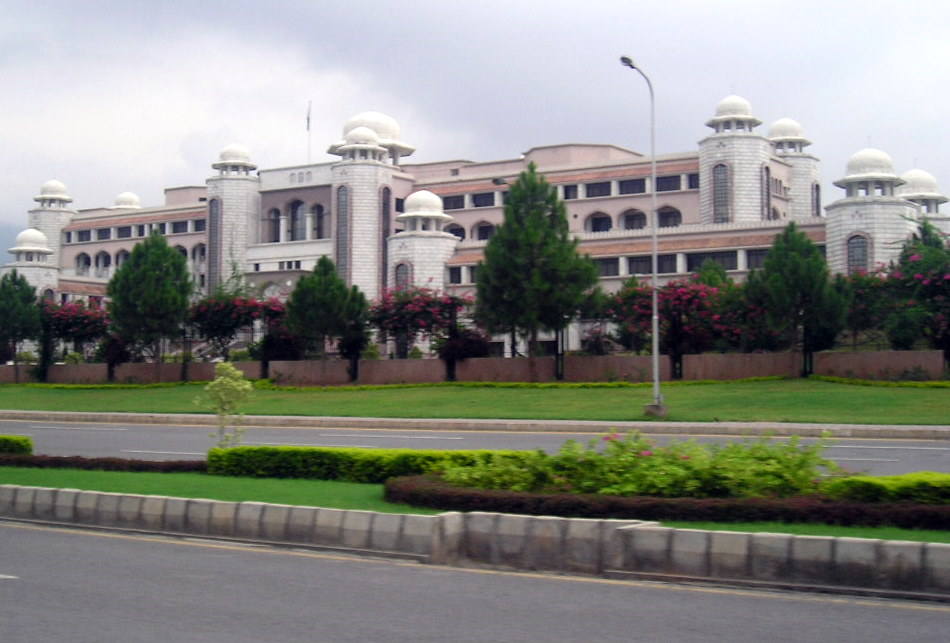
The Prime Minister's Office in Islamabad

The Islamabad–New Delhi hotline is a system that allows direct communication between the leaders of India and Pakistan. The hotline, according to the media sources, was established in 1971, shortly after the end of the 1971 war. The hotline linked the Prime minister's Office in Islamabad via Directorate-General of Military Operations (DGMO) to Secretariat Building in New Delhi.

The hotline has seldom been used by the military leadership of India and Pakistan, even at the time of an escalation of tension. It is also called Hotline Linkage. In regard to the Moscow–Washington hotline model, the hotline serves the purpose, as both technological and strategic rationale, for establishing the link between two countries. The Islamabad–Delhi hotline is a secure communication link over which many procedural operations are obtained in different formats.

== History ==
According to the Indian media sources, the hotline was established by the governments of India and Pakistan shortly after the end of the 1971 war. The foreign ministries of India and Pakistan signed the mutual agreement for the implementation of the hotline. The hotline was modelled directly on the Moscow–Washington hotline which was established in 1963. The hotline became operational in the 1970s after both countries' foreign ministries transmitted the messages.

The first usage of the hotline was in 1991 between the militaries of India and Pakistan to work on confidence-building measures. The second usage of the hotline was in 1997, when both countries informed each other on trade issues. In 1998, when both countries had publicly conducted nuclear tests (Pokhran-II, Chagai-I & Chagai-II), the hotline was extensively used between the leaders of both countries. Since 2005, the hotline has been used by each country to inform the other of their nuclear missile tests in the region.

== Other hotlines ==
In 2011, Indian and Pakistani authorities agreed to create an anti-terrorism hotline.

A cyber warfare hotline was established.

An agreement to establish a hotline to reduce the risk of nuclear warfare was made on 20 June 2004 between Indian and Pakistani authorities. The hotline was aimed for providing warnings about incidents that could be misinterpreted as nuclear attacks.

In association with the 10 May 2025 ceasefire of the 2025 India–Pakistan conflict, military hotlines were "activated".

== See also ==
- Moscow–Washington hotline
- Beijing–Washington hotline
- Seoul–Pyongyang hotline
