= Seoul–Pyongyang hotline =

Communication system between South Korea and North Korea

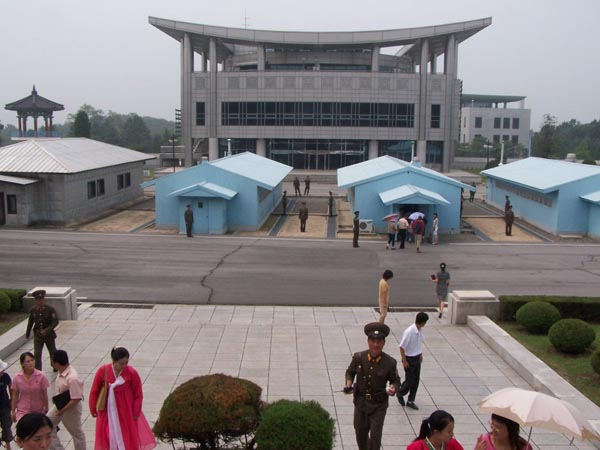
In the background: the South Korean Freedom House in the Joint Security Area (JSA), where the South Korean terminal of the Red Cross border hotline is located

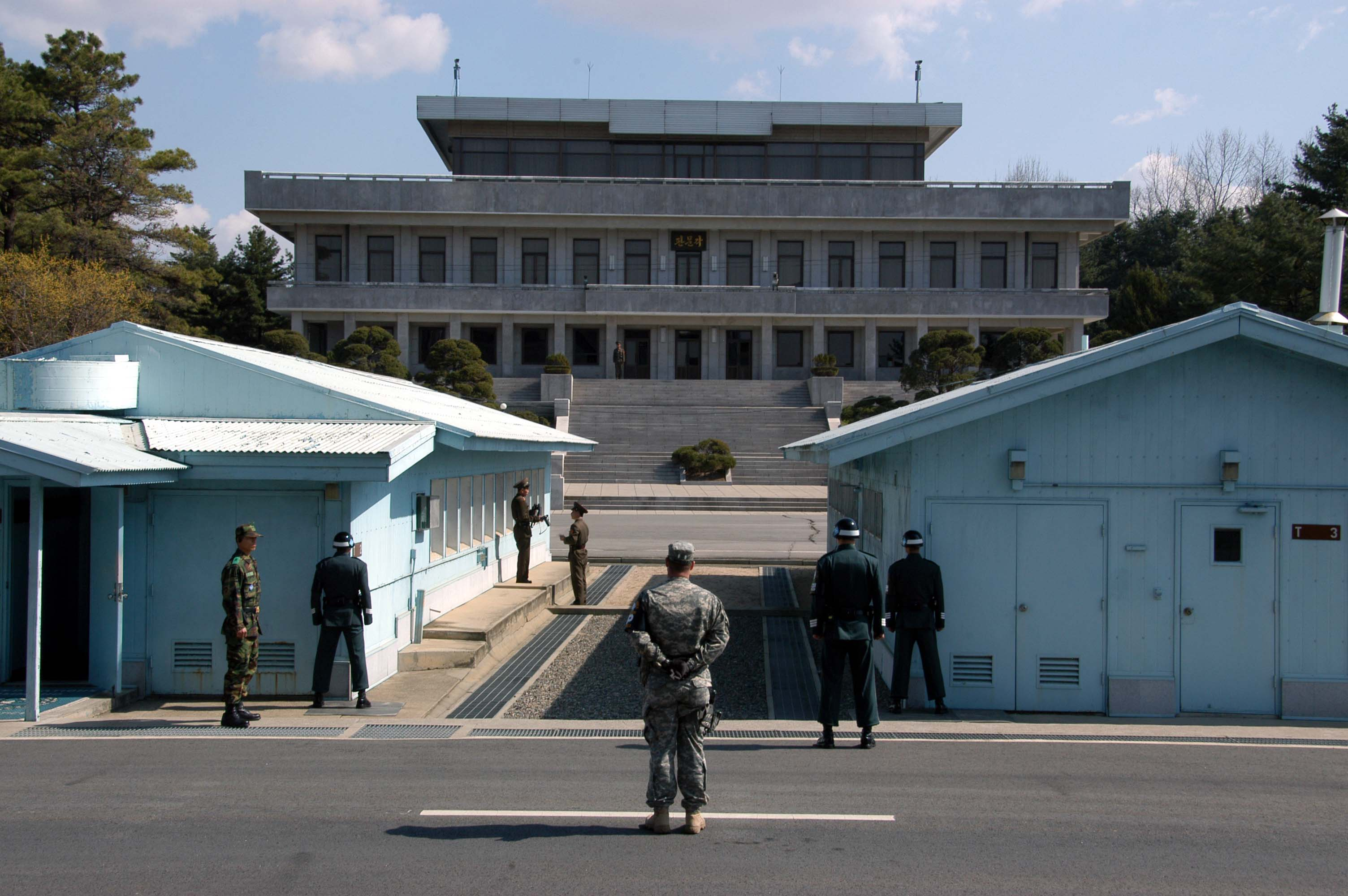
The North Korean Panmungak building in the Joint Security Area (JSA), where the North Korean terminal of the Red Cross border hotline is located

The Seoul–Pyongyang hotline, also known as the inter-Korean hotline, is a series of over 40 telephone lines that connect North and South Korea. Most of them run through the Panmunjom Joint Security Area (JSA) within the Korean Demilitarized Zone (DMZ) and are maintained by the Red Cross.

== Configuration ==
The border hotline in the Panmunjom area has terminals located in the Freedom House at the South Korean side and in the Panmungak building at the North Korean side. The terminals consist of a computer screen with red and green telephone handsets.

In total, there are 33 telecommunication lines between North and South Korea that run through Panmunjom. Five of them are used for daily communications, 21 for negotiations between the two countries, two for handling air traffic, two for sea transport and three for economic co-operation.

Additionally, there are 15 telephone lines which run outside Panmunjom because of geographical reasons. These include lines between military authorities and for the inter-Korean railroad between Dorasan Station in the South and Panmun Station in the North.

== History ==
The first hotline was established in September 1971 to allow the North and South Korean Red Crosses to negotiate. Further lines were agreed to, in principle, at the 4 July 1972 Joint Communiqué between the two states and began operation on 18 August 1972. More lines were established throughout the 1990s and 2000s.

The hotlines were unilaterally disconnected by North Korea eight times: in 1976, 1980, 1996, 2008, 2010, 2013, 2016, and 2021. Each time, the lines were reconnected again after some time.

In 2013, North Korea disconnected the hotline between 11 March and 3 July, when it withdrew from the 1953 armistice and voided non-aggression pacts with South Korea. This was in response to rising tension between North Korea, South Korea, and the United States. According to a government official from South Korea on 11 March 2013 a call was placed "at 9 a.m. and there was no response". North Korea reopened the hotline on July 7, 2013.

In February 2016, North Korea cut off the hotline communications after South Korea suspended the cooperation between both countries in the Kaesong Industrial Region as a response to a nuclear weapons test by the North. After Kim Jong-un's New Year's address, the hotline was reopened again on January 3, 2018.

On April 20, 2018, a hotline connecting President Moon Jae-in to North Korean leader Kim Jong-un was installed, one week ahead of their historic April 27 summit. The direct communication line was set up between Moon's office at Cheong Wa Dae and Kim's office at the State Affairs Commission.

In September 2021, North Korean leader Kim Jong-un offered to restore the Inter-Korean hotline after it severed the connection in early August 2021, in protest against joint South Korea-U.S. military exercises. On 4 October 2021 South Korea’s Unification Ministry confirmed the restoration of the hotline, saying that it "laid the ground for bringing the relations between the two Koreas back on track".

== See also ==
- Moscow–Washington hotline
- Islamabad–New Delhi hotline
- Beijing–Washington hotline
