= Paek Yong-ho =

North Korean diplomat

- Hangul: 백용호
- Hanja: 白容鎬
- RR: Baek Yongho
- MR: Paek Yongho

Paek Yong Ho (Korean pronunciation: [pɛ.ɡjoŋ.ɦo] or [pɛk̚] [joŋ.ɦo]; born 1945) is General Secretary to the Central Committee of the Red Cross Society of North Korea. This body is the North Korean affiliate of the International Federation of Red Cross and Red Crescent Societies.

Paek first served in this capacity from 1994 to 1997, at which time he was the chief delegate to the North-South Red Cross talks held in Beijing in 1997. Thereafter, he held positions as ambassador to Middle Eastern countries including Egypt and Morocco, from 1997 to 2000. He returned to the Red Cross post in 2001 after Secretary Jang Sung-gil defected to the United States.
