= Statsionar =

System of soviet communication satellites

The Statsionar satellite system was a system of Soviet communications satellites similar to the American Intelsat military communications system. The system was mainly made up of Gorizont II class satellites.

The number of satellites planned and launched is a subject of debate. According to the CIA, 11 satellites were planned, but other sources have quoted 10 and 7 satellites. The system was never top secret, and the Soviet Union voluntarily released information about the system.

According to declassified CIA documents, the Soviet Union launched the first satellite, Statsionar 1 in 1975, 5 years behind schedule, and planned to deploy the last satellite in the Statsionar system in 1980. The CIA studied the system, and concluded that Statsionar was not being created as a counter to the Intelsat system, and would not have any effect on American satellite communications. The CIA also concluded that Statsionar was behind the capabilities of Intelsat by at least 5 years, and that the system would have trouble meeting even its own, comparatively low operation standards.

Statsionar was used to send commands from Soviet leadership to field units. However, the main purpose of Statsionar was to broadcast television channels and for other non-military purposes. The Soviet Union first made plans for the Statsionar program in 1969.

Intersputnik, the Soviet equivalent to Intelsat used Statsionar for some of its communications purposes, but after enough satellites in the Intersputnik system had been launched, Stationar was no longer used.

The CIA reported that several non-communist countries, such as Nigeria, had expressed interest in using Statsionar in their own communications.
