= Now What =

Now What may refer to:

- Now What (Lisa Marie Presley album), a 2005 album by Lisa Marie Presley
- Now What (horse), racehorse
- "Now What?" (House), an episode of House
- Now What?!, a 2013 album by Deep Purple
- Now What?, a 1995 film by Tony Gardner
- Now What with Ryan Duffy, a documentary series by Huffington Post
- MTV's Now What, an MTV television series

== See also ==
- What Now (disambiguation)
