= List of Kim Jong Il's titles =

The Eternal Leader of North Korea 12 January 2012 – present

Kim Jong Il, the former leader of North Korea, received numerous titles during his rule. Despite his death in 2011, he is currently the Eternal Leader of the Party and the Revolution since 2012.

== Usage of North Korean media ==
When he is mentioned in North Korean media and publications, he is most commonly referred to as "Great Leader Comrade Kim Jong Il" (위대한 령도자 김정일동지) or "General" (장군님).

Like his father and son, when his name is written, it is always emphasised by a special bold font or in a larger font size, for example: "The great leader Comrade Kim Jong Il provides on-the-spot guidance to the Ragwon Machine Complex." and/or "The great leader Comrade Kim Jong Il provides on-the-spot guidance to the Ragwon Machine Complex."

== List of official titles and offices ==
=== Official titles ===
Chosŏn'gŭl (Hancha)	DPRK McCune–Reischauer	English	Comment	References
조선로동당의 영원한 총비서	Yŏngwŏnhan Tang Ch'ongbisŏ	Eternal General Secretary of the Workers' Party of Korea	Appointed at the 4th Conference of the Workers' Party of Korea on 11 April 2012.	
공화국의 영원한 국방위원회 위원장	Konghwagugŭi Yŏngwŏnhan Kukpangwiwŏnhoe Wiwŏnjang	Eternal Chairman of the National Defense Commission	Appointed at the 5th Meeting of the 12th Supreme People's Assembly on 13 April 2012.	
조선민주주의인민공화국 대원수	Chosŏnminjujuŭiinmin'gonghwaguk Taewŏnsu	Generalissimo of the Democratic People's Republic of Korea	Posthumously promoted on 14 February 2012.	

=== Held offices and titles ===
Chosŏn'gŭl (Hancha)	DPRK McCune–Reischauer	English	Tenure	Comment	References
Party
조선로동당 중앙위원회 위원	Chosŏn Rodongdang Chungangwiwŏnhoe wiwŏn	Member of the Central Committee of the Workers' Party of Korea	October 1972 – 17 December 2011	Elected at the 5th Plenary Meeting of the 5th Party Central Committee.	
조선로동당 중앙위원회 비서	Chosŏn Rodongdang Chungangwiwŏnhoe pisŏ	Secretary of the Central Committee of the Workers' Party of Korea	September 1973 – 8 October 1997	Elected at the 7th Plenary Meeting of the 5th Party Central Committee, re-elected at the 6th Congress of the WPK.	
조선로동당 중앙위원회 정치위원회 위원	Chosŏn Rodongdang Chungangwiwŏnhoe chŏngch'iwiwŏnhoe wiwŏn	Member of the Political Committee of the Central Committee of the Workers' Party of Korea	February 1974 – October 1980	Elected at the 8th Plenary Meeting of the 5th Party Central Committee.	
조선로동당 중앙위원회 정치국 상무위원회위원		Member of the Presidium of the Political Bureau of the Central Committee of the Workers' Party of Korea	October 1980 – 17 December 2011	Elected at the 6th Congress of the WPK, re-elected at the 3rd Conference of the WPK.	
조선로동당 중앙위원회 정치국 위원		Member of the Political Bureau of the Central Committee of the Workers' Party of Korea	October 1980 – 17 December 2011	Elected at the 6th Congress of the WPK, re-elected at the 3rd Conference of the WPK.	
조선로동당 중앙군사위원회 위원		Member of the Central Military Commission of the Workers' Party of Korea	October 1980 – 17 December 2011	Elected at the 6th Congress of the WPK, re-elected at the 3rd Conference of the WPK.	
조선로동당 총비서	Chosŏn Rodongdang Ch'ongbisŏ	General Secretary of the Workers' Party of Korea	8 October 1997 – 17 December 2011	Elected by joint notice between the Central Committee and the Central Military Commission of the WPK, re-elected at the 3rd Conference of the WPK.	
조선로동당 중앙군사위원회 위원장	Chosŏn Rodongdang chunganggunsawiwŏnhoe wiwŏnjang	Chairman of the Central Military Commission of the Workers' Party of Korea	8 October 1997 – 17 December 2011		
State
조선민주주의인민공화국 최고인민회의 대의원		Deputy to the Supreme Peoples' Assembly of the DPRK	February 1982 – 17 December 2011	Elected to the 7th to 12th Supreme Peoples' Assembly.	
조선민주주의인민공화국 국방위원회 제1부위원장		First-vice-chairman of the National Defence Commission of the DPRK	23 May 1990 – 9 April 1993	Elected at the 1st session of the 9th Supreme People's Assembly.	
조선민주주의인민공화국 국방위원회 위원장	Chosŏnminjujuŭiinmin'gonghwaguk Kukpangwiwŏnhoe wiwŏnjang	Chairman of the National Defence Commission of the DPRK	9 April 1993 – 17 December 2011	Elected at the 5th Session of the 9th Supreme People's Assembly, re-elected at the 1st meetings of the 10th to 12th Supreme Peoples' Assembly.	
Army
조선인민군 최고사령관	Chosŏn Inmin'gun Ch'oegosaryŏnggwan	Supreme Commander of the Korean People's Army	24 December 1991 – 17 December 2011		
조선민주주의인민공화국 원수	Chosŏnminjujuŭiinmin'gonghwaguk Wŏnsu	Marshal of the DPRK	April 1992 – 14 February 2012		

== List of propagated titles ==
Chosŏn'gŭl (Hancha)	DPRK McCune–Reischauer	English	Comment	References
당중앙 (黨中央)	Tangjungang	Party Centre/Center of the Party	The first of Kim Jong Il's titles. Has been in use since 1973 after Kim was secretly appointed as his father's successor and until it was officially announced in order to mention Kim Jong Il in press without calling him by name.	
웃분	Utpun	Superior Person	The title has been in use since the middle of the 1970s.	
친애하는 지도자 (親愛하는 指導者)	Ch'inaehanŭn chidoja	Dear Leader	This title was the most common title during Kim Il Sung's rule.	
존경하는 지도자 (尊敬하는 指導者)	Chon'gyŏnghanŭn chidoja	Respected Leader	The title has been in use since the middle of the 1970s.	
현명한 지도자 (賢明한 指導者)	Hyŏnmyŏnghan chidoja	Wise Leader	The title has been in use since the middle of the 1970s.	
영명하신 지도자 (英明하신 指導者)	Yŏngmyŏnghasin chidoja	Brilliant Leader	The title has been in use since the middle of the 1970s.	
유일한 지도자 (唯一한 指導者)	Yuirhan chidoja	Unique Leader	The title has been in use since June 1975.	
령도자가 갖추어야 할 풍모를 완벽하게 지닌 친애하는 지도자 (領導者가 갖추어야 할 風貌를 完璧하게 지닌 親愛하는 指導者)	Ryŏngdojaga katch'uŏya hal p'ungmorŭl wanbyŏk'age chinin ch'inaehanŭn chidoja	Dear Leader, Who is a Perfect Incarnation of the Appearance that a Leader Should Have	In use since the mid-1980s on special occasions.	
최고사령관 (最高司令官)	Ch'oegosaryŏnggwan	Supreme Commander	First mentioned in the middle of the 1980s before Kim was officially appointed as Supreme Commander of the Korean People's Army.	
위대한 령도자 (偉大한 領導者)	Widaehan ryŏngdoja	Great Leader	The most common of current Kim Jong Il's titles.	
인민의 어버이 (人民의 어버이)	Inminŭi ŏbŏi	Father of the People	In use since February 1986.	
공산주의 미래의 태양 (共産主義 未來의 太陽)	Kongsanjuŭi mirae-ŭi t'aeyang	Sun of the Communist Future	In use since the middle of the 1980s.	
백두광명성 (百頭光明星)	Paektu Kwangmyŏngsŏng	Shining Star of Paektu Mountain	In use since the middle of the 1980s.	
향도의 해발 (嚮導의 해발)	Hyangdo-ŭi haebal	Guiding Sun Ray	In use since the middle of the 1980s.	
혁명무력의 수위 (革命武力의 首位)	Hyŏngmyŏngmuryŏg-ŭi suwi	Leader of the Revolutionary Armed Forces	In use since December 21, 1991, when Kim Jong Il became Supreme Commander of the Korean People's Army.	
조국통일의 구성 (祖國統一의 構成)	Choguk t'ongir-ŭi kusŏng	Guarantee of the Fatherland's Unification	In use since December 21, 1991, when Kim Jong Il became Supreme Commander of the Korean People's Army.	
조국 통일의 상징 (祖國 統一의 象徵)	Choguk t'ongir-ŭi sangjing	Symbol of the Fatherland's Unification	In use since December 21, 1991, when Kim Jong Il became Supreme Commander of the Korean People's Army.	
민족의 운명 (民族의 命運)	Minjok-ŭi unmyŏng	Fate of the Nation	In use since December 21, 1991, when Kim Jong Il became Supreme Commander of the Korean People's Army.	
자애로운 아버지 (慈愛로운 아버지)	Cha-aeroun Abŏji	Beloved Father	In use since December 21, 1991, when Kim Jong Il became Supreme Commander of the Korean People's Army.	
당과 국가와 군대의 수위 (黨과 國家와 軍隊의 首位)	Tanggwa kukkawa kundae-ŭi suwi	Leader of the Party, the country, and the Army	In use since December 21, 1991, when Kim Jong Il became Supreme Commander of the Korean People's Army.	
수령 (首領)	Suryŏng	Leader	Became common after Kim Il Sung's death.	
장군 (將軍)	Changgun	General	One of the most common titles. In use since 1994.	
우리당과 우리 인민의 위대한 령도자 (우리黨과 우리 人民의 偉大한 領導者)	Uridanggwa uri inmin-ŭi widaehan ryŏngdoja	Great Leader of our Party and of our Nation	In use since 1994.	
위대한 장군님 (偉大한 將軍님)	Widaehan changgunnim	Great General	In use since 1994.	
경애하는 장군님 (敬愛하는 將軍님)	Kyŏngaehanŭn changgunnim	Beloved and Respected General	In use since 1994.	
위대한 수령 (偉大한 首領)	Widaehan Suryŏng	Great Leader	When Kim Il Sung was alive, this title was used only to refer to him.	
경애하는 수령 (敬愛하는 首領)	Kyŏngaehanŭn Suryŏng	Beloved and Respected Leader	When Kim Il Sung was alive, this title was used only to refer to him.	
백전백승의 강철의 령장 (百戰百勝의 鋼鐵의 靈將)	Paekchŏnbaeksŭngŭi kangch'ŏrŭi ryŏngjang	Ever-Victorious, Iron-Willed Commander	In use since 1997 after the 3-year mourning for Kim Il Sung ended.	
사회주의 태양 (社會主義 太陽)	Sahoejuŭi T'aeyang	Sun of Socialism	In use since 1997 after the 3-year mourning for Kim Il Sung ended.	
민족의 태양 (民族의 太陽)	Minjokŭi T'aeyang	Sun of the Nation	In use since 1997 after the 3-year mourning for Kim Il Sung ended.	
삶의 태양 (삶의 太陽)	Salmŭi T'aeyang	The Great Sun of Life	In use since 1997 after the 3-year mourning for Kim Il Sung ended.	
민족의 위대한 태양 (民族의 偉大한 太陽)	Minjokŭi widaehan T'aeyang	Great Sun of The Nation	In use since 1999 after the new DPRK constitution was accepted in 1998.	
민족의 어버이 (民族의 어버이)	Minjok-ŭi Ŏbŏi	Father of the Nation	In use since 1999 after the new DPRK constitution was accepted in 1998.	
21세기의 세계 수령 (21世紀의 世界 首領)	Ishibil-segi-ŭi Segye Suryŏng	World Leader of The 21st Century	In use since 2000.	
불세출의 령도자 (不世出의 領導者)	Pulsech'urŭi ryŏngdoja	Peerless Leader	In use since 2000.	
21세기 찬란한 태양 (21世紀 燦爛한 太陽)	Ishibil-segi ch'allanhan t'aeyang	Bright Sun of the 21st Century	In use since 2000.	
21세기 위대한 태양 (21世紀 偉大한 太陽)	Ishibil-segi widaehan t'aeyang	Great Sun of the 21st Century	In use since 2000.	
21세기 향도자 (21世紀 嚮導者)	Ishibil-segi Hyangdoja	Leader of the 21st Century	In use since 2000.	
희세의 정치가 (稀世의 政治家)	Hŭiseŭi chŏngch'iga	Amazing Politician	In use since 2000.	
천출위인 (天出偉人)	Ch'ŏnch'urwiin	Great Man, Who Descended From Heaven	In use since 2000.	
천출명장 (天出明將)	Ch'ŏnch'ulmyŏngjang	Glorious General, Who Descended From Heaven	In use since 2000.	
민족의 최고영수 (民族의 最高領袖)	Minjok-ŭi ch'oegoyŏngsu	Supreme Leader of the Nation	In use since 2000.	
주체의 찬란한 태양 (主體의 燦爛한 太陽)	Chuch'e-ŭi ch'allanhan t'aeyang	Bright Sun of Juche	In use since 2000.	
당과 인민의 수령 (黨과 人民의 首領)	Tanggwa Inmin-ŭi Suryŏng	Leader of the Party and the People		
위대한 원수님 (偉大한 元帥님)	Widaehan Wŏnsunim	Great Marshal		
무적필승의 장군 (無敵必勝의 將軍)	Mujŏkp'ilsŭng-ŭi changgun	Invincible and Triumphant General		
경애하는 아버지 (敬愛하는 아버지)	Kyŏngaehanŭn Abŏji	Dear Father		
21세기의 향도성 (21世紀의 嚮導星)	Ishibil-segi-ŭi Hyangdosŏng	Guiding Star of the 21st Century		
실천가형의 위인 (實踐家型의 偉人)	Silch'ŏn'gahyŏng-ŭi wiin	Great Man, Who Is a Man of Deeds		
위대한 수호자 (偉大한 守護者)	Widaehan Suhoja	Great Defender		
구원자 (救援者)	Kuwŏnja	Saviour		
혁명의 수뇌부 (革命의 首腦部)	Hyŏngmyŏng-ŭi Sunoebu	Mastermind of the Revolution		
혁명적 동지애의 최고화신 (革命的 同志愛의 最高化身)	Hyŏngmyŏngjŏk Tongjiaeŭi Ch'oegohwasin	Highest Incarnation of the Revolutionary Comradeship		
각하 (閣下)	Kak'a	His Excellency		
주체조선의 영원한 수령	Chuch'ech'osŏn-ŭi Yŏngwŏnhan Suryŏng	Eternal Leader of Juche Korea	Established by a line in the preamble to the Constitution, as amended on 30 June 2016.	

== See also ==
=== Held titles ===
- Chairman of the National Defence Commission of North Korea
- General Secretary of the Workers' Party of Korea
- Supreme Commander of the Korean People's Army
- Eternal leaders of North Korea

=== Related ===
- List of Kim Il Sung's titles
- List of Kim Jong Un's titles
