= What Now =

What Now may refer to:

== Albums ==
- What, Now? (Peter Hammill album), 2001
- What Now? (Kenny Wheeler album), 2005
- What Now (Sylvan Esso album), 2017
- What Now (Brittany Howard album), 2024

== Songs ==
- "What Now" (song), 2012 song by Rihanna
- "What Now", 1963 song by Adam Faith
- "What Now", 1964 song by Gene Chandler
- "What Now", 1966 song by Tony Barber
- "What Now", 1967 song by Tommy McCook
- "What Now!", 2007 song by Moka Only and Def3 from the album Dog River

== Other ==
- What Now (TV programme), New Zealand children's TV programme
- What Now (film), 2015

== See also ==
- "So What Now", a song on the 2017 The Shins album, Heartworms
- Now What (disambiguation)
