= Ryan Duffy (journalist) =

American journalist

Ryan Duffy is a journalist and correspondent best known for his work with Vice Media, including accompanying Dennis Rodman and the Harlem Globetrotters on a visit to North Korea in 2013. Duffy began his career at Vice as an intern while studying journalism at New York University. In 2012, Duffy appeared on Forbes' 30 under 30 list. In 2015, he started a series of short documentary reports with The Huffington Post titled Now What with Ryan Duffy.

Ryan was also the vocalist in the NYC punk band, Dear Tonight. They released several records and went on tour in Europe and the US.

== North Korea trip ==
In 2013, as a Vice journalist Duffy accompanied Dennis Rodman and the Harlem Globetrotters on a visit to North Korea, a move which garnered criticism from the diplomatic community and the journalistic world. Along with Rodman and the Globetrotters, Duffy competed in a basketball exhibition game against the North Korean national team.

After meeting supreme leader Kim Jong-un, Duffy observed that "the leader was 'socially awkward' and didn't make eye contact when shaking hands".

While in Pyongyang, Duffy and the other members of the Vice crew attended a lavish dinner hosted by Kim Jong Un. "It was the most surreal experience of my life," Mojica said. Jason Mojica, the show's executive producer, tweeted just prior to the dinner: "Um... so Kim Jong Un just got the #VICEonHBO crew wasted... no really, that happened." McCarthy told the Associated Press: "Dinner was an epic feast. Felt like about 10 courses in total. I'd say the winners were the smoked turkey and sushi, though we had the Pyongyang cold noodles earlier in the trip and that's been the runaway favorite so far." Duffy, McCarthy, and the others were criticized on social media and on news sites for Tweets they posted and comments made to the press praising their cuisine, in lieu of the fact that 150,000 and 2,000,000 North Koreans died of starvation in a famine between 1994 and 1998. The website Gawker posted intermingling tweets and photos of Mojica and his colleagues with images of starving infants and children on the verge of death. New York Magazine commented: "Aside from the brutal slave-labor camps, the routine rape and torture of political prisoners, mass starvation extreme enough to induce episodes of cannibalism... North Korea sounds like a blast!" The New York Times has reported that as many as two million North Koreans have died of starvation.

== Vice Sports ==
In 2014, Vice launched Vice Sports with Duffy as publisher, but Duffy left the project as it debuted. Duffy had also been slated to host the channel's Vice World of Sports docuseries.

== Now What with Ryan Duffy ==
In October 2015, as part of a slate of 12 new shows, The Huffington Post launched the docuseries Now What with Ryan Duffy. Site founder Arianna Huffington cited the riots in Baltimore following the death of Freddie Gray as an example of the kinds of solution-based situations Duffy's program would address, criticizing existing coverage as creating "copycat crimes instead of copycat solutions."
