= List of Kim Il Sung's titles =

Kim Il Sung, the former leader of North Korea, held many titles and offices during his lifetime. Despite his death in 1994, he is currently the Eternal President of the Democratic People's Republic of Korea.

== Usage in North Korean media ==
When he is mentioned in North Korean media and publications, he is most commonly referred to as "Great Leader Comrade Kim Il Sung" (위대한 수령 김일성동지) or "Leader" (수령님).

When his name is written, it is always emphasized by a special bold font or in a larger font size, for example: "Great Leader Comrade Kim Il Sung is the Founder of the Socialist Cause of Juche, the Founder of Socialist Korea" or "Great Leader Comrade Kim Il Sung is the Founder of the Socialist Cause of Juche, the Founder of Socialist Korea."

== List of official titles and offices ==
=== Official titles ===
Chosŏn'gŭl (Hancha)	DPRK McCune–Reischauer	English	Comment	References
공화국의 영원한 주석	Konghwagugŭi Yŏngwŏnhan Chusŏk	Eternal President of the Republic	Appointed at the 1st Session of the 10th Supreme People's Assembly on 5 September 1998.	
조선민주주의인민공화국 대원수	Chosŏn Minjujuŭi Inmin Konghwaguk Taewŏnsu	Generalissimo of the Democratic People's Republic of Korea	Promoted on 13 April 1992.	

=== Held offices and titles ===
Chosŏn'gŭl (Hancha)	DPRK McCune–Reischauer	English	Tenure	Comment	References
Party
조선로동당 중앙위원회 위원		Member of the Central Committee of the Workers' Party of Korea	October 1946 – 8 July 1994	Elected at the 1st to 6th Congress of the WPK.	
조선로동당 중앙위원회 정치위원회 위원		Member of the Political Committee of the Central Committee of the Workers' Party of Korea	October 1946 – 1956		
조선로동당 중앙위원회 상임위원회 위원		Member of the Standing Committee of the Central Committee of the Workers' Party of Korea	1956–1961		
조선로동당 중앙위원회 정치위원회 위원장		Chairman of the Political Committee of the Central Committee of the Workers' Party of Korea			
조선로동당 중앙위원회 위원장		Chairman of the Central Committee of the Workers' Party of Korea	30 June 1949 – 12 October 1966		
조선로동당 중앙위원회 총비서	Chosŏn Rodongdang Ch'ongbisŏ	General Secretary of the Central Committee of the Workers' Party of Korea	12 October 1966 – 8 July 1994	Elected at the 14th Plenary Session of the 4th Party Central Committee, re-elected at 5th and 6th Congresses of the WPK.	
State
북조선림시인민위원회 위원장		Chairman of the Provisional People's Committee of North Korea	8 February 1946 – August 1946		
북조선인민위원회의 위원장		Chairman of the North Korean People's Committee	August 1946 – September 1948		
내각수상		Premier of the Cabinet of the DPRK	9 September 1948 – 28 December 1972		
조선민주주의인민공화국 주석	Chosŏn Minjujuŭi Inmin Konghwaguk Chusŏk	President of the DPRK	28 December 1972 – 8 July 1994	In accordance with the new Socialist Constitution of the DPRK adopted at the 1st session of the 5th Supreme People's Assembly.	
조선민주주의인민공화국 국방위원회 위원장		Chairman of the National Defence Commission of the DPRK	28 December 1972 – 9 April 1993		
Army
조선인민군 최고사령관		Supreme Commander of the Korean People's Army	4 July 1950 – 24 December 1991		

== List of propagated titles ==
Chosŏn'gŭl (Hancha)	DPRK McCune–Reischauer	English	Comment	References
수령님	Suryŏngnim	Leader	Used exclusively in reference to Kim Il Sung without using his name.	
경애하는 수령님	Kyŏngaehanŭn Suryŏngnim	Respected Leader	Used exclusively in reference to Kim Il Sung without using his name.	
어버이수령님	Ŏbŏi Suryŏngnim	Fatherly Leader	Used exclusively in reference to Kim Il Sung without using his name.	
위대한 수령님	Widaehan Suryŏngnim	Great Leader	Used exclusively in reference to Kim Il Sung without using his name.	
위대한 수령	Widaehan Suryŏng	Great Leader	Used exclusively for Kim Il Sung, prefixed to his name.	
수령	Suryŏng	Leader		
민족의 태양	Minjogŭi T'aeyang	Sun of the Nation		
주석님	Chusŏngnim	President	More common when referring to him internationally (Chongryon, Uriminzokkiri)	
20세기의 태양	Isipsegiŭi T'aeyang	Sun of the 20th Century		
주체조선의 영원한 수령	Chuch'e Chosŏnŭi Yŏngwŏnhan Suryŏng	Eternal Leader of Juche Korea	Established by a line in the preamble to the Constitution, as amended on 30 June 2016.	

== See also ==
=== Held titles ===
- Chairman of the Workers' Party of Korea
- General Secretary of the Workers' Party of Korea
- Premier of the Cabinet of the DPRK
- Chairman of the National Defence Commission of North Korea
- Supreme Commander of the Korean People's Army
- Eternal leaders of North Korea

=== Related ===
- List of Kim Jong-il's titles
- List of Kim Jong-un's titles
