= International School of Berne =

International school in Gümlingen, Switzerland

Coordinates: 46.9302025°N 7.5112716°E

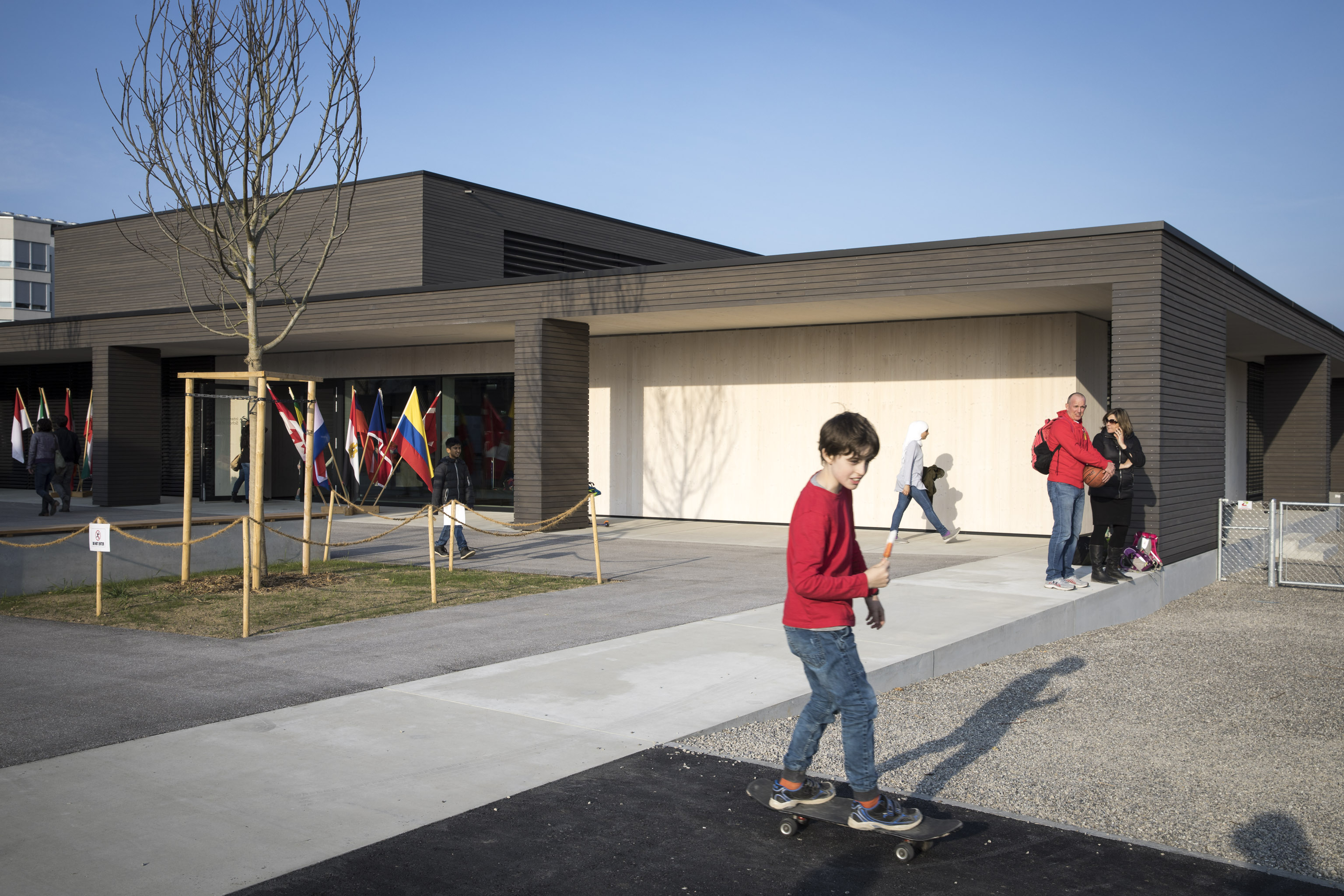

Location
- Allmendingenweg 9, 3073 Gümligen; Bern, Switzerland

Information
- Motto: We welcome and connect. We nurture and inspire. We challenge and prepare.
- Established: 1961
- Category: Day School
- Age: 3 to 18
- Mascot: Bear
- Accreditation: Council of International Schools New England Association of Schools and Colleges
- Affiliation: International Baccalaureate Swiss Group of International Schools Council of International Schools New England Association of Schools and Colleges
- Website: https://isberne.ch/

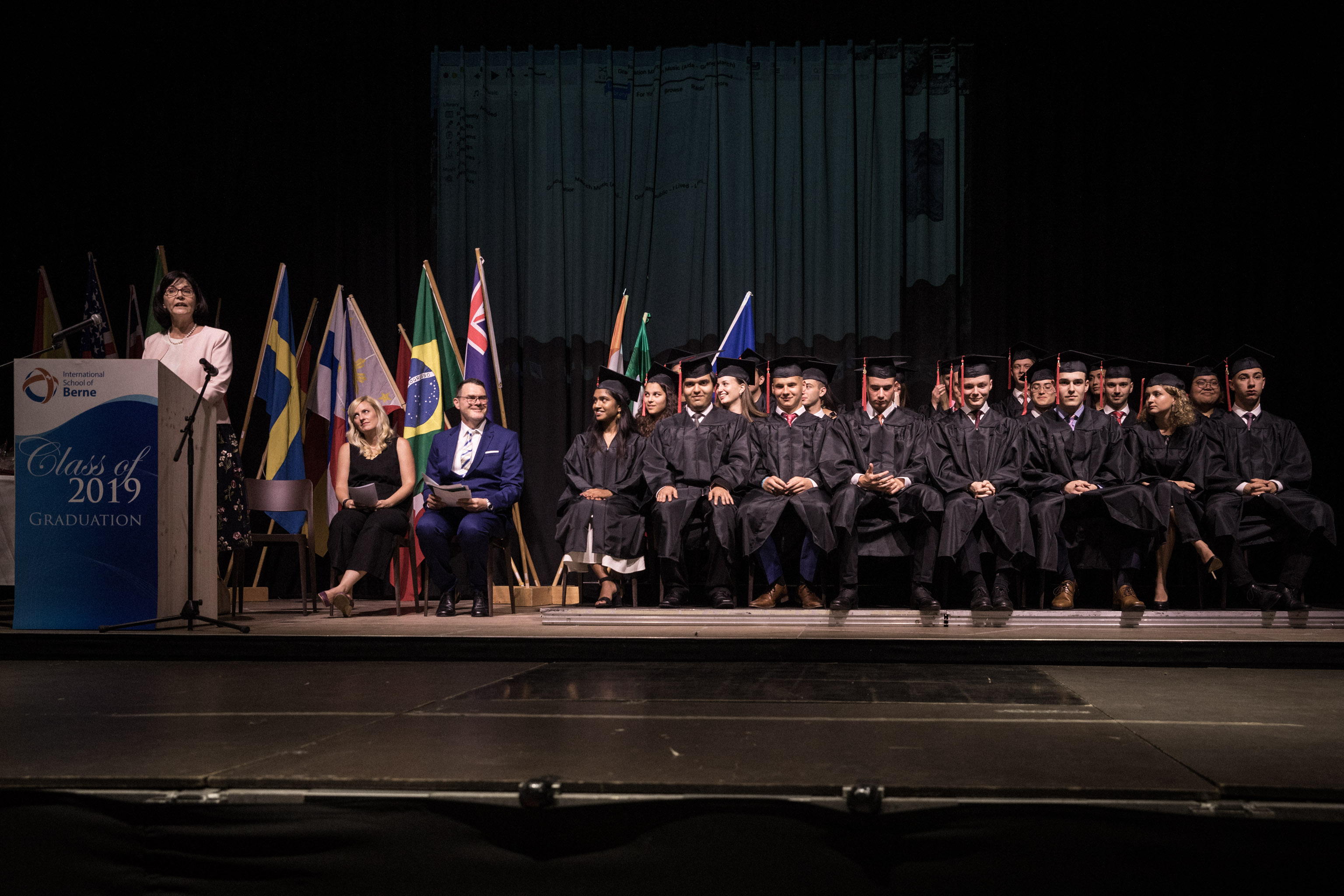
Graduation ceremony for the class of 2019.

International School of Berne (ISBerne) is an international school in Gümligen, Muri bei Bern, Switzerland. Founded in 1961, It serves primarily international students aged 3 to 18 and offers 2 diploma options. The curriculum is the International Baccalaureate and is taught in English. Two official Swiss languages, German and French, are taught as additional languages.

In August 2015, the groundbreaking for its new campus occurred. In April 2017, the school moved to the new campus.

Kim Jong Un, dictator of North Korea, attended the school.

ISBerne is a member of the Swiss Group of International Schools.

== Accreditation ==
The International School of Berne was first accredited in 1984 by the Council of International Schools (CIS) and the New England Association of Schools and Colleges (NEASC) and was re-accredited in 1994, 2004 and 2015. ISBerne is currently in the reaccreditation process, having completed the CIS/NEASC Preparatory Visit virtually in February 2021.

As a private International School following only the English-taught International Baccalaureate programmes, ISBerne's secondary education programme, which includes both middle and high school. The school offers the International Baccalaureate (IB) diploma and the ISBerne Diploma. The International Baccalaureate Diploma is recognised and accepted by Universities in Switzerland to some degrees only.

The NEASC accreditation also is the validating body of the ISBerne Diploma, a United States equivalent High School Diploma.
