= List of Kim Jong Un's titles =

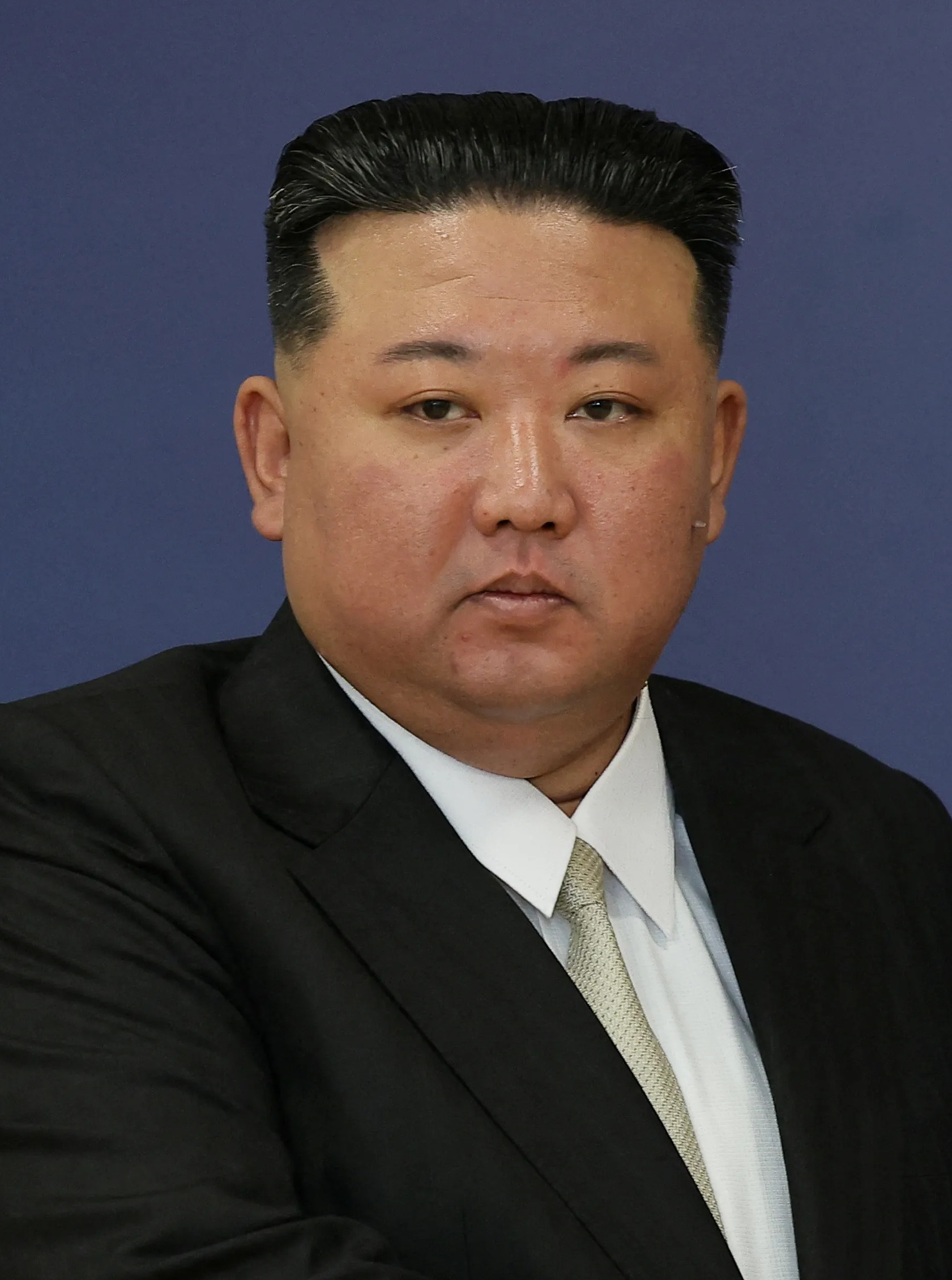
Kim Jong Un, North Korean autocrat by hereditary succession, in 2023

Kim Jong Un, the current Supreme Leader of North Korea, holds many titles and offices. Currently, he holds the highest titles in the party, state and army, being:

- General Secretary of the Workers' Party of Korea
- Chairman of the Central Military Commission of the Workers' Party of Korea
- President of the State Affairs of the Democratic People's Republic of Korea
- Supreme Commander of the Armed Forces of the Democratic People's Republic of Korea

== Usage in North Korean media ==
As of 2024, when Kim Jong Un is mentioned in North Korean media and publications, he is most commonly referred to as "Respected Comrade Kim Jong Un" (Korean: 경애하는 김정은동지), "Respected Comrade General Secretary" (경애하는 총비서동지), or "Marshal" (원수님).

Like his grandfather and father, when he is mentioned in North Korean media and publications, it is always accompanied by one or more of these titles. When his name is written, it is always emphasised by a special bold font or in a larger font size, for example: "Respected Comrade Kim Jong Un Clarifies Plan to Form Area of Riverside Terraced Houses around Pothong Gate".

His honorific titles would be used as a description added to his name or affectionate title. For example, "Comrade Kim Jong Un, who is an outstanding successor and leader of the Juche revolution, the symbol of strength of our state and the banner of all victory and glory" (주체혁명의 유일무이한 계승자이시고 령도자이시며 우리 국가의 강대성의 상징이시고 모든 승리와 영광의 기치이신 김정은동지).

== List of official titles and offices ==
=== Current titles and offices ===
| Chosŏn'gŭl (Hancha) | DPRK McCune–Reischauer | English | Tenure | Comment | References |
Party
| 조선로동당 총비서 (朝鮮勞動黨 總秘書) | Chosŏn Rodongdang Ch'ongbisŏ | General Secretary of the Workers' Party of Korea | 10 January 2021 – incumbent | Elected at the 8th Congress of the Workers' Party of Korea | |
| 조선로동당 중앙위원회 정치국 상무위원회 위원 (朝鮮勞動黨 中央委員會 政治局 常務委員會 委員) | chosŏllodongdang chungangwiwŏnhoe chŏngch'iguk sangmuwiwŏnhoe wiwŏn | Member of the Presidium of the Politburo of the Workers' Party of Korea | 11 April 2012 – incumbent | Elected at 4th Conference of the WPK, re-elected at 7th and 8th Congress of the WPK. | |
| 조선로동당 중앙위원회 정치국 위원 (朝鮮勞動黨 中央委員會 政治局 委員) | chosŏllodongdang chungangwiwŏnhoe chŏngch'iguk wiwŏn | Member of the Politburo of the Workers' Party of Korea | 11 April 2012 – incumbent | Elected at 4th Conference of the WPK, re-elected at 7th and 8th Congress of the WPK | |
| 조선로동당 중앙위원회 위원 (朝鮮勞動黨 中央委員會 委員) | chosŏllodongdang chungangwiwŏnhoe wiwŏn | Member of the Central Committee of the Workers' Party of Korea | 28 September 2010 – incumbent | Elected at the 3rd Conference of the WPK, re-elected at 4th Conference, 7th and 8th Congress of the WPK. | |
| 조선로동당 중앙군사위원회 위원장 (朝鮮勞動黨 中央軍事委員會 委員長) | chosŏllodongdang chunganggunsawiwŏnhoe wiwŏnjang | Chairman of the Central Military Commission of the Workers' Party of Korea | 11 April 2012 – incumbent | Elected at 4th Conference of the WPK, re-elected at 7th and 8th Congress of the WPK | |
State
| 조선민주주의인민공화국 국무위원장 (朝鮮民主主義人民共和國 國務委員長) | Chosŏnminjujuŭiinmin'gonghwaguk kungmuwiwŏnjang | President of the State Affairs of the DPRK (lit. Chairman of the State Affairs Commission of the DPRK) | 29 June 2016 – incumbent | Elected at the 4th Meeting of the 13th Supreme Peoples' Assembly. | |
Army
| 조선민주주의인민공화국무력 최고사령관 (朝鮮民主主義人民共和國武力 最高司令官) | Chosŏnminjujuŭiinmin'gonghwaguk muryŏkch'oegosaryŏnggwan | Supreme Commander of the Armed Forces of the Democratic People's Republic of Korea | 30 December 2011 – incumbent | Appointed as per Kim Jong Il's final instructions. | |
| 조선인민군 최고사령관 (朝鮮人民軍 最高司令官) | Chosŏniinmin'gun ch'oegosaryŏnggwan | Supreme Commander of the Korean People's Army | 30 December 2011 – incumbent | Appointed as per Kim Jong Il's final instructions. | |
| 조선민주주의인민공화국 원수 (朝鮮民主主義人民共和國 元帥) | Chosŏnminjujuŭiinmin'gonghwaguk Wonsu | Marshal of the Democratic People's Republic of Korea | Promoted on the 18 July 2012. | | |

=== Previously held titles and offices ===
| Chosŏn'gŭl (Hancha) | DPRK McCune–Reischauer | English | Tenure | Comment | References |
Party
| 조선로동당 중앙군사위원회 부위원장 (朝鮮勞動黨 中央軍事委員會 副委員長) | Chosŏn Rodongdang chunganggunsawiwŏnhoe puwiwŏnchang | Vice-chairman of the Central Military Commission of the Workers' Party of Korea | 28 September 2010 – 11 April 2012 | Elected at the 3rd Conference of the Workers' Party of Korea. | |
| 조선로동당 제1비서 (朝鮮勞動黨 第1秘書) | Chosŏn Rodongdang cheilbisŏ | First Secretary of the Workers' Party of Korea | 11 April 2012 – 9 May 2016 | Elected at 4th Conference of the Workers' Party of Korea. | |
| 조선로동당 위원장 (朝鮮勞動黨 委員長) | Chosŏn Rodongdang wiwŏnjang | Chairman of the Workers' Party of Korea | 9 May 2016 – 10 January 2021 | Elected at the 7th Congress of the Workers' Party of Korea. | |
State
| 조선민주주의인민공화국 국방위원회 제1위원장 (朝鮮民主主義人民共和國 國防委員會 第1委員長) | Chosŏnminjujuŭiinminkonghwaguk kukpangwiwŏnhoe cheilwiwŏnjang | First Chairman of the National Defence Commission of the DPRK | 13 April 2012 – 29 June 2016 | Elected at the 5th session of the 12th Supreme Peoples' Assembly. | |
Army
| 조선인민군 대장 (朝鮮人民軍 大將) | Chosŏninmin'gun daejang | General of the Korean People's Army | 27 September 2010 – 18 July 2012 | Conferred upon Supreme Commander of the Korean People's Army Order No.0051 | |

== List of propagated titles ==
| Chosŏn'gŭl (Hancha) | DPRK McCune–Reischauer | English | Comment | References |
|---|---|---|---|---|
| 원수님 | Wŏnsunim | Marshal | Used to refer to Kim Jong Un without mentioning his name. | |
| 경애하는 원수님 | Kyŏngaehanŭn Wŏnsunim | Dear Respected Marshal | Used to refer to Kim Jong Un without mentioning his name. | |
| 아버지 원수님 | Abŏji Wŏnsunim | Father Marshal | Same as above, but is only rarely used in news articles and media pertaining to the youth. The earliest instance of this is from a song called 'Oh dear Marshal' (아 그리운 원수님) by the Moranbong Band in 2016. | |
| 친근한 어버이 | Ch'in'gŭnhan ŏbŏi | Friendly Father or Friendly Parent | A title of a popular propaganda song of the same name, it has also been used since in various publications and media to refer to Kim Jong Un. | |
| 최고령도자 | Choegoryŏngdoja | Supreme Leader | Used as "Supreme Leader of our Party and our people" (우리 당과 우리 인민의 최고령도자) in various iterations from 2011 to 2017, "Supreme Leader of our Party, state and armed forces" (우리 당과 국가,무력의 최고령도자) from 2017 to 2021. Fell completely out of use after the 8th Congress of the WPK. | |
| 우리 당과 국가, 무력의 최고령도자 | Uridanggwa kukkawa mulyeogŭi choegoryŏngdoja | Supreme Leader of our Party, State and Armed Forces | Often used after his full list of titles is mentioned from 2017 to 2021. | |
| 경애하는 최고사령관동지 | Choegosaryŏnggwan | Respected Supreme Commander | Used in the military without mentioning his name. | |
| 경애하는 최고령도자동지 | Choegoryŏngdojadongji | Respected Comrade Supreme Leader | Used without mentioning his name. Used from 2017 to 2021. | |
| 경애하는 총비서동지 | Chongbisŏdongji | Respected Comrade General Secretary | In use since the 8th Congress of the WPK, where he was elected General Secretary of the WPK, in 2021. | |
| 자애로운 아버지 | Chaaeroun Abŏji | Beloved Father | | |
| 주체조선의 태양 | Chuch'ejosŏnŭi t'aeyang | Sun of Juche Korea | | |
| 장군 | Janggun | General | | |
| 청년대장 | Chŏngnyŏndaejang | Young General | He was often called this during his hereditary succession campaign. | |
| 영명한 동지 | Yŏngmyŏnghan dongji | Brilliant Comrade | He was often called this during his hereditary succession campaign. | |
| 각하 | Kakha | His Excellency | Used by foreign dignitaries in international communication. | |
| 주체혁명의 탁월한 령도자 | Chuch'ehyŏngmyŏngŭi t'agwŏrhan ryŏngdoja | Outstanding Leader of the Juche Revolution | | |
| 주체혁명의 유일무이한 계승자이시고 령도자 | Chuch'ehyŏngmyŏngŭi yuilmuihan kyesŭngjaishigo ryŏngdoja | The only and unique successor and leader of the Juche Revolution | | |
| 우리 국가의 강대성의 상징 | Uri kukkaŭi kangdaesŏngŭi sangjing | A symbol of the mightyness of our country | | |
| 모든 승리와 영광의 기치 | Modŭn sŭngniwa yŏnggwangŭi kich'i | Banner of all victory and glory | | - |
| 위대한 령도자 | Widaehan ryŏngdoja | Great Leader | Used on very rare occasions, usually more common in slogans during major national events such as elections at party congresses. | |
| 절세의 위인 | Chŏlseŭi wiin | Peerlessly Great Man | | |
| 우리 당과 국가,무력의 위대한 수반 | Uri tanggwa kukkiwa maryŏŭi widaehan suban | Great Leader of our Party, State and Armed Forces | Used after the 8th Congress of the WPK in 2021. | |

== See also ==
=== Held titles ===
- General Secretary of the Workers' Party of Korea
  - Formerly: Chairman of the Workers' Party of Korea
- President of the State Affairs Commission of the DPRK
  - Formerly: Chairman of the National Defence Commission of North Korea
- Supreme Commander of the Armed Forces of North Korea

=== Related ===
- List of Kim Il Sung's titles
- List of Kim Jong Il's titles
