= Now What with Ryan Duffy =

- Genre: Docuseries
- Presented by: Ryan Duffy
- No. of seasons: 1
- No. of episodes: 10

Original release
- Network: The Huffington Post
- Release: October 15, 2015

Now What with Ryan Duffy is an online docuseries fronted by former Vice correspondent Ryan Duffy, focused on global problems and their innovative solutions; the show premiered online on 15 October 2015, with an initial run of 10 episodes.

The show was one of a slate of 12 new shows added by The Huffington Post in 2015 as part of their strategy of video expansion under AOL New Front; site founder Arianna Huffington cited the riots in Baltimore following the death of Freddie Gray as an example of the kinds of solution-based situations Duffy's program would address, criticizing existing coverage as creating "copycat crimes instead of copycat solutions." Duffy describes the show as having a two-act structure, first exploring a global problem, then a second act exploring the solution and a character-driven depiction of the people working on the solution.
