= Kim Jong Un =

Leader of North Korea since 2011

Respected Comrade Kim Jong Un
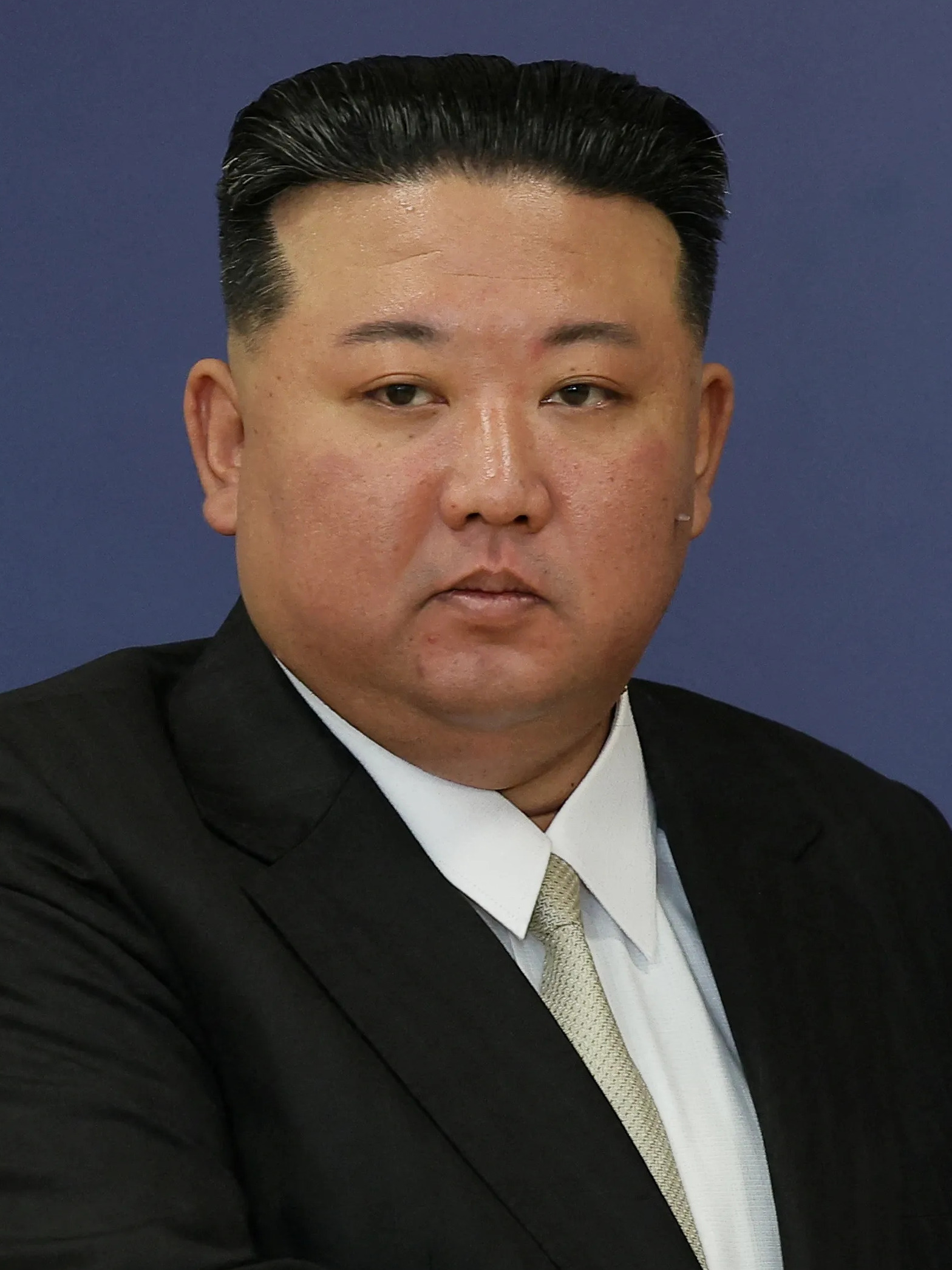
- Kim in 2023

General Secretary of the Workers' Party of Korea (Note: Kim Jong Un held the same position under the title of "First Secretary" from 11 April 2012 until 9 May 2016 and "Chairman" from 9 May 2016 until 10 January 2021.)
- Incumbent
- Assumed office 11 April 2012
- Preceded by: Kim Jong Il

President of the State Affairs Commission
- Incumbent
- Assumed office 29 June 2016
- Premier: Pak Pong-ju; Kim Jae-ryong; Kim Tok-hun; Pak Thae-song
- First Vice President: Choe Ryong-hae; Jo Yong-won
- Preceded by: Himself (as First Chairman of the National Defense Commission)

First Chairman of the National Defense Commission
- In office 11 April 2012 – 29 June 2016
- Vice Chairman: Kim Yong-chun; Ri Yong-mu; Jang Song-thaek; O Kuk-ryol; Choe Ryong-hae; Hwang Pyong-so
- Premier: Choe Yong-rim; Pak Pong-ju
- Preceded by: Kim Jong Il (as Chairman)
- Succeeded by: Himself (as President of the State Affairs Commission)

Member of the Supreme People's Assembly
- In office 9 April 2009 – 11 April 2019
- Constituency: Paektusan 111

Personal details
- Born: 8 January c. 1982–1984 (age 42–44) North Korea
- Party: Workers' Party of Korea
- Spouse: Ri Sol-ju (m. 2009)
- Children: 3 (Note: One daughter confirmed, which is Kim Ju Ae, while the other two are unconfirmed.)
- Parents: Kim Jong Il; Ko Yong-hui
- Relatives: Kim family
- Education: Kim Il Sung University; Kim Il Sung Military University

Military service
- Allegiance: North Korea
- Branch/service: Korean People's Army
- Years of service: 2010–present
- Rank: Wonsu
- Kim's voice Kim speaking at the 2018 North Korea–United States Singapore Summit; Recorded 12 June 2018

Korean name
- Hangul: 김정은
- Hanja: 金正恩
- RR: Gim Jeongeun
- MR: Kim Chŏngŭn
- IPA: [kim dzʌŋ.ɯːn] (Note: 정은 is pronounced [tsʌŋ.ɯːn] in isolation.)
- Central institution membership: 2012–present: Member, Presidium of the Political Bureau of the 6th, 7th, 8th Central Committee of the Workers' Party of Korea; 2012–present: Member, Political Bureau of the 6th, 7th, 8th Central Committee of the Workers' Party of Korea; 2010–present: Member, 6th, 7th, 8th Central Committee of the Workers' Party of Korea; Other offices held: 2012–present: Chairman, Central Military Commission of the Workers' Party of Korea; 2010–2012: Vice Chairman, Central Military Commission of the Workers' Party of Korea; Supreme Leader of North Korea: ← Kim Jong Il; (Current holder)

Kim Jong Un (Note: Also transliterated as Kim Jong-un; English pronunciation: /ˌkɪm dʒɒŋˈʊn, -ˈuːn/ KIM jong-UUN, -OON; Korean: 김정은; pronounced [kim dʑʌŋ.ɯːn];.) (born 8 January c. 1982–1984) (Note: North Korean sources give Kim's birth date as 8 January 1982. His birth year is believed to be 1983 according to South Korean intelligence sources, and 1984 according to the US government. For more information, see § Early life.) is a North Korean politician and dictator who has been serving as the supreme leader of North Korea since 2011, following the death of his father, Kim Jong Il. He is the third ruler from the Kim family to lead the country, which was founded by his grandfather Kim Il Sung. Kim holds the positions of general secretary of the Workers' Party of Korea (WPK) (Note: As the leader of the Workers' Party of Korea, Kim held the titles of First Secretary from 2012 to 2016, Chairman from 2016 to 2021, and General Secretary since 2021.) and president of the State Affairs Commission, as well as the highest offices in the Korean People's Army. (Note: See List of Kim Jong Un's titles.)

The second of three children of Kim Jong Il and his mistress Ko Yong Hui, Kim studied at the International School of Berne in Switzerland before attending Kim Il Sung University between 2002 and 2007. From 2009, Kim was viewed as the successor to the North Korean leadership. Following his father's death in 2011, state television announced Kim as the "great successor to the revolutionary cause". He assumed various leadership posts, and also became member of the Presidium of the WPK Politburo, the highest decision-making body in the country. In July 2012, Kim was promoted to the highest rank of marshal in the Korean People's Army, consolidating his positions as commander-in-chief of the Armed Forces and Chairman of the Central Military Commission.

Like his father and grandfather before him, Kim rules North Korea as a repressive and totalitarian dictatorship, and his leadership has maintained the Kim family cult of personality. State media often refer to him as "Respected Comrade", "Marshal", and "Head of State". Kim's government has been accused of human rights violations. He reportedly ordered the purge and execution of several North Korean officials including his uncle, Jang Song-thaek, in 2013, and the assassination of his half-brother, Kim Jong-nam, in Malaysia in 2017. Kim Jong Un's ideology departed from his father's military-first Songun policy, professing a "people-first policy" and renewed commitment to communism. Kim has promoted the Byungjin policy of parallel development of the country's nuclear weapons program alongside the country's economy, named after the similar policy of Kim Il Sung. He has revived the structures of the WPK, expanding the party's power at the expense of the military leadership.

Kim oversaw the world's four most recent nuclear weapons tests (Note: North Korea conducted the only confirmed nuclear weapons tests in the 21st century. For unconfirmed allegations of nuclear testing that may have occurred more recently, see List of nuclear weapons tests § Alleged tests.) and extensive missile tests, including North Korea's first intercontinental ballistic missile. These heightened tensions with South Korea, the United States, and China, culminating in the 2017–2018 North Korea crisis. In 2018 and 2019, Kim took part in summits with Chinese President Xi Jinping and South Korean president Moon Jae-in and U.S. president Donald Trump, the first meetings between a North Korean and a U.S. head of state. Despite the brief thaw in relations, the negotiations ultimately broke down without progress on reunification of Korea or nuclear disarmament. He claimed success in combating the COVID-19 pandemic, with the country not reporting confirmed cases until May 2022, although some independent observers questioned this claim. In December 2023, Kim declared that North Korea formally abandoned efforts to reunify Korea and proposed the two hostile states theory, symbolically demolishing the Arch of Reunification. In June 2024, Kim signed a security and defense treaty with Russia, while supplying Russia with material for the Russo-Ukrainian war. In October, North Korea sent soldiers to assist Russian units in the Kursk campaign.

== Early life ==
North Korean authorities and state-run media state that Kim Jong Un was born on 8 January 1982. South Korean intelligence officials believe that the actual date was 1983. The US government lists his birth year as 1984, based on the passport he used while studying in Switzerland. Ko Yong Suk, Kim's aunt who defected to the United States in 1998, also claimed the 1984 birthdate, saying Kim was the same age as her son, who was a playmate from a young age. It is thought that Kim's official birth year was changed for symbolic reasons; 1982 marked the seventieth birthday of his grandfather Kim Il Sung, and forty years after the official birth of his father Kim Jong Il.

Kim Jong Un is the second of three children of Ko Yong Hui and Kim Jong Il; his elder brother, Kim Jong Chul, was born on 25 September 1981, while his younger sister, Kim Yo Jong, is believed to have been born in 1987. He is a grandson of Kim Il Sung, who was the founder of and led North Korea from its establishment in 1948 until his death in 1994. Kim is the first leader of North Korea to have been born a North Korean citizen; his father was born in the Soviet Union and his grandfather was born in Korea during the Japanese colonial period.

All of Kim Jong Il's children are said to have lived in Switzerland, as well as the mother of the two youngest sons, who lived in Geneva for some time. First reports said that Kim Jong Un attended the private International School of Berne in Gümligen in Switzerland under the name "Chol-pak" or "Pak-chol" from 1993 to 1998. In April 2012, new documents came to light indicating that Kim Jong Un had lived in Switzerland since 1991 or 1992, earlier than previously thought. The Laboratory of Anthropology and Anatomy at the University of Lyon, analyzed a picture of Kim Jong Un from 2012 and the picture of a student believed to be Kim, taken at the Liebefeld Steinhölzli school in 1999. Anthropometric facial comparison produced a 95% match, and the forensic anthropologists involved at the occasion expressed being convinced that the two photos depict the same person.

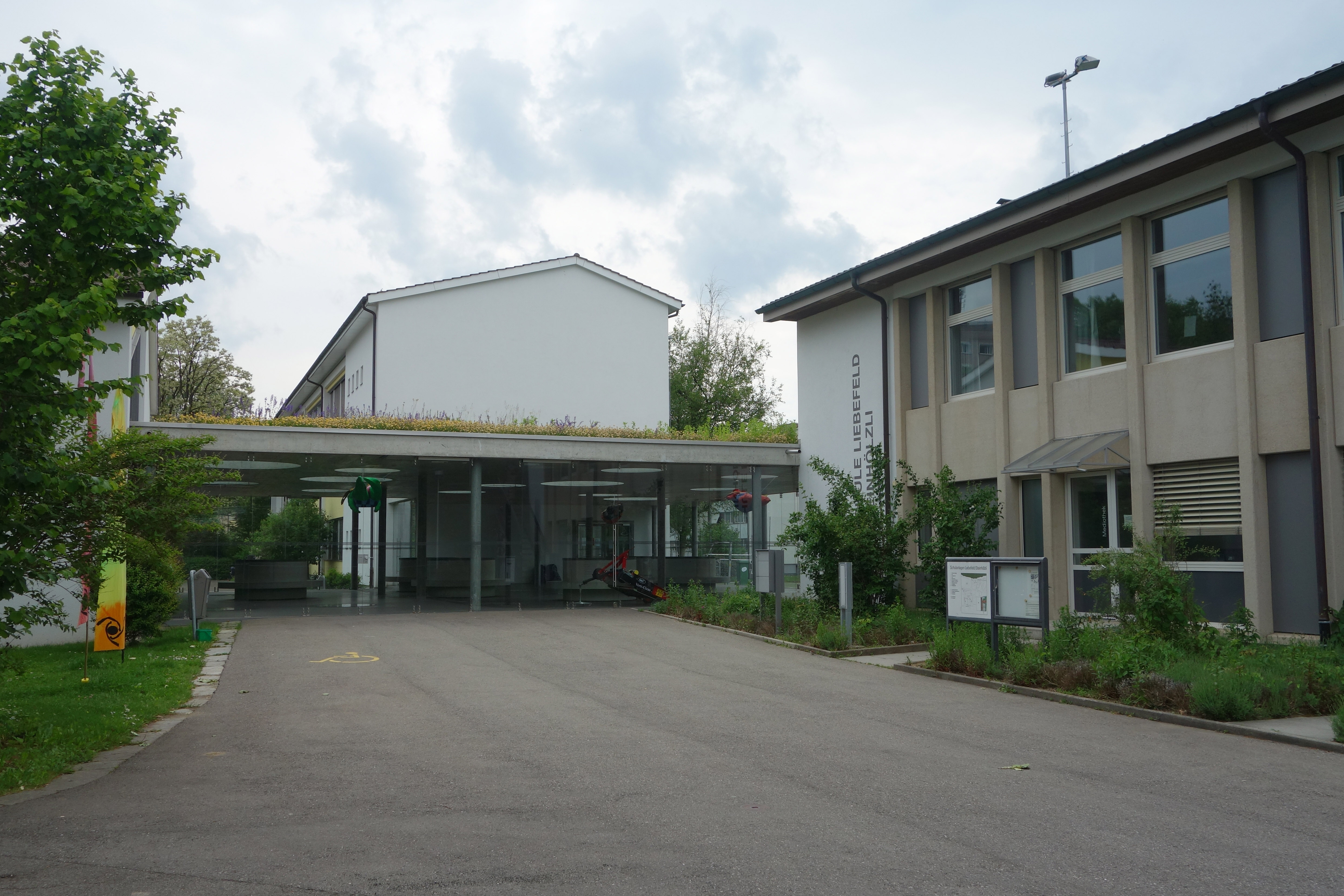
The Liebefeld-Steinhölzli public school in Köniz, Switzerland, reportedly attended by Kim Jong Un

Then-councilor Ueli Studer, representing the municipal school board of Köniz, Switzerland, confirmed that a North Korean student had attended the Liebefeld-Steinhölzli public school from August 1998 until 2000 fall. Kim was registered under the name "Pak-un" or "Un-pak" as the son of an employee of the North Korean embassy in Bern. He first attended a special class for foreign-language children and later attended the regular classes of the 6th, 7th, 8th and part of the final 9th year, leaving the school abruptly in the autumn of 2000. Former school headmaster Peter Burri described the North Korean teenager as "well-integrated, hardworking, and ambitious". However, his grades and attendance rating were reported to have been poor. The ambassador of North Korea in Switzerland, Ri Chol, had a close relationship with Kim Jong-un and acted as his mentor, and Kim was chaperoned by an older student, thought to be his bodyguard.

Kim was described by classmates as a shy child who was awkward with girls and indifferent to political issues. He distinguished himself in sports and had a fascination with the American National Basketball Association and Michael Jordan; a friend said he had been shown pictures of Kim with Kobe Bryant and Toni Kukoč. Another classmate said Kim had told him that he was the son of the leader of North Korea. The Washington Post reported in 2009 that Kim Jong Un's schoolfriends recalled he "spent hours doing meticulous pencil drawings" of Jordan. He was also obsessed with computer games, and was a fan of Jackie Chan action movies. His elder brother Kim Jong Chul attended the school with him.

Most analysts agree that Kim Jong Un attended Kim Il Sung University in Pyongyang from 2002 to 2007. Kim obtained two degrees, one in physics at Kim Il Sung University and another as an Army officer at the Kim Il Sung Military University.

In late February 2018, Reuters reported that Kim and his father had used forged passports—supposedly issued by Brazil and dated 26 February 1996—to apply for visas in various countries. Both 10-year passports carry a stamp saying "Embassy of Brazil in Prague". Kim Jong Un's passport records the name "Josef Pwag" and a date of birth of 1 February 1983.

For many years, only one confirmed photograph of Kim was known to exist outside North Korea, apparently taken in the mid-1990s, when he was eleven. Occasionally, other supposed images of him surfaced but were often disputed. In June 2010, shortly before he was given official posts and publicly introduced to the North Korean people, more pictures were released, taken when he was attending school in Switzerland. The first official image of him as an adult was a group photograph released on 30 September 2010, at the end of the party conference that effectively anointed him, in which he is seated in the front row, two places from his father. This was followed by newsreel footage of him attending the conference.

== Succession ==
=== Pre-2010 Party Conference speculation ===
Kim Jong Un's eldest half-brother, Kim Jong Nam, had been the favorite to succeed, but reportedly fell out of favor after 2001, when he was caught attempting to enter Japan using a fake passport to visit Tokyo Disneyland. Kim Jong Nam was killed in Malaysia in 2017 by suspected North Korean agents.

Kim Jong Il's former personal chef, Kenji Fujimoto, revealed details regarding Kim Jong Un, with whom he had a good relationship, stating that he was favored to be his father's successor. Fujimoto also said that Jong Un was favored by his father over his elder brother, Kim Jong Chul, reasoning that Jong Chul is too feminine in character, while Jong Un is "exactly like his father". Furthermore, Fujimoto stated that "if power is to be handed over then Jong Un is the best for it. He has superb physical gifts, is a big drinker and never admits defeat." Also, according to Fujimoto, Jong Un smokes Yves Saint Laurent cigarettes, loves Johnnie Walker whisky and has a Mercedes-Benz 600 luxury sedan. When Jong Un was 18, Fujimoto described an episode where Jong Un once questioned his lavish lifestyle and asked, "we are here, playing basketball, riding horses, riding jet skis, having fun together. But what of the lives of the average people?" On 15 January 2009, the South Korean news agency Yonhap reported that Kim Jong Il had appointed Kim Jong Un to be his successor.

On 8 March 2009, BBC News reported that Kim Jong Un was on the ballot for 2009 elections to the Supreme People's Assembly, the rubber stamp parliament of North Korea. Subsequent reports indicated that his name did not appear on the list of lawmakers, but he was later elevated to a mid-level position in the National Defense Commission, the highest decision-making body of the state and highest organisation of the North Korean military at that time.

From 2009, it was understood by foreign diplomatic services that Kim was to succeed his father Kim Jong Il as the head of the Korean Workers' Party and de facto leader of North Korea. He has been named as "Brilliant Comrade". His father had also asked embassy staff abroad to pledge loyalty to his son. There have also been reports that citizens in North Korea were encouraged to sing a newly composed "song of praise" to Kim Jong Un, in a similar fashion to that of praise songs relating to Kim Jong Il and Kim Il Sung. Later, in June, Kim was reported to have visited China secretly to "present himself" to the Chinese leadership. The Chinese foreign ministry has strongly denied that this visit occurred.

In September 2009, it was reported that Kim Jong Il had secured support for the succession plan, after a propaganda campaign. It is believed by some that Kim Jong Un was involved in the Cheonan sinking and the bombardment of Yeonpyeong to strengthen his military credentials and facilitate a successful transition of power from his father.

=== Vice Chairman of the Central Military Commission ===
Kim Jong Un was made a daejang (대장), the equivalent of a four-star general in the United States, on 27 September 2010, a day ahead of a rare Workers' Party of Korea conference in Pyongyang, the first time North Korean media had mentioned him by name and despite him having no previous military experience. Despite the promotion, no further details, including verifiable portraits of Kim, were released. On 28 September 2010, he was named vice chairman of the Central Military Commission and appointed to the Central Committee of the Workers' Party, in an apparent nod to become the successor to Kim Jong Il.

On 10 October 2010, Kim Jong Un was alongside his father when he attended the ruling Workers' Party's 65th-anniversary celebration. This was seen as confirming his position as the next leader of the Workers' Party. Unprecedented international press access was granted to the event, further indicating the importance of Kim Jong Un's presence. In January 2011, the government reportedly began purging around 200 protégés of both Kim Jong Un's uncle-in-law Jang Song Thaek and O Kuk Ryol, the vice chairman of the National Defence Commission, by either detention or execution to further prevent either man from rivaling Jong Un.

== Leader of North Korea ==
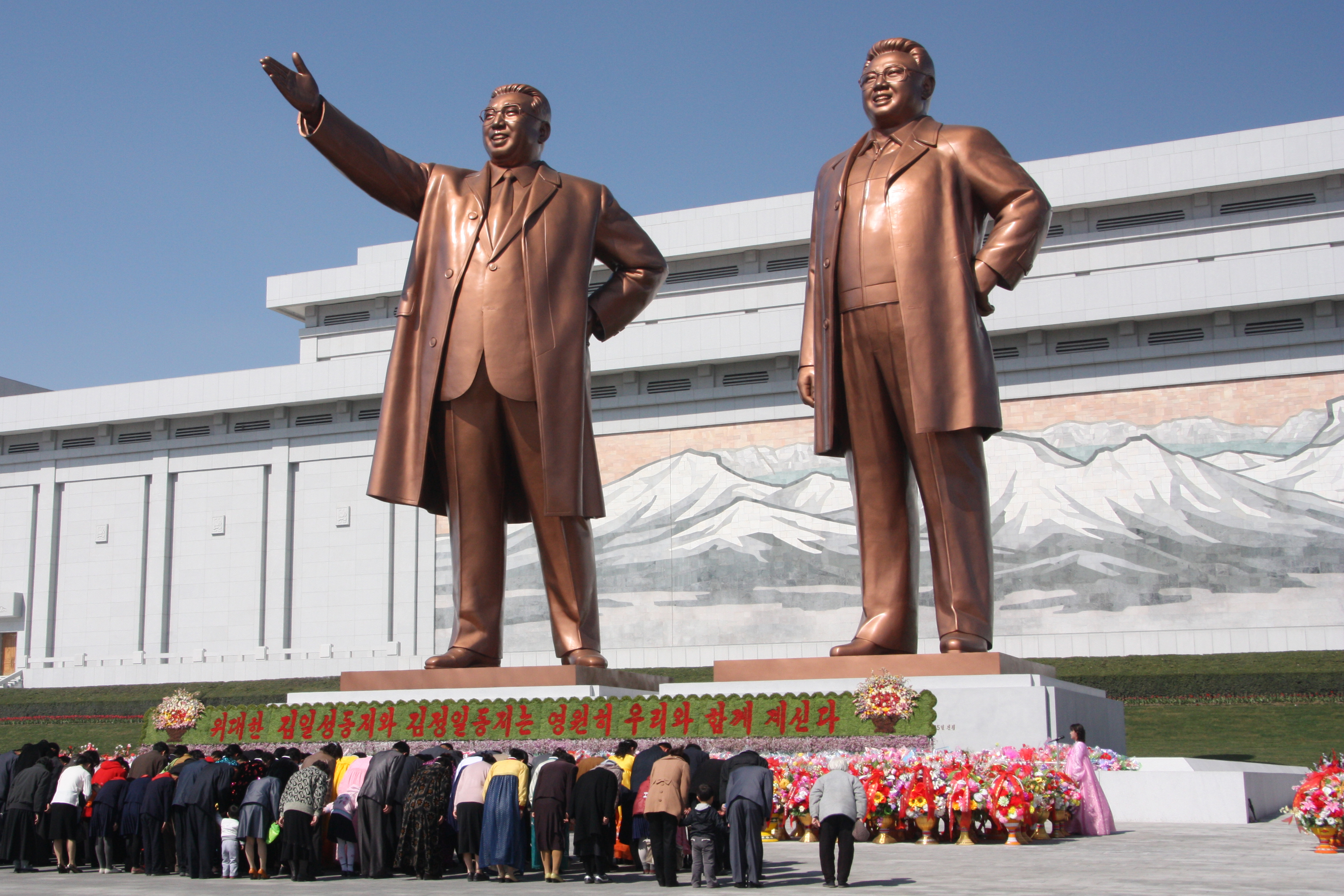
People bowing to the statues of Kim Il Sung and Kim Jong Il, April 2012

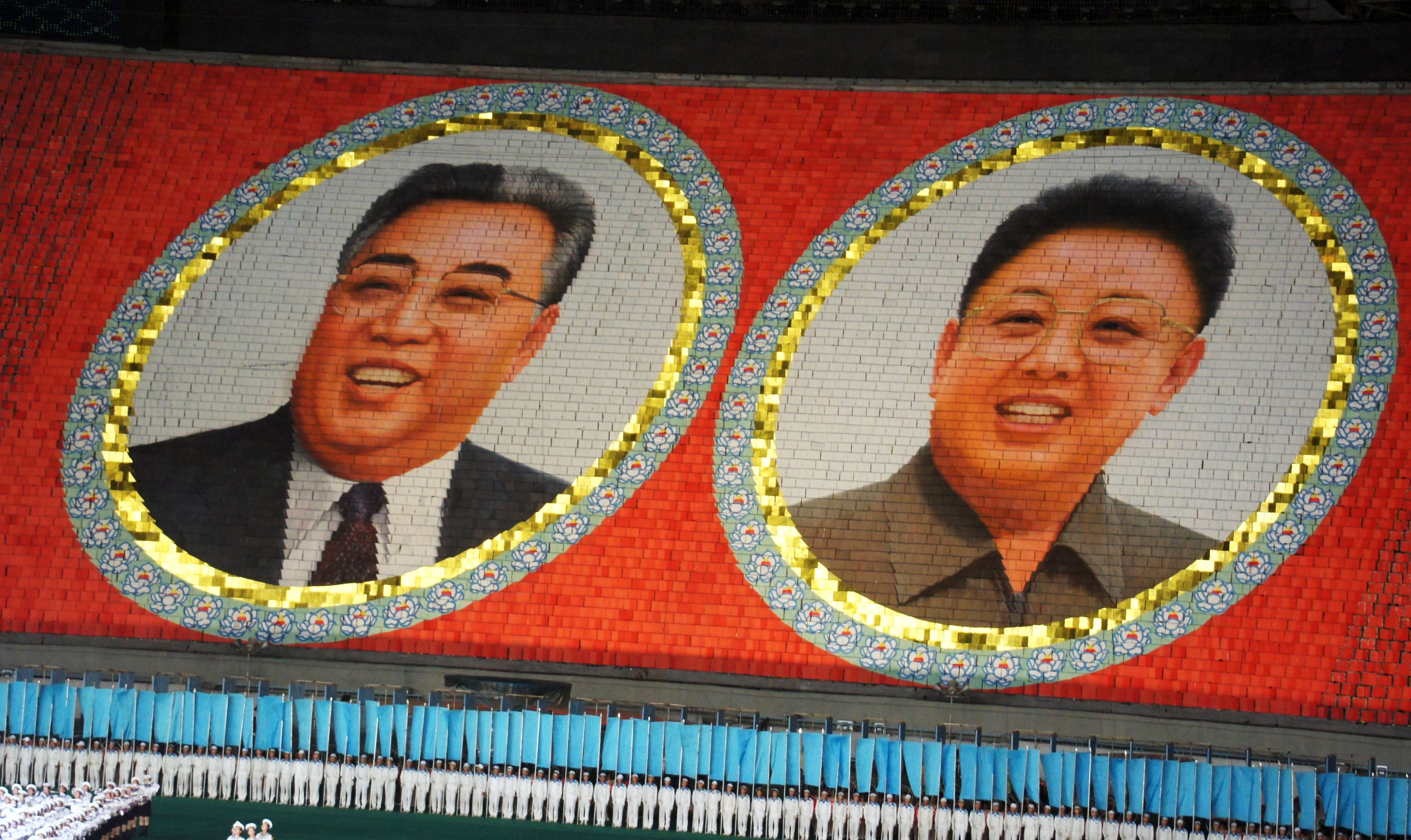
Portraits of Kim Jong Un's father and grandfather (Arirang Festival mass games in Pyongyang)

On 17 December 2011, Kim Jong Il died. Despite the elder Kim's plans, it was not immediately clear after his death whether Kim Jong Un would in fact take full power, and what his exact role in a new government would be. Following his father's death, Kim Jong Un was hailed as the "great successor to the revolutionary cause of Juche", "outstanding leader of the party, army and people", and "respected comrade who is identical to Supreme Commander Kim Jong Il", and was made chairman of the Kim Jong Il funeral committee. The Korean Central News Agency (KCNA) described Kim Jong Un as "a great person born of heaven", a propaganda term only his father and grandfather had enjoyed. The ruling Workers' Party of Korea also said in an editorial, "We vow with bleeding tears to call Kim Jong Un our supreme commander, our leader."

He was publicly declared Supreme Commander of the Korean People's Army on 24 December 2011, and formally appointed to the position on 30 December 2011 when the Politburo Workers' Party of Korea "courteously proclaimed that the dear respected Kim Jong Un, vice chairman of the Central Military Commission of the WPK, assumed the supreme commandership of the Korean People's Army". The message also declared that it was Kim Jong Il's will on 8 October 2011 that Kim Jong Un be appointed KPA supreme commander after his death. On 26 December 2011, the leading North Korean newspaper Rodong Sinmun reported that Kim Jong Un had been acting as chairman of the Central Military Commission, and supreme leader of the country, following his father's demise.

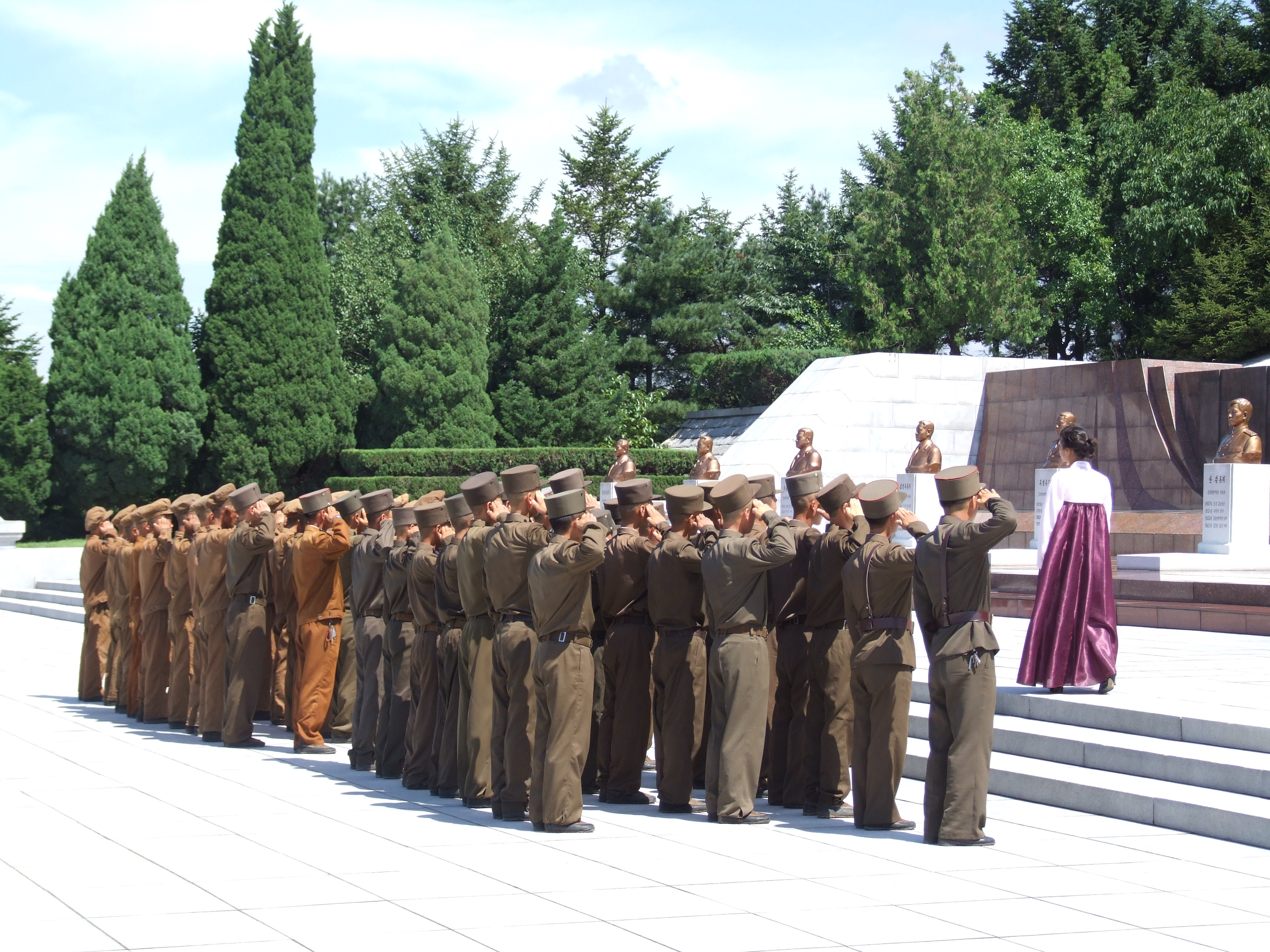
North Korean soldiers saluting at the Revolutionary Martyrs' Cemetery in Pyongyang, 2012

On 27 March 2012, Kim was elected to the 4th Conference of the Workers' Party of Korea. On 11 April, that conference wrote the post of general secretary out of the party charter and instead designated Kim Jong Il as the party's "Eternal General Secretary". The conference then elected Kim Jong Un as leader of the party under the newly created title of First Secretary. Kim Jong Un also took his father's post as Chairman of the Central Military Commission, as well as his father's old seat on the Politburo Presidium. In a speech made prior to the Conference, Kim Jong Un declared that "Imbuing the whole society with Kimilsungism–Kimjongilism is the highest programme of our Party". On 11 April 2012, the 5th Session of the 12th Supreme People's Assembly appointed Kim Jong Un as "First Chairman of the National Defence Commission", as the office of "Chairman of the National Defence Commission" was also abolished.

In July 2012, Kim Jong Un was promoted to konghwaguk wonsu (공화국원수; lit. 'marshal of the republic'), the highest active rank in the military. The decision was jointly issued by the Central Committee and the Central Military Commission of the Workers' Party of Korea, the National Defence Commission, and the Presidium of the Supreme People's Assembly, the KCNA subsequently announced. The only higher rank is Taewonsu (roughly translated as grand marshal or Generalissimo) which was held by Kim's grandfather, Kim Il Sung, and which was awarded posthumously to his father, Kim Jong Il, in February 2012. The promotion confirmed Kim's role as top leader of the North Korean military and came days after the replacement of Chief of General Staff Ri Yong Ho by Hyon Yong Chol.

External image
- Satellite imagery show the message "Long Live General Kim Jong Un, the Shining Sun!" in Korean on a hillside.

On 9 March 2014, Kim Jong Un was elected to a seat in the Supreme People's Assembly, the country's unicameral legislature. He ran unopposed, but voters had the choice of voting yes or no. There was a record turnout of voters and, according to government officials, all voted "yes" in his symbolic home district of Mount Paektu. The Supreme People's Assembly subsequently re-elected him the First Chairman of the National Defence Commission.

=== Leadership style ===
Analysts are divided about how much actual power Kim has. After he assumed power, some analysts had predicted that when Kim Jong Il died, Jang Song Thaek would act as regent, as Kim Jong Un was too inexperienced to immediately lead the country.

In July 2012, Kim Jong Un showed a change in cultural policy from his father by attending a Moranbong Band concert. The concert contained several elements of pop culture from the West, particularly the United States. Kim used this event to introduce his wife to the public, an unprecedented move in North Korea. In the same year, Kim Jong Il's personal chef Kenji Fujimoto visited North Korea and said, "Stores in Pyongyang were brimming with products and people in the streets looked cheerful. North Korea has changed a lot since Kim Jong Un assumed power. All of this is because of leader Kim Jong Un."

According to analysts, Kim Jong Un has used his resemblance to his grandfather to harness Kim Il Sung's personality cult and popular nostalgia for earlier times. In 2013, Kim copied his grandfather's style when he gave his first New Year's address, a break from the approach of his father, Kim Jong Il, who never made a televised address during his 17 years in power. He has also appeared more accessible and open than his father, hugging and linking arms with young and old. In his public appearances, he appears more active than his father or grandfather, for example, weeding, riding a horse, driving a tank, riding a rollercoaster, or using information technology.

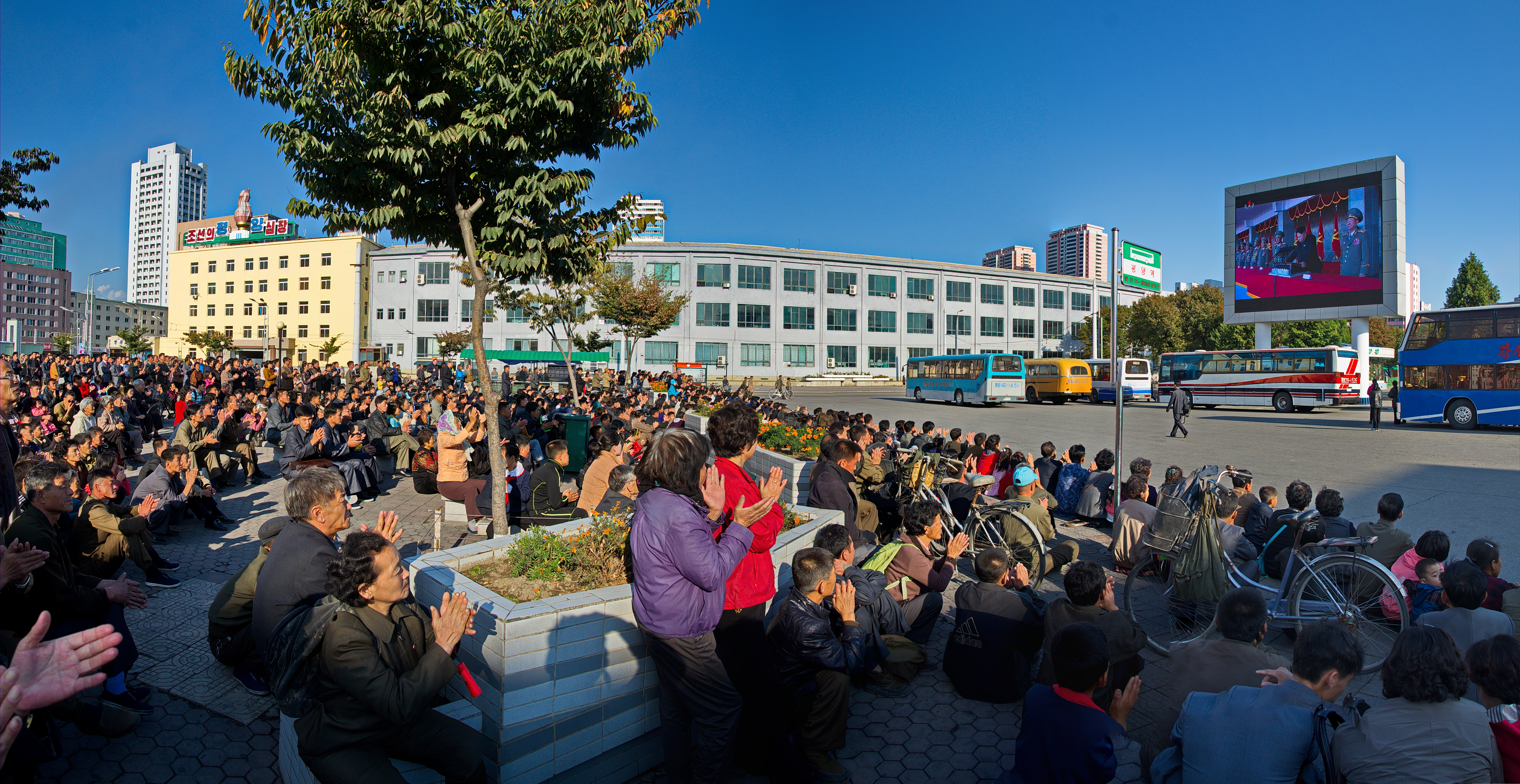
People in Pyongyang watch Kim Jong Un on North Korean TV, 2015

In April 2012, when a satellite launch failed, the government admitted this publicly, the first time it had ever done so. In May 2014, following the collapse of an apartment building in Pyongyang, Kim Jong Un was said to be very upset at the loss of life that resulted. A statement issued by the country's official news agency the Korean Central News Agency used the rare expression "profound consolation and apology". An unnamed government official was quoted by the BBC as saying Kim Jong Un had "sat up all night, feeling painful". While the height of the building and the number of casualties was not released, media reports described it as a 23-story building and indicated that more than a hundred people may have died in the collapse.

=== Public image ===
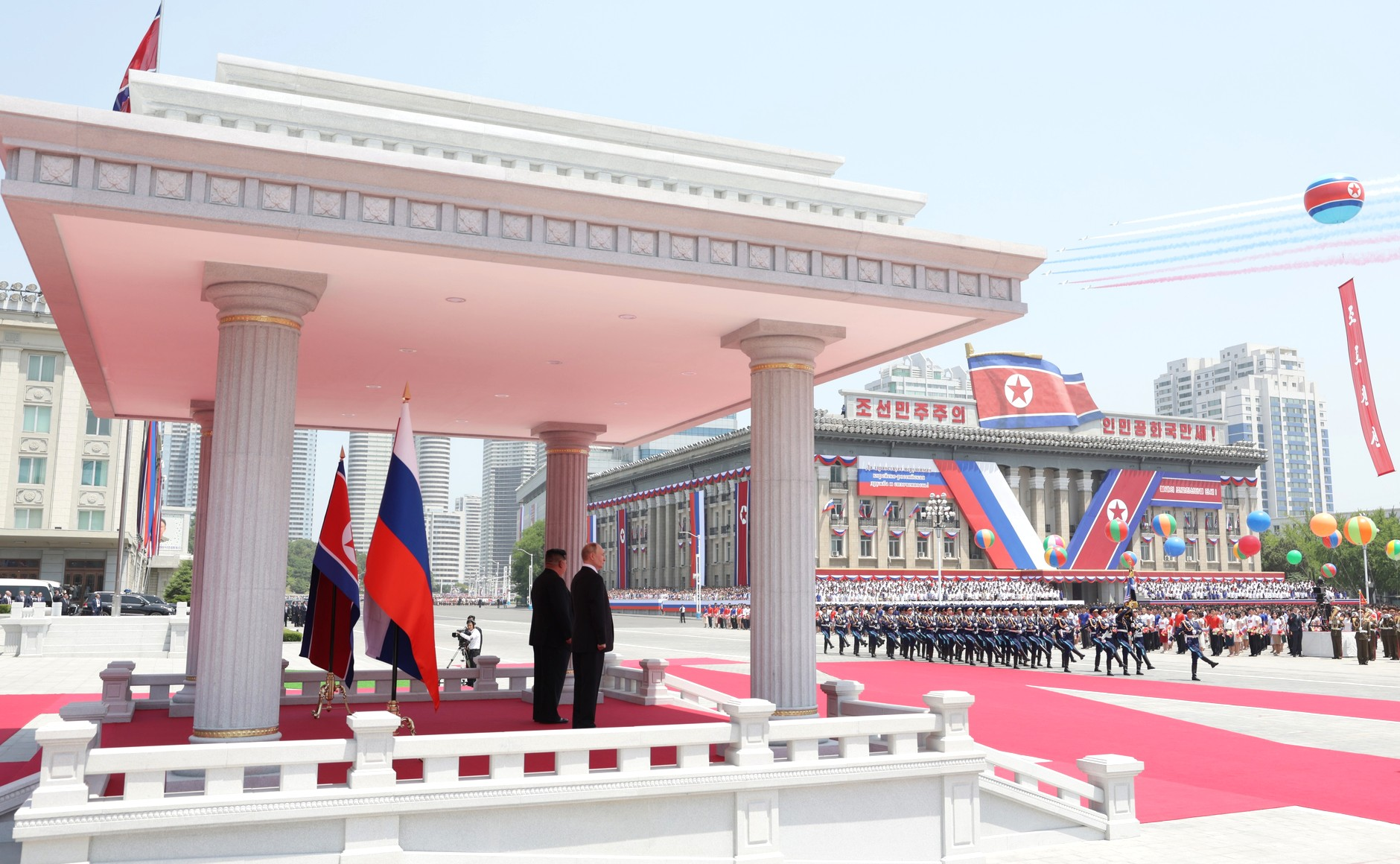
Kim and Vladimir Putin watching a military parade in Pyongyang.

Forbes magazine ranked Kim as the 36th most powerful person in the world in 2018, the highest amongst Koreans.

In a 2013 poll, 61.7% of North Korean defectors in South Korea said that Kim Jong Un was probably supported by most of his countrymen, an increase from the 55.7% approval rating for his father in a similar survey done two years earlier. In a poll of South Koreans conducted following the May 2018 inter-Korean summit, 78% of respondents said they trusted Kim, compared with 10% approval a couple months prior.

The nickname "Kim Fatty the Third" (Chinese: 金三胖; pinyin: Jīn Sān Pàng) began trending among Chinese users of the websites Baidu and Weibo in late 2016. In response, the North Korean government successfully petitioned the Chinese government to censor the nickname on all Chinese websites.

=== Cult of personality ===
Kim Jong Un frequently performs symbolic acts that associate him with the personality cult of his father and grandfather. Like them, Kim Jong Un regularly tours the country, giving "on-the-spot guidance" at various sites. North Korean state media often refers to him as "Respected Comrade Kim Jong Un" or "Marshal Kim Jong Un".

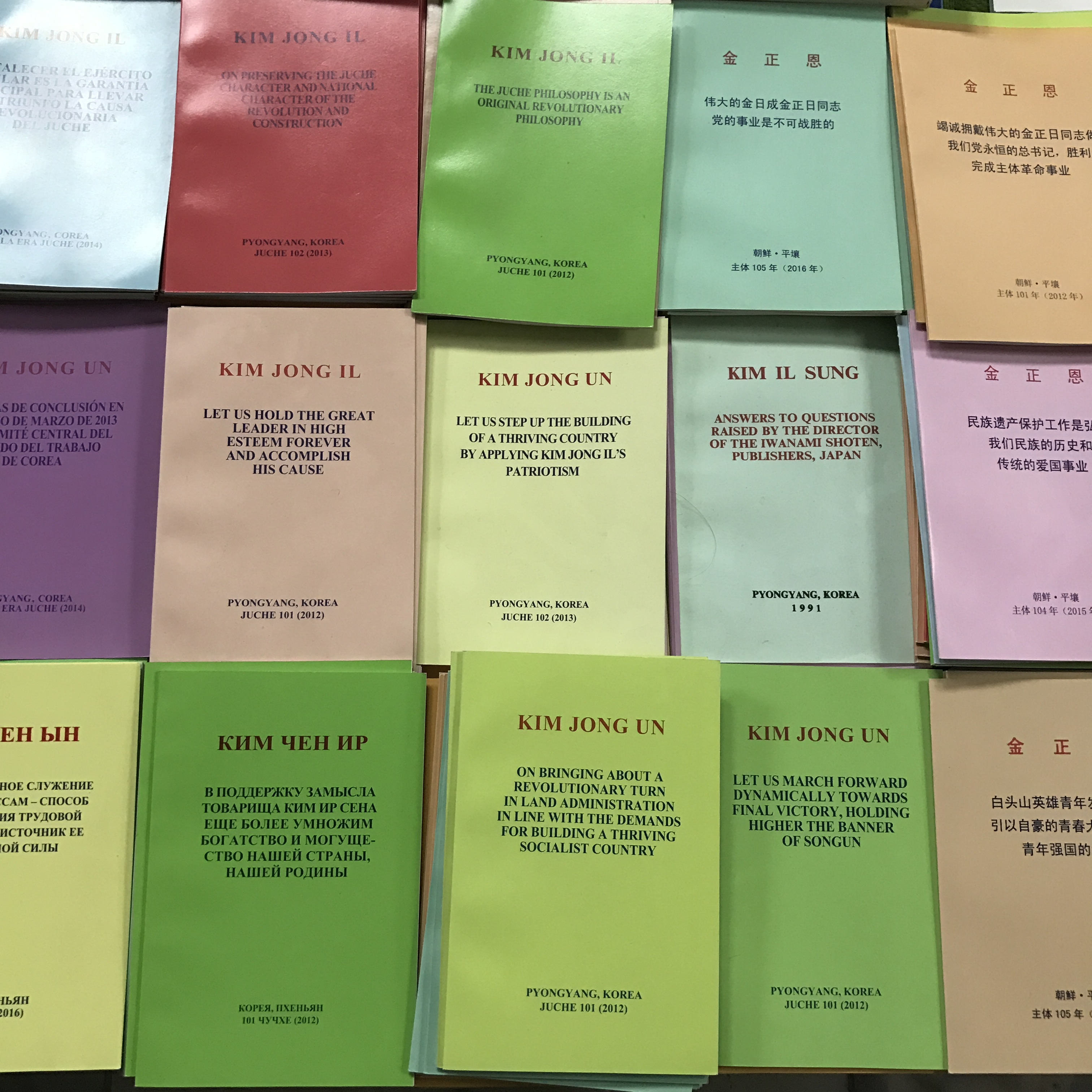
A selection of Kim Jong Un's works, translated to different languages

On 9 January 2012, a large rally was held by the Korean People's Army in front of the Kumsusan Palace of the Sun to honor Kim Jong Un and to demonstrate loyalty. On 15 April 2012, during a military parade to commemorate Kim Il Sung's centenary, Kim Jong Un made his first public speech, Let Us March Forward Dynamically Towards Final Victory, Holding Higher the Banner of Songun. That speech became the basis of a hymn dedicated to him, "Onwards Toward the Final Victory". In November 2012, satellite photos revealed a half-kilometer-long (1,600 ft) propaganda message carved into a hillside in Ryanggang Province, reading "Long Live General Kim Jong Un, the Shining Sun!"

=== Political developments ===
Kim has changed North Korea's internal power dynamics, increasing the influence of the WPK while decreasing the power of the military. In May 2016, he organized the WPK's 7th Congress, its first congress since 1980. In the congress, Kim was reelected as leader of the WPK, though his title of First Secretary was changed to Chairman (a title held by his grandfather from 1949 to 1966).

The Supreme People's Assembly (SPA) subsequently amended the constitution in June 2016, abolishing the National Defence Commission (NDC) except in times of war, and replacing it with the State Affairs Commission (SAC), which was named the "supreme policy-oriented leadership body of state power". Kim became the Chairman of the State Affairs Commission on 29 June 2016. These amendments marked the decrease of the military's influence, with the newly established SAC including more civilian and less military members than the NDC.

During the 2019 North Korean parliamentary election, Kim Jong Un became the first North Korean leader to not stand as a candidate for the SPA. The constitution was further amended in 2019 by the SPA. References to Juche and Songun were replaced by Kimilsungism–Kimjongilism, and the constitution stipulated that the mission of North Korea's armed forces was to "defend unto death the Party Central Committee headed by the great Comrade Kim Jong Un"; this made Kim the first North Korean leader to be named in the constitution while currently holding power. The chairman of the State Affairs Commission's status was amended to be the "supreme leader who represents the state", effectively making Kim Jong Un both de jure and de facto head of state; previously the president of the Presidium of the SPA was the de jure head of state. The chairman also was named as the commander-in-chief of the armed forces as well as the "supreme representative of all the Korean people".

In January 2021, the WPK held its 8th Congress, where Kim delivered a nine-hour-long report in which he admitted failures in carrying out the economic plan and lambasted leading officials' shortcomings. He also praised the country's nuclear capability and addressed the United States as the DPRK's main enemy. Kim Jong Un was reelected as party leader, with his title changed to General Secretary, a post held by his father and grandfather. Previously, the title general secretary was awarded "eternally" to Kim Jong Il in 2012. The congress also saw the WPK reassert its commitment to communism. The Control Commission was abolished, with the Central Auditing Commission taking up its duties. The Congress was also unique in that its backdrop did not include the Kim Il Sung and Kim Jong Il portraits where they would normally have been put, suggesting Kim's desire to make his mark on the country's politics.

The congress marked the consolidation of WPK control over the army, as well as a further decrease in the army's power; the number of military delegates dropped from 719 in the 7th Congress to 408. Politburo members increased from 28 to 30, though incumbent military elite membership decreased from eight to six. The influence of the KPA Party Committee and the General Political Bureau (GPB) was decreased; with the committee's ranking now equal to provincial party committees, while it was above them previously. The GPB was also no longer equal to the Central Committee, while the Central Military Commission was given effective command of the armed forces. "Military-first policy" was also removed from the charter, being replaced by "people-first politics".

Under Kim, North Korea has changed the names of several offices and institutions in what has been named by Yonhap News Agency as an effort to present itself as a "normal state". The Ministry of People's Armed Forces was renamed to the Ministry of Defence in January 2021, while state media began referring to Kim as "President of the State Affairs" rather than "chairman" in English language articles starting from February 2021. In November 2021, the South Korean NIS reported that the North Korean government has begun using the term Kimjongunism, in an effort to establish an independent ideological system centered on Kim. Analyst Ken Gause described this as Kim "now ready to put his stamp firmly on the regime".

=== Economic policies ===
Kim Jong Un has been promoting a policy of byungjin (병진), similar to his grandfather Kim Il Sung's policies from the 1960s, developing the national economy in parallel with the country's nuclear weapons program. A set of comprehensive economic measures, the "Socialist Corporate Responsible Management System", were introduced in 2013. The measures increase the autonomy of enterprises by granting them "certain rights to engage in business activities autonomously and elevate the will to labor through appropriately implementing the socialist distribution system". Another priority of economic policies that year was agriculture, where the pojon (vegetable garden) responsibility system was implemented. The system reportedly achieved a major increase in output in some collective farms.

North Korean media described the economy as a "flexible collectivist system" where enterprises were applying "active and evolutionary actions" to achieve economic development. These reports reflect Kim's general economic policy of reforming management, increasing the autonomy and incentives for economic actors. This set of reforms known as the "May 30th measures" reaffirms both socialist ownership and "objective economic laws in guidance and management" to improve living standards. Other objectives of the measures are to increase the availability of domestically manufactured goods on markets, introduction of defence innovations into the civilian sector and boost international trade.

There has been a construction boom in Pyongyang, bringing colour and creative architectural styles to the city. While in the past there was a concentration on building monuments, Kim Jong Un's government has constructed amusement parks, aquatic parks, skating rinks, a dolphinarium and a ski resort. Kim has been actively promoting a consumer culture, including entertainment and cosmetics. He has also overseen the construction of tourist attractions in the country.

Kim has attempted to ease North Korea's food shortages, though the food situation deteriorated during the COVID-19 pandemic. In March 2023, during a WPK plenary session, he called for boosting agricultural production, saying that it is "important to concentrate on increasing the yield at all the farms".

=== Purges and executions ===
As with all reporting on North Korea, reports of purges and executions are difficult to verify. Allegations in 2013 that Kim Jong Un had his ex-girlfriend, singer Hyon Song Wol, executed for violating pornography laws turned out to be false. In May 2016, analysts were surprised to find that General Ri Yong Gil, reported by South Korea to have been executed earlier in the year, was, in fact, alive and well.

In December 2013, Kim Jong Un's uncle Jang Song Thaek was arrested and executed for treachery. Jang is believed to have been executed by firing squad. Yonhap has stated that, according to multiple unnamed sources, Kim Jong Un has also put to death members of Jang's family, to completely destroy all traces of Jang's existence through "extensive executions" of his family, including the children and grandchildren of all close relatives. Those reportedly killed in Kim's purge include Jang's sister Jang Kye Sun, her husband and ambassador to Cuba, Jon Yong Jin, and Jang's nephew and ambassador to Malaysia, Jang Yong Chol. The nephew's two sons were also said to have been killed. At the time of Jang's removal, it was announced that "the discovery and purge of the Jang group ... made our party and revolutionary ranks purer ..." and after his execution on 12 December 2013 state media warned that the army "will never pardon all those who disobey the order of the Supreme Commander".

=== Human rights violations ===
Like his father and grandfather, Kim rules North Korea as a totalitarian state. In January 2013, the UN High Commissioner for Human Rights Navi Pillay said that the North Korean human rights situation had not improved since Kim had taken power and called for an investigation. A report on the situation of human rights in North Korea in February 2013 by United Nations Special Rapporteur Marzuki Darusman proposed a UN commission of inquiry. The report of the commission of inquiry was published in February 2014 and suggested Kim could "possibly" be made accountable for crimes against humanity at the International Criminal Court.

In July 2016, the United States Department of the Treasury imposed personal sanctions on Kim. Although his involvement in human rights abuses was cited as the reason, officials said the sanctions target the country's nuclear and missile programs. In June 2017, U.S. President Donald Trump condemned Kim Jong Un's "brutal" government and described Kim as a "madman" after the death of American student Otto Warmbier who had been imprisoned during a visit to North Korea. However, in 2019, President Trump said that he believed Kim was not responsible for Warmbier's death.

=== Alleged assassination attempts ===
In 2012, a gun was discovered beneath a juniper tree in Ryugyeongwon, located near a route that Kim was going to travel. It was assumed this was part of an assassination attempt.

In May 2017, the North Korean government stated that the Central Intelligence Agency (CIA) of the United States and the South Korean NIS hired a North Korean lumberjack who worked in Russia to assassinate Kim with a "biochemical weapon" that was both radioactive and nano-poisonous, and whose effect would have been delayed by a few months. North Korea said that it would seek extradition of anyone involved in the assassination attempt.

=== Nuclear weapons development ===
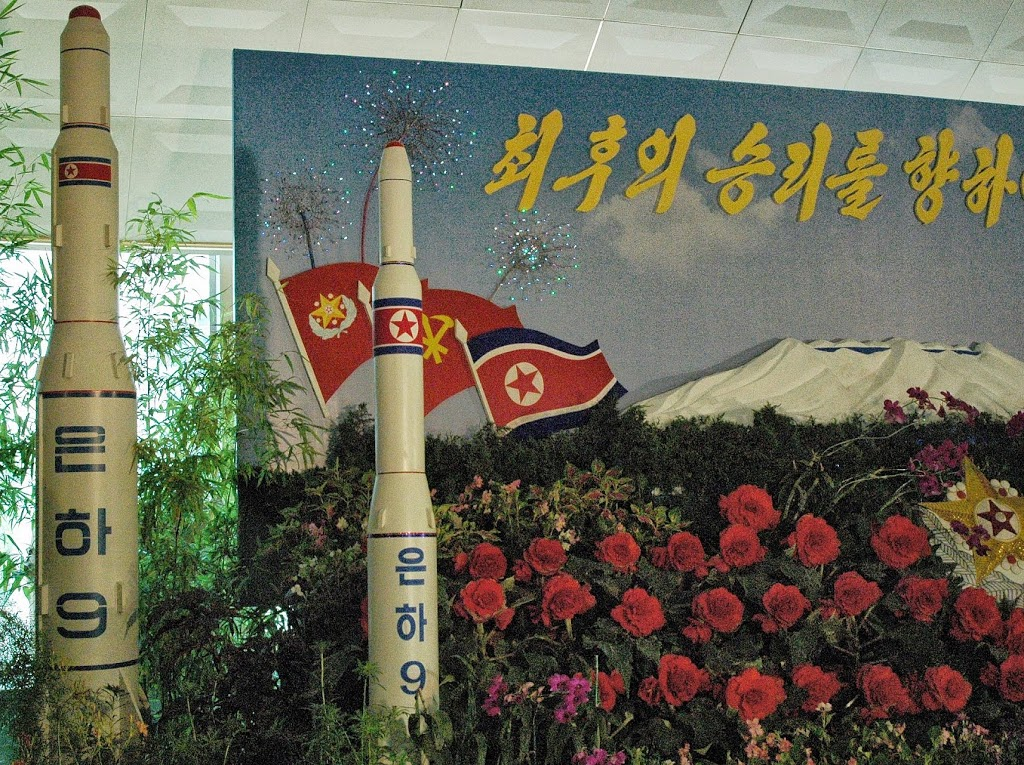
Model of an Unha-9 rocket on display at a floral exhibition in Pyongyang, 30 August 2013

Under Kim Jong Un, North Korea has continued to develop nuclear weapons, testing bombs in February 2013, January and September 2016, and September 2017. As of 2021, North Korea had conducted nearly 120 missile tests under Kim Jong Un, compared with roughly 33 tests during the combined tenures of his father and grandfather. By 2023, this climbed up to a total of 226. According to several analysts, North Korea sees the nuclear arsenal as vital to deter an attack, and it is unlikely that North Korea would launch a nuclear war. According to a RAND Corporation senior researcher, Kim Jong Un believes that nuclear weapons are his guarantee of the survival of North Korea and its government. In 2022, it was estimated that North Korea had around 45–55 nuclear weapons.

In 2012, on the 100th anniversary of Kim Il Sung's birth, he said: "the days are gone forever when our enemies could blackmail us with nuclear bombs". At a plenary meeting of the Central Committee of the Workers' Party held on 31 March 2013, he announced that North Korea would adopt "a new strategic line on carrying out economic construction and building nuclear armed forces simultaneously". In December 2015, Kim stated that his family "turned the DPRK into a powerful nuclear weapons state ready to detonate a self-reliant A-bomb and H-bomb to reliably defend its sovereignty and the dignity of the nation".

During the 7th WPK Congress in 2016, Kim Jong Un stated that North Korea would "not use nuclear weapons first unless aggressive hostile forces use nuclear weapons to invade on our sovereignty". However, on other occasions, North Korea has threatened "pre-emptive" nuclear attacks against a US-led attack. In his New Year's Day speech on 2 January 2017, Kim Jong Un said that the country was in the "last stage" of preparations to test-fire an intercontinental ballistic missile (ICBM). On 4 July, North Korea conducted the first publicly announced flight test of its ICBM Hwasong-14, timed to coincide with the U.S. Independence Day celebrations. On 3 September, the country conducted its sixth nuclear test. On 28 November 2017, North Korea tested the Hwasong-15 missile, which became the first ballistic missile developed by North Korea that is theoretically capable of reaching all of the US mainland. In response, the United Nations Security Council enacted a series of sanctions against North Korea for its nuclear program and missile tests.

Until 2022, North Korea's stated policy position was that nuclear weapons "will never be abused or used as a means for preemptive strike", but if there is an "attempt to have recourse to military force against us" North Korea may use their "most powerful offensive strength in advance to punish them". This was not a full no first use policy. This policy changed in 2022 with a law approved by the SPA, which states that in the case of an attack against the top leadership or the nuclear command and control system, nuclear attacks against the enemy would be launched automatically. Additionally, the new law indicates that if Kim Jong Un was killed, the authorization of nuclear strikes would pass to a senior official.

=== Foreign relations ===
==== China ====
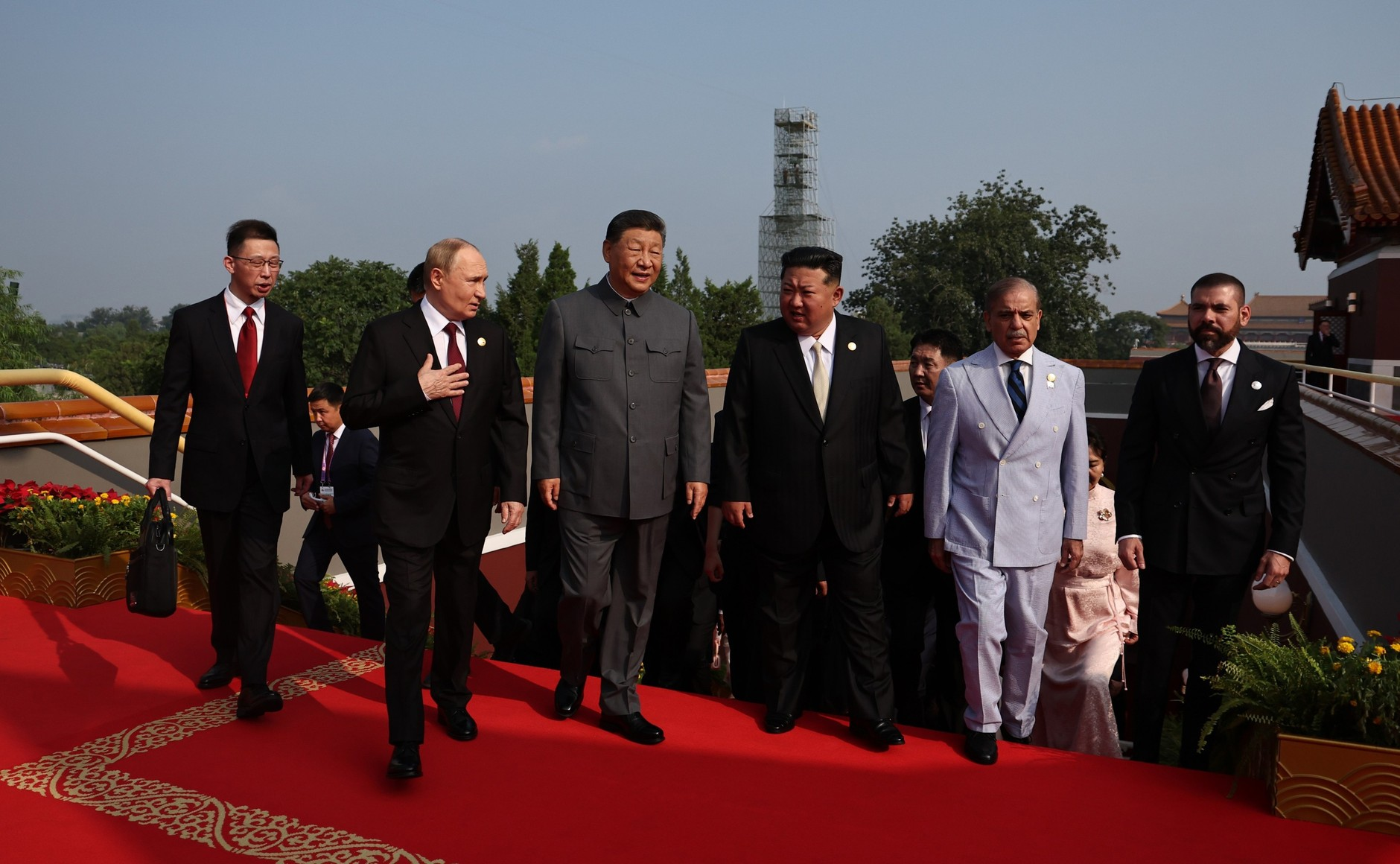
Kim Jong Un with CCP General Secretary Xi Jinping and Russian President Vladimir Putin prior to the start of the 2025 China Victory Day Parade

Relations with China initially deteriorated under Kim due to his nuclear weapons program. On 30 November 2012, Kim met with Li Jianguo, member of the Politburo of the ruling Chinese Communist Party (CCP) and first-ranking vice chairman of the National People's Congress Standing Committee, who "briefed Kim on the 18th CCP National Congress", according to the KCNA. A letter from General Secretary of the Chinese Communist Party Xi Jinping was hand-delivered during the discussion.

China condemned North Korea's nuclear tests in 2013, 2016, and 2017. China also banned imports of North Korean coal in February 2017, while enforcing UN Security Council sanctions on North Korea put in 2017. In response, the Korean Central News Agency published an unprecedented criticism of China, accusing it of "big-power chauvinism"; KCNA later published articles criticizing Chinese state media.

The relationship started improving in March 2018, when Kim visited Beijing, meeting with CCP General Secretary Xi Jinping, marking his first foreign trip since assuming power. From 7–8 May, Kim made a second visit to China, meeting with Xi in Dalian. A further third meeting happened on 19–20 June, when Kim travelled to Beijing to meet Xi. Kim again met Xi in Beijing on 7–10 January 2019. On 20–21 June 2019, Xi travelled to Pyongyang, the first visit by a Chinese leader to North Korea since CCP General Secretary Hu Jintao visited in 2005.

On 2 September 2025, North Korean leader Kim Jong Un, accompanied by many other North Korean dignitaries, traveled to Beijing by special train to attend the 80th anniversary of the China Victory Day Parade, marking his first visit to China since 2019, as well as the first time he attended a multilateral event. In June 2026, Xi visited North Korea, marking his first visit since 2019. In October 2026, he visited Dandong, where he met with Chinese People's Political Consultative Conference National Committee Chairman Wang Huning at the Memorial of the War to Resist US Aggression and Aid Korea to commemorate the 76th anniversary of China's entry to the Korean War. They also visited a car factory in Dandong, and Kim returned to North Korea afterwards through the New Yalu River Bridge.

==== South Korea and the United States ====
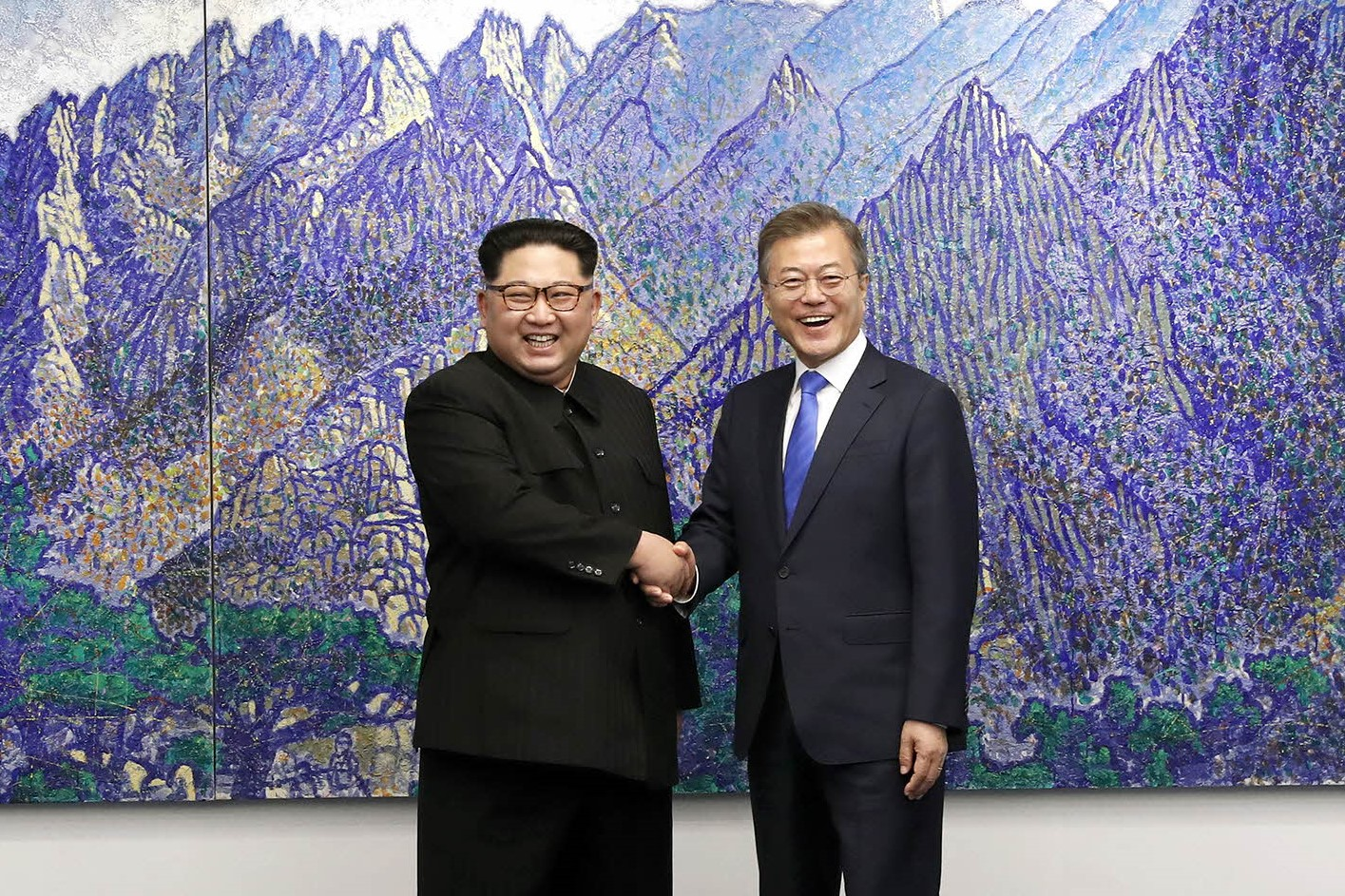
Kim and South Korean President Moon Jae-in shake hands during the 2018 inter-Korean Summit in April 2018

In his 2018 New Year Speech, Kim announced that he was open to dialogue with South Korea with a view to take part in the upcoming Winter Olympics in the South. The Seoul–Pyongyang hotline was reopened after almost two years. North and South Korea marched together in the Olympics opening ceremony, and fielded a united women's ice hockey team. In addition to the athletes, Kim sent an unprecedented high-level delegation including his sister, Kim Yo Jong, and President of the Presidium, Kim Yong Nam, and performers such as the Samjiyon Orchestra. On 5 March, he had a meeting with South Korea's Chief of the National Security Office, Chung Eui Yong, in Pyongyang.

At the April 2018 inter-Korean summit, Kim and South Korean President Moon Jae-in signed the Panmunjom Declaration, pledging to convert the Korean Armistice Agreement into a full peace treaty, formally ending the Korean War, by the end of the year. On 26 May, Kim had a second and unannounced meeting in the North Korean side of Panmunjom, meeting with Moon to discuss his proposed summit with US President Donald Trump in Singapore.

Kim and U.S. President Donald Trump shake hands at the start of the 2019 Koreas–United States DMZ Summit in July 2019

On 10 June, Kim arrived in Singapore and met with Prime Minister Lee Hsien Loong. On 12 June, Kim held his first summit with Trump and signed a declaration, affirming a commitment to peace, nuclear disarmament, and the repatriation of the remains of U.S. war dead. This marked the first-ever meeting between leaders of North Korea and the United States.

In September, Kim held another summit with Moon Jae-in in Pyongyang. Kim agreed to dismantle North Korea's nuclear weapons facilities if the United States took reciprocal action. The two governments also announced that they would establish buffer zones on their borders to prevent clashes.

In February 2019, Kim held another summit with Trump in Hanoi, Vietnam, which Trump cut short on the second day without an agreement. The Trump administration said that the North Koreans wanted complete sanctions relief, while the North Koreans said that they were only asking for partial sanctions relief. On 30 June 2019, in the Korean DMZ, Kim again met with Trump, shaking hands warmly and expressing hope for peace. Kim and Trump then joined Moon Jae-in for a brief chat. Talks in Stockholm began on 5 October 2019 between US and North Korean negotiating teams but broke down after one day. During this period, Trump and Kim established a personal relationship and exchanged at least 27 letters in which the two men described a warm personal friendship.

By 2020, however, negotiations almost completely stalled without progress on denuclearization, with both Trump and Kim focusing on domestic issues. North Korean foreign ministry further criticized the Trump administration that year for "empty promise[s]", and further took action by demolishing the four-story joint-liaison office building it shared with South Korea on 17 June. North Korea further ignored attempts at outreach by the administration of president Joe Biden, and Kim said in October 2021 that the "US has been frequently sending signals that they are not hostile towards our country, but there is no single evidence that they are not hostile", and also criticized South Korea for "destroying the military balance in the Korean peninsula and increasing military instability and danger".

In December 2023, during a speech at the 9th plenum of the 8th Central Committee of the Workers' Party of Korea, Kim called for a "fundamental turnabout" in North Korea's stance towards South Korea, calling the South the "enemy". He stated "the party's comprehensive conclusion after reviewing decades-long inter-Korean relations is that reunification can never be achieved with those ROK riffraffs that defined the 'unification by absorption' and 'unification under liberal democracy' as their state policy", which he said is in "sharp contradiction with what our line of national reunification was: one nation, one state with two systems".

Kim cited South Korean constitution's claims over the entire Korean Peninsula and South Korean President Yoon Suk Yeol's policy towards the north as evidence that South Korea is an unsuitable partner for reunification. He said the relations between the two Koreas currently were "states hostile to each other and the relations between two belligerent states" and no longer ones that are "consanguineous or homogeneous", continuing by saying it is "unsuitable" to discuss the issue of reunification "with this strange clan [ROK], who is no more than a colonial stooge of the U.S. despite the rhetorical word [we used to use]—'the fellow countrymen." Kim also instructed the WPK on reforming organizations related to inter-Korean relations, including the WPK's United Front Department.

==== Russia ====
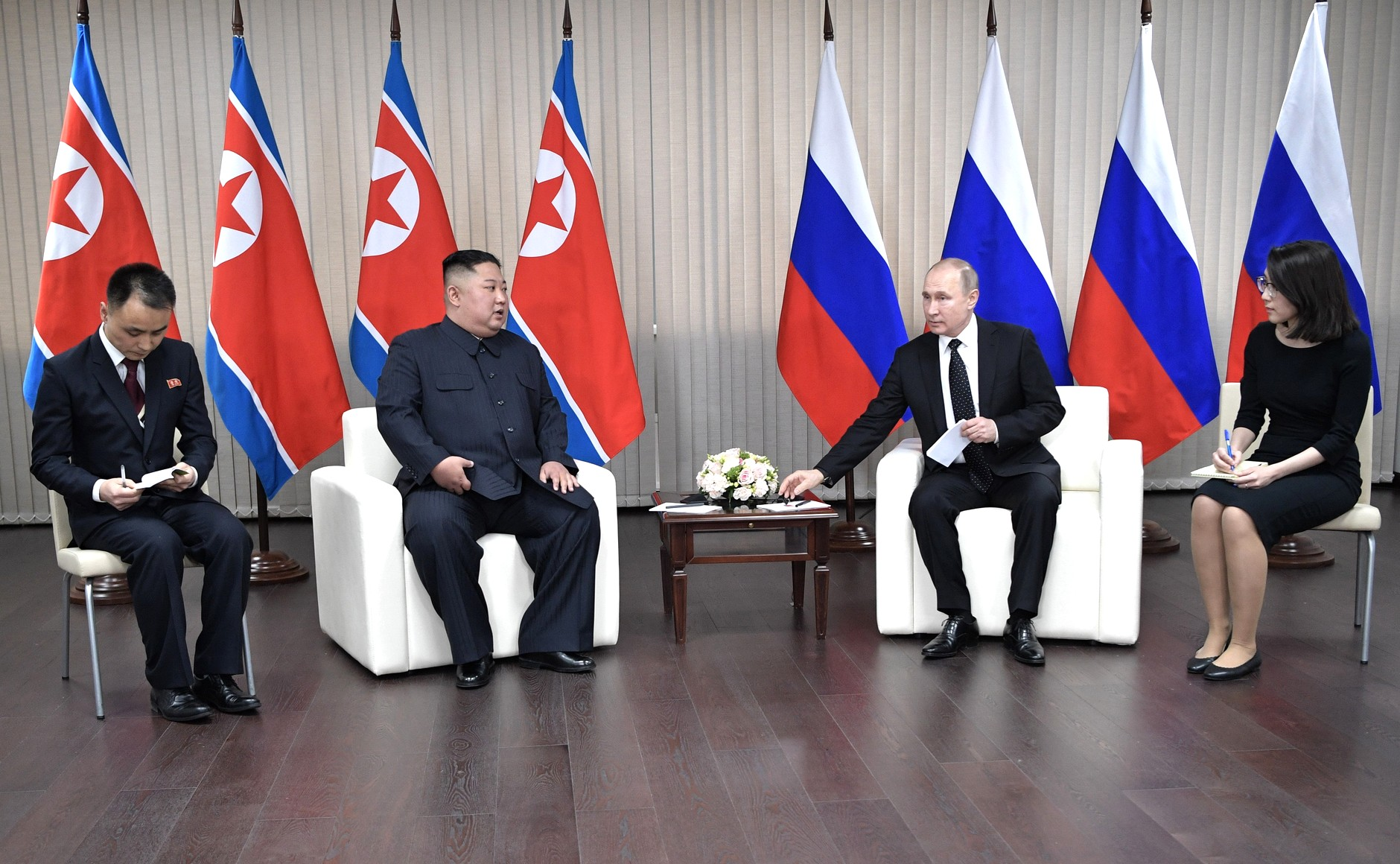
Kim meeting with Russian President Vladimir Putin during the North Korea–Russia Summit, April 2019

On 25 April 2019, Kim held his first meeting with Russian president Vladimir Putin in Vladivostok. Kim Jong Un requested Russian leader Vladimir Putin's help in resolving a nuclear stalemate with the U.S.

North Korea under Kim supported Russia's invasion of Ukraine in 2022, blaming the "hegemonic policy" of the US for the war, recognizing the independence of the breakaway states of Donetsk and Luhansk People's Republics in Eastern Ukraine as well as recognizing Russia's unilateral annexation of Donetsk, Kherson, Luhansk and Zaporizhzhia oblasts on 30 September. In September 2022, US intelligence said that Russia was buying millions of artillery shells and rockets from North Korea due to the sanctions caused by Russia's invasion of Ukraine. A February 2023 report by the Center for Strategic International Studies (CSIS) stated that after dropping to nearly zero during the COVID-19 era, trade between North Korea and Russia rebounded back to pre-pandemic levels.

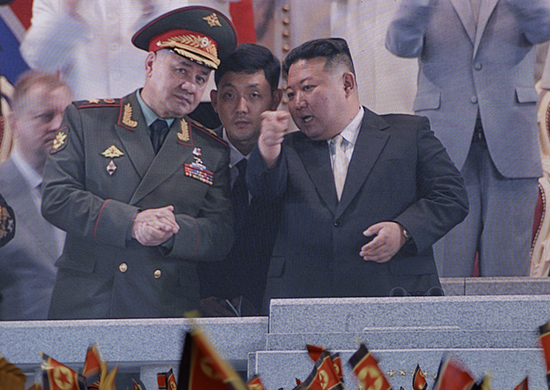
Kim with Russian Minister of Defence Sergei Shoigu at a parade in Pyongyang, on the occasion of the Day of Victory in the Great Fatherland Liberation War, 27 July 2023

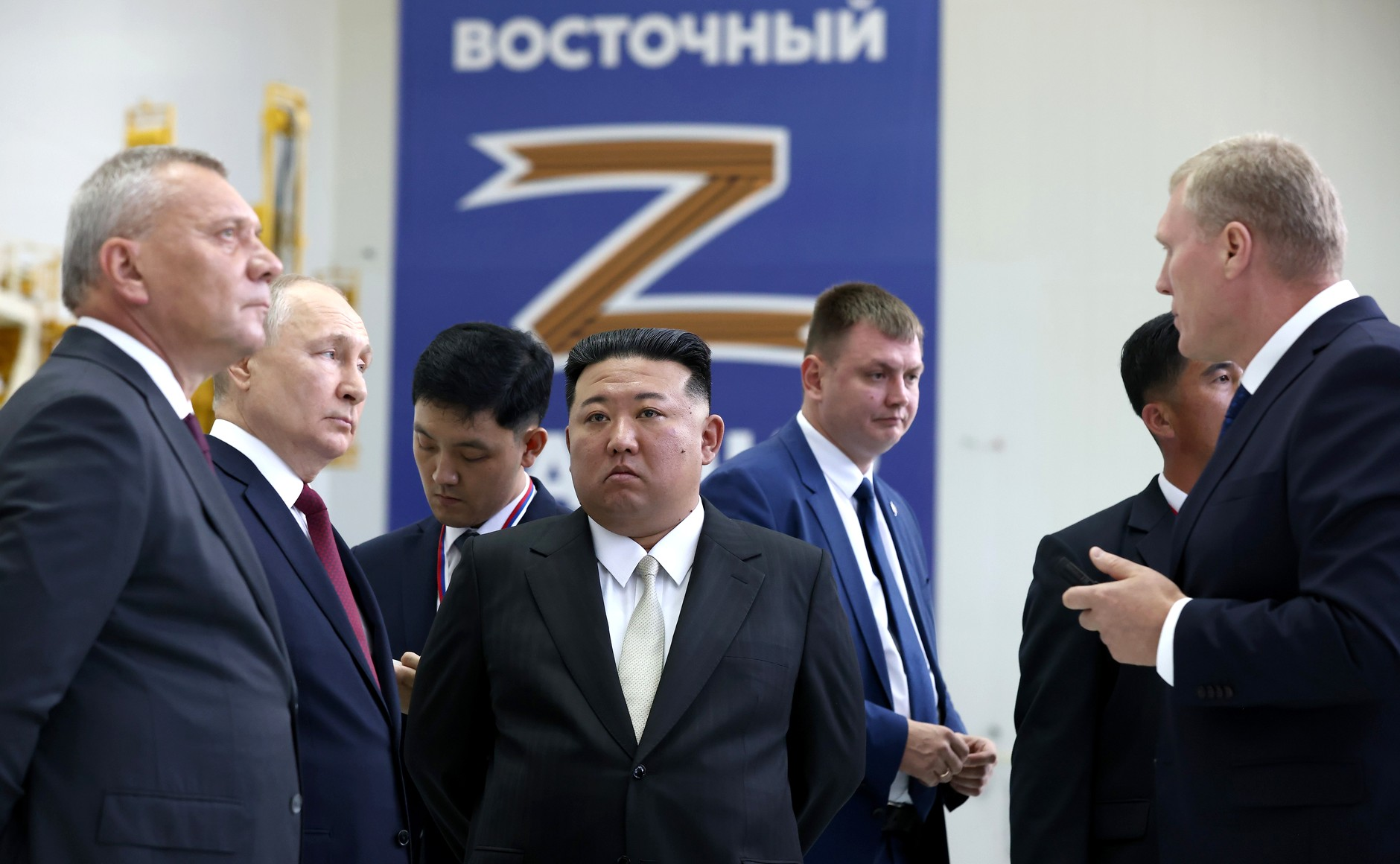
Kim with Vladimir Putin at Vostochny Cosmodrome, September 2023

In July 2023, Russian Minister of Defence Sergei Shoigu and a Chinese delegation led by CCP Politburo member Li Hongzhong arrived in North Korea for the 70th anniversary of the end of the Korean War. Shoigu met with Kim Jong Un and North Korean Defense Minister Kang Sun Nam. In September 2023, Kim Jong Un visited Russia in his first foreign trip since 2019. The meeting lasted over four hours at the Vostochny Cosmodrome in the Amur Oblast, and was described as underpinning how the two countries' interests are aligning. During the meeting, Kim once again gave his support for Russia's "sacred fight" against the West, expressing his "...support for all the measures taken by the Russian government, and [he] takes this opportunity again to affirm that [he] will always be with Russia." When asked if Russia would help North Korea build satellites, presumably in return for ammunition, Putin said "that's why [they] came here."

In November 2023, the NIS reported that North Korea had exported over one million shells to Russia since August 2023, compared to a combined 2 million shells provided by NATO members to Ukraine since the start of the Russian invasion of Ukraine. In February 2024, Kim received a car as a gift from Putin. Four months later Putin arrived in Pyongyang and held talks with Kim. It was Putin's second visit to North Korea, since 2000. Both sides signed the North Korean–Russian Treaty on Comprehensive Strategic Partnership as an agreement of close mutual defence corporation and militant friendship. By the end of 2024, Russia and North Korea had exchanged delegations on AI, cyber-operations, intelligence, science and technology, sports, agriculture, and culture.

In October 2024 North Korea sent military personnel to Russia who fought against Ukraine for Russia in Russian uniforms and under Russian command. According to the United States and its allies, by the end of 2024 North Korea had sent 11,000 troops to fight for Russia, along with munitions including at least six million heavy artillery rounds and 100 ballistic missiles. Although North Korea initially denied that it was involved in the Russo-Ukrainian war, in April 2025 Kim publicly acknowledged that North Korean troops were fighting alongside Russian forces to "annihilate and wipe out the Ukrainian neo-Nazi occupiers." According to US historian and former diplomat Jung H. Pak, in addition to payments for arms and soldiers Russia likely provided North Korea with various commodities and assisted it in accessing the global financial system to pay its workers, circumventing UN sanctions.

=== COVID-19 pandemic ===
During 2020, Kim claimed success in combating the COVID-19 pandemic in North Korea, after putting the country in isolation and limiting public gatherings. In April 2020, a three-week absence from public view led to speculation that Kim was seriously ill or dead, but no clear evidence of any health problem came to light. He appeared rarely in public over the following months, possibly because of health problems or the risk of COVID-19. In August, it was reported that Kim had ceded a degree of authority to his sister, Kim Yo Jong, giving her responsibility for relations with South Korea and the United States and making her his de facto second-in-command.

On 5 September 2020, Kim toured the areas hit by Typhoon Maysak. He also replaced the local provincial party committee chairman and ordered Pyongyang officials to lead a recovery effort. His ruling party also pledged harsh punishment for the city and provincial officials, stating that they failed to protect the residents from the disaster. Kim fired Kim Song Il, who was chairman of the South Hamgyong Province Workers' Party of Korea Committee. In January 2022, a North Korean KCTV documentary, "2021, A Great Victorious Year", was released, which appeared to address Kim's sudden weight loss and infrequent public appearances. It said that Kim's body had "completely withered away" as he "suffered" for the people during 2021, completing tasks hitherto unpublicized while North Korea faced "challenges" and "worst-ever hardships".

North Korea claimed to have detected no cases of COVID-19 until May 2022, although several South Korean academics doubt this claim, pointing to restrictions and economic data. In May 2022, North Korea announced that its first COVID-19 outbreak had started in April. In a meeting with the WPK, Kim ordered "all the cities and counties of the whole country to thoroughly lock down", and called for the mobilization of emergency reserve medical supplies. In the days that followed the country's announcement, hundreds of thousands of new cases of fevers were reported, as well as 27 related deaths related to fever of unidentified origins, among which one death was confirmed as from the Omicron variant according to state-media KCNA. Kim spoke further at a subsequent WPK meeting, stating that the virus had brought "great turmoil" to his country, and urged the party and people to remain unified and organized in their efforts to combat the virus. Kim went on to blame the crisis on incompetence and irresponsibility on the part of the party organizations, and also cast blame on "negligence including drug overdose due to lack of knowledge of treatment methods" as the reason for most of the deaths since the outbreak. As part of the country's response to the COVID-19 outbreak, Kim stated that he looked to learn from the response mounted by China. By the end of May, North Korean state media reported the COVID-19 outbreak was "controlled and improved across the country" following a re-evaluation by Kim and the WPK. In August 2022, Kim Yo Jong indicated that Jong Un had contracted the virus.

== Personal life ==
=== Personality ===
Kenji Fujimoto, a Japanese chef who was Kim Jong Il's personal cook, described Kim Jong Un as "a chip off the old block, a spitting image of his father in terms of face, body shape, and personality". Kim is a fan of basketball, and his favorite teams include the Chicago Bulls and the Los Angeles Lakers. On 26 February 2013, Kim Jong Un met basketball player Dennis Rodman, which led many reporters to speculate that Rodman was the first American whom Kim had met. During Rodman's trip, Vice magazine correspondent Ryan Duffy said that Kim was "socially awkward" and avoided eye contact.

According to Cheong Seong-chang of the Sejong Institute, Kim Jong Un has greater visible interest in the welfare of his people and engages in greater interaction with them than his father did. South Koreans who saw Kim at the summit in April 2018 described him as straightforward, humorous, and attentive. After meeting him, Donald Trump said, "I learned he was a talented man. I also learned he loves his country very much." He added that Kim had a "great personality" and was "very smart".

=== Wealth ===
The International Business Times reported Kim to have 17 luxury palaces around North Korea, a fleet of 100 (mostly European) luxury cars, a private jet, and a 100-foot (30 m) yacht. Dennis Rodman described his trip to a private island owned by Kim Jong Un: "It's like Hawaii, Ibiza, or Aruba but he's the only one that lives there."

In 2012, Business Insider reported that there were "[s]igns of a rise in luxury goods ... creeping out of North Korea since Kim Jong Un took over" and that his "wife Ri Sol Ju was photographed holding what appeared to be an expensive Dior handbag, worth almost $1,594 – an average year's salary in North Korea". According to diplomatic sources, "Kim Jong Un likes to drink and party all night like his father and ordered the [imported sauna] equipment to help him beat hangovers and fatigue."

In 2018, Kim reportedly received delivery of two armored Mercedes-Maybach S600s, each valued at $500,000, through an illicit shipping network in violation of international sanctions.

=== Health ===
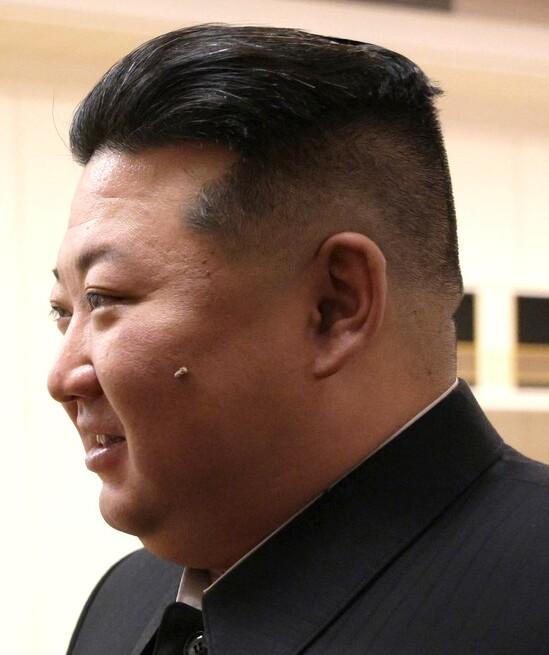
A growth on Kim's cheek, June 2024.

In 2009, reports suggested that Kim Jong Un was a diabetic and suffered from hypertension. Like his grandfather and father, he is also known to smoke cigarettes.

Kim Jong Un did not appear in public for six weeks in September and October 2014. State media reported that he was suffering from an "uncomfortable physical condition". Previously, he had been limping. When he reappeared, he was using a walking stick. In September 2015, the South Korean government commented that Kim appeared to have gained 30 kg (66 lb) in body mass over the previous five years, reaching an estimated weight of 130 kg (290 lb).

In April 2020, Kim was not seen in public for 20 days, leading to rumours that he was critically ill or dead. In June 2021, following a one-month-long absence from the public eye, outside observers noted that Kim had lost a considerable amount of weight. It was speculated that he had lost 10 to 20 kg (22 to 44 lb). In July 2024, South Korea's spy agency, the National Intelligence Service, reported that Kim had regained weight and was suffering from obesity-related health issues, including high blood pressure and diabetes. North Korean officials were reportedly seeking new medications abroad for his conditions. As of 2024, a growth on his cheek was noted to be increasing in size.

=== Family ===
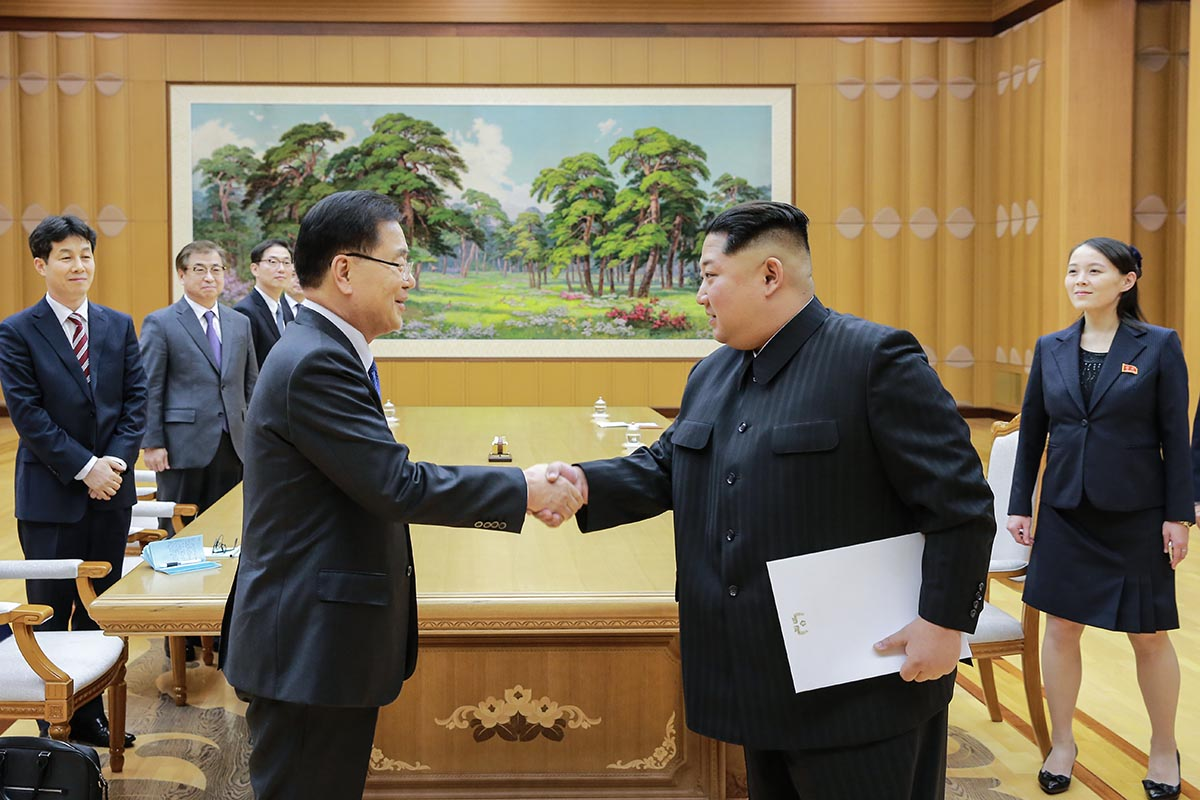
Kim (holding envelope) with Chung Eui-yong. Kim's sister Kim Yo Jong (on the right) is said to be very close to him.

On 25 July 2012, North Korean state media reported for the first time that Kim Jong Un was married to Ri Sol Ju. Ri, who was believed to be in her early 20s, had been accompanying Kim Jong Un to public appearances for several weeks prior to the announcement. According to a South Korean analyst, Kim Jong Il had hastily arranged the marriage after suffering a stroke in 2008, the two married in 2009, and they had a son in 2010. Dennis Rodman, after visiting in 2013, reported that they had a second newborn child, a daughter named Kim Ju Ae. According to South Korean intelligence sources, the couple is believed to have had a third child, a daughter, in February 2017.

On 18 November 2022, Kim Jong Un was seen reviewing key military arsenals with his daughter Ju Ae. The two were seen together again at a gathering with missile scientists later in the same month. She has since routinely accompanied him. In February 2026 South Korea's NIS assessed that Ju Ae, then aged approximately 13, was his designated successor. This was based on information including her more prominent appearances in state media, alleged policy input, and visit to the 2025 China Victory Day Parade.

Kim is sometimes accompanied by his younger sister Kim Yo Jong, who is said to be instrumental in creating his public image and organising public events for him. According to Kim Yong-hyun, a professor of North Korean studies at Dongguk University in Seoul, and others, the promotion of Yo Jong and others is a sign that "the Kim Jong Un government has ended its co-existence with the remnants of the previous Kim Jong Il government by carrying out a generational replacement in the party's key elite posts".

On 13 February 2017, Kim Jong-nam, the exiled half-brother of Kim Jong Un, was assassinated with the nerve agent VX while walking through Terminal 2 at Kuala Lumpur International Airport. Kim Jong Un is widely believed to have ordered the assassination.

Select (Note: To keep the tree of manageable size, it omits five out of the seven known legitimate children of Kim Il Sung. Other children not shown in the tree are: Kim Man-il (1944–1947; child of Kim Jong-suk), Kim Kyong-jin (born 1952; child of Kim Song-ae), Kim Yong-il (1955–2000; child of Kim Song-ae), and Kim Kyong-suk (born 1951; child of Kim Song-ae). A stillborn daughter is also omitted. Kim Il Sung was reported to have had other children with women who he was not married to; they included Kim Hyŏn-nam (born 1972). Also, only some of the descendants of Kim Jong Il and Kim Jong Un (Kim Il Sung's successors) are included.) family tree of North Korea's ruling Kim family (Note: Korean names often have a variety of transliterations into English, which can be confusing. For example, "Kim Jong Chul" may also be written "Gim Jeong-cheol" or "Kim Jŏng-ch'ŏl" among many other variations. See Korean romanization for more information.) (Note: Huss, Kan; Frost, Clay. "North Korea's First Family: Mapping the personal and political drama of the Kim clan". msnbc.com. Archived from the original on 4 February 2012. (Confirms many, but not all, of the birth and death years. See individual articles for more references.))

Kim Song-ryeong; 1810–1899
Kim Ŭngu; 1848–1878
Kim Pohyŏn; 1871–1955
Kim Hyong-jik; 1894–1926	Kang Pan Sok; 1892–1932
Kim Jong-suk; 1917–1949	Kim Il Sung; 1912–1994	Kim Song-ae; 1924–2014	Kim Yong-ju; 1920–2021
Kim Young-sook; 1947–	Song Hye-rim; 1937–2002	Kim Jong Il; 1941? (Note: Official North Korean biographies of Kim Jong Il list his birth year as 1942. The Korean calendar is based upon the Chinese zodiac which is believed to characterize one's personality. The year 1942 (Year of the Horse), in addition to being 30 years since Kim Il Sung's birth may be viewed as a better year than others, thus creating a motive to lie about a birth year.)–2011	Ko Yong-hui; 1952–2004	Kim Ok; 1964–	Kim Kyong-hui; 1946–	Jang Song-thaek; 1946–2013	Kim Pyong Il; 1954–
Kim Sol-song; 1974–	Kim Jong-nam; 1971–2017	Kim Jong Chul; 1981–	Kim Jong Un; 1983? (Note: Official North Korean biographies of Kim Jong Un list his birth year as 1982. The Korean calendar is based upon the Chinese zodiac which is believed to characterize one's personality. The year 1982 (Year of the Dog), in addition to being 70 years since Kim Il Sung's birth, may be viewed as a better year than others, thus creating a motive to lie about a birth year.)–	Ri Sol-ju c. 1986–	Kim Yo Jong; 1987–
Kim Han-sol; 1995–	Kim Ju Ae c. 2012 (Note: Birth year for Kim Ju Ae is not publicly known. She may have been born in either late 2012 or early 2013.)–

== Awards and honors ==
=== Honours ===
- Russia:
  - Jubilee Medal "75 Years of Victory in the Great Patriotic War 1941–1945" (2020) (Note: Awarded for his efforts at preserving the memory of Soviet soldiers who died during the Soviet–Japanese War (1945) and were buried in North Korea.)
  - Jubilee Medal "80 Years of Victory in the Great Patriotic War 1941–1945" (2025) (Note: Awarded for his great personal contribution to commemorating the memory of Soviet citizens who died and were buried on the territory of the DPRK.)

=== Honorary doctorates ===
- Malaysia:
  - Honorary Doctor of Philosophy (PhD) degree in Economics from HELP University (2013)

== See also ==
- Succession of Kim Jong Un

== Notes ==
Party political offices
Preceded by Kim Jong Il	General Secretary of the Workers' Party of Korea; First Secretary: 2012–2016; Chairman: 2016–2021; 2012–present	Incumbent
Preceded by Kim Jong Il	Chairman of the Central Military Commission; Acting: 2011–2012; 2012–present	Incumbent
New office	Vice Chairman of the Central Military Commission; 2010–2012; Served alongside: Ri Yong-ho	Succeeded by Choe Ryong-hae; Ri Yong-ho
Political offices
Preceded by Kim Jong Il	President of the State Affairs Commission; National Defence Commission: 2012–2016; 2012–present	Incumbent
