= Kim Il Sung bibliography =

- Official posthumous portrait of Kim Il Sung
- Plays↙: 2
- Total number of works↙: 10,800
- Important works↙: 60
- Autobiography↙: 8
- Complete Works↙: 100
- Collected Works↙: 50
- Selected Works↙: 15

Kim Il Sung (15 April 1912 – 8 July 1994) was the leader of North Korea for 46 years, from its establishment in 1948 until his death in 1994, he was posthumously declared the "Eternal President" by the Constitution of North Korea on 5 September 1998, his birthday (15 April) has been an official holiday since 1968 and was formally renamed the Day of the Sun which celebrates every year as an annual public (national) holiday in the capital Pyongyang and throughout (across) North Korea after it has been declared by Kim Jong Il in 1997.

According to North Korean sources, the works of Kim Il Sung amount to approximately 10,800 speeches, reports, books, treatises and other types of works. As of 1980, about 60 of them are considered to be particularly important by outside observers.

Kim Il Sung's works are published and republished in countless collections. These include the 100-volume Complete Works of Kim Il Sung (전집), the 50-volume Collected Works (저작집) and the 15-volume Selected Works (선집). In North Korea, his works are published by the Workers' Party of Korea Publishing House, but front organizations in Japan publish unofficial Korean-language editions as well. North Korean sources say that publishing houses in at least 170 countries have published works of Kim Il Sung in translations in more than 40 languages.

The earliest work in the Enlarged Edition of Complete Collection of Kim Il Sung's Works is from October 1926. By the time of Kim's death, the collections had ballooned to unpractical sizes with even the Selected Works "too long and costly to be used in group study, the only kind the regime felt safe in encouraging" and the Collected Works "unfit to any propaganda purpose except to lead awed schoolchildren past". With more electricity and leisure time, too, such enormous collections were no longer popular.

All writings from before the time Kim returned to North Korea (19 September 1945) are considered to be unhistorical. There is no historical record of them from the purported time period and they only began to appear in the 1970s. It is evident from both their contents written to support later viewpoints in North Korean politics, and the style of writing characteristic to Kim in his later years, that they have been written much later, specifically in the late 1960s to early 1970s. For instance, On Organizing and Waging Armed Struggle Against Japanese Imperialism, dated to December 1931, discusses little-known labor strikes in Korea far away from Kim's whereabouts in Manchuria that a young and uneducated guerrilla wouldn't have likely known about due to Japanese censorship. Another particularly egregious example dated 1 June 1937, called Proclamation, stipulates that the Japanese are forcibly drafting Koreans to invade China and ultimately join WWII, when these did not take place until July 1937 and December 1941, respectively. They do, however, bear resemblance to his written style. This is also true of his later works, with only a handful of pieces that appear to have been ghostwritten for him. Suh Dae-sook attributes the lack of a ghostwriter to an identifiable writing style that has consistently matured and the fact that few of his subordinates have lasted in North Korean politics for such a long period of time without being subject to purges. Occasionally, Kim is given notes on technical subjects, but both the policies and texts are of his own making.

Many of the later writings, too have gone through edition in subsequent publications to match the political situation, typically by removing references to the roles of the Soviet Union and China in early North Korean politics, and by removing names of purged officials.

The English editions, published by the Foreign Languages Publishing House, as Kim Il Sung Works, Kim Il Sung Selected Works, and Kim Il Sung Complete Works have reached volume 50, eight, and seven, respectively. Volume seven of Selected Works was never published in English.

Kim was most prolific when writing about the North Korean economy, but his most impactful works tend to be on the management of the Workers' Party of Korea. He did not write as much on international relations, of the Korean reunification, save for "constant and perfunctory" references in his many speeches. The military of North Korea is also underrepresented in his writings, although many additional works pertaining to it might exist but be restricted. Kim's 1967 speech On the Immediate Tasks in the Direction of the Party's Propaganda Work in the aftermath of the Kapsan faction incident, is considered one of his most important ones, but remains likewise restricted.

According to the official North Korean version, Kim Il Sung laid out his Juche ideology in the 1955 speech On Eliminating Dogmatism and Formalism and Establishing Juche in Ideological Work. It is often considered a "watershed moment" in North Korean history. Half of the speech is, however, on matters unrelated to Juche and praises the Soviets, which is ill-suited to the ideology's stress on self-reliance. For the next ten years Kim failed to elaborate on Juche, even on important occasions such as his speech to mark the tenth anniversary of the North Korean state. The concept had all but completely disappeared from the vocabulary of his works with the exception of a 1960 speech, On the Lessons Drawn From Guidance to the Work of the Kangso County Party Committee, where he passingly mentions it. The next work to deal with Juche in detail was Kim's On Socialist Construction in the Democratic People's Republic of Korea and the South Korean Revolution, a lecture he had given when visiting Indonesia. The formulation of Juche as it is known today is from a 1972 interview with Mainichi Shimbun journalists, entitled On Some Problems of Our Party's Juche Idea and the Government of the Republic's Internal and External Policies. North Korea scholar B.R. Myers thinks that these occasions are too low-profile for introducing major ideological developments, leading him to conclude that the Juche idea is merely a front.

Different editions of collections have played a significant role in the propagation of Juche. In 1960, the second edition of a collection of Kim Il Sung's speeches was published. It included Kim's On Eliminating Dogmatism and Formalism and Establishing Juche in Ideological Work, which was not considered an important work at the time. After the publication, American scholars translated the speech into English and left the word "Juche" untranslated. According to Myers, this marked the begin of the recognition of Juche as a distinct ideology.

According to Myers, Kim Il Sung's cult of personality was consciously trying to match that of Mao Zedong. Thus when Mao was renowned for his poetry, the North Koreans matched this by claiming that Kim Il Sung had written plays during the anti-Japanese struggle of the 1930s. Two plays that were allegedly written by Kim Il Sung are The Sea of Blood and The Flower Girl. Nonetheless, Kim Il Sung also wrote poems, such as one called "Brightest Star", written in 1992 to congratulate Kim Jong Il on behalf of the latter's birthday. Kim Il Sung also wrote song lyrics. Official North Korean history also attributes operas to Kim. Sometimes Kim is attributed with writing the scripts of operas and plays directly, and at other times for providing the actual authors with the plots.

Kim delivered a New Year Address since 1 January 1946. Although the tradition was likely copied from the Soviet Union, North Korea made one important distinction. In the Soviet Union, the speech was always delivered by the formal head of state instead of Stalin who held real power. Since the North Korean state had not been organized by 1946, the task fell on Kim as the head of the North Korea Bureau of the Communist Party of Korea. The speech has been delivered by the supreme leader of North Korea instead of the formal head of state ever since, making it an important policy speech identified with the leader personally.

With the Century, Kim Il Sung's eight-volume autobiography written shortly before his death, is his most popular work among North Korean readership.

== Bibliography ==
=== Works ===
| Date | Title | Notes |
|---|---|---|
| 17 October 1926 | Let Us Overthrow Imperialism (제국주의를 타도하자) | The first speech of Kim Il Sung that is said to be given in front of the members of the Down-with-Imperialism Union on its founding day. |
| December 1931 | On Organizing and Waging Armed Struggle Against Japanese Imperialism (일제를 반대하는 무장투쟁을 조직전개할데 대하여) | The speech is said to have been given in Yanji during the so-called Myongwolgu conference in winter of 1931. |
| 25 April 1932 | On the Occasion of Founding the Anti-Japanese People's Guerrilla Army (반일인민유격대창건에 즈음하여) | The speech is said to have been given in Antu County on the founding day of the "Anti-Japanese People's Guerrilla Army", which was an anti Japanese partisan army claimed to be founded by Kim. |
| 29 March 1937 | Let Us Inspire the People with Hopes of National Liberation by Advancing With Large Forces into the Homeland (대부대에 의한 국내진공작전으로 인민들에게 조국광복의 서광을 안겨주자) | The speech is claimed to be given during the Sogang conference, in front of the "Korean people's revolutionary army". |
| 1 June 1937 | Proclamation (포고) | |
| 4 June 1937 | Let Us Fight on Staunchly for the Liberation of the Fatherland (조국의광복을위하여억세게싸워나가자) | The speech is claimed to be Kim's speech that was made before he commenced the Battle of Pochonbo in 1937. |
| 20 August 1945 | For the Construction of the Party, State, and Armed Forces in the Liberated Fatherland (해방된 조국에서의 당 국가 및 무력 건설에 대하여) | |
| 17 December 1945 | On the Work of Organizations at All Levels of the Communist Party of North Korea (북조선 공산당 각급 당 단체들의 사업 에 대하여) | |
| 8 February 1946 | On the Present Political Situation in Korea and the Organization of the Provisional People's Committee of North Korea (NKPPC) (목전 조선 정치 정세와 북조선 림시인민위원회의 조직에 관하여) | |
| 15 February 1946 | Current State and Tasks of the Party (당내 정세와 당면 과업에 대하여) | |
| 10 April 1946 | The Results of the Agrarian Reform and Future Tasks (토지 개혁 의 총 결과 금후 과업) | |
| 20 June 1946 | On the Draft Labor Law (로동 법령 초안 에 대하여) | |
| 29 July 1946 | Present Political Situation and our New Duties (오늘의정치정세와우리들의새로운임무) | |
| 29 August 1946 | For the Establishment of a United Party of the Working Masses (근로 대중 의 통일 적당 의 창건 을 위하여) | |
| 26 September 1946 | On the Establishment of the Workers' Party of North Korea and the Question of Founding the Workers' Party of South Korea (북조선 로동당 의 창립 과 남 조선 로동당 의 창건 문제 에 대하여) | |
| 19 February 1947 | Report of the 1947 People's Economic Development in North Korea (1947 년 도 북조선 인민 경제 발전 에 대한 보고) | |
| 15 March 1947 | On the Elimination of Shortcomings and Errors in the Work of Some Party Organizations (일부 당 단체들의 사업 에서 나타나고 있는 오유와 결함 을 퇴치 할데 대하여) | |
| 15 August 1947 | Report Commemorating the Second Anniversary of the August 15 Liberation (8·15 해방 2 주년 기념 보고) | |
| 6 February 1948 | Summation of the 1947 Economic Plan and on the 1948 People's Economic Development Plan (1947년 계획실행총화와 1948년 인민경제발전계획에 대하여) | |
| 8 February 1948 | On the Occasion of the Founding of the Korean People's Army (조선 인민군 창건에 즈음하여) | |
| 28 March 1948 | Report to the Second Congress of the Workers' Party of North Korea on the Work of the Central Committee (북조선 로동당 제 2 차 대회 에서 한 중앙 위원회 사업 총화 보고) | |
| 10 September 1948 | Political Program of the Government of the Democratic People's Republic of Korea (조선민주주의인민공화국 정부의 정강) | |
| 1 February 1949 | The Completion of the Two-Year People's Economic Plan is the Materialistic Guarantee of the Fatherland Unification (2개년인민경제계획의 수행은 조국통일의 물질적담보) | |
| 9 September 1949 | The First Anniversary of the Founding of the Democratic People's Republic of Korea (조선민주주의인민공화국 창립 1 주년) | |
| 26 June 1950 | Every Effort for Victory in the War (모든 힘을 전쟁의 승리를 위하여) | |
| 21 December 1950 | The Present Situation and Our Tasks (현 정세와 당면 과업) | |
| 1 November 1951 | On Some Defects in the Organizational Work of Party Organization (당 단체들의 조직 사업에 있어서 몇 가지 결점들에 대하여) | |
| 4 April 1952 | Speech to the Political Workers and Security Organization Cadres (내무 기관 간부 들 과 정치 일군 들 앞에서 하신 연설) | |
| 15 December 1952 | The Organizational and Ideological Consolidation of the Party is the Basis of Our Victory (당의 조직적 사상적 강화는 우리 승리의 기초) | |
| 5 August 1953 | Everything for the Postwar Rehabilitation and the Development of the National Economy (모든 것을 전후 인민 경제 복구 발전 을 위하여!) | |
| 20 December 1953 | Precious International Aid by the Peoples of the Fraternal Countries (형제 국가 인민 들의 고귀한 국제 주의적 원조) | |
| 3 November 1954 | On Our Party Policy for the Further Development of Agricultural Management (농촌 경리 의 금후 발전 을 위한 우리 당의 정책 에 관하여) | |
| April 1955 | Every Effort for the Country's Reunification and Independence and for Socialist Construction in the Northern Half of the Republic (모든 힘을 조국의 통일 독립 과 공화국 북반부 에서 의 사회주의 건설 을 위하여) | |
| 1 April 1955 | On Further Intensifying the Class Education of the Party Members (당원 들의 계급 교양 사업 을 더욱 강화할 데 대하여) | |
| 1 April 1955 | On Eliminating Bureaucracy (관료주의 를 퇴치 할데 대하여) | |
| 4 April 1955 | On Some Questions of Party and State Work in the Present Stage of the Socialist Revolution (사회주의 혁명의 현 계단에 있어서 당 및 국가 사업의 몇 가지 문제들 에 대하여) | |
| 28 December 1955 | On Eliminating Dogmatism and Formalism and Establishing Juche in Ideological Work (사상 사업에서 교조주의와 형식주의를 퇴치하고, 주체를 확립할 데 대하여) | |
| 23 April 1956 | Report of the Works of the Central Committee to the Third Party Congress of the Workers' Party of Korea (조선 로동당 제 3 차 대회 에서 한 중앙 위원회 사업 총화 보고) | |
| 5 December 1957 | On the Work of the Party and Government Delegation Which Attended Celebrations of the Fortieth Anniversary of the Great October Socialist Revolution and the Meetings of Representatives of the Communist and Workers' Parties of Various Countries in Moscow (위대한 사회주의 10 월 혁명 40 주년 경축 행사 와 각국 공산당 및 로동당 대표 들 외 모쓰 크바 회의 에 참가 하였던 당 및 정부 대 표단 의 사업 에 관한 보고) | |
| 6 March 1958 | On the Reform of Party Works (당 사업 을 개선 할 데 대하여) | |
| 7 March 1958 | For the Successful Fulfillment of the First Five-Year Plan (제1차 5개년 계획 의 성공적인 수행 을 위하여) | |
| 29 April 1958 | For the Implementation of the Judicial Policy of Our Party (우리 당의 사법 정책 수행 을 위하여) | |
| 11 June 1958 | Everything for the Prosperity and Development of the Country (모든것을 조국 의 륭성 발전을 위하여) | |
| 5 January 1959 | On the Victory of Socialist Agricultural Cooperativization and the Further Development of Agriculture in Our Country (우리 나라 에서의 사회주의적 농업 협동화의 승리와 농촌 경리의 앞으로의 발전에 대하여) | |
| 4 September 1959 | Let Us Hold Firmly the Key Handle in Solving Problems and Concentrate Our Energy (모든 문제 해결 에서 중심 고리를 튼튼히 틀어 잡고 거기에 력량 을 집중하자) | |
| 4 December 1959 | On Several Tasks Confronting the Socialist Economic Construction (사회주의 경제 건설 에서 나서는 당면한 몇가 지 과업 들 에 대하여) | |
| 23 February 1960 | On the Lessons Drawn from Guidance to the Work of the Kangso Country Party Committee (강서군당사업지도에서얻은교훈에대하여) | The main point of the document was providing local flexibility by dispatching local administrators sent from the central government to handle the local realities with their own specific guidance principles according to their regional realities aside from the general "On the spot guidance" that are ordered by the central government. The speech is considered to be one of the defining moments of the "Chongsalli method" or "Chongsalli spirit" of Kim Il Sung. |
| 11 September 1961 | Report of the Work of the Central Committee to the Fourth Congress of the Workers' Party of Korea (조선 로동당 제 4차 대회 에서 한 중앙 위원회 사업 총화 보고) | |
| 18 December 1961 | On the Formation of the Country Cooperative Farm Management Committee (군 농업 협동 조합 경영 위원회 를 내 올데 대하여) | |
| 8 March 1962 | On Improving and Strengthening Organizational and Ideological Work of the Party (당 조직 사업 과 사상 사업 을 개선 강화할 데 대하여) | |
| 23 October 1962 | On the Immediate Tasks of the Government of the Democratic People's Republic of Korea (조선 민주주의 인민 공화국 정부 의 당면 과업 에 대하여) | |
| 8 February 1963 | Our People's Army is an Army of the Working Class, an Army of the Revolution; Class and Political Education Should Be Continuously Strengthened (우리의 인민군대는 로동 계급 의 군대, 혁명의 군대이다 계급적 정치 교양 사업 을 계속 강화 하여야 한다.) | |
| 25 February 1964 | Theses on the Socialist Rural Question in Our Country (우리나라사회주의농촌문제에관한 테제) | |
| 15 May 1964 | On the Tasks of the League of Socialist Working Youth (사회주의 로동 청년 동맹 의 과업 에 대하여) | |
| 23 June 1964 | Speech to the Delegates to the Asian Economic Seminar | |
| 14 April 1965 | On Socialist Construction in the Democratic People's Republic of Korea and the South Korean Revolution (조선민주주의인민공화국에서의사회주의건설과남조선혁명에대하여) | The work is a speech in Indonesia. |
| 10 October 1965 | On the Occasion of the Twentieth Anniversary of the Founding of the Workers' Party of Korea (조선로동당창건20주년에제하여) | |
| 5 October 1966 | The Present Situation and the Tasks of Our Party (현 정세 와 우리 당의 과업) | In this report, Kim viewed the Korean revolution as part of the revolution of the people of the world. Based on this connection with world revolutions he mentioned three problems, the revolution of the international communist world, the revolution within the DPRK and its socialist construction, and the state of the revolution in South Korea. In terms of the international communist struggle, he viewed the strengthening of anti Americanism as a solution. In terms of the DPRK, he emphasized construction of the economy and military power.In terms of South Korea, he suggested "strengthening the revolutionary capabilities of the south Korean people" by political enlightenment, strengthening of organizations, and evicting the Americans. |
| 18 October 1966 | On the Elimination of Formalism and Bureaucracy in the Party Work and Revolutionizing the Functionaries (당 사업 에서 형식주의와 관료주의를 없애며 일군 들을 혁명 화할 데 대하여) | |
| 25 May 1967 | On the Immediate Tasks in the Direction of the Party's Propaganda Work (당면한 당 선전 사업 방향에 대하여) | |
| 25 May 1967 | On the Questions of the Period of Transition from Capitalism to Socialism and the Dictatorship of the Proletariat (자본주의로부터 사회주의에로의 과도기와 프롤레타리아독재 문제에 대하여) | |
| 16 December 1967 | Let Us Embody the Revolutionary Spirit of Independence, Self-Sustenance and Self-Defense More Thoroughly in All Fields of State Activity (국가 활동의 모든 분야에서 자주, 자립, 자위의 혁명 정신을 더욱 철저히 구현 하자) | |
| 27 May 1968 | On Strengthening the Guidance of the Party Life of Party Members and Properly Implementing the Cadre Policy of Our Party (당원들에 대한 당 생활 지도 를 강 화 하며 우리 당 간부 정책 을 옳게 관철 할 데 대하여) | |
| 7 September 1968 | The Democratic People's Republic of Korea is the Banner of Freedom and Independence for Our People and a Powerful Weapon for Building Socialism and Communism (조선민주주의인민공화국은 우리 인민의 자유와 독립의 기치이며 사회주의, 공산주의 건설의 강력한 무기이다) | |
| 1 March 1969 | On Some Theoretical Problems of the Socialist Economy (사회주의 경제의 몇 가지 리론 문제에 대하여) | |
| 2 November 1970 | Report to the Fifth Congress of the Workers' Party of Korea on the Work of the Central Committee (조선 로동당 제 5 차 대회 에서 한 중앙 위원회 사업 총화 보고) | |
| 25 September 1971; 8 October 1971 | On Several Questions of Domestic and International Policies of the Workers' Party of Korea and the Government of the Republic (조선 로동당 과 공화국 정부 의 대내외 정책 의 몇 가지 문제 에 대하여) | |
| 11 October 1971 | Answers to the Questions Raised by the Iraqi Journalists' Delegation (이라크기자대표단이제기한질문에대한대답) | |
| 2 December 1971 | On Improving and Strengthening the Training of Party Cadres (당간부 양성 사업 을 개선 강화할 데 대하여) | |
| 17 September 1972 | On Some Problems of Our Party's Juche Idea and the Government of the Republic's Internal and External Policies(우리 당의 주체사상과 공화국 정보의 대내외 정책의 몇 가지 문제에 대하여) | |
| 25 December 1972 | Let Us Further Strengthen the Socialist System of Our Country (우리나라사회주의제도를더욱강화하자) | |
| 1 February 1973 | On Some Problems for the Improvement of the Management of the Socialist Economy (사회주의경제관리를개선하기위한몇가지문제에대하여) | |
| 21 February 1973 | On the Development of Ideological Revolution, Technical Revolution, and Cultural Revolution in the Farming Villages (농촌에서 사상혁명, 기술혁명, 문화혁명을 힘있게 벌릴 데 대하여) | |
| 23 June 1973 | Let Us Prevent a National Split and Reunify the Country (민족의 분렬을 방지하고 조국을 통일하자) | |
| 25 June 1973 | On the Five-point Policy for National Reunification (조국통일5대방침에대하여) | |
| 10 January 1974 | Let Us Further Consolidate and Develop the Great Success Achieved in the Building of a Socialist Countryside (사회주의 농촌 건설 에서 이룩한 위대한 성과 를 더욱 공고 발전 시키자)' | |
| 24 September 1974 | On the Situation of Our Country and Tasks of the League of Korean Youth in Japan (우리나라의정세와재일본조선청년동맹의과업에대하여) | |
| 29 November 1974 | Problems Arising From the Thorough Implementation of the Agrarian Theses (농촌 테제 의 완전한 실현 을 위하여 나서는 몇가지 문제) | |
| 3 March 1975 | Further Assist the Socialist Construction by Developing the Three Revolutions (3대혁명을힘있게벌려사회주의건설을더욱다그치자) | |
| 31 May 1975 | Answers to the Questions Raised by an AFP Correspondent (프랑스 프레스 통신사 기자가 제기한 질문에 대한 대답 or 프랑스 프레스 통신사 기자 가 제기 한 질문 에 주신 대답) | An interview of Kim Il Sung at Nouakchott, Mauritania with Jean-Christophe Mitterrand. |
| 9 October 1975 | On the Occasion of the Thirtieth Anniversary of the Founding of the Workers' Party of Korea (조선로동당창건30돐에즈음하여) | |
| 29 April 1977 | The Land Law of the Democratic People's Republic of Korea (조선민주주의인민공화국 토지법) | |
| 29 April 1977 | On the Land Law (토지법에대하여) | |
| 5 September 1977 | Theses on Socialist Education (사회주의교육에관한테제) | |
| 15 December 1977 | Let us Further Strengthen the People's Government (인민정권을더욱강화하자) | |
| 10 October 1980 | Report on the Work of the Central Committee of the Workers' Party of Korea Delivered at the Sixth Congress of the Party (조선 노동당 제 6차 대회 에서 한 중앙위원회 사업 총화 보고) | |
| 20 June 1986 | For the Development of the Non-Aligned Movement (쁠럭 불가담 운동 의 강화 발전 을 위하여) | |
| 14 November 1989 | On Developing Kangwon Province as a Good Tourist Resort (강원도를 국제관광지로 잘 꾸릴데 대하여) | . |
| 29 April 1991 | For a Free and a Peaceful New World (자유롭고 평화로운 새 세계 를 위하여) | |
| 6 April 1993 | 10 Point Programme for the Great Unity of the Whole Nation for the Reunification of the Country (조국통일을위한전민족대단결10대강령) | |
| 1992–1996 | With the Century (세기와 더불어) | |

=== Collections ===
| Date | Title | Notes |
|---|---|---|
| 1971 | Revolution and Socialist Construction in Korea: Selected Writings of Kim Il Sung | |
| 1972 | The Selected Works of Kim Il Sung: Volumes 1 – 5 Juche! The Speeches and Writings of Kim Il Sung | |
| 1975 | For the Independent, Peaceful Reunification of Korea; On Juche in Our Revolution | |
| 2001 | For an Independent World | published posthumously |
| 2003 | For the Independent, Peaceful Reunification of the Country | published posthumously |
| 2011 | The Selected Works of Kim Il Sung | published posthumously |

== See also ==
- Kim Jong Il bibliography
- Kim Jong Un bibliography
- Marxist bibliography
