= On the Juche Idea =

1982 book by Kim Jong-il

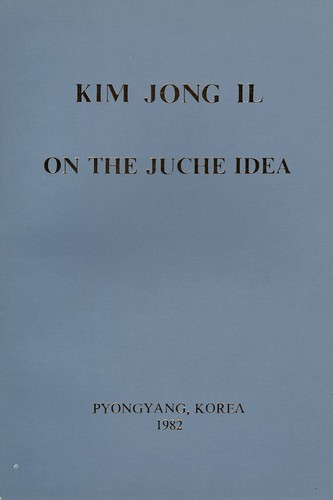
- Cover page of the English edition
- Author: Kim Jong Il
- Language: Korean
- Subject: Kim Il Sung; Philosophy; Congresses; Juche idea
- Published: 1982 Pyongyang: Workers' Party of Korea Publishing House (Korean ed.); 1982 Pyongyang: Foreign Languages Publishing House (English ed.)
- Publication date: 1982
- Publication place: North Korea
- English publication date: 1982
- Media type: Print
- Pages: 84 (English ed.)
- OCLC: 9475822
- Dewey Decimal: 320.5323095193
- LC Class: MLCS 83/5240 (J)

- On the Juche Idea
- Hangul: 주체 사상에 대하여
- Hanja: 主體 思想에 對하여
- RR: Juche sasange daehayeo
- MR: Chuch'e sasange taehayŏ

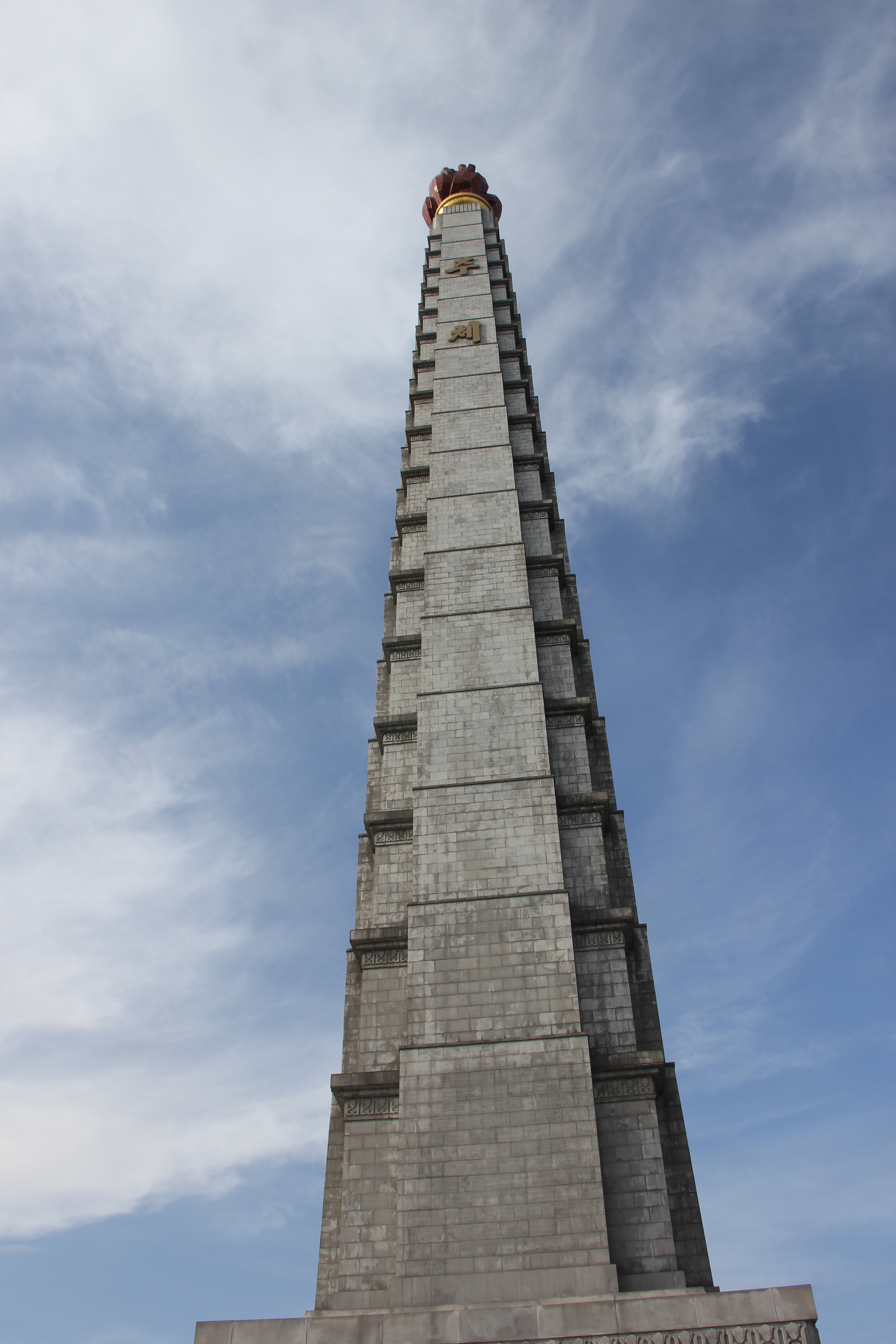
The Juche Tower and On the Juche Idea were both introduced for the 70th birth anniversary of Kim Il-sung, whose Juche philosophy from thereon was exclusively interpreted by Kim Jong Il.

On the Juche Idea (Korean: 주체 사상에 대하여) is a treatise attributed to North Korean leader Kim Jong Il on the North Korean Juche ideology. It is considered the most authoritative work on Juche.

The work legitimized Kim as the sole bona fide interpreter of the ideology. The treatise systemizes Kim Jong Il and his father Kim Il Sung's thought on the Juche philosophy. The treatise marks Juche's departure from the materialism of Marxism–Leninism and posits the consciousness of the masses as dependent on the working class leader.

According to Kim Jong Il, the Juche idea is composed of a philosophical principle, socio-historical principles, and guiding principles. The philosophical principle can be summarized with Kim Il Sung's maxim that "man is the master of everything and decides everything." The socio-historical principles entail that the working masses are the subject of history. The guiding principles are: independent stance, creative method, and giving precedence to ideological consciousness. Emphasis on independence in particular has given raise to Kim's Songun, or military first, politics.

== Background ==
On the Juche Idea is one of Kim Jong Il's major writings on Juche and considered the most authoritative work on it. It is a standard textbook on the subject. The treatise is a systematization of both President Kim Il Sung and Kim Jong Il's thought on Juche philosophy and offers the most comprehensive account of Juche. Kim Il Sung's thought in particular began to be formulated as an original philosophy from the 1970s onward. On the Juche Idea was sent to the national seminar on the Juche idea on 31 March 1982 held on the occasion of the 70th birth anniversary of Kim Il-sung, who was honored on 15 April 1982 by the unveiling of the Juche Tower in Pyongyang.

In the treatise, Kim Jong Il links the birth of the Juche idea to Kim Il Sung's personal history as a guerrilla fighter during the anti-Japanese struggle. On the Juche Idea thus furthered Kim Il-sung's cult of personality. Publishing the treatise helped Kim Jong Il to gain legitimacy, particularly emphasizing his intellectual prowess. At the time of writing Kim Jong Il was working as the ideological chief of the country on behalf of his father. Although it was probably ghostwritten for him, by being named as the author Kim Jong Il became the "one and only bona fide interpreter of the 'immortal Juche idea' of Kim Il Sung."

== Content ==
In his early years of revolutionary activities, the leader [Kim Il Sung] was well versed in Marxism-Leninism. But he did not confine himself to applying Marxism-Leninism to the Korean revolution but pioneered a new phase of revolutionary theory from a steadfast Juche-based standpoint and resolved the problems arising in the revolutionary practice from a unique angle.

— On the Juche Idea

Kim Jong Il explains that Juche is a departure from Marxism–Leninism rather than simply a reinterpretation of it. According to Kim, Juche offers not only an "independent and creative" direction to the Korean revolution, but also establishes a new era for human history. It is philosophically idealist as opposed to the materialism of Marxism. The work is considered somewhat abstract in style.

In comparison to Kim Il Sung's writings, Kim Jong Il pays particular attention to consciousness and the concept of the leader. These two are often linked. According to Charles K. Armstrong, the main message of the treatise is that "regardless of material circumstances, the masses owe unquestioning obedience to the Great Leader, who alone can bring the masses to consciousness", adding that the "message would be extremely useful for the North Korean state in the difficult years ahead", referring to the death of Kim Il-sung and the North Korean famine in the 1990s, a decade after the publication of On the Juche Idea.

In On the Juche Idea, Kim Jong Il divides Juche into three components: the philosophical principle, the socio-historical principles, and the guiding principles of the Juche idea.

=== Philosophical principle ===
The philosophical principle entails that Juche is a man-centered philosophy. Man has independence(자주성,Chajusong), creativity(창조성, Changjosong) and consciousness(의식성, Uisiksong), which places man at the center of the world. This is described by the maxim coined by Kim Il Sung in a 1972 interview with Japanese journalists: "man is the master of everything and decides everything." Man transforms the world and embodies Chajusŏng, or independence and autonomy. By putting man at the center, Kim Jong Il denies the existence of any supernatural power, although the Juche philosophy itself can be said to have quasi-religious elements.

=== Socio-historical principles ===
The socio-historical principles of Juche can be summarized as follows: the working masses are the subject of history. Human history is the struggle of the masses to realize their independence and defend it. Man's socio-historical mission is to transform both nature and society. Here Kim departs from Marxism–Leninism by primarily setting man against nature rather than the proletariat against the bourgeois class.

=== Guiding principles ===
There are three guiding principles in Juche:

1. First, independent stance means Juche in ideology, independence in politics, self-sufficiency in economy and self-reliance in defense. These four aspects of the independent stance can be already found in Kim Il Sung's 1965 speech given in Indonesia, On Socialist Construction in the Democratic People's Republic of Korea and the South Korean Revolution(조선민주주의인민공화국에서의사회주의건설과남조선혁명에대하여). Even though On the Juche Idea mentions economy, it is not given precedence. Words like "development" and "growth" are more often used to refer to ideology rather than economy. However, noting that an economy built on "self-reliance does not mean building an economy in isolation", Kim does hint at limited economic reforms. Sure enough, a law on joint-ventures was passed in 1984.
2. The second principle, creative method, means that all problems arising in the revolution and construction are to be solved by relying on the creativity of the masses.
3. The third and final guiding principle is giving precedence to ideological consciousness over all other work.

== Legacy ==
On the Juche Idea has been since used as a justification for Kim Jong Il's Songun, or army-first, politics. The justification can be found in an aspect of one of the guiding principles of Juche, which Kim has "elevated": self-reliance in defense. Kim went on to publish "The Workers' Party of Korea Is a Juche-type Revolutionary Party which Inherited the Glorious Tradition of the DIU(조선로동당은 영광스러운 ㅌ.ㄷ.의 전통을 계승한 주체형 혁명적 당이다)" in October 1982 and focusing in it more on Kim Il Sung's guerrilla activities.

== See also ==
- Kim Jong Il bibliography
- On the Art of the Cinema – Kim Jong Il's application of Juche on art and literature
- On Eliminating Dogmatism and Formalism and Establishing Juche in Ideological Work – Kim Il Sung's "Juche Speech"
- With the Century – Kim Il Sung's autobiography
