= Let Us March Forward Dynamically Towards Final Victory, Holding Higher the Banner of Songun =

2012 speech by Kim Jong-un

Let Us March Forward Dynamically Towards Final Victory, Holding Higher the Banner of Songun Speech Delivered at the Military Parade Held in Celebration of the Centenary of the Birth of Generalissimo Kim Il Sung April 15, Juche 101 (2012)
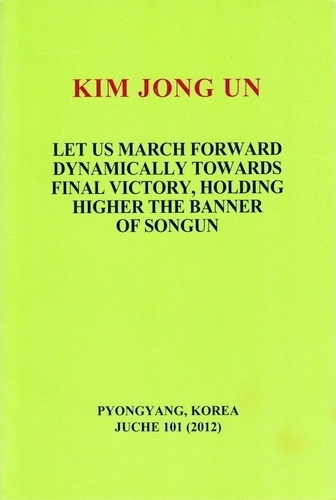
- Author: Kim Jong Un
- Original title: 선군의 기치를 더 높이 추켜들고 최후승리를 향하여 힘차게 싸워나가자
- Language: Korean
- Subject: Politics
- Publication date: 15 April 2012
- Publication place: North Korea
- Media type: Print
- OCLC: 987580865

Let Us March Forward Dynamically Towards Final Victory, Holding Higher the Banner of Songun (Korean: 선군의 기치를 더 높이 추켜들고 최후승리를 향하여 힘차게 싸워나가자) is a speech by Kim Jong Un on 15 April 2012, given to commemorate the centenary of the birth of Kim Il Sung. It was his first major public speech after succeeding his father Kim Jong Il after his death in 2011. He had given at least one speech, Let Us Brilliantly Accomplish the Revolutionary Cause of Juche, Holding Kim Jong Il in High Esteem as the Eternal General Secretary of Our Party, to party officials the week before.

== Background ==
Kim delivered the speech at the Kim Il-sung Square in Pyongyang. He delivered it in 20 minutes. The speech was broadcast on North Korean television. Kim's public speech was noted for departing from the customs of his father Kim Jong Il, who spoke in public extremely rarely. A song, "Onwards Toward the Final Victory", was created on the basis of the speech.

== Synopsis ==
In the speech, Kim tells officials to respect Kim Il Sung and Kim Jong Il. He makes 16 mentions of the leaders, 11 of which refer to both as if they are a single unit. The speech places heavy emphasis on the Songun (military-first) ideology. Kim says the army is tasked with safeguarding the leading Kim dynasty.

== See also ==
- Kim Jong Un bibliography
- Songun
