= Workers' Party of Korea Publishing House =

Publisher in North Korea

- Emblem of the Workers' Party of Korea
- Parent company: Workers' Party of Korea
- Status: Active
- Founded: 1945
- Country of origin: North Korea
- Headquarters location: Pyongyang
- Distribution: National
- Key people: Ri Yong-chol (director-general, editor-in-chief)
- Publication types: Books, magazines, posters
- Nonfiction topics: Politics
- Owner: Workers' Party of Korea

- Workers' Party of Korea Publishing House
- Hangul: 조선로동당출판사
- Hanja: 朝鮮勞動黨出版社
- RR: Joseon rodongdang chulpansa
- MR: Chosŏn rodongdang ch'ulp'ansa

The Workers' Party of Korea Publishing House (WPKPH, Korean: 조선로동당출판사) is the principal publishing house of the Workers' Party of Korea (WPK) and one of the two main publishers in the country. It publishes magazines and books on politics, such as the works of Kim Il Sung and Kim Jong Il, posters and works of fiction. The current director-general and editor-in-chief is Ri Yong-chol.

== Organization ==
The publishing house is under the control of the WPK's Propaganda and Agitation Department and is the party's most important publisher. It was founded in October 1945 in Pyongyang, where it is still based. It is one of the two main publishers in North Korea, the other one being the Foreign Languages Publishing House.

=== Directors ===
The current director-general and editor-in-chief is Ri Yong-chol.

- Kim Yong-hak (1980s)
- Yang Kyong-pok (1990s)
- Ryang Kyong-bok (2000s)
- Ri Yong-chol (2010s)

== Publications ==
The publishing house publishes books on politics as well as fiction. According to North Korean sources, they include:

the immortal masterpieces of the Great Leader [Kim Il Sung] and party documents in a number of different forms, educational materials on the revolutionary tradition, books on party policy, various educational materials for ideological education by the party, various lecture and propaganda materials, and various reference materials concerning the party work, and thus arms party officials, party members, and workers with the revolutionary thought of the Great Leader and the party policy based on it.

This includes works of Kim Il Sung and Kim Jong Il in Korean, including their selected (sŏnjip), collected (chŏjakchip) and complete works (chŏnjip).

In addition to books, it publishes posters and the magazine Kulloja, the theoretical monthly of the party. During the Cold War, it published works of the leader of communist Romania Nicolae Ceaușescu in return for Editura Politică publishing those of Kim Il Sung.

Some multi-volume publications by the publishing house include:

- Among the People
- Collection of Kim Il Sung's Anecdotes
- General Kim Jong Il, Sun of Songun
- Glorifying the Era of Juche
- History of Anti-Japanese Armed Struggle (Enlarged Edition)
- Complete Collection of Kim Il Sung's Works
- Complete Collection of Kim Il Sung's Works (Enlarged Edition)
- Complete Collection of Kim Jong Il's Works
- Reminiscences of the Anti-Japanese Guerillas
- Selected Works of Kim Jong Il (Enlarged Edition)
- With the Century

== See also ==
- Dietz Publishing House of the Socialist Unity Party of Germany
- Kim Il Sung bibliography
- Kim Jong Il bibliography
- Kim Jong Un bibliography
- North Korean literature
- List of magazines in North Korea
