= Kim Jong Il bibliography =

- Official posthumous portrait of Kim Jong Il
- Complete Collection↙: 63
- Selected Works↙: 24

Kim Jong Il (16 February 1941 – 17 December 2011) was the Supreme Leader of North Korea from 1994 to 2011. He was proclaimed with posthumous title as the "Eternal Leader of the Party and the Revolution" on 12 January 2012. Following his death in December 2011, the holiday was formally renamed the Day of the Shining Star which begins on 16 February and lasts for two days every year, where celebrations are observed throughout the country. Pyongyang has observances such as mass gymnastics, music performances, fireworks displays, military demonstrations and mass dancing parties. Boulevards are lined up with flags and banners. Millions of people visit the Kumsusan Palace of the Sun where both leaders lay in state, and is considered one of the most important national public holidays in North Korea, often viewed as second only to the "Day of the Sun" (Kim Il Sung's birthday) on 15 April. The name "Shining Star" refers to state propaganda claims that a bright star appeared over Mount Paektu near the Chinese border at the time of his birth.

According to North Korean sources, Kim Jong Il published some 890 works during a period of his career from June 1964 to June 1994. (Note: 19 June 1964 is when Kim started his party work, at the Organization Department of the Central Committee of the Workers' Party of Korea.) According to the Korean Central News Agency (KCNA), the number of works from 1964 to 2001 was 550. In 2000, it was reported that the Workers' Party of Korea Publishing House has published at least 120 works by Kim. In 2009, KCNA put the numbers as follows:

At least 354,000 copies of [Kim Jong Il's works] were translated into nearly 70 languages and came off the press in about 80 countries in the new century. There were more than 500 activities for studying and distributing the works in at least 120 countries and regions in 2006. The following year witnessed a total of more than 600 events of diverse forms in at least 130 countries and regions. And 2008 saw at least 3,000 functions held in over 150 countries and regions for the same purpose.

Two collections exist, the Selected Works of Kim Jong Il (김정일선집) and the Complete Collection of Kim Jong Il's Works (김정일전집). Both contain forged works that Kim never wrote, included to give readers the impression that he was working with ideologically formulating the Juche idea in his youth. In reality, Kim only sporadically talked about the topic. When he did, mentions were typically backdated. For instance, a speech published in 1984 called On Some Questions in Understanding the Juche Philosophy (주체철학의 이해에서 제기되는 몇 가지 문제에 대하여) is dated February 1974 and contains a plea that "it would be advisable not to publish my talk for the present" in an effort to explain why it had not been published immediately.

The Selected Works of Kim Jong Il (Enlarged Edition), whose publishing has continued posthumously, runs into volume 24 in Korean, and to volume 15 in English. Volumes three to eight were never published in English. The fact that new volumes are being added in such a peculiar order could also be an indication that the project is not a priority for the North Korean regime.

The Complete Collection of Kim Jong Il's Works is currently in volume 63. The earliest work in this collection is from July 1952, when Kim would have been only 11 years old.

Kim Jong Il did not enjoy speaking in public. That is why he chose to break with the tradition of New Year addresses delivered to live audiences that his father had. During Kim Jong Il's rule, New Year addresses were always published jointly in three newspapers – Rodong Sinmun, Joson Inmingun, and Chongnyon Jonwi – instead.

There is a "Kim Jong Il's Works Exhibition House" (로작전시관) dedicated to his works in North Korea, holding 1,100 of his works and manuscripts.

In his teens and university years, Kim Jong Il wrote poems – notably "O Korea, I will Add Glory to Thee" (조선아 너를 빛내리). Kim Jong Il also wrote song lyrics.

Kim wrote particularly much on the arts. For instance 22 out of 46 works in volume one of his Selected Works (1964–1969) are on the topic. His first truly major literary work was also on the theme, On the Art of the Cinema (1973).

== Bibliography ==
| Date | Title | Notes |
|---|---|---|
| 6 April 1961 | Worshipping Big Powers and Depending on Foreign Forces Is the Way to National Ruin (사대와 외세의존은 망국의 길이다) | The work is a discussion with students of Kim Il Sung University. |
| 22 April 1964 | On Improving the Work of the Youth League to Meet the Requirements of the Developing Situation (현실발전의 요구에 맞게 청년동맹사업을 개선강화할 데 대하여) | Speech given to Socialist Patriotic Youth League, then known as the Democratic Youth League of Korea. |
| 12 June 1964 | The Basic Tasks Facing the Korean Central News Agency (조선중앙통신사의 기본임무) | |
| 21 August 1964 | Let Us Make a New Advance in the Rural Economy in South Hwanghae Province (황해남도농촌경리발전에서 새로운 전환을 일으키자) | |
| 15 September 1964 | Regarding the Need to Produce More Revolutionary Films for the Education of Soldiers (군인교양에 이바지할 혁명적인 영화를 많이 만들어야 한다) | |
| 16 September 1964 | On Improving Party Guidance Relating to the Preservation of Historical Sites and Relics (력사유적과 유물보존사업에 대한 당적지도를 강화할데 대하여) | |
| 18 October 1964 | Let the Air Force Pilots Be Completely Prepared Both Politically and Militarily (비행사들을 정치군사적으로 튼튼히 준비시키자) | |
| 10 December 1964 | Let Us Concentrate All Our Efforts on the Creation of Revolutionary Works of Art and Literature (혁명적인 문학예술작품창작에 모든 힘을 집중하자) | |
| 8 January 1965 | Let Us Make Party Work Thorough Work with People (당사업을 철저히 사람과의 사업으로 전환시키자) | |
| 15 February 1965 | Look After the People in a Responsible Manner as a Mother Would Do with Her Children (어머니다운 심정으로 인민생활을 책임적으로 돌봐야 한다) | |
| 27 April 1965 | On Giving Wide Publicity to the Leader's Greatness Among the South Korean People (수령님의 위대성을 남조선인민들에게 널리 선전할데 대하여) | |
| 9 May 1965 | Let Us Strengthen Friendship and Solidarity with the Newly-Emergent Countries (신흥 세력 나라들과의 친선 단결 을 강화하자) | |
| 26 January 1966 | The Democratic National Rights of Our Compatriots in Japan Must Be Completely Guaranteed (재일 동포들의 민주주의적 민족 권리는 철저히 보장되여야 한다) | |
| 7 February 1966 | On Developing a New Type of Revolutionary Literature (새로운 혁명 문학을 건설할 데 대하여) | |
| 26 February 1966 | Let Us Make New Advances in the Production of Revolutionary Movies (혁명적 영화 창작에서 새로운 전환을 일으키자) | |
| 20 May 1966 | On Correctly Analyzing and Reviewing the History of the Preceding Revolutionary Ideology of the Working Class (선행한 로동계급의 혁명사상사를 정확히 분석총화할데 대하여) | |
| 6 June 1966 | On Improving Guidance of Children's Union Work (소년단 사업에 대한 지도를 더욱 강화하자) | |
| 17 June 1966 | Let Us Improve Educational Work in Order to Produce Able Cadres of the Nation (교육사업을 개선하여 유능한 민족간부를 키워내자) | |
| 28 October 1966 | Let Us Enhance the Role of the Media in Implementing the Decisions of the Party Conference (당대표자회결정관철에서 출판보도물의 역할을 높이자) | |
| 27 December 1966 | On Completing the Film the Family of Choe Hak Sin and Making It a Masterpiece Which Contributes to Anti-US Education (예술영화 《최학신의 일가》를 반미교양에 이바지하는 명작으로 완성할데 대하여) | |
| 10 February 1967 | On Creating Realistic Typification of Human Character and Life Thoroughly (인간성격과 생활에 대한 사실주의적 전형화를 깊이있게 실현할데 대하여) | |
| 7 April 1967 | Let Us Improve Commodity Supply (상품공급사업을 개선강화하자) | |
| 7 June 1967 | Let Us Compose More Music Which Will Contribute to Education in the Party's Monolithic Ideology (당의 유일사상교양에 이바지할 음악작품을 더 많이 창작하자) | |
| 13 June 1967 | On Having a Correct Understanding of the Political, Moral and Material Incentives (정치도덕적자극과 물질적자극에 대한 옳바른 리해를 가질데 대하여) | |
| 15 June 1967 | On Stamping Out the Ideologically Evil Consequences of the Anti-Party, Counterrevolutionary Elements and Establishing the Party's Monolithic Ideological System (반당반혁명분자들의 사상여독을 뿌리빼고 당의 유일사상체계를 세울데 대하여) | |
| 20 June 1967 | On Establishing the 15 April Literary Production Company (4.15문학창작단을 내올데 대하여) | |
| 30 June 1967 | On Certain Problems in Improving the Guidance of the Korean Scriptwriting Company (조선영화문학창작사에 대한 지도사업을 잘하기 위한 몇가지 문제에 대하여) | |
| 3 July 1967 | On the Firm Establishment of the Party's Monolithic Ideological System Among Writers and Artistes (작가, 예술인들속에서 당의 유일사상체계를 철저히 세울데 대하여) | |
| 3 July 1967 | On the Intensification of Ideological Information Work for a Revolutionary Advance in the Building of the Economy and Strengthening of Our Defences (경제건설과 국방건설에서 혁명적앙양을 일으키기 위한 사상선전을 강화할데 대하여) | |
| 30 July 1967 | On a Few Problems Arising in the Work of Broadcasting (방송사업에서 제기되는 몇가지 문제에 대하여) | |
| 16 August 1967 | On the Effective Embodiment of the Party's Monolithic Ideology in Artistic and Literary Works (문학예술작품에 당의 유일사상을 구현하기 위한 사업을 실속있게 할데 대하여) | |
| 8 October 1967 | Young People Must Take the Lead in the Efforts to Implement the Rural Theses (청년들은 농촌테제관철을 위한 투쟁에서 앞장에 서야 한다) | |
| 12 October 1967 | Children of the Revolutionary Martyrs Must Become Political and Ideological Bodyguards Protecting and Defending the Leader (혁명가유자녀들은 수령님을 정치사상적으로 옹호보위하는 친위전사가 되여야 한다) | |
| 2 February 1968 | Let Us Make Full Preparations to Mobilize for Battle and Oppose the US Imperialists' Moves to Start War (미제의 전쟁도발책동에 대처하여 전투 동원준비를 철저히 갖추자) | |
| 13 March 1968 | The Duty of the Assistant Company Commander in Charge of Political Affairs (정치부중대장의 임무) | |
| 6 April 1968 | Some Problems Arising in the Creation of Masterpieces (대작창작에서 제기되는 몇가지 문제) | |
| 21 July 1968 | Let Us Develop Ryanggang Province into a Firm Base for Education in Revolutionary Traditions (량강도를 혁명전통교양의 거점으로 튼튼히 꾸리자) | |
| 8 October 1968 | Let Us Prepare Ourselves to Be Soldiers Unfailingly Faithful to the Party in the Field of Art and Literature (당에 끝없이 충직한 문예전사로 준비하자) | |
| 25 October 1968 | On the Direction Which Musical Creation Should Take (음악창작방향에 대하여) | |
| 1 November 1968 | On Describing Life Truthfully in Revolutionary Films (혁명적영화창작에서 생활을 진실하게 그릴데 대하여) | |
| 19 January 1969 | On Enhancing the Role of Party Organizations and Political Organs in the People's Army (인민군대 당조직과 정치기관들의 역할을 높일데 대하여) | |
| 25 February 1969 | Officials Must Constantly Improve Their Method and Style of Work (일군들은 사업방법과 작풍을 끊임없이 개선하여야 한다) | |
| 24 March 1969 | Let Us Cultivate the Revolutionary Spirit of Paektu Among the Rising Generation (새 세대들을 백두의 혁명정신으로 무장시키자) | |
| 20 April 1969 | Work with Artistes Should Be Carried Out in Line with Political Principles (예술인들과의 사업을 정치적방법으로 하여야 한다) | |
| 29 April 1969 | You Must Be the Workers Capable of Moving the Hearts of the People (사람의 마음을 움직일줄 아는 일군이 되여야 한다) | |
| 29 May 1969 | On Correcting Deviations in Implementing the Policy on Intellectuals (인테리정책관철에서 나타난 편향을 바로잡을데 대하여) | |
| 12 August 1969 | On Further Strengthening Education in Revolutionary Traditions Among Young People and Children (청소년 들 속 에서 혁명 전통 교양 을 더욱 강화할 데 대하여) | |
| 27 September 1969 | Some Problems Which Arose in Adapting the Immortal Work the Sea of Blood to the Screen (불후의 고전적명작 《피바다》를 영화로 완성하는데서 나서는 몇가지 문제) | |
| 16 January 1970 | Writers Can Produce Good Works Only When They Are Well-Informed (작가들은 아는 것이 많아야 좋은 작품을 쓸 수 있다) | |
| 14 February 1970 | On the Ideological and Artistic Characteristics of the Immortal Work the Fate of a Self-Defence Corps Man (불후의 고전적 명작 <한 자위단원의 운명>의 사상예술적 특성 에 대하여) | |
| 19 February 1970 | On Producing Works of Art and Literature Which Depict in Depth the Process of People Shaping Their Revolutionary Outlook on the World (문학예술작품에 사람들의 혁명적 세계관 형성과정을 깊이있게 그릴 데 대하여) | |
| 4 March 1970 | On Proper Evaluation and Treatment of the Cultural Heritage of Our Nation with a Correct Viewpoint and Attitude (민족문화유산을 옳은 관점과 립장을 가지고 바로 평가처리할데 대하여) | |
| 29 March 1970 | On Intensifying Political and Ideological Education Among Public Security Officers (사회안전일군들속에서 정치사상교양사업을 강화할데 대하여) | |
| 18 June 1970 | Let Us Create More Revolutionary Films Based on Socialist Life (사회주의현실을 반영한 혁명적영화를 더 많이 창작하자) | |
| 16 October 1970 | On Establishing the Habit of Working and Living in a Revolutionary Way Among the Officials in the Field of Cinematic Art (영화예술부문 일군들속에서 혁명적으로 일하며 생활하는 기풍을 세울데 대하여) | |
| 3 December 1970 | Let Us Thoroughly Transform Cadres into Revolutionaries by Intensifying Party Life (당생활을 강화하여 간부들을 철저히 혁명화하자) | |
| 12 February 1971 | A Few Problems Arising in Film Production (영화 창작 사업 에서 나서는 몇가지 문제) | |
| 15 February 1971 | On Effecting a New Upsurge in Film-Making (영화 창작 에서 새로운 앙양 을 일으킬 데 대하여) | |
| 28 April 1971 | On Thoroughly Establishing a Revolutionary Film-Making System of Our Own (우리 식 의 혁명적 영화 창조 체계 를 철저히 세울 데 대하여) | |
| 18 May 1971 | Party Officials Must Become Men of Real Ability, Equipped with a High Level of Political and Practical Qualifications (당일 군 은 높은 정치 실무적 자질 을 갖춘 실력가 가 되 여야 한다) | |
| 14 June 1971 | On Improving the Work of the Radio-Television Broadcasting Committee (중앙 방송 위원회 사업 을 개선 할데 대하여) | |
| 8 July 1971 | On Thoroughly Applying the Principles of Socialist Pedagogy in Education in the Cinema (영화 예술 교육 사업 에서 사회주의 교육학 의 원리 를 철저히 구현 할데 대하여) | |
| 17 July 1971 | The Revolutionary Opera the Sea of Blood Is a New Opera of a Type of Our Own (혁명가극 <피바다>는 우리 식의 새로운 가극) | |
| 3 August 1971 | On Further Intensifying Party Work in the Field of Cinematic Art (영화예술부문의 당사업을 더욱 강화할데 대하여) | |
| 1 October 1971 | Let Us Inspire the Young People with the Spirit of Continuous Revolution (청년들을 계속혁명의 정신으로 무장시키자) | |
| 11 October 1971 | On Improving Party Guidance to the Work of Planning the National Economy (인민경제계획화사업에 대한 당적지도를 강화할데 대하여) | |
| 16 October 1971 | Works of Art Are the Fruits of Creative Workers' Passion and Study (예술작품은 창작가의 열정과 탐구의 열매이다) | |
| 28 October 1971 | Let Us Produce Revolutionary Operas That Are High in Ideological and Artistic Quality by Strictly Applying the Principle of Creating Revolutionary Operas of the Type of the Sea of Blood (<피바다>식혁명가극 창작원칙을 철저히 구현하여 사상예술성이 높은 혁명가극을 창조하자) | The speech emphasized directions to improve theater. |
| 29 October 1971 | For the Celebration of the 60th Birthday of the Leader as the Greatest National Holiday (수령님의 탄생 60돐을 민족최대의 명절로 맞이하기 위하여) | |
| 28 December 1971 | On Properly Conducting the Work with the People with Complex Backgrounds (복잡한 군중과의 사업을 잘할데 대하여) | |
| 26 June 1972 | On the Tasks Facing the 25 April Sports Club (4.25체육선수단앞에 나서는 과업에 대하여) | |
| 11 July 1972 | On Improving the Work of Dong and People's Neighbourhood Units (동, 인민반사업을 개선강화하자) | |
| 14 July 1972 | Let Us Struggle Resolutely to Implement the Three Principles of National Reunification (조국통일3대원칙을 관철하기 위하여 견결히 투장하자) | |
| 22 August 1972 | On Enhancing the Ideological and Artistic Levels of Television Broadcasting (텔레비죤방송의 사상예술적수준을 높일데 대하여) | |
| 6 September 1972 | On Effecting a Revolutionary Turn in the Production of Works of Art and Literature (문학예술작품창작에서 혁명적인 전환을 일으킬데 대하여) | |
| 17 October 1972 | The Duty of the Political Commissar of a Unit (부대 정치위원의 임무) | |
| 7 November 1972 | On Creating a New Revolutionary Drama That Meets the Juche Era (주체시대에 맞는 새로운 혁명연극을 창작할데 대하여) | |
| 1 March 1973 | On Consolidating and Developing the Successes Achieved in the Creation of Revolutionary Operas (혁명가극건설에서 이룩한 성과를 공고발전시킬데 대하여) | |
| 11 April 1973 | On the Art of the Cinema (영화예술론) | |
| 12 July 1973 | Let Us Enhance the Sense of Responsibility and Role of Teachers in the Universal Eleven-Year Compulsory Education (전반적11년제의무교육을 실시하는데서 교원들의 책임성과 역할을 높이자) | |
| 28 February 1974 | On Breaking Outdated Patterns and Bringing About a Fresh Change in Party Work (당사업에서 낡을 틀을 마스고 새로운 전환을 일으킬데 대하여) | |
| 2 April 1974 | On Some Questions in Understanding the Juche Philosophy (주체철학의 리해에서 제기되는 몇가지 문제에 대하여) | |
| 9 April 1974 | On the Further Development of the Public Health Service (인민보건사업을 더욱 발전 시킬데 대하여) | |
| 7 May 1974 | Our Party's Media Is a Powerful Ideological Weapon Which Contributes to Modelling the Whole of Society on the Juche Idea (우리 당 출판보도물은 온 사회의 김일성주의화에 이바지하는 위력한 사상적무기이다) | |
| 10 June 1974 | Improving the Work of Party Organizations of Commissions and Ministries Under the Administration Council (정무원 위원회, 부당조직들의 사업을 개선강화할데 대하여) | |
| 4 September 1974 | On Strengthening Ideological Education Among the Party Members and Working People (당원들과 근로자들속에서 사상교양사업을 강화할데 대하여) | |
| 4 September 1974 | On the Art of Opera (가극예술에 대하여) | |
| 6 December 1974 | Let Us Create More Revolutionary Literary Works Which Meet the Requirements of Our Socialist Life (우리의 사회주의현실이 요구하는 혁명적 문학작품을 더 많이 창작하자) | |
| 30 April 1975 | On Training More Women Cadres (녀성간부들을 더 많이 키울데 대하여) | |
| 6 May 1975 | For the Further Development of Our Juche Art (우리의 주체예술을 더욱 발전시키기 위하여) | |
| 1 July 1975 | Let Us Give a Strong Impetus to the Three Revolutions and Effect a Fresh Advance in Production (3대혁명을 힘있게 벌려 생산에서 새로운 앙양을 일으키자) | |
| 2 October 1976 | On Correctly Understanding the Originality of Kimilsungism (김일성주의의 독창성을 옳게 인식할데 대하여) | |
| 8 March 1978 | On Improving Film Distribution to Meet the Requirements of Party Ideological Work ( 당사상사업의 요구에 맞게 영화보급사업을 개선강화할데 대하여) | |
| 25 December 1978 | Let Us Increase the Party's Fighting Efficiency and Bring About a Fresh Turn in the Building of Socialism (당의 전투력을 높여 사회주의 건설 에서 새로운 전환 을 일으키자) | |
| 28 April 1979 | On Thoroughly Establishing the System of Party Leadership (당의 령도 체계 를 철저히 세울 데 대하여) | |
| 8 March 1981 | On Further Improving Party Ideological Work (당사상사업을 더욱 개선 강화할데 대하여) | |
| 31 March 1981 | For the Development of Juche-Oriented Literature and Art (주체적 문학 예술을 더욱 발전시키기 위하여) | |
| 13 July 1981 | On Improving Party Guidance to the Work with Young People and Children (청소년 사업에 대한 당적 지도를 더욱 강화할데 대하여) | |
| 31 March 1982 | On the Juche Idea (주체 사상에 대하여) | |
| 17 October 1982 | The Workers' Party of Korea Is a Juche-Type Revolutionary Party Which Inherited the Glorious Tradition of the DIU (조선로동당은 영광스러운 ㅌ.ㄷ.의 전통을 계승한 주체형 혁명적 당이다) | Published in the magazine Kulloja.Later published on the Rodong sinmun on October 21 of the same year. |
| 21 November 1982 | On Improving and Strengthening Judicial and Prosecution Work (사법검찰사업을 개선 강화할데 대하여) | |
| 15 December 1982 | On Increasing Obedience to Socialist Laws (사회주의 법무 생활을 강화할 데 대하여) | |
| 14 January 1983 | Let Us Effect a Revolutionary Change in Party Work to Meet the Challenge of the Present Situation (현 정세에 맞게 당 사업에서 혁명적 전환을 일으키자) | |
| 15 January 1983 | Let Us Consolidate and Develop the Success Achieved in the Creation of Works of Art and Literature (문학 예술 작품 창작 에서 이룩한 성과를 더욱 공고 발전 시키자) | |
| 3 May 1983 | Let Us Advance Under the Banner of Marxism-Leninism and the Juche Idea (맑스 · 레닌주의와 주체 사상의 기치를 높이 들고 나아가자) | |
| 16 February 1984 | On Further Improving the Standard of Living of the People (인민 생활을 더욱 향상 시킬 데 대하여) | |
| 10 March 1984 | On Building Up the Revolutionary Ranks and Further Accelerating Socialist Construction (혁명 대오를 튼튼히 꾸리며 사회주의 건설을 더욱 힘있게 다그칠 데 대하여) | |
| 3 May 1984 | On Further Improving the Work of the Trade Unions (직업 동맹 사업을 더욱 강화 할데 대하여) | |
| 15 July 1984 | On Further Enhancing the Role of the Party Organizations of the Central Authorities (중앙 기관 당 조직 들의 역할 을 더욱 높일 데 대하여) | |
| 22 July 1984 | On Further Developing Educational Work (교육 사업을 더욱 발전 시킬데 대하여) | |
| 19 November 1984 | On Improving Land Management (국토 관리 사업 을 개선 강화할 데 대하여) | |
| 1 March 1985 | Let Us Create More Good Music, Dances and Films Congenial to the National Sentiments of Our People and the Aesthetic Sense of the Times (우리 인민의 민족적 감정과 시대적 미감 에 맞는 훌륭한 음악 무용과 영화를 더 많이 창작 하자) | |
| 21 April 1985 | On the Further Improvement of the Health Service (보건 사업을 더욱 개선 강화할 데 대하여) | |
| 30 April 1985 | On Strengthening Party Guidance in the Activities of the Working People's Organizations (근로 단체 사업 에 대한 당적 지도 를 강화할 데 대하여) | |
| 3 August 1985 | On the Further Development of Science and Technology (과학 기술을 더욱 발전 시킬데 대하여) | |
| 14 December 1985 | On Stepping Up the Work of the Union of Agricultural Working People (농업 근로자 동맹 사업 을 더욱 강화할 데 대하여) | |
| 3 January 1986 | For the Strengthening and Development of the Party and the Revolutionary Ranks and a Fresh Upsurge in the Construction of the Socialist Economy (당과 혁명 대오의 강화 발전과 사회주의 경제 건설의 새로운 앙양을 위하여) | |
| 17 May 1986 | Let Us Effect a New Upsurge in Producing Works of Revolutionary Art and Literature (혁명적 문학예술작품 창 작에서 새로운 앙양을 일으키자) | |
| 19 May 1986 | On Popularizing Physical Training and Sport and Developing Sporting Skills Rapidly (체육을 대중화하며 체육 기술 을 빨리 발전시킬데 대하여) | |
| 15 July 1986 | On Some Problems of Education in the Juche Idea (주체 사상 교양 에서 제기 되는 몇가지 문제 에 대하여) | |
| 23 November 1986 | Let Us Step Up the Three-Revolution Red Flag Movement (3대혁명 붉은 기 쟁취 운동 을 더욱 힘있게 벌리자) | |
| 11 April 1987 | On Further Developing Mass Gymnastics (집단 체조를 더욱 발전시킬 데 데 대하여) | |
| 25 September 1987 | Let Us March Forward Dynamically Along the Road of Socialism and Communism Under the Unfurled Banner of the Anti-Imperialist Struggle (반제 투쟁의 기치를 높이 들고 사회주의, 공산주의 길로 힘차게 나아가자) | |
| 10 October 1987 | On Establishing the Juche Outlook on the Revolution (주체의 혁명관을 튼튼히 세울 데 대하여) | |
| 30 November 1987 | On Establishing Revolutionary Traits Among Writers and Artistes in Their Creative Work and Life (작가, 예술인 들 속 에서 혁명적 창작 기풍 과 생활 기풍 을 세울 데 대하여) | |
| 15 December 1987 | Information Workers Must Establish a Political Standard and Work Effectively | |
| 10 January 1988 | Let Us Make a Revolutionary Climate Prevail Throughout the Party (전 당에 혁명적 당풍을 철저히 세우자) | |
| 20 April 1988 | On Improving the Spirit of Service Among Service Workers (봉사 일군 들 속 에서 봉사 성 을 높일 데 대하여) | |
| 20 April 1988 | On the Art of the Drama (연극 예술 에 대하여) | |
| 15 May 1988 | Let Us All Live and Struggle Like Heroes (모두 다 영웅적 으로 살며 투쟁 하자) | |
| 23 August 1988 | On Firmly Establishing a Revolutionary Outlook on the Leader Among the Officials (일군 들 속 에서 혁명적 수령 관 을 튼튼히 세울 데 대하여) | |
| 10 October 1988 | Officials Must Work in a Responsible Way by Displaying the Revolutionary Spirit (일군 들은 혁명 성 을 발휘 하여 일 을 책임 적 으로 하여야 한다) | |
| 12 October 1988 | The Present Times and the Tasks Facing Young People (현시대와청년들의임무) | |
| 5 January 1989 | On Making the Cultural and Emotional Life Prevail Throughout the Society (온 사회 에 문화 정서 생활 기풍 을 세울 데 대하여) | |
| 2 June 1989 | On Developing Physical Training and Sports (체육 을 발전 시킬 데 대하여) | |
| 9 June 1989 | Let Us Strengthen the Party and Further Improve Its Leadership Role (당 을 강화 하고 그 령도적 역할을 더욱 높이자) | |
| 26 October 1989 | Answers to Questions Raised by the General Director of Granma, the Organ of the Central Committee of the Communist Party of Cuba (꾸바 신문 < 그 란마 > 사장 이 제기 한 질문 에 대한 대답) | The first interview ever conducted with Kim by foreign journalist. The interview was conducted ten days before the fall of the Berlin wall, when there was uncertainty in the eastern bloc, in the interview, Kim presents a positive outlook on the future of the revolution of Cuba and the DPRK, saying it can be protected. |
| 27 November 1989 | On Further Improving Labour Administration (로동 행정 사업 을 더욱 개선 강화할 데 대하여) | |
| 28 December 1989 | Let Us Highly Display the Korean-Nation-First Spirit (조선 민족 제일주의 정신 을 높이 발양 시키자) | |
| 1 January 1990 | Let Us Effect a Change in Party Work and Socialist Construction to Brighten the 1990s (당 사업 과 사회주의 건설 에서 전화 를 일으켜 1990 년대 를 빛내 이자) | |
| 11 January 1990 | On Some Tasks of Ideological Education of the Party (당 사상 교양 사업에서 나서는 몇 가지 과업에 대 하여) | |
| 17 January 1990 | Let Us Prepare the Young People Thoroughly as Reliable Successors to the Revolutionary Cause of Juche (청년 들을 주체 혁명 위업 의 믿음직한 계승자 로 튼튼히 준비 시키자) | |
| 25 February 1990 | Let Us Compose Revolutionary Musical Pieces Which People Love to Sing (인민이 사랑하고 즐겨 부르는 혁명적인 음악작품 을 창작하자) | |
| 5 April 1990 | On Training the Korean Youth in Japan into Reliable Successors to the Patriotic Cause (재일 조선 청년 들을 애국 위업 이 믿음직한 계승자 로 키울 데 대하 여) | |
| 30 May 1990 | On Some Problems of the Ideological Foundation of Socialism (사회주의의 사상적 기초에 관한 몇 가지 문제에 대하 여) | |
| 2 June 1990 | On Effecting a Sweeping Revolution in Light Industry (경공업 혁명 을 철저히 수행 할데 대하여) | |
| 13 September 1990 | On Improving Finance and Banking (재정 은 행사 업 을 개선 강화할 데 대하여) | |
| 20 September 1990 | Let Us Further Enhance the Role of Intellectuals in the Revolution and Construction (혁명 과 건설 에서 인테리 들의 역할 을 더욱 높이 자) | |
| 3 October 1990 | The Workers' Party of Korea Organizes and Guides All the Victories of Our People (조선로동당은 우리 인민 의 모든 승리 의 조직자이며 향도자이다) | |
| 10 October 1990 | Juche-Oriented Theory on Party Building Is a Guideline to Be Adhered to in the Building of a Working-Class Party (주체 의 당 건설 리론 은 로동 계급 의 당 건설 에서 틀어 쥐고 나가야 할 지도적 지침 이다) | |
| 25 October 1990 | On Having a Correct Viewpoint and Understanding of the Juche Philosophy (주체 철학 에 대한 올바른 관점 과 리해 를 가질 데 대하여) | |
| 30 November 1990 | On the Art of Dance (무용 예술론) | |
| 8 December 1990 | On Improving the Creation and Dissemination of Music (음악 창작 과 보급 사업 을 개선 을 강화할 데 대하여) | |
| 27 December 1990 | Socialism of Our Country Is a Socialism of Our Style as the Embodiment of the Juche Idea (우리 나라 사회주의 는 주체 사상 을 구현 한 우리식 사회주의 이다) | |
| 5 January 1991 | Let Us Further Strengthen Party Work and Vigorously Step Up Socialist Construction (당 사업 을 더욱 강화 하여 사 회 주의 건설 을 힘있게 다 그치자) | |
| 5 May 1991 | Our Socialism Centred on the Masses Shall Not Perish (인민 대중 중심 의 우리 식 사회주의 는 필승 불패 이다) | |
| 10 May 1991 | We Must Strengthen Party Cells (당세포를 강화하자) | |
| 21 May 1991 | On Architecture (건축 예술론) | |
| 25 May 1991 | Let Us Bring About a New Upsurge in Geological Prospecting (지질 탐사 사업 에서 새로운 전환 을 일으키자) | |
| 1 June 1991 | Let Us Train True Party Workers Who Will Carry Forward the Cause of Juche-Oriented Party Building (주체 의 당 건설 위업 을 대 를 이어 빛내 어 나갈 참된 당일 군 을 키워 내자) | |
| 1 July 1991 | Let Us Firmly Equip Ourselves with the Theory of Juche-Oriented Socialist Economic Management (주체 의 사회주의 경제 관리 리론 으로 튼튼히 무장 하자) | |
| 17 July 1991 | On the Art of Music (음악 예술론) | |
| 26 August 1991 | Young Men and Women, Be the Vanguard Unfailingly Loyal to the Party and the Leader (청년 들은 당 과 수령 에게 끝없이 충실한 청년 전위 가 되자) | |
| 16 October 1991 | On Fine Art (미술론) | |
| 28 October 1991 | Let Us Make a Fresh Turn in the Development of Science and Technology (과학 기술 발전 에서 새로운 전환 을 일으키자) | |
| 5 December 1991 | Let Us Develop the Revolutionary Traditions of Juche Down Through Generations (주체 의 혁명 전통 을 빛나게 계승 발전 시키자) | |
| 1 January 1992 | Let Us Improve Party Work and Brighten Korean–Style Socialism (당 사업 을 강화 하여 우리식 사회주의 를 더욱 빛내 이자) | |
| 3 January 1992 | The Historical Lesson in Building Socialism and the General Line of Our Party (사회주의 건설 의 력사적 교훈 과 우리 당 의 총 로선) | |
| 20 January 1992 | On Juche Literature (주체 문학론) | |
| 4 February 1992 | Let Us Further Strengthen Our Single-Hearted Unity and Give Full Play to the Korean-Nation-First Spirit (일심 단결 을 더욱 강화 하며 조선 민족 제일 주의 정신 을 높이 발양 시키자) | |
| 4 February 1992 | On Strengthening the People's Army and Creating a Social Climate in Which Prominence Is Given to Military Affairs (인민 군대 를 강화 하며 군사 를 중시 하는 사회적 기풍 을 세울데 대하여) | |
| 4 April 1992 | On Developing Light Industry and Conducting Effective Research into Economic Management (경공업 을 발전 시키며 경제 관리 연구 사업 을 잘할 데 대하여) | |
| 17 April 1992 | Let Us Glorify the Great Achievements of the Respected Leader Comrade Kim Il Sung (경애 하는 수령 김일성 동지 의 위대한 업적 을 빛내 여 나가자) | |
| 23 May 1992 | Let Us Effect a Fresh Turn in the Creation of Art and Literature on the Basis of the Success in the Production of the Multi-Part Film the Nation and Destiny (다 부작 예술 영화 ' 민족 과 운명 ' 의 창작 성과 에 토 대하여 문학 예술 건 설 에서 새로운 전환 을 일으키자) | |
| 22 July 1992 | Some Problems Arising in Improving Public Health (인민 보건 사업 을 개선 강화 하는데서 나서는 몇가지 문제) | |
| 23 July 1992 | On Sticking Fast to Revolutionary Principles and the Revolutionary Stand()혁명적 원칙 과 입장 을 철저히 지킬 데 대하여 | |
| 10 August 1992 | On Further Developing Forestry Industry (임업 을 더욱 발전 시킬데 대하여) | |
| 4 September 1992 | Let Us Further Improve City Management in Conformity with the Requirements of the Developing Situation (현실 발전 의 요구 에 맞게 도시 경영 사업 을 더욱 개선 강화 하자) | |
| 10 October 1992 | On the Fundamentals of Revolutionary Party Building (혁명적 당 건설 의 근본 문제 에 대하여) | |
| 12 November 1992 | On Some Problems Arising in Party, State and Economic Work (당, 국가, 경제 사업 에서 나서는 몇 가지 문제 에 대하여) | |
| 14 November 1992 | Socialism Is the Lifeline of Our People (사회주의는 우리 인민의 생명이다) | |
| 20 November 1992 | Let Us Train True Public Security Workers Who Staunchly Safeguard the Socialism of Our Own Style (우리식 사회주의 를 견결히 옹호 보위 하는 참다운 사회 안전 일군 들을 키 워 내자) | |
| 9 December 1992 | Intellectuals Should Become Fighters True to the Party and the Socialist Cause | |
| 21 December 1992 | Let Us Bring the Advantages of Our People's Government into Fuller Play (우리 인민 정권의 우월성을 높이 발양시키자) | |
| 5 January 1993 | Let Us Develop Our Youth Movement to a New, Higher Level (우리나라 청년 운 동 을 새로운 높은 단계 로 발전 시키자) | |
| 17 February 1993 | Let Us Increase the Might of Socialism by Channelling Efforts into Party and Economic Work (당 사업 과 경제 사업 에 힘 을 넣어 사회주의 위력 을 더욱 강화 하자) | |
| 26 February 1993 | On Directing Efforts to the Work with the Young People (청년 들 과 의 사업 에 힘 을 넣을 데 대하여) | |
| 1 March 1993 | Abuses of Socialism Are Intolerable (사회주의에 대한 훼방은 허용 될 수 없다): | |
| 8 March 1993 | On Declaring a State of War Readiness for the Whole Country, All the People and the Entire Army (전국, 전민, 전군에 준 전시 상태를 선포함에 대하여) | |
| 13 November 1993 | On Developing Traditional Music in Keeping with Modern Tastes (민족 음악 을 현대적 미감 에 맞게 발전 시킬 데 대하여) | |
| 1 January 1994 | Let Us Further Consolidate the Position of the Socialist Revolution Through Effective Party Work (당 사업 을 잘 하여 사회주의 혁명 진지를 더욱 튼튼히 다지자) | |
| 24 May 1994 | On Thoroughly Transforming Cadres into Revolutionaries as Required by the Developing Revolution (혁명 발전의 요구에 맞게 간부들을 철저히 혁명화 할데 대하여) | |
| 11 July 1994 | Let Us Hold the Great Leader Comrade Kim Il Sung in High Esteem as the Eternal President of Our Republic (위대한 수령 김일성동지를 우리 공화국의 영원한 주석으로 높이 모시자) | |
| 16 October 1994 | Let Us Hold the Great Leader in High Esteem Forever and Accomplish His Cause (위대한 수령님을 영원히 높이 모시고 수령님의 위엄을 끝까지 완성하자) | |
| 20 October 1994 | Let Us Bring About a Fresh Improvement in the People's Standard of Living by Enhancing the Role of the County (군의 역할을 높여 인민생활에서 전환을 일으키자) | |
| 28 October 1994 | Message of Thanks to the Entire Population Who Deeply Mourned the Death of the Great Leader Comrade Kim Il Sung (감사문-위대한 수령 김일성동지의 서거에 심심한 애도의 뜻을 표시하여준 전체 인민들에게) | |
| 1 November 1994 | Socialism Is a Science (사회주의는 과학이다) | |
| 31 December 1994 | Let Us Make Our Country, Our Motherland, Ever More Prosperous, True to the Great Leader Comrade Kim Il Sung's Intention (위대한수령님의 뜻을 받들어 내 나라 내 조국을 더울 부강하개 하자) | |
| 1 January 1995 | Let Us Strive Energetically for a New Victory, Firmly United Behind the Party (당의 두리에 굳게 뭉쳐 새로운 승리를 위하여 힘차게 싸워나가자) | |
| 1 February 1995 | On Some Problems Arising in the Implementation of the Party's Foreign-Trade-First Policy (당의 무역제일주의방침을 관철하는데서 나서는 몇가지 문제) | |
| 3 February 1995 | Congratulatory Message to Members of the League of Socialist Working Youth and Children's Union Who Participated in an Expedition of the 1 000-Ri Journey for National Liberation (축하문-광복의 천리길답사행군에 참가한 사로청원들과 소년단원들에게) | |
| 2 March 1995 | On Some Problems Arising in Strengthening Chongryon Organizationally and Ideologically (초련을 조직사상적으로 강화하는데서 나서는 몇가지 과업에 대하여) | |
| 8 March 1995 | Women Are a Powerful Force for Pushing Ahead with the Revolution and Construction (녀성들은 혁명과 건설을 떠밀고나가는 힘있는 력량이다) | |
| 24 May 1995 | On Developing the Movement of Koreans in Japan onto a New, Higher Stage (재일조선인운동을 새로운 높은 단계에로 발전시킬데 대하여) | |
| 19 June 1995 | Giving Priority to Ideological Work Is Essential for Accomplishing Socialism (사상사업을 앞세우는것은 사회주의위업수행의 필수적요구이다) | |
| 2 October 1995 | The Workers' Party of Korea Is the Party of the Great Leader Comrade Kim Il Sung (조선로동당은 위대한 수령 김일성동지의 당이다) | |
| 25 December 1995 | Respecting the Forerunners of the Revolution Is a Noble Moral Obligation of Revolutionaries (혁명선배를 존대하는것으 혁명가들의 숭고한 도덕의리이다) | |
| 14 January 1996 | Let Us Live Not Merely for Today but for Tomorrow (오늘을 위한 오늘에 살지 말고 래일을 위한 오늘에살자) | |
| 20 January 1996 | On the Mission and Duty of the Kim Il Sung Socialist Youth League (김일성사회주의청년동맹의 사명과 임무에 대하여) | |
| 11 February 1996 | The Great Leader Comrade Kim Il Sung Will Always Be with Our People (위대한 수령 김일성동지는 영원히 우리 인민과 함께 계신다) | |
| 26 February 1996 | On Imbuing the Whole Society with Communist Moral Traits (온 사회의 공산주의도덕기풍을 세울데 대하여) | |
| 26 March 1996 | Ryongmun Cavern Is Really Marvellous and Beautiful (룡문대굴은 신묘하고 아름다운 지하명승이다) | |
| 22 April 1996 | On Some Problems Arising in Improving Economic Work (경제사업을 개선하는데서 나서는 몇가지 문제에 대하여) | |
| 26 April 1996 | Let Us Produce a Greater Number of Masterpieces of Art and Literature (문학예술부문에서 명작을 더 많이 창작하다) | |
| 26 July 1996 | The Juche Philosophy Is an Original Revolutionary Philosophy (주체철학은 독창적인 혁명철학이다) | |
| 11 August 1996 | On Bringing About a Fresh Change in Land Management (국토관리사업에서 새로운 전환을 일으킬데 대하여) | |
| 24 August 1996 | Let Us Exalt the Brilliance of Comrade Kim Il Sung's Idea on the Youth Movement and the Achievements Made Under His Leadership (김일성동지의 청년운동사상과 령도업적을 빛내여나가자) | |
| 1 October 1996 | On Intensifying University Education as a Requisite for the Development of the Revolution (혁명발전의 요구에 맞게 대학교육을 강화할데 대하여) | |
| 14 October 1996 | Officials Must Live and Work in the Spirit of the Arduous March (일군들은 고난의 행군정신으로 살며 일해야 한다) | |
| 1 January 1997 | On Bringing About a Revolutionary Turn in the Party Work This Year (올해에 당사업에서 혁명적전환을 일으킬데 대하여) | |
| 24 January 1997 | Let Us Make This Year a Year of a Revolutionary Turn in Socialist Economic Construction (올해를 사회주의경제건설에서 혁명적 전환의 해로 되게 하자) | |
| 5 February 1997 | Congratulatory Message to Those Attending the National Conference of the 15 July Top Honour Prize-Winning Senior Middle School Students (축 하 문 전국고등중학교 7.15최우등상 수상자대회 참가자들에게) | |
| 17 March 1997 | On Emulating the Revolutionary Soldier Spirit (혁명적군인정신을 따라배울데 대하여) | |
| 26 March 1997 | Let Us Thoroughly Implement the Party's Policy on Raising Grass-Eating Domestic Animals in Large Numbers (풀먹는집짐승을 많이 기를데 대한 당의 방침을 철저히 관철하자) | |
| 19 June 1997 | On Preserving the Juche Character and National Character of the Revolution and Construction (혁명과 건설에서 주체성과 민족성을 고수할데 대하여) | |
| 30 June 1997 | On Further Developing Fish Culture (양어를 더욱 발전시킬데 대하여) | |
| 4 August 1997 | Let Us Carry Out the Great Leader Comrade Kim Il Sung's Instructions for National Reunification (위대한 수령 김일성동지의 조국통일 유훈을 철저히 관철하자) | |
| 10 September 1997 | Some Immediate Problems in Economic Work (당명한 경제사업의 몇가지 문제) | |
| 23 September 1997 | Kuwollsan Pleasure Ground Is a Precious Asset of the Country to Be Handed Down to Posterity (구월산유원지는 후대들에게 물려줄 조국의 귀중한 재부이다) | |
| 12 October 1997 | Mangyongdae Revolutionary School Is the Training Centre of the Backbone That Will Succeed to the Juche Blood (만경대혁명학원은 주체의 혈통을 이어나갈 핵심골간양성기지이다) | |
| 16 January 1998 | Let Us Bring About a Fresh Turn in Economic Work and the People's Standard of Living by Following the Example of Jagang Province (자강도의 모범을 따라 경제사업과 인민생활에서 새로운 전환을 일으키자) | |
| 22 February 1998 | Strengthening the People's Army Is an Essential Guarantee for Victorously Accomplishing the Revolutionary Cause of Juche (인민군대를 강화하는것은 주체혁명위업을 승리적으로 완성하기 위한 기본담보이다) | |
| 18 April 1998 | Let Us Reunify the Country Independently and Peacefully Through the Great Unity of the Entire Nation (온 민족이 대단결하여 조국의 자주적평화통일을 이룩하자) | |
| 1 October 1998 | On Bringing About a Revolution in Potato Farming (감자농사에서 혁명을 일으킬데 대하여) | |
| 22 November 1998 | On Intensifying Class Education Through the Sinchon Museum (신천박물관을 통한 계급교양사업을 강화할데 대하여) | |
| 1 January 1999 | Let Us Make This Year One in Which a Major Advance Is Made in the Building of a Great, Prosperous and Powerful Country (올해를 강성대국건설의 위대한 전환의 해로 빛내이자) | |
| 29 September 1999 | Let Us Further Enhance the Role of the Primary Organizations of the Youth League (청년동맹초급조직들의 역할을 더욱 높이자) | |
| 27 October 1999 | Holding the Great Comrade Kim Il Sung in High Esteem Is the Noblest Moral Obligation of Our Party and People (위대한 김일성 동지를 높이 모시는것은 우리당과 인민의 가장 숭고한 도덕의리이다) | |
| 1 January 2000 | On Making a Decisive Advance in the Building of a Great, Prosperous and Powerful Socialist Country (사회주의강성대국건설에서 결정적전진을 이룩할데 대하여) | |
| 24 January 2000 | Improving the Layout of Fields Is a Great Transformation of Nature for the Prosperity of the Country, a Patriotic Work of Lasting Significance (토지정리는 나라의 부강발전을 위한 대자연개조사업이며 만년대계의 애국위업이다) | |
| 22 March 2000 | On Intensifying Education in the Revolutionary Traditions Through the Revolutionary Battle Sites and Historic Sites (혁명전적지, 혁명사적지를 통한 혁명전통 교양을 강화할데 대하여) | |
| 9 May 2000 | On Putting Fish Farming on a Scientific and Intensive Basis (양어를 과학화, 집약화할데 대하여) | |
| 27 June 2000 | The Merited Chorus of the Korean People's Army Must Become the Bugler of Advance That Supports the Party's Songun Politics in the Van (조선인민군공훈합창단은 당의 선군정치를 앞장에서 받들어 나아가는 진격의 나팔수가 되어야 한다) | |
| 30 June 2000 | National Reunification Must Be Realized Independently by the Concerted Efforts of Our Nation Itself (조국통일은 우리 민족끼리 힘을 합쳐 자주적으로 실현하여야 한다) | |
| 13 November 2000 | The Youth Hero Motorway Is a Great Creation Produced by Our Party's Idea of Valuing the Youth (청년영웅도로는 우리 당의 청년중시 사상이 낳은 위대한 창조물이다) | |
| 3 January 2001 | Let Us Make This Year a Turning Point in Opening the Road of Advance in the New Century (올해를 새 세기의 진격로를 열어 나가는데서 전환의 해로 되게 하자) | |
| 28 January 2001 | On Improving the Training of Computer Specialists (콤퓨터수재양성사업을 강화할데 대하여) | |
| 31 January 2001 | Become Officials of the Kim Chaek Type Who Are Boundlessly Faithful to the Party's Ideology and Leadership (당의 사상과 령도에 끝없이 충실한 김책형의 일군이 되자) | |
| 11 March 2001 | The 21st Century, a New Century, Is an IT Era (새 세기, 21세기는 정보산업의 시대이다) | |
| 12 April 2001 | Let Us Enhance the Role of the Primary Information Workers of the Party as Required by the Revolutionary Advance in the New Century (새 세기 혁명적 진군의 요구에 맞게 당 초급 선전 일군들의 역할을 더욱 높이자) | |
| 30 April 2001 | South Hwanghae Province Should Stand in the Van of Socialist Rural Construction (황해남도는 사회주의농촌건설에서 앞장서 나아가야 한다) | |
| 13 May 2001 | On Bringing About a Fresh Turn in the Development of Fruit Farming (과수업발전에서 새로운 전환을 가져올데 대하여) | |
| 24 July 2001 | Answers to Questions Raised by Itar-Tass (김정일 동지께서 로씨야 이따르-따쓰통신사가 제기한 질문에 주신 대답) | |
| 5 September 2001 | On Extensively Developing Poultry Farming on the Basis of the Latest Science and Technology (최신 과학 기술에 기초하여 가금업을 대대적으로 발전 시킬데 대하여) | |
| 19 September 2001 | Kim Chaek University of Technology Is a Powerful Base of Our Country for Training People Talented in Science and Technology (김책 공업 종합 대학은 나라 의 위력한 과학 기술 인재 양성 기지 이다) | |
| 21 September 2001 | The Question-And-Answer Study Method Should Be Developed Steadily and in a Fresh Way (문답식 학습 방법을 끊임없이 새롭게 발전 시켜 나가야 한다) | |
| 18 November 2001 | Journalists and Other Men of the Pen Are Ideological Standard-Bearers Who Staunchly Champion Our Ideology, Our System and Our Cause (기자, 언론인 들은 우리의 사상, 우리의 제도, 우리의 위업을 견결히 옹호 고수하는 사상적 기수이다) | |
| 3 December 2001 | Improving Officials' Practical Abilities At Present Is a Pressing Requirement of Our Revolution (현 시기 일군 들의 실력 을 높이는 것은 우리 혁명 의 절박한 요구 이다) | |
| 19 December 2001 | The People of Jagang Province Should Become Standard-Bearers for the Building of a Great, Prosperous and Powerful Country as Befit the Creators of the Kanggye Spirit (자강도사람들은 강계정신의 창조자답게 강성대국건설의 기수가 되여야 한다) | |
| 26 February 2002 | On Having a Correct Understanding of Nationalism (민족주의에 대한 옳바른 리해를 가질데 대하여) | |
| 6 March 2002 | Let Us Build Our Country into a Beautiful Land of the Age of the Workers' Party Through Effective Forest and Water Conservation (치산치수사업을 힘있게 벌려 조국산천을 로동당시대의 금수강산으로 꾸리자) | |
| 4 June 2002 | On Making a New Leap Forward in the Economic Work in South Hamgyong Province in Line with the Requirements of the New Century (새 세기의 요구에 맞게 함경남도의 경제사업에서 새로운 앙양을 일으킬데 대하여) | |
| 15 August 2002 | The Grand Mass Gymnastics and Artistic Performance Arirang Is a World-Class Masterpiece Representative of the New Century (대집단체조와 예술공연 《아리랑》은 새 세기를 대표하는 세계적인 대걸작이다) | |
| 5 September 2002 | Let Us Discharge the Obligations Proper to a Citizen of the DPRK with Consciousness of Civic Duty (공민적자각을 안고 공화국공민의 본분을 다해나가자) | |
| 8 September 2002 | On Positively Sustaining the Fine National Traditions of Our People (우리 인민의 우수한 민족적전통을 적극 살려 나갈데 대하여) | |
| 14 September 2002 | Answers to Questions Raised by the President of Kyodo News Service (일본 교도통신사 사장이 제기한 질문에 대한 대답) | |
| 25 November 2002 | Let Us Open the Way to a New Victory with the Same Revolutionary Faith, Will and Courage as Possessed by President Kim Il Sung (위대한 수령님의 혁명적신념과 의지, 배짱으로 새로운 승리의 길을 열어나가자) | |
| 11 December 2002 | Let Us Bring About a New Upswing in Agricultural Production on the Basis of the Achievements in the Large-Scale Land Realignment and Irrigation Construction (대규모의 토지 정리 와 관개 건설의 성과에 토대하여 농업 생산에서 새로운 앙양을 일으키자) | |
| 29 January 2003 | The Songun-Based Revolutionary Line Is a Great Revolutionary Line of Our Era and an Ever-Victorious Banner of Our Revolution (선군혁명로선은 우리 시대의 위대한 혁명로선이며 우리 혁명의 백전백승의 기치이다) | |
| 3 February 2003 | Journalists and Writers Should Become Fighters of the Songun Revolution Who Support the Party with Revolutionary Pens (기자, 작가들은 혁명의 필봉으로 당을 받드는 선군혁명투사가 되여야 한다) | |
| 10 February 2003 | On Establishing a Socialist, Cultured Way of Life Appropriate to the Songun Era (선군시대에 맞는 사회주의적생활문화를 확립할데 대하여) | |
| 27 March 2003 | Let Us Train the Talented Artistes Demanded by the Songun Era (선군시대가 요구하는 훌륭한 예술인재를 키워내자) | |
| 21 May 2003 | On Thoroughly Implementing Our Party's Policy on Agricultural Revolution (우리 당의 농업혁명방침을 철저히 관철할데 대하여) | |
| 10 July 2003 | Open Letter to All Voters (공개서한 전국의 모든 선거자들에게) | |
| 28 October 2003 | Officials Should Become Devoted Servants of the People (일군들은 인민을 위하여 헌신하는 인민의 참된 복무자가 되여야 한다) | |
| 7 April 2004 | Revolutionary Comradeship Is the Basis of Single-Hearted Unity and the Driving Force of Our Revolution (혁명적동지애는 일심단결의 기초이며 우리 혁명의 추진력이다) | |
| 10 May 2004 | Artistic Performance by KPA Officers' Wives Is a Paradigm of Mass-Based Art and Cultural Activities in the Songun Era (군인가족예술소조공연은 선군시대 군중문화 예술의 본보기이다) | |
| 11 August 2004 | On Effecting a Fresh Upturn in Capital Construction (기본건설에서 새로운 전환을 일으킬데 대하여) | |
| 12 October 2004 | On Bringing About an Upturn in Soybean Farming (콩농사에서 전환을 일으킬데 대하여) | |
| 6 April 2005 | Kimilsungia Is an Immortal Flower That Has Bloomed in the Hearts of Mankind in the Era of Independence (김일성화는 자주시대 인류의 마음속에 피여난 불멸의 꽃이다) | |
| 5 September 2008 | The Democratic Peoples' Republic of Korea Is a Juche-Oriented Socialist State with Invincible Might (조선민주주의인민공화국은 불패의 위력을 지닌 주체의 사회주의 국가이다) | |

== See also ==
- Juche
- Pulgasari, a motion picture epic produced by Kim Jong Il
- Kim Il Sung bibliography
- Kim Jong Un bibliography
- Marxist bibliography
