= On Further Improving Party Ideological Work =

1981 work by Kim Jong-il

On Further Improving Party Ideological Work: Concluding Speech at the National Meeting of Party Propagandists 8 March 1981
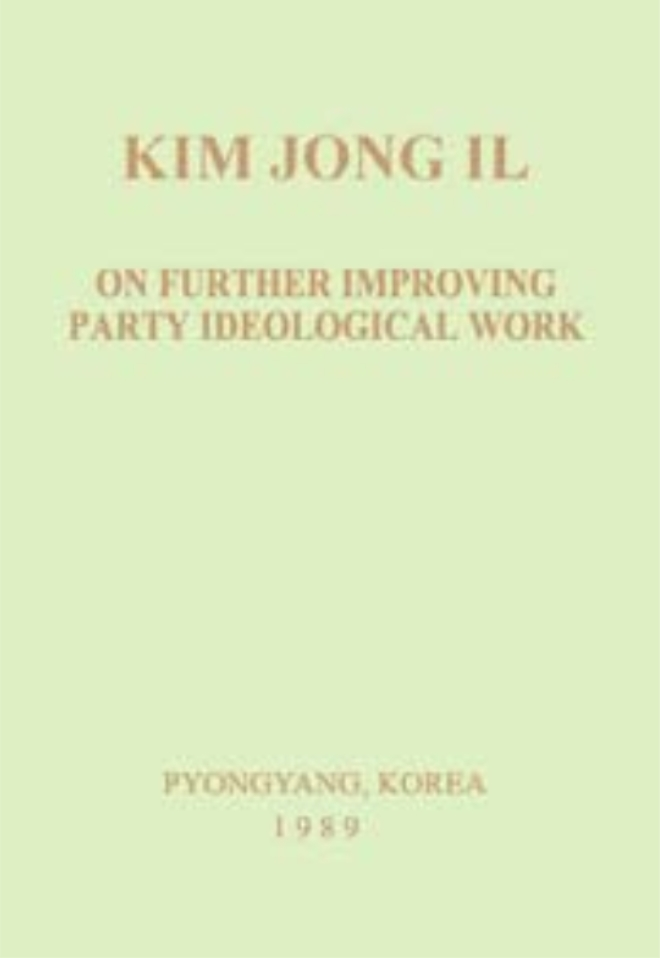
- Author: Kim Jong Il
- Subject: Workers' Party of Korea
- Publisher: Foreign Languages Publishing House
- Publication date: 1981
- Publication place: North Korea
- English publication date: 1989
- Pages: 45
- OCLC: 221611471

On Further Improving Party Ideological Work (Korean: 당 사상 사업 을 더욱 개선 강화할 데 대하여) was the 8 March 1981 concluding speech by Kim Jong Il at the National Meeting of Party Propagandists in North Korea.

== See also ==
- Kim Jong Il bibliography
