= On Eliminating Dogmatism and Formalism and Establishing Juche in Ideological Work =

1955 work by Kim Il Sung

On Eliminating Dogmatism and Formalism and Establishing Juche in Ideological Work Speech to Party Propagandists and Agitators, 28 December 1955
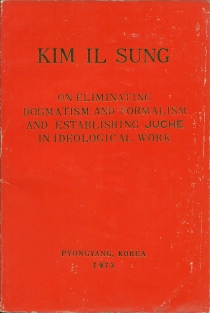
- Cover page of 1973 English edition
- Author: Kim Il Sung
- Subject: Juche
- Publisher: Foreign Languages Publishing House
- Publication place: North Korea
- English publication date: 1973
- Pages: 33
- OCLC: 51370245

On Eliminating Dogmatism and Formalism and Establishing Juche in Ideological Work (Korean: 사상사업에서 교조주의와 형식주의를 퇴치하고 주체를 확립할 데 대하여), also known as the "Juche speech", was a speech delivered on 28 December 1955 by Kim Il Sung. The address mentioned his Juche ideology by name for the first time. It is considered one of Kim's most important works and a "watershed moment" in North Korean history. Views differ if the speech used the term juche to launch an ideology or more conservatively to assert that the Korean people were the subject of the revolution. The former believes that Juche, as a distinct ideology, was developed by Hwang Jang-yop on his re-discovery of the speech. The speech was published for the first time in 1960 and in many subsequent, heavily edited revisions since.

Details on when Kim Il Sung delivered the speech and where remain unclear or have been backdated. The speech was delivered against a backdrop of factional strife within the Workers' Party of Korea (WPK) in reaction to the Korean War, de-Stalinization in the Soviet Union, the Soviet–Yugoslav thaw, and economic reconstruction. Kim criticizes Soviet Korean propaganda workers of "dogmatism" and "formalism" by citing Soviet practices they had naively adopted to Korean conditions. Most of the speech is not about Juche, but about ways to win South Koreans' hearts and minds through propaganda.

== Background ==
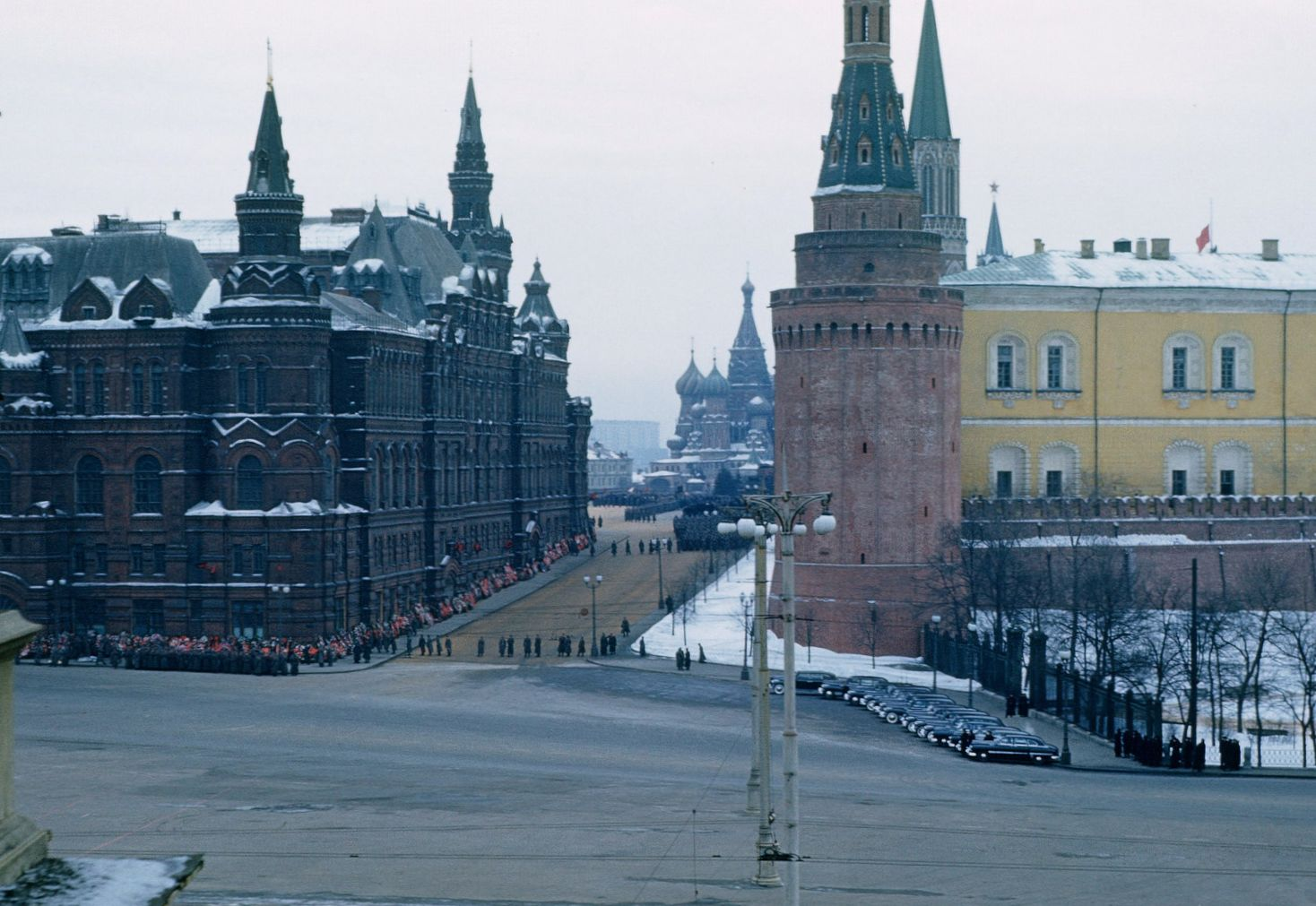
Stalin's death (funeral procession depicted) triggered de-Stalinization.

North Korea's defeat in the Korean War and the subsequent political turmoil within the WPK laid the groundwork for the speech. The death of Stalin and the ongoing de-Stalinization of the Soviet Union also had an impact. Moreover, the Soviet–Yugoslav thaw marked an opportunity to re-define North Korea's relationship with the Soviet Union and other communist countries. Kim believed North Korea had to signal its political independence from the Soviet Union since its reconstruction was based on Soviet aid. In other words, North Korea wanted Soviet aid but not the terms that came with it. For example, one Soviet condition was implementing a North Korean New Course policy to favour light industry and consumer goods over heavy industry. These terms conflicted with Kim's focus on heavy industry and the goal of turning North Korea into a self-reliant and independent economy. Kim's primary adversaries, the Soviet Koreans, were inspired by the new policies emanating from the Soviet Union. The Soviet Koreans sought to strengthen their position by aligning themselves with the Yan'an faction.

This factional struggle took place within the cultural establishment in the early 1950s. Pak Hon-yong, representing the party's domestic faction, as well as leading Soviet Koreans, appointed like-minded officials to cultural posts and discarded those sympathetic to Kim Il Sung. Prominent domestic faction writers such as Im Hwa, Kim Nam-chon, and Yi Tae-jun were thus placed under the patronage of the Soviet Koreans. Kim sought to avoid open confrontation with the Soviet Koreans since it would offend the Soviet Union. Instead, he chose to launch a campaign on the literary front against those writers. After these intermediaries were purged, Kim began focusing on the Soviet Korean opposition more generally. Their association with the purged writers disparaged the Soviet Koreans.

== Setting ==
The exact time and setting of the speech are not known, but there are two distinct possibilities. The first theory is that the speech – subtitled "Speech to Party Propagandists and Agitators, December 28, 1955" – was delivered on that date to a small audience of propaganda workers. The second possibility is that the event was a meeting of the Central Committee of the WPK that same week.

It is a possibility that the writer Han Sorya influenced Kim Il Sung to wage his campaign against propaganda workers with a Soviet Korean background. On 27 December, one day before Kim Il Sung's speech, the party convened a propaganda conference in which Han delivered the opening remarks. Although Kim's speech of the following day references some of it, the speech of Han has not been made public. However, we do know that Han criticised Soviet Korean propaganda work. Specifically, Han believed that Rodong Sinmun's editors were ignoring the role of early Korean communists in the founding of the North Korean party–state. According to Dongseo University professor B. R. Myers, Kim Il Sung's speech likely took place at a small follow-up event of propagandists. Downplaying the importance of the event in the subtitle of the speech would have served no conceivable purpose. Kim's speech credits Han for uncovering "big ideological errors" on the literary front, and promotes him to the leadership of the literary establishment.

Kookmin University professor Andrei Lankov and Korea University professor Balázs Szalontai, on the other hand, conclude that the event including Kim's speech must have been a meeting of the central committee of the party. There was an extended meeting of the Standing Committee of the WPK along with a great number of guests totalling more than 420 participants around that date. Kim's speech might have been the concluding speech of the event.

== Speech ==
=== Criticism of factionalism ===
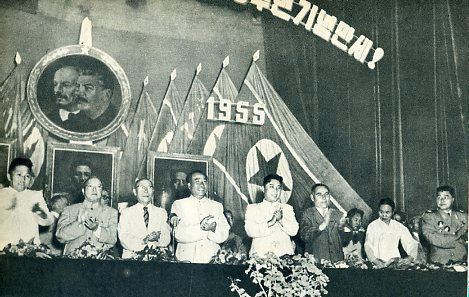
Kim Il-sung with party elites and foreign visitors in August 1955

By "dogmatism" Kim meant the rigid application of Soviet practices to Korean conditions. As such, Kim's use of the term was influenced by the Chinese communists. Likewise, "formalism" had meant an emphasis on the Soviet form of communism at the expense of the actual substance of revolution that needs to take local conditions into account. According to Suh, the speech is anti-Soviet and pro-Chinese. Kim lists Soviet practices that he finds unsuited to Korea. He believed that printing tables of contents at the back instead of the front of books, copying headlines from Pravda, publishing pictures of Siberia and hanging pictures of prominent Russian authors in public places were naive adoptions of Soviet practices. In contrast, Kim calls for adopting the Chinese rectification campaign to Korea. James F. Person calls this an attempt to abandon sadae ('serving the great') attitude (sadaejuui) and to "decolonize the Korean mind". In this sense the speech was grounded on traditional Marxist–Leninist thinking of the time, and the terms were used similarly in the Soviet Union to criticize Stalinism. However, despite the title only the speech's first half deals with juche, dogmatism, and formalism. The other half is on encouraging an uprising in South Korea.

When Kim delivered the speech his most acute concern was how to neutralise the Soviet Koreans and the Yan'an faction. Having been at first reluctant to take sides publicly, Kim felt vulnerable to critique by opponents after he had mismanaged the country's economy. To rebuild the country after the Korean War, Kim had decided on an economic policy of favoring heavy over light industry. The results were not good, with both heavy industry and agriculture in stagnation. An alternative, light industry driven policy, appeared and was associated with the Soviet Koreans. Thus, the speech specifically criticizes leading Soviet Koreans, and criticized by name Pak Hon-yong and Yi Sung-yop, domestic faction members that were purged at this point. Kim accused factionalists of wanting to bring the South Korean writer Yi Gwangsu, who had notoriously collaborated with the Japanese during World War II, to North Korea. While this plan materialized during the Korean War, it was foiled by Yi's death on his way to the North. Kim's main focus, however, was on still active officials, including Chŏng Sangjin, Pak Yong-bin, Ki Sok-bok, Chong Yul, Chon Tong-hyok, and Pak Chang-ok.

Kim faulted the propaganda workers for supporting de-Stalinization in the Soviet Union. Besides, by criticizing these workers, Kim had a convenient pretext to attack his opponents elsewhere. The speech was followed by the August Faction Incident of 1956 and a purge of opponents, which Kim legitimized through the juche concept.

=== Juche ===
The December speech is the first published mention of juche by Kim. In a speech in April that same year, he had talked about "subjective capability" but used a word other than juche. In later editions of that speech, the word has been replaced with juche (chuch'ejŏk).

Myers calls the wording of the title – "establishing juche in ideological work" – clumsy. The Korean word juche (Note: Korean: 주체; RR: juche; MR: chuch'e.) literally means 'subject', in the philosophical sense of an active subject. (Note: In philosophy, subject is the opposite of object. The "twin concepts, subject (person, mind, theorist, etc.) and object (external world), [are] central in much philosophical ... discussion[.] The central issues have been: how the subject can come to 'know' the object, and how each is constituted".) Therefore, it is not logical to say that a subject is established when it should be what establishes something in the first place. Myers offers two explanations for the choice of phrasing. First, it might have been employed by Kim Chang-man, who had talked about juche even before Kim Il Sung, and either wrote the 1955 speech or at least gave Kim Il Sung material to do so. Second, Kim might have opted for "establishing juche" as a code word to present his covert point that North Korea was moving toward more political independence instead of using a more forthright but provocative wording like "Koreanization of communism". As Myers points out, the title does not posit establishing juche as more important than the other two tasks (eliminating dogmatism and formalism). Neither does it claim that juche is an overarching ideology. Rather, Myers contend that Kim considered it as a part of the ongoing ideological work.

The key passage in the speech is:

What is the subject [juche] in our party's ideological work? What are we doing? We are engaged in Korea's revolution and not some other country's. Precisely this Korean revolution is the subject [juche] of our party's ideological work, all of which must therefore be made to serve its interests. Whether we research the history of the Communist Party of the Soviet Union, the history of the Chinese revolution, or the general principles of Marxism–Leninism, it is all in order to carry out or own revolution correctly.

While some scholars contend that the speech was a bold declaration of nationalism or political independence, Myers considers the rhetoric something not out of the ordinary in Eastern Bloc countries at the time. John Gittings goes further, questioning the passage's authenticity, saying that it "reads as if has been inserted later into the original text" of the speech. In the speech, Kim then goes back and forth:

By saying that the subject [juche] is missing from our party's ideological work, I do not mean, of course, that we did not carry out a revolution, or that our revolutionary work was carried out by some passer-by. But the subject [juche] has not been firmly established in ideological work, for which reason dogmatist and formalist errors have been made, doing much harm to our revolutionary cause.

This, concludes Myers, can be summed as: "the subject—the Korean revolution, as distinct from other revolutions—has not established itself clearly in ideological work." In a similar vein, Kim continues:

Marxism–Leninism is not a dogma. It is a guide to action and a creative theory. So only when it is applied creatively to suit the specific conditions of each country can it display its indestructible vitality.

This passage contains a specific paraphrase of Lenin and Engels that was not considered provocative back then: (Note: The reference is to Lenin's 1917 "Letters on Tactics", which in turn paraphrases Engels' 1886 letter to Friedrich Sorge: "To them [German communists] it [theory] is a credo [creed] and not a guide to action.") "Our theory is not a dogma, but a guide to action".

North Korean historiography has subsequently backdated the origin of the Juche ideology to Kim Il Sung's guerrilla days in the 1930s. In his memoir, With the Century, Kim seeks to clear up the discrepancy between the purported 1930s origin and 1955 first mention. Kim writes that his 1930s speeches only contained an "element" of the Juche idea, but that 1955 marked "the period of postwar socialist construction, when we particularly stressed the task of the sentimentalism of [juche]". Kim Sung-chull notes how Kim does not deny that 1955 was the first appearance of the word, saying that the 1992 autobiography ended the debate on the origin of juche.

=== Propaganda work ===
Purported original manuscript of the speech

Most of the speech is about ways to win the hearts and minds of South Koreans through propaganda. Much of the criticism is presented, according to Myers, in a rambling fashion, suggesting that Kim either went off script or was speaking from sparse notes. Myers notes that "[f]or what it's worth, the 1980 edition of the speech includes a photograph of what is purportedly a page from Kim's handwritten notes; they are jottings of phrases and keywords, studded with Chinese characters so as to appear more authentic". (Note: We can find an example in an earlier publication from 1970, Album: Revolutionary Activities of Comrade Kim Il Sung.) Similarly, a picture of Kim writing the speech was published, but according to Myers "there is no reason to believe the caption's claim that it was this very speech". (Note: See Kim Il Sung Biography: From Building Democratic Korea to Chullima Flight.)

The content of this part of the speech makes clear Kim's intention to destroy the South Korean state. Kim says historians should study Korean resistance movements like the Gwangju Student Independence Movement and the June 10th Movement. This largely did not happen as the focus of North Korean historiography gravitated toward studying only Kim Il Sung's exaggerated role in the liberation of Korea.

== Aftermath and significance ==
The speech was not published immediately. Some references to it were made in contemporary press, but these mentions were vague. It was, however, distributed to party members. It was not published until 1960 in the fourth volume of Kim's Selected Works (sŏnjip) in Korean. In advertisements for the volume in the magazine Kulloja, seven individual works were highlighted in chronological order and the Juche speech came last, suggesting that it was not considered that important at the time.

The term began to appear untranslated and capitalized (Juche) in English scholarly texts in the 1960s. According to Myers, this result of lazy (non-)translation made juche "jump out" from text and seem like an original idea instead of the ordinary word it was.

The speech is often considered a "watershed moment" in North Korean history. For example, University of Hawaii professor Dae-Sook Suh calls it "perhaps the most important speech" that Kim made. Conventionally, it is seen to have launched the Juche ideology. Those who disagree with this interpretation include Myers. Similarly, Alzo David-West calls Juche in 1955 merely a political slogan, not an ideology. According to David-West, the speech did not so much launch a new ideology as it espoused the return to an old one, that of national Stalinism. The "speech prioritized North Korean national interests apropos of the Stalinist policy of socialism in one country on North Korean terms." Myers points to the scarcity of material on Juche in Kim's writings until the 1960s as a sign of the ideology's insignificance. According to Suh, this can be explained by a tactical position. Kim could not press on with Juche when he still had not decisively taken sides in the Sino-Soviet split. After he started supporting China, and the Soviets retaliated, Kim could talk about Juche again. Consequentially, North Korean propagandists had to develop Juche into a full-fledged ideology. In particular, Western academics credit Hwang Jang-yop with re-discovering the 1955 speech and expanding upon its conception of Juche. Kim's first subsequent speech to elucidate on the ideological content of Juche was not until 1965. (Note: The speech was On Socialist Construction in the Democratic People's Republic of Korea and the South Korean Revolution.) According to Lankov, only this "can be seen as the first Juche speech", adding that "the 1955 statement used the word in a different meaning". Kim Jong Il, who had studied under Hwang at Kim Il Sung University, soon became the chief official ideologue of Juche and the ideology was coupled with dynastic succession.

According to Myers, the significance of the 1955 speech has only been applied retrospectively and erroneously. It did not deviate from the official Marxist–Leninist line, nor did it assert the two key features that are now commonly associated with Juche: self-reliance and nationalism. Myers thinks the speech represents a call for the creative appliance of Marxism–Leninism that was common in the Eastern Bloc at the time. David-West disagrees with Myers and thinks that Myers has reached his findings by a formalist reading of the speech (here understood as an "empirical mode of literary analysis [that] essentially takes form for content and appearance for reality").

The speech was followed up with purges and industrial programs culminating in the Chollima Movement. This leads David-West to conclude that Kim wanted to pursue rather than discard Stalinism and that the speech was a reaction to de-Stalinization. He further believed it "an emergency writ of mandamus, commanding the party and government not to abandon the autarkic economic policies and political program upon which the DPRK regime was founded in 1948."

The speech has been republished several times. According to Suh, there is only "slight editing" from the early versions, but Myers considers versions after 1960 "bowdlerized" and has identified numerous changes. The favorable mention of the Chinese rectification campaign was removed from subsequent revisions. Names of writers Pak Yon-am, Chong Ta-san, Ri Ki-yong, and Han Sorya were also omitted.

== See also ==
- Kapsan faction incident – 1967 military solstice attempt in North Korea
- On the Cult of Personality and Its Consequences – 1956 speech by Soviet leader Nikita Khrushchev
- On the Juche Idea – 1982 book by Kim Jong-il
- Propaganda in North Korea
