= On the Five-Point Policy for National Reunification =

1973 work by Kim Il-sung

On the Five-point Policy for National Reunification Speech at an Enlarged Meeting of the Political Committee of the Central Committee of the Workers' Party of Korea, 25 June 1973
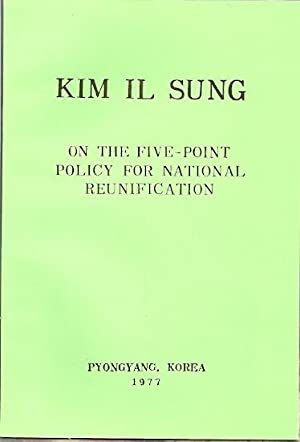
- Author: Kim Il Sung
- Subject: Korean reunification
- Publisher: Foreign Languages Publishing House
- Publication place: North Korea
- English publication date: 1977
- Pages: 10
- OCLC: 246059449

On 25 June 1973 the Speech at an Enlarged Meeting of the Political Committee of the Central Committee of the Workers' Party of Korea titled On the Five-point policy for National Reunification (Korean: 조국통일5대방침에 대하여), Kim Il Sung summarised his policy as follows:

Our five-point policy is: to remove military confrontation and lessen tensions between north and south, to realise many-sided cooperation and interchange between north and south, to convene a Great National Congress comprising representatives of people of all strata, political parties and social organisations from the north and south, to institute a north and south, to institute a north-south Confederation under the single nomenclature of Confederal Republic of Koryo, and to enter the UN under the single nomenclature–Confederal Republic of Koryo.
