= Kim Jong Un bibliography =

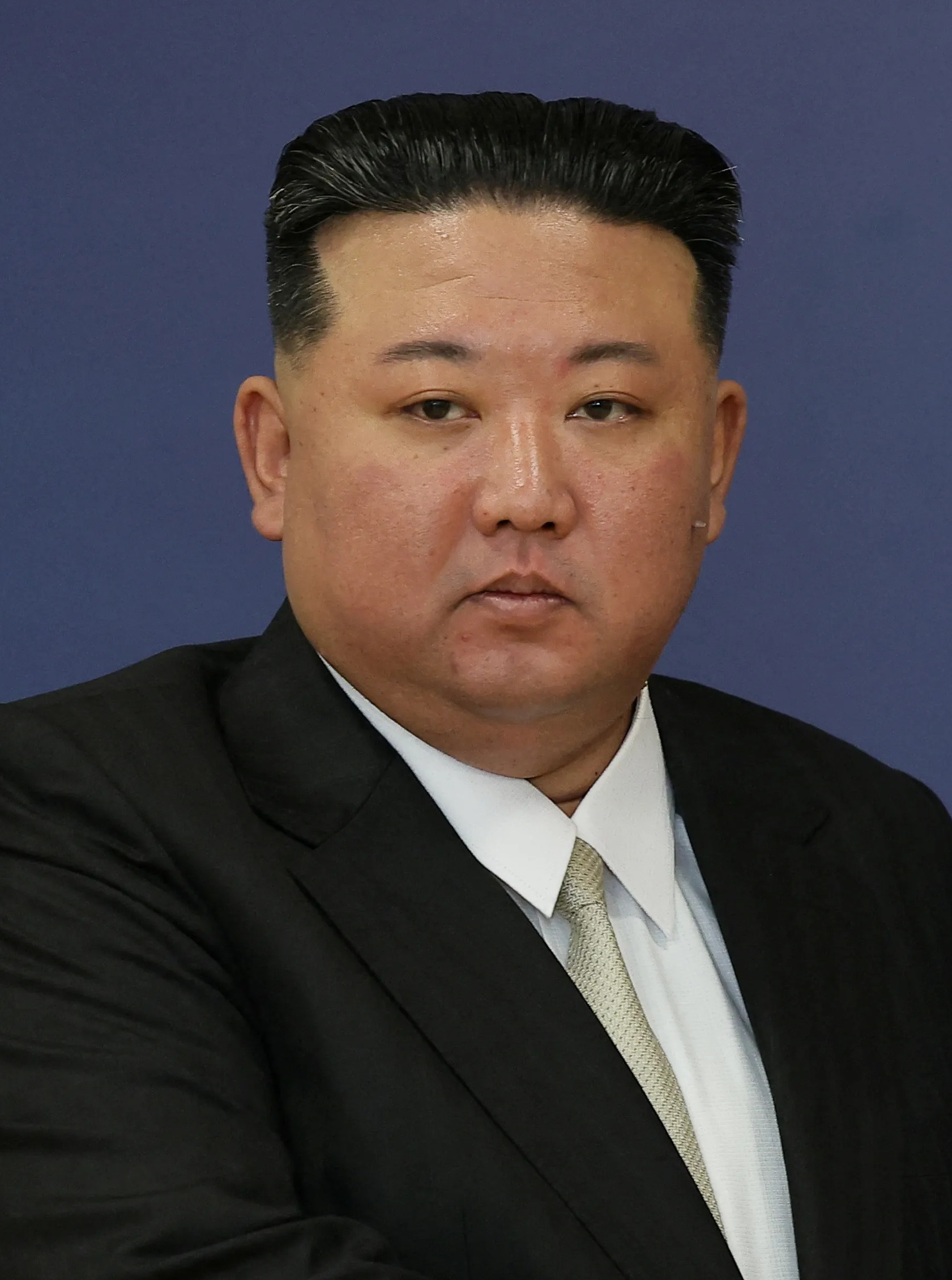
- Kim Jong Un in 2023
- Collections↙: 2
- New Year Addresses↙: 7

On 15 April 2012, the centenary of the birth of North Korea's first leader Kim Il Sung, Kim Jong Un made his first major public speech, entitled Let Us March Forward Dynamically Towards Final Victory, Holding Higher the Banner of Songun. At least two works predate this speech. To All the Service Personnel and People Who Deeply Mourned the Death of Comrade is dated 26 March. Kim published Let Us Brilliantly Accomplish the Revolutionary Cause of Juche, Holding Kim Jong Il in High Esteem as the Eternal General Secretary of Our Party shortly before the 11 April Fourth Conference of the Workers' Party of Korea (조선로동당 제4차 대표자회), which conferred on Kim Jong Il the posthumous title "Eternal General Secretary". The Great Kim Il Sung Is the Eternal Leader of Our Party and Our People, also from 2012 and probably ghostwritten, runs through the achievements of both Kim Jong Il and Kim Il Sung in a "panegyric" fashion.

Kim did not deliver a traditional New Year Address in 2012 out of respect for Kim Jong Il who had died just a short time ago. He did, however, revive the tradition the following year; Kim Jong Il never spoke in public but chose to have new year's editorials published in newspapers. In an unofficial hierarchy of speeches by the leader of North Korea, these New Year Addresses are second to only speeches made at major party events. Kim's New Year Addresses, and other works, have largely phased out mentions of the Juche ideology.

Two collections have been published: Towards Final Victory includes works from 2012, and For Building a Thriving Nation, covering the years 2013 and 2014.

In North Korea, Kim Jong Un's works are hailed as guidance and are featured in visual propaganda.

== Bibliography ==
Date	Title	Notes and Ref
26 March 2012	To All the Service Personnel and People Who Deeply Mourned the Death of Comrade Kim Jong Il 김정일장군님의 서거에 심심한 애도의 뜻을 표시하여준 전체 인민군장병들과 인민들에게 감사문	
6 April 2012	Let Us Brilliantly Accomplish the Revolutionary Cause of Juche, Holding Kim Jong Il in High Esteem as the Eternal General Secretary of Our Party 위대한 김정일동지를 우리 당의 영원한 총비서로 높이 모시고 주체혁명위업을 빛나게 완성해나가자	
15 April 2012	Let Us March Forward Dynamically Towards Final Victory, Holding Higher the Banner of Songun 선군의 기치를 더 높이 추켜들고 최후승리를 향하여 힘차게 싸워나가자	
20 April 2012	The Great Kim Il Sung Is the Eternal Leader of Our Party and Our People 위대한 김일성동지는 우리 당과 인민의 영원한 수령이시다	
27 April 2012	On Bringing About a Revolutionary Turn in Land Administration in Line With the Demands for Building a Thriving Socialist Country 사회주의강성국가건설의 요구에 맞게 국토관리사업에서 혁명적전환을 가져올데 대하여	
6 June 2012	Become Pillars Supporting a Prosperous Future Korea 앞날의 강성조선을 떠받드는 기둥이 되라	
26 July 2012	Let Us Step Up the Building of a Thriving Country by Applying Kim Jong Il's Patriotism 김정일애국주의를 구현하여 부강조국건설을 다그치자	
12 October 2012	The Sons and Daughters of Revolutionary Martyrs Should Become the Backbone of the Songun Revolution and the Reliable Heirs of the Lineage of Mangyongdae, the Lineage of Paektu 혁명가유자녀들은 만경대의 혈통, 백두의 혈통을 굳건히 이어나가는 선군혁명의 믿음직한 골간이 되여야 한다	
1 December 2012	Our Social Sciences Should Render an Active Contribution to Accomplishing the Cause of Modelling the Whole Society on Kimilsungism-Kimjongilism 우리의 사회과학은 온 사회의 김일성-김정일주의화위업수행에 적극 이바지하여야 한다	
1 January 2013	New Year Address 신년사	
29 January 2013	Address Delivered at the Fourth Conference of Cell Secretaries of the WPK 조선로동당 제4차 세포비서대회에서 하신 연설	
31 March 2013	Concluding Speech at the March 2013 Plenary Meeting of the Central Committee of the Workers' Party of Korea 조선로동당 중앙위원회 2013년 3월전원회의에서 한 결론	
31 March 2013	Report to the March 2013 Plenary Meeting of the Central Committee of the Workers' Party of Korea (조선로동당 중앙위원회 2013년 3월 전원회의에서 하신 보고)	
4 June 2013	Let Us Usher in a Fresh Heyday on All the Fronts of Socialist Construction by Creating the "Speed on Masik Pass" 마식령 속도를 창조해 사회주의건설의 모든 전선에서 새로운 전성기를 열어나가자	
25 August 2013	Let Us Add Eternal Brilliance to Comrade Kim Jong Il's Great Idea of and Achievements in the Songun Revolution 김정일동지의 위대한 선군혁명사상과 업적을 길이 빛내여나가자	
8 December 2013	Let Us Usher in a Great Golden Age of Construction by Thoroughly Applying the Party's Juche-Oriented Idea on Architecture 당의 주체적건축사상을 철저히 구현하여 건설에서 대번영기를 열어나가자	
1 January 2014	New Year Address 신년사	
6 February 2014	Let Us Bring About Innovations in Agricultural Production Under the Unfurled Banner of the Socialist Rural Theses 사회주의농촌테제의 기치를 높이 들고 농업생산에서 혁신을 일으키자	
25 February 2014	Let Us Hasten Final Victory Through a Revolutionary Ideological Offensive 혁명적인 사상공세로 최후승리를 앞당겨나가자	
25 May 2014	Let Us Usher in a New Golden Age of the Movement of Koreans in Japan True to the Intention of the Great Comrade Kim Jong Il 위대한 김정일동지의 뜻을 받들어 재일조선인운동의 새로운 전성기를 열어나가자	
18 September 2014	Young People, Be Vanguard Fighters Who Are Unfailingly Faithful to the Party's Revolutionary Cause of Songun 청년들은 당의 선군혁명위업에 끝없이 충실한 전위투사가 되자	
24 October 2014	National Heritage Conservation Is a Patriotic Undertaking for Adding Brilliance to the History and Traditions of Our Nation 민족유산보호사업은 우리 민족의 력사와 전통을 빛내이는 애국사업이다	
27 October 2014	Let Us Live and Work in the Revolutionary Spirit of Paektu, the Spirit of the Blizzards of Paektu 백두의 혁명정신, 백두의 칼바람정신으로 살며 투쟁하자	
1 January 2015	New Year Address 신년사	
28 January 2015	Let Us Expedite the Construction of the Livestock Farming Base in the Sepho Area and Bring About a Fresh Turn in Developing Animal Husbandry 세포지구 축산기지건설을 다그치며 축산업발전에서 새로운 전환을 일으키자	
26 February 2015	Let the Entire Party, the Whole Army and All the People Conduct a Vigorous Forest Restoration Campaign to Cover the Mountains of the Country With Green Woods 전당, 전군, 전민이 산림복구전투를 힘있게 벌려 조국의 산들에 푸른 숲이 우거지게 하자	
25 March 2015	Let Us Usher in a New Golden Age of Building a Sports Power in the Revolutionary Spirit of Paektu 백두의 혁명정신으로 체육강국건설에서 새로운 전성기를 열어나가자	
25 May 2015	Let Us Usher In a New Heyday of the Movement of Koreans in Japan True to the Intention of the Great Comrade Kim Jong Il 위대한 김정일동지의 뜻을 받들어 재일조선인운동의 새로운 전성기를 열어나가자	
25 July 2015	War Veterans Are Our Precious Revolutionary Forerunners Who Created the Indomitable Spirit of Defending the Country 전쟁로병들은 불굴의 조국수호정신을 창조한 귀중한 혁명선배들이다	
3 October 2015	The Paektusan Hero Youth Power Station Is a Proud and Grand Monument to Our Youth and a Symbol of Youth Power 백두산영웅청년발전소는 자랑스러운 청춘대기념비, 청년강국의 상징이다	
4 October 2015	The Cause of the Great Party of Comrades Kim Il Sung and Kim Jong Il Is Ever-Victorious 위대한 김일성, 김정일동지 당의 위업은 필승불패이다	
10 October 2015	Making Selfless, Devoted Efforts for the Good of the People Is the Mode of Existence and Source of Invincible Might of the Workers' Party of Korea 인민대중에 대한 멸사복무는 조선로동당의 존재방식이며 불패의 힘의 원천이다	
20 November 2015	Let Us Bring About a Fundamental Turn in the Three-Revolution Red Flag Movement in Line With the Demands of the Developing Revolution 혁명발전의 요구에 맞게 3대혁명붉은기쟁취운동에서 근본적인 전환을 일으키자	
1 January 2016	New Year Address 신년사	
6 May 2016; 7 May 2016	Report to the Seventh Congress of the Workers' Party of Korea on the Work of the Central Committee 조선로동당 제7차대회에서 한 중앙위원회 사업총화보고	
28 August 2016	Let Us Usher in a Golden Age of the Kimilsungist-Kimjongilist Youth Movement 김일성-김정일주의청년운동의 최전성기를 펼쳐나가자	
27 September 2016	On the Basic Tasks Facing Kim Il Sung University in the New Era of the Juche Revolution 주체혁명의 새시대 김일성종합대학의 기본임무에 대하여	
25 October 2016	On the Duties of the Working Class of Kim Il Sung and Kim Jong Il for the Times and the Tasks Facing Trade Union Organizations 김일성-김정일로동계급의 시대적임무와 직맹조직들의 과업	
17 November 2016	Let Us Further Intensify the Work of the Women's Union Under the Banner of Modelling the Whole Society on Kimilsungism-Kimjongilism 온사회의 김일성-김정일주의화의 기치따라 녀성동맹사업을 더욱 강화하자	
6 December 2016	On Improving the Role of the UAWK in Accomplishing the Juche-Oriented Socialist Cause 주체의 사회주의위업수행에서 농업근로자동맹의 역할을 높일데 대하여	
1 January 2017	New Year Address 신년사	
6 June 2017	Let KCU Members Become the True Sons and Daughters, Young Revolutionaries, of the Socialist Country 소년단원들은 사회주의조국의 참된 아들딸, 소년혁명가가 되자	
1 January 2018	New Year Address 신년사	
8 February 2018	On the Occasion of the 70th Founding Anniversary of the Korean People's Army	
1 January 2019	New Year Address 신년사	
6 March 2019	Let Us Double the Motive Force of Our Revolution through Fresh Information and Motivation Work 참신한 선전선동으로 혁명의 전진동력을 배가해나가자	
12 April 2019	On Socialist Construction and the Internal and External Policies of the Government of the Republic at the Present Stage 현 단계에서의 사회주의건설과 공화국정부의 대내외정책에 대하여	
22 August 2019	Teachers Should Fulfill Their Duty as Career Revolutionaries in Implementing the Party's Policy on Bringing About a Radical Turn in Education 교원들은 당의 교육혁명방침관철에서 직업적혁명가의 본분을 다해나가야 한다	
17 March 2020	Let Us Build a Splendid Pyongyang General Hospital to Mark the 75th Founding Anniversary of the Workers' Party of Korea 당창건 75돐을 맞으며 평양종합병원을 훌륭히 건설하자	
27 July 2020	The Exploits of the Great Victors Will Remain With Us for Ever 위대한 승리자들의 위훈은 영원불멸할것이다	
10 October 2020	Speech at the Military Parade Celebrating the 75th Anniversary of the Founding of the Workers' Party of Korea	
5 January 2021	Opening Speech at the Eighth Congress of the Workers' Party of Korea 조선로동당 제8차대회에서 한 개회사	
12 January 2021	Concluding Speech at the Eighth Congress of the Workers' Party of Korea 조선로동당 제8차대회에서 한 결론	
12 January 2021	Closing Address at the Eighth Congress of the Workers' Party of Korea 조선로동당 제8차대회에서 한 폐회사	
23 March 2021	Let Us Renovate Our Capital City Splendidly Once Again by Building 50 000 Flats (5만세대 살림집건설로 우리 수도를 다시한번 웅장하게 변모시키자)	
6 April 2021	Opening Speech at the Sixth Conference of Cell Secretaries of the Workers' Party of Korea 조선로동당 제6차 세포비서대회에서 한 개회사	
8 April 2021	On the Important Tasks for Strengthening Party Cells at Present 현시기 당세포강화에서 나서는 중요과업에 대하여	
29 April 2021	Demonstrate to the Full the Might of the Socialist Patriotic Youth League on the Historic March towards a Fresh Victory in the Revolution 혁명의 새 승리를 향한 역사적 진군에서 사회주의애국청년동맹의 위력을 힘있게 떨치라	
28 August 2021	To the Dependable Young People. Who Have Volunteered to Work in the Most Difficult and Challenging. Sectors of Socialist Construction 사회주의건설의 어렵고 힘든 전선들에 탄원진출한 미더운 청년들에게	

== See also ==
- Kim Il Sung bibliography
- Kim Jong Il bibliography
