= Suh Dae-sook =

South Korean political scientist (1931–2022)

- Hangul: 서대숙
- Hanja: 徐大肅
- RR: Seo Daesuk
- MR: Sŏ Taesuk

Suh Dae-sook (22 November 1931 – 13 September 2022) was a South Korean professor emeritus of political science and a director of the Centre for Korean Studies at the University of Hawaii.

Suh was born in what is now North Korea, and defected to the South in 1946. He worked as an interpreter during the Korean War, and left to study abroad in the United States at Texas Christian University in 1952.

He received his PhD from Columbia University in 1964 with a thesis Korean Communism and the rise of Kim. He also later worked as a researcher there. In 1989, he was a visiting professor at Seoul National University. From 1999 to 2000, he worked as the Yongjae Distinguished Professor at Yonsei University.

He was best known for the books Kim Il Sung: The North Korean Leader, published by Columbia University Press, that in the late 2010s was considered the best work on the early life of Kim Il Sung, and The Korean Communist Movement. His works have been published or translated in English, Korean, Russian, and German.

== Works ==
- Dae-Sook Suh Korean Communism and the rise of Kim Columbia University. 1964 OCLC 23152559
- Dae-Sook Suh; Chae-Jin Lee. Political Leadership in Korea Seattle:University of Washington Press, 2014. According to WorldCat, the book is in 967 libraries.
- Dae-Sook Suh; Chae-Jin Lee, eds. North Korea after Kim Il Sung Boulder, Colo: L. Rienner, 1996 ISBN 9781555877637
- Dae-Sook Suh, ed. Korean Studies: new Pacific Currents. University of Hawaii, 1994 OCLC 29846186
- Dae-Sook Suh Kim Il Sung: the North Korean Leader NY: Columbia Univ. Press, 1988/1995 ISBN 9780231065733
- Dae-Sook Suh Korean Communism 1945–1989 : a reference guide. Univ. Hawaii Press. 1981 ISBN 9780824807405
- Dae-Sook Suh New directions of domestic policy in the Democratic People's Republic of Korea. Univ. Calif., 1995 Press. 1981 ISBN 9780824807405
- Dae-Sook Suh Koreans in the Soviet Union Univ. Hawaii Press. 1987 ISBN 9780824811266
- Dae-Sook Suh The Korean Communist Movement 1918–1948. Princeton Univ. Press, 1967 OCLC 77304095
- Dae-Sook Suh Documents of Korean Communism, 1918–48 Princeton Univ. Press, 1970. Calif., 1995 Press. 1981 ISBN 9780824807405

== See also ==
- Communism in Korea
- Kim Il Sung
