= Marxist bibliography =

Marxism is a method of socioeconomic analysis that analyzes class relations and societal conflict, that uses a materialist interpretation of historical development, and a dialectical view of social transformation. Marxist methodology uses economic and sociopolitical inquiry and applies that to the critique and analysis of the development of capitalism and the role of class struggle in systemic economic change.

== Marxist bibliography ==
Year	Author	Bibliography
1908 - 1973	Salvador Allende (1908–1973)	Main pages: Salvador Allende bibliography and Category:Works by Salvador Allende
1918 - 1990	Louis Althusser (1918–1990)	Main page: Category:Works by Louis Althusser
1885 - 1977	Ernst Bloch (1885–1977)	Main page: Category:Books by Ernst Bloch
1868 - 1916	James Connolly (1868–1916)	Main article: James Connolly bibliography
1852 - 1914	Daniel De Leon (1852-1914)	Main article: Daniel De Leon § Works
1882 - 1949	Georgi Dimitrov (1882–1949)	Main pages: Georgi Dimitrov bibliography and Category:Works by Georgi Dimitrov
1820 - 1895	Friedrich Engels (1820–1895)	Main pages: Category:Books by Friedrich Engels and Category:Books by Karl Marx and Friedrich Engels See also: Marxism
1903 - 1997	Lev Gatovsky (1903 - 1997)	Main page: Lev Gatovsky See also: Economy of the Soviet Union, Planned economy, Five-year plans
1928 - 1967	Che Guevara (1928–1967)	Main page: Category:Books by Che Guevara See also: Guevarism
1854 - 1938	Karl Kautsky (1854-1938)	Main article: Karl Kautsky § Works in English Kautsky was considered the premier Marxist theoretician after the death of Marx and Engels and the 'pope of Marxism'. His intellectual work was instrumental in the Second International and Orthodox Marxism.
1912 - 1994	Kim Il Sung (1912–1994)	Main pages: Kim Il Sung bibliography and Category:Works by Kim Il Sung See also: Juche
1941 - 2011	Kim Jong Il (1941–2011)	Main pages: Kim Jong Il bibliography and Category:Works by Kim Jong Il See also: Juche
1984 -	Kim Jong Un (born 1984)	Main article: Kim Jong Un bibliography See also: Juche
1870 - 1924	Vladimir Lenin (1870–1924)	Main pages: Vladimir Lenin bibliography and Category:Works by Vladimir Lenin See also: Leninism and Marxism-Leninism Lenin was a prolific political theoretician and philosopher who wrote about the practical aspects of carrying out a proletarian revolution; he wrote pamphlets, articles, and books without a stenographer or secretary, until prevented by illness. He simultaneously corresponded with comrades, allies, and friends in Russia and worldwide. His Collected Works comprise 54 volumes, each of about 650 pages, translated into English in 45 volumes by Progress Publishers, Moscow 1960–70.
1885 - 1971	György Lukács (1885–1971)	Main page: Category:Books by György Lukács See also: Budapest School
1871 - 1919	Rosa Luxemburg (1871–1919)	Main pages: Rosa Luxemburg bibliography and Category:Works by Rosa Luxemburg See also: Luxemburgism
1893 - 1979	Mao Zedong (1893–1976)	Main page: Category:Works by Mao Zedong See also: Maoism and Marxism–Leninism–Maoism
1898 - 1979	Herbert Marcuse (1898–1979)	Main page: Category:Works by Herbert Marcuse See also: Frankfurt School and New Left
1818 - 1883	Karl Marx (1818–1883)	Main pages: Category:Books by Karl Marx and Category:Books by Karl Marx and Friedrich Engels See also: Marxism
1878 - 1953	Joseph Stalin (1878–1953)	Main page: Category:Works by Joseph Stalin
1879 - 1940	Leon Trotsky (1879–1940)	Main page: Category:Works by Leon Trotsky See also: Trotskyism
1857 - 1933	Clara Zetkin (1857–1933)	Main article: Clara Zetkin bibliography

== See also ==
- Marxists Internet Archive
