= Clara Zetkin bibliography =

Clara Zetkin (5 July 1857 – 20 June 1933) was a German Marxist theorist, activist, and advocate for women's rights. In 1911, she organized the first International Women's Day.

This is a Clara Zetkin bibliography, including writings, speeches, letters and others.

== Writings ==
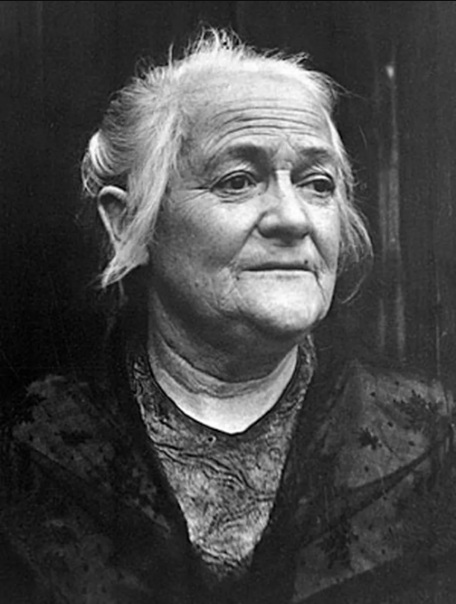
Zetkin ca. 1920.

This is a list of selected writings:

Writing	Year	Text
The Workers’ International Festival	1899	English
May Greetings from Stuttgart	1900	English
Social-Democracy & Woman Suffrage	1906	English
For Adult Suffrage	1909	English
German Socialist Women’s Movement	1909	English
A Greeting from Abroad	1913	English
August Bebel Obituary	1913	English
German Women to Their Sisters in Great Britain	1913	English
The Duty of Working Women in War-Time	1914	English
The Women of Germany to the Women of Great Britain	1915	English
Hail to the Third Socialist International!	1919	English
In Defence of Rosa Luxemburg	1919	English
Through Dictatorship to Democracy	1919	English
The Situation in Germany	1920	English
Lenin on the Women’s Question	1920	English
A May-Day Message from Germany	1920	English
Fraternal Greetings from Clara Zetkin	1920	English
The Struggle Against New Imperialistic Wars	1922	English
The Russian Revolution & the Fourth Congress of the Comintern	1922	English
From the International of Word to the International of Deed		English
World Wide Field of Activity of the Comintern		English
Fascism	1923	English
Reminiscences of Lenin	1924	English

== Speeches ==
Speech	Year	Transcript
Only in Conjunction With the Proletarian Woman Will Socialism Be Victorious	1896	English
Clara Zetkin in Moscow	1920	English
Organising Working Women	1922	English

== See also ==
- Marxist bibliography
