= Irish Socialist Federation =

- Abbreviation: ISF
- Founder: James Connolly
- Founded: March 29, 1907
- Dissolved: c. 1912
- Headquarters: New York
- Newspaper: The Harp
- Ideology: Irish Republicanism; Anti-imperialism; Socialism
- Political position: Left-wing to Far-left

The Irish Socialist Federation (ISF) was an organization which was active in the United States and was founded by James Connolly and others. It had branches in New York and Chicago. In March 1907, a céili was held to launch the organization. The aim of the party was to raise class consciousness among Irish emigrants in America. Members included James Connolly, ex-ISRP members Jack Mulray and John Lyng, Patrick L. Quinlan, and Elizabeth Gurley Flynn. It was initially aligned to the Socialist Labor Party of America, but later supported the Socialist Party of America. The official newspaper of the organization was known as 'The Harp'.

== See also ==
- Language federation
