= Rosa Luxemburg bibliography =

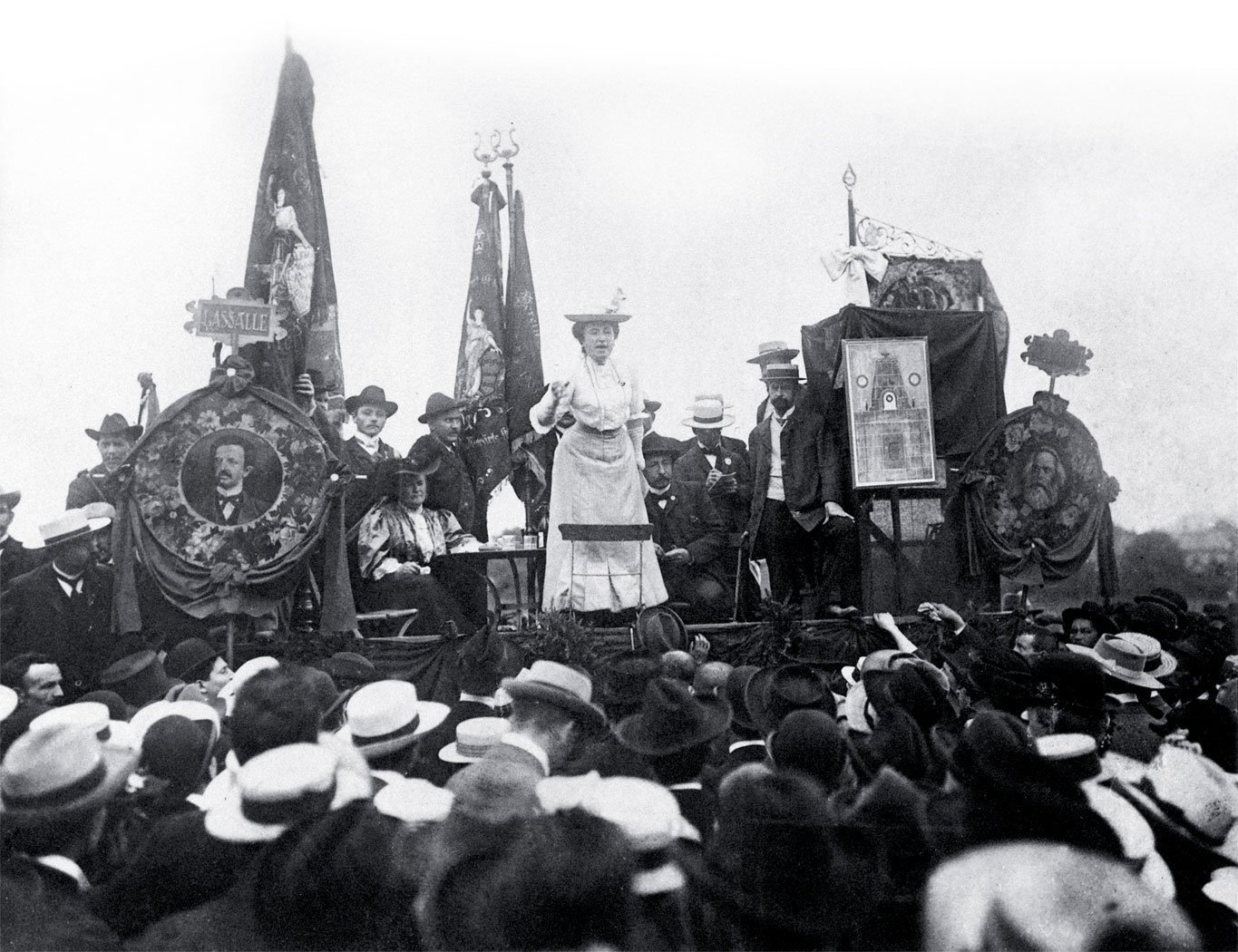
Luxemburg speaking to a crowd in 1907.

Rosa Luxemburg (5 March 1871 – 15 January 1919) was a Marxist theorist and revolutionary, whose works mainly revolve around Marxism, socialism, democracy, and capitalism. Her first major work, The Industrial Development of Poland (1897), was actually her doctoral dissertation at the University of Zurich. In it, she argued that Russian Poland had become economically integrated into the Russian Empire and that its industrial growth depended fundamentally on access to the Russian market. Although not explicitly a Marxist work, in it Luxemburg argued against Polish nationalism. Her breakthrough contribution came with Social Reform or Revolution? (1899), written as a response to Eduard Bernstein's revisionism. Here, Luxemburg defends Orthodox Marxism against gradualist reformism, arguing that Bernstein's reformist path would "paralyze completely the proletarian class struggle", resulting not in socialism but only the reform of capitalism. The text established her as one of the leading Marxist theorists.

During the early 1900s, Luxemburg increasingly focused on mass action and revolutionary strategy. The Mass Strike, the Political Party and the Trade Unions (1906) draws on her experience of the Russian Revolution of 1905. In it, she argues that mass strike was not a single, isolated act but a continuous process, a period of heightened class struggle in which the economic and political spheres were inseparable. The pamphlet was a direct challenge to the German trade union leadership, which saw the mass strike as a threat to their organizations and a recipe for "revolutionary romanticism". Her most ambitious and controversial economic work is The Accumulation of Capital (1913). She argued that capitalism, as a closed system, could not realise the surplus value it generated and was therefore dependent on a constant expansion into non-capitalist economies and social strata for its survival and accumulation.

During World War I, she published The Crisis of German Social Democracy (1915) under the pseudonym "Junius". The pamphlet later became known as the Junish Pamphlet. In it, she argued that in the age of imperialism, national wars of defence were no longer possible and that the only alternative for the proletariat was international class struggle against the war, summed up in the slogan "socialism or barbarism". This phrase marked a definitive break from revolutionary fatalism by explicitly posing socialism not as an inevitability but as an objective historical possibility. In 1918, she wrote The Russian Revolution, but was only published posthumously in 1922. She praised the overthrow of the Romanov's, but criticised the Bolsheviks from a left-wing perspective. Alongside these major texts, Luxemburg also wrote hundreds of articles, speeches, letters, and pamphlets ranging from political economy and nationalism to women's emancipation, militarism, and party tactics.

== Works ==
=== Writings ===
Original title	English title	Date	Publisher	Ref.
Die politischen Aufgaben der polnischen Arbeiterklasse	The Political Tasks of the Polish Working Class	July 1893	Sprawa Robotnicza	
Über die Entnationalisierung	On Denationalization	July 1893	Sprawa Robotnicza	
Bericht an den III. Internationalen Sozialistischen Arbeiterkongress in Zürich 1893 über den Stand und Verlauf der sozialdemokratischen Bewegung in Russisch-Polen 1889–1893	Report to the Third International Socialist Workers' Congress in Zurich in 1893 on the State and Course of the Social Democratic Novement in Russian Poland 1889–1893	August 1893	Sprawa Robotnicza	
Der Gewerkschaftskongress in Belfast	The Trade Union Congress in Belfast	September 1893	Sprawa Robotnicza	

=== Speeches ===
Speech	Year	Transcript
Speeches to Stuttgart Congress	1898	English
Speech to the Hanover Congress	1899	English
Speech to the Nuremberg Congress of the German Social Democratic Party	1908	English

== See also ==
- Marxist bibliography

== Sources ==
- Brie, Michael; Schütrumpf, Jörn (2021). Rosa Luxemburg: A Revolutionary Marxist at the Limits of Marxism. Springer International. ISBN 978-3-030-67486-1.
- Bronner, Stephen Eric (1981). Rosa Luxemburg: A Revolutionary for Our Times. London: Pluto Press. ISBN 978-0-86104-348-4.
- Clark, Katerina (2018). "Rosa Luxemburg, "The Russian Revolution"". Studies in East European Thought. 70 (2): 153–165. doi:10.1007/s11212-018-9305-5. S2CID 149814424.
- Dunayevskaya, Raya (1982). Rosa Luxemburg, Women's Liberation, and Marx's Philosophy of Revolution. Humanities Press. ISBN 978-0-391-02569-1.
- Ettinger, Elżbieta (1995) [1986]. Rosa Luxemburg: A Life. Pandora. ISBN 978-0-86358-261-5.
- Geras, Norman (1976). The Legacy of Rosa Luxemburg. New Left Books. ISBN 978-0-86091-780-9.
- Le Blanc, Paul (2019). The Living Flame: The Revolutionary Passion of Rosa Luxemburg. Haymarket Books. ISBN 978-1-64259-090-6.
- Löwy, Michael (2024). Le Blanc, Paul (ed.). Rosa Luxemburg: The Incendiary Spark. Haymarket Books. ISBN 978-1-64259-982-4.
- Mills, Dana (2020). Rosa Luxemburg. Reaktion Books. ISBN 978-1-78914-327-0.
- Nettl, J. P. (1966). Rosa Luxemburg. Vol. 1st. Oxford University Press. ISBN 978-0-19-281040-3.
- Nettl, J. P. (1966). Rosa Luxemburg. Vol. 2nd. Oxford University Press. ISBN 978-1-59740-096-1.
- Schorske, Carl E. (1955). German Social Democracy, 1905–1917: The Development of the Great Schism. Harvard University Press. ISBN 978-0-674-35125-7.
