= Salvador Allende bibliography =

Salvador Guillermo Allende Gossens (26 June 1908 – 11 September 1973) was a Chilean physician and politician, known as the first Marxist to become president of a Latin American country through open elections.

This is a Salvador Allende bibliography, including writings, speeches, letters and others.

== Speeches ==
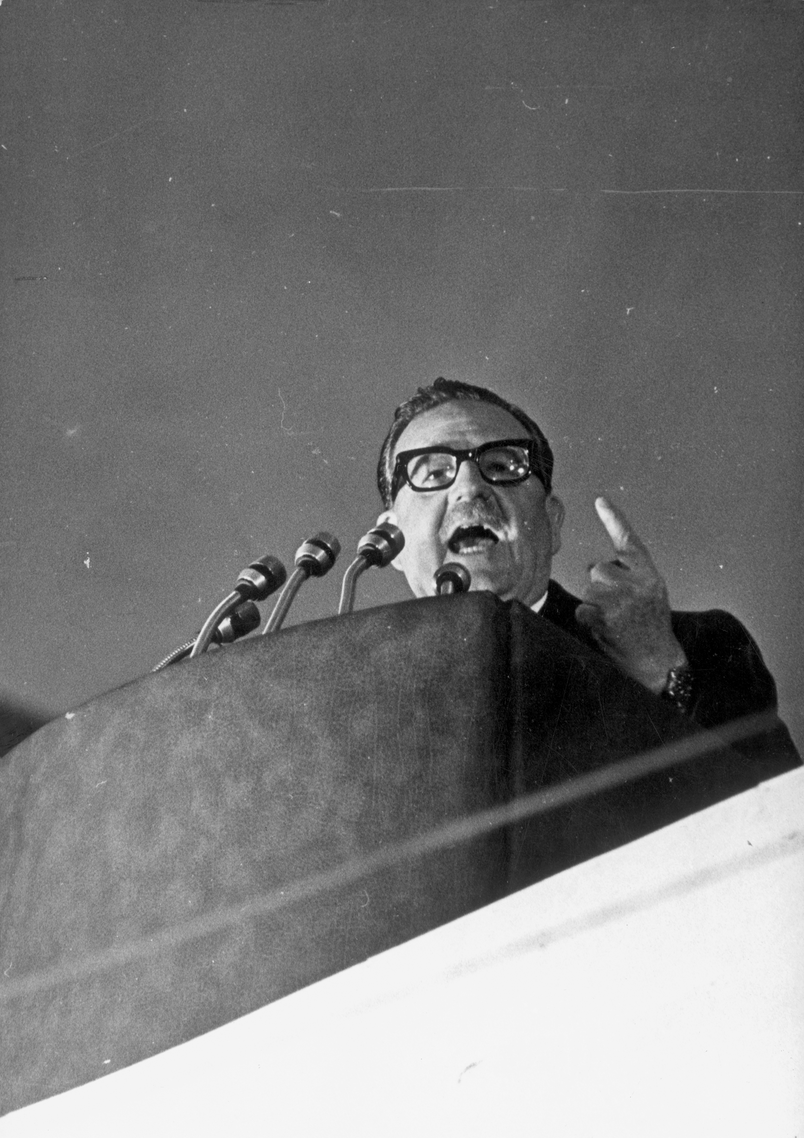
Salvador Allende in a speech, December 1971.

Speech	Date	Transcript
Speech on the nationalization of copper	11 July 1971	Spanish
Speech on the first anniversary of the Popular Victory	4 September 1971	Spanish
Speech in the FIAP-TOME textile factory	11 February 1972	Spanish
Speech in a women's meeting in Concepción municipal theatre	11 February 1972	Spanish
Speech on the XIX anniversary of CUT	14 February 1972	Spanish
Speech on the inauguration of the UNCTAD III Building	3 April 1972	Spanish
Speech on the centennial of Salvador's Hospital	7 April 1972	Spanish
Speech on the constitutive act of the organising committee of the 1975 Panamerican Games	21 April 1972	Spanish
Speech in the inauguration of the Museum of Solidarity in Quinta Normal	17 May 1972	Spanish

== See also ==
- Marxist bibliography
