= James Connolly bibliography =

This is a list of the works of James Connolly. James Connolly was an Irish socialist and rebel.

== Pamphlets ==
- Erin’s Hope – The End & The Means (1897)
- The New Evangel – Preached to Irish Toilers (1901)
- Labour in Irish History (1910)
- Religion, Labour and Nationality (1910)
- The Re-Conquest of Ireland (1915)

== Songs ==
- The Watchword of Labour (1916)
- Be Moderate

== Essays ==
- Party Politicians – Noble, Ignoble and Local (1894)
- Irish Socialist Republican Party (1896)
- Socialism and Nationalism (1897)
- Patriotism and Labour (1897)
- Socialism and Irish Nationalism (1897)
- Queen Victoria’s Diamond Jubilee (1897)
- The Fighting Race (1898)
- Home Rule Journalists and Patriotism (1898)
- The Men We Honour (1898)
- An Open Letter to Dublin Castle (1898)
- Home Thrusts (1898)
- The Roots of Modern War (1898)
- Home Thrusts (1898)
- Labour Representation (1898)
- Peasant Proprietorship and Socialism (1898)
- British and Russian Imperialism I (1898)
- Home Thrusts (1898)
- British and Russian Imperialism II (1898)
- Home Thrusts (1898)
- Regicide and Revolution (1898)
- The Irish Land Question (1898)
- The Independent and New Machinery (1898)
- Parnellism and Labour (1898)
- Home Thrusts (1898)
- A Socialist Candidate for Dublin Corporation (1898)
- Let Us Free Ireland! (1899)
- Taken Root! (1902)
- On Wages, Marriage and the Church (1904)
- Wages and other things (1904)
- Michael Davitt: A Text for a Revolutionary Lecture (1908)
- Sinn Fein, Socialism and the Nation (1909)
- A New Labour Policy (1910)

== Sources ==
- James Connolly - Marxist Internet Archive
