= 1995 in South Korea =

- Centuries: 20th; 21st
- Decades: 1970s; 1980s; 1990s; 2000s; 2010s
- See also: Other events in 1995; Years in South Korea; Timeline of Korean history 1995 in North Korea

Events from the year 1995 in South Korea.

== Incumbents ==
- President: Kim Young Sam
- Prime Minister: Lee Hong-koo until December 18, Lee Soo-sung

=== Governors ===
- Gyeonggi: Lee In-je
- Gangwon: Choi Gak-gyu
- North Chungcheong: Ju Byeong-deok
- South Chungcheong: Sim Dae-pyung
- North Jeolla: Yu Jong-geun
- South Jeolla: Heo Kyeong-man
- North Gyeongsang: Lee Eui-geun
- South Gyeongsang: Kim Hyuk-kyu
- Jeju: Shin Gu-beom

== Events ==
- Multiple municipalities are annexed into larger amalgamations.

=== March ===
- March 1 – Yonhap Television News was official start on broadcasting for 24-hours news channel.

=== April ===
- April 28 – A gas explosion in a subway construction site caused about 100 deaths in Daegu.

=== June ===
- June 27 – Local and provincial elections — the first since the May 16 coup of 1961 — showed defeat of the ruling party of Kim Young-sam.
- June 29 – The Sampoong Department Store collapse caused 502 deaths in Seoul.

=== July ===
- July 26 – Tropical Storm Janis hit near Seoul, South Korea. The storm lasted until the 28th.

=== August ===
- August 15 – The demolition of the Japanese General Government Building in Seoul began.

=== September ===
- September 5 – Kim Dae-Jung formed a new political party named National Congress for New Politics.

=== October ===
- October 27 – Former President Roh Tae-woo made a public apology about secret funds scandal.

=== November ===
- November 16 – Former President Roh Tae-woo was arrested on charges of corruption, illegal financing.

=== December ===
- December 3 – Former President Chun Doo-hwan was arrested on charges of leading bloody suppression in Coup d'état of December Twelfth, Gwangju Democratic Uprising.
- December 6 – Democratic Liberal Party was established to New Korea Party.
- December 18 – Lee Soo-sung becomes prime minister of South Korea, replacing Lee Hong-koo

== Births ==
=== January ===
- January 3 – Seolhyun, singer and actress
- January 3 – Jisoo, singer and actress
- January 5 – Kim Young-gyu, football player
- January 9 – Ha Seung-ri, actress
- January 23 – Lee Hwa-kyum, singer and actress

=== February ===
- February 6
  - Kim Dam-Min, short track speed skater
  - Jongup, singer, dancer, and actor
- February 11 – Kim Hae-Lin, figure skater
- February 15 – Go Min-si, actress, model, and director
- February 21 – Lee Tae-hwan, actor, model, and singer

=== March ===
- March 14 – Park Ji-bin, actor

=== April ===
- April 9 – Kim Da-mi, actress
- April 11 – Lee Do-hyun, actor
- April 15 – Namjoo, singer and actress
- April 17
  - Ahn Hyo-seop, actor and singer
  - Wheein, singer
- April 18 – Jo Hye-joo, actress and model

=== May ===
- May 2 – Sungjae, singer and actor
- May 8
  - Jeonghwa, singer and actress
  - Kim Hye-jun, actress

=== June ===
- June 16 – Huihyeon, singer-songwriter, rapper, and actress
- June 29 – Choi Ri, actress

=== July ===
- July 5 – Hyuk, singer and actor
- July 16 – Park Hyung-Joo, swimmer
- July 23 – Hwasa, singer-songwriter

=== August ===
- August 8 – S.Coups, rapper and singer-songwriter
- August 19 – Bona, singer and actress
- August 25 – Ong Seong-wu, singer and actor

=== September ===
- September 17 – Nam Ji-hyun, actress
- September 22 – Nayeon, singer

=== October ===
- October 4 – Jeonghan, singer
- October 13 – Jimin, singer-songwriter and dancer

=== November ===
- November 11 – Shin Seung-ho, actor and model
- November 16 – Changjo, singer-songwriter and actor
- November 27 – Yohan Hwang, singer

=== December ===
- December 18 – Lim Na-young, actress, singer, and rapper
- December 21 – Bobby, rapper and singer-songwriter
- December 30 – V, singer

== See also ==
- List of South Korean films of 1995
