= 1996 in South Korea =

- Centuries: 20th; 21st
- Decades: 1970s; 1980s; 1990s; 2000s; 2010s
- See also: Other events in 1996; Years in South Korea; Timeline of Korean history 1996 in North Korea

Events from the year 1996 in South Korea.

== Incumbents ==
- President: Kim Young-sam
- Prime Minister: Lee Soo-sung

=== Governors ===
- Gyeonggi: Lee In-je
- Gangwon: Choi Gak-gyu
- North Chungcheong: Ju Byeong-deok
- South Chungcheong: Sim Dae-pyung
- North Jeolla: Yu Jong-geun
- South Jeolla: Heo Kyeong-man
- North Gyeongsang: Lee Eui-geun
- South Gyeongsang: Kim Hyuk-kyu
- Jeju: Shin Gu-beom

== Events ==
April 23: 1996 Goseong fire

September 18: 1996 Gangneung submarine infiltration incident.

== Births ==
=== January ===
- January 16 - Jennie, singer-songwriter, rapper, and actress
- January 26 - I.M, rapper and singer-songwriter

=== February ===
- February 1 - Doyoung, singer and actor
- February 9 - Chung Ha, singer and dancer
- February 14 - Hong Kyung, actor

=== March ===
- March 2 - Kim Young-dae, actor
- March 4 - Holland, singer
- March 15 - Jinjin, singer-songwriter, rapper, and dancer

=== April ===
- April 22 - Go Youn-jung, actress and model
- April 23 - Jo Byeong-kyu, actor

=== June ===
- June 4 - Yu So-jeong, handball player
- June 15 - Hoshi, singer and dancer

=== July ===
- July 1 - Choi Mi-sun, archer
- July 10 - Moon Ga-young, actress
- July 17 - Wonwoo, singer and rapper
- July 19 - Hayoung, singer and actress

=== August ===
- August 5 - Woodz, singer-songwriter and rapper
- August 7 - Rowoon, actor and singer
- August 12 - Yujin, singer and actress
- August 19 - Yerin, singer and actress
- August 24 - Kim Hyun-jin, actor
- August 28 - Kim Se-jeong, singer and actress

=== September ===
- September 3 - Joy, singer and actress
- September 17 - Youngjae, singer-songwriter and actor
- September 23 - Lee Hi, singer-songwriter

=== October ===
- October 15 - Zelo, rapper and dancer
- October 22 - B.I, rapper, singer-songwriter, and record producer

=== November ===
- November 1
  - Jeongyeon, singer
  - Kim Min-jae, actor
- November 10 - Kim Hye-yoon, actress
- November 22 - Woozi, singer-songwriter

=== December ===
- December 10 - Kang Daniel, singer-songwriter and actor

== Deaths ==
- January 1 - Kim Wol-ha, singer (b. 1918)
- January 6 - Kim Kwang-seok, folk rock singer (b. 1964)
- October 1 - Choe Deok-geun, consular official (b. 1951/1952)
- November 2 - Kang Hyo-shil, film and stage actress (b. 1932)
- Han Hong-ki, footballer (b. 1924)

== See also ==
- List of South Korean films of 1996
- Years in Japan
- Years in North Korea
