= 2001 in South Korea =

- Centuries: 20th; 21st
- Decades: 1980s; 1990s; 2000s; 2010s; 2020s
- See also: Other events in 2001; Years in South Korea; Timeline of Korean history 2001 in North Korea

Events from the year 2001 in South Korea.

== Incumbents ==
- President: Kim Dae-jung
- Prime Minister: Lee Han-dong

=== Governors ===
- Gyeonggi: Lim Chang-yeol
- Gangwon: Kim Jin-sun
- North Chungcheong: Lee Won-jong
- South Chungcheong: Sim Dae-pyung
- North Jeolla: Yu Jong-geun
- South Jeolla: Heo Kyeong-man
- North Gyeongsang: Lee Eui-geun
- South Gyeongsang: Kim Hyuk-kyu
- Jeju: Woo Geun-min

== Events ==
- The Seongnam Central Library opens.
- February: The Korean Metal Workers' Union is founded.
- March 29: Incheon International Airport opens.
- April: First edition of the Tour de Korea.
- August 23: Hana Micron company is founded.
- September 11: Korean Air Flight 085 false alarm hijacking
- November 23: 2001 Mnet Asian Music Awards
- November 25: The National Human Rights Commission of Korea is formed.
- Date unknown:
  - Daiwon Digital Broadcasting company is launched.

== Sport ==
- 2001 FIFA Confederations Cup
- 2001 K League
- 2001 Korean FA Cup
- 2001 Korean League Cup
- 2001 South Korea national football team season

== Films ==
- List of South Korean films of 2001

== Birth ==
- January 1 - Winter, singer
- January 29 - Lee Dae-hwi, singer
- February 5 - Kim Min-ju, singer and actress
- March 12 - Kim Min-kyu, singer and actor
- March 13 - Beomgyu, singer
- April 17 - Ryujin, rapper
- June 4 - Choerry, singer
- June 5 - Lee Chaeryeong, singer
- June 13 - Sung Han-bin, singer
- August 1 - Park Sieun, singer and actress
- October 8 - Huh Yunjin, singer
- October 22 - Jo Yu-ri, singer and actress

== See also ==
- 2001 in South Korean music
