= 1999 in South Korea =

- Centuries: 20th; 21st
- Decades: 1970s; 1980s; 1990s; 2000s; 2010s
- See also: Other events in 1999; Years in South Korea; Timeline of Korean history 1999 in North Korea

Events from the year 1999 in South Korea.

== Incumbents ==
- President: Kim Dae-jung
- Prime Minister: Kim Jong-pil

=== Governors ===
- Gyeonggi: Lim Chang-yeol
- Gangwon: Kim Jin-sun
- North Chungcheong: Lee Won-jong
- South Chungcheong: Sim Dae-pyung
- North Jeolla: Yu Jong-geun
- South Jeolla: Heo Kyeong-man
- North Gyeongsang: Lee Eui-geun
- South Gyeongsang: Kim Hyuk-kyu
- Jeju: Woo Geun-min

== Events ==
- 30 January–6 February – The Asian Winter Games take place in Gangwon Province.
- 9–15 June: First Battle of Yeonpyeong
- June 30: Sealand Youth Training Center Fire
- November 27: the first Mnet Asian Music Awards
- December 1:NTN Entertainment founded, as predecessor name was Hangame Communication.
- December 22: Korean Air 8509

=== Full date unknown ===
- Korea Human Rights Foundation is established.

=== Sports ===
- 1999 World Fencing Championships
- 1999 Asian Winter Games
- 1999 K League
- 1999 Korean FA Cup

== Births ==
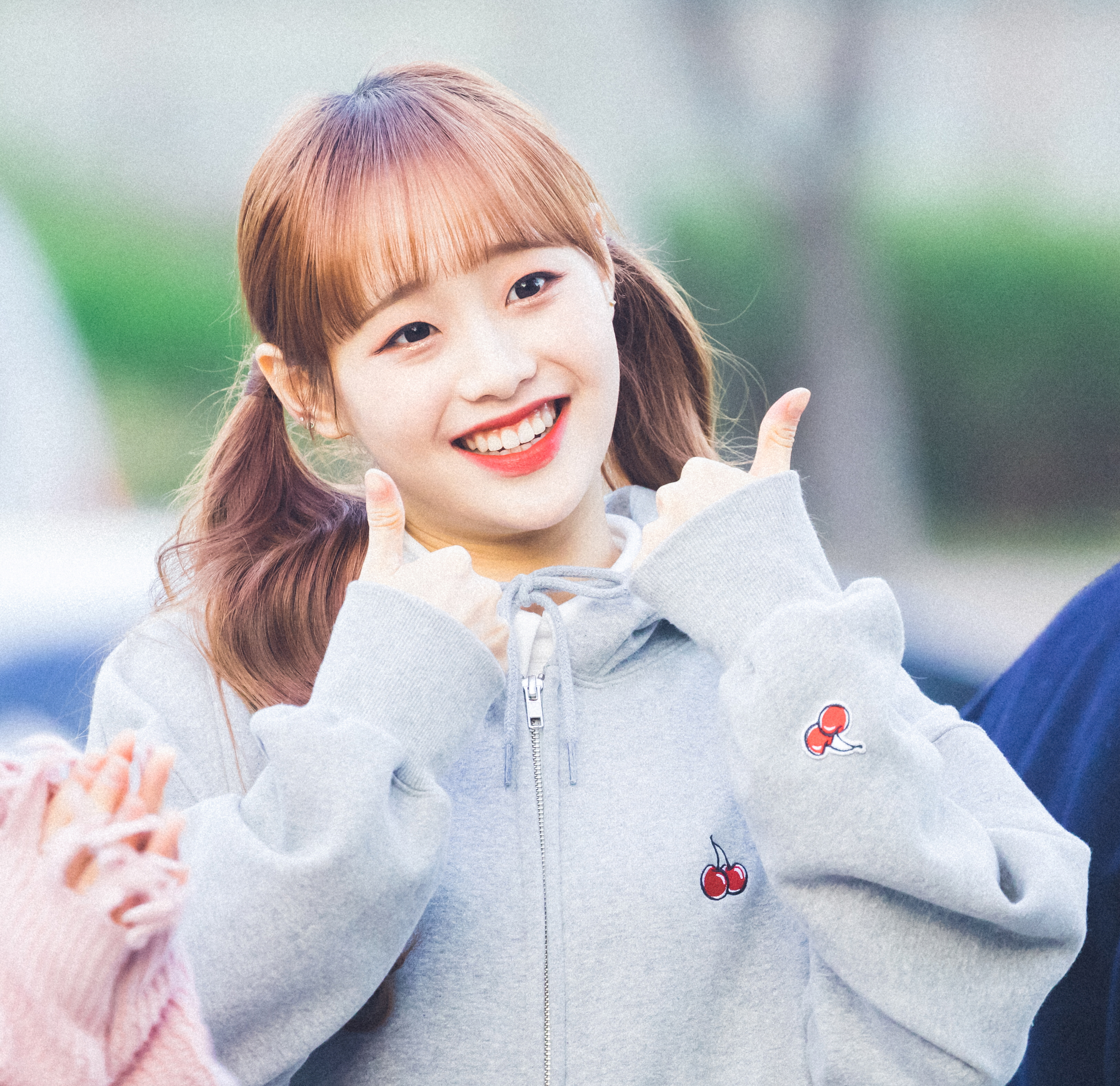
Chuu

- January 6 – Lee So-mi, professional golfer
- February 11 – Dino, member of boy group Seventeen
- March 5 – Yeri, member of girl group Red Velvet
- March 23 - Hanne Eilertsen, Norwegian snowboarder
- March 25 - Jin Ji-hee, actress
- April 21 – Choi Hyun-suk, co-leader of Treasure
- April 23 – Chaeyoung, member of girl group Twice
- May 5 – Lee Na-eun, member of girl group April
- May 29 — Park Ji-hoon, member of boy group Wanna One
- June 4 - Kim So-hyun, actress
- June 5 - Choo Young-woo, actor
- July 10 – San, South Korean singer and dancer, and member of Ateez
- July 19 - Kim So-hye, singer and actress, member of I.O.I
- August 3 - Yoo Yeon-jung, singer, member of I.O.I and WJSN
- September 13 - Yeonjun, member of boy group Tomorrow X Together
- September 22 - Kim Yoo-jung, actress
- September 29 – Choi Ye-na, soloist
- October 20 - Chuu, singer, former member of girl group Loona
- November 2 — Park Woo-jin, member of boy group Wanna One
- November 12 - Choi Yoo-jung, singer, member of I.O.I and Weki Meki
- December 4 - Kang Mi-na, singer and actress, member of I.O.I and Gugudan
- December 4 - Kim Do-yeon, singer and actress, member of I.O.I and Weki Meki

== See also ==
- 1999 in South Korean music
- List of South Korean films of 1999
- Years in Japan
- Years in North Korea
