= 1997 in South Korea =

- Centuries: 20th; 21st
- Decades: 1970s; 1980s; 1990s; 2000s; 2010s
- See also: Other events in 1997; Years in South Korea; Timeline of Korean history 1997 in North Korea

Events from the year 1997 in South Korea.

== Incumbents ==
- President: Kim Young-sam
- Prime Minister: Lee Soo-sung (until 4 March), Goh Kun (starting 4 March)

=== Governors ===
- Gyeonggi: Lee In-je
- Gangwon: Choi Gak-gyu
- North Chungcheong: Ju Byeong-deok
- South Chungcheong: Sim Dae-pyung
- North Jeolla: Yu Jong-geun
- South Jeolla: Heo Kyeong-man
- North Gyeongsang: Lee Eui-geun
- South Gyeongsang: Kim Hyuk-kyu
- Jeju: Shin Gu-beom

== Events ==
- May 10–19 – The East Asian Games are held in Pusan.
- Korean Air Flight 801.
- 1997 Asian financial crisis.

== Births ==
- January 22 – Jun, singer, rapper, and actor
- January 31 – Miyeon, singer and actress
- February 1 – Jihyo, singer
- February 14 – Jaehyun, singer and actor
- February 18 – DK, singer
- March 19 – Kwak Dong-yeon, actor
- March 20 – Kang Min-ah, actress
- March 30 – Cha Eun-woo, singer and actor
- March 31 – Ju-ne, singer and actor
- April 6 – Mingyu, singer and rapper
- April 16 – Yoon Ye-bin, basketball player
- April 25 – Seo Ji-hoon, actor
- May 26 – Jeon Ji-won, golfer
- May 30 – Eunha, singer
- August 13 – Yeo Jin-goo, actor
- September 1 – Jung Kook, singer
- October 4 – Yuju, singer-songwriter
- November 17 – Yugyeom, singer-songwriter and dancer
- December 1 – Chaeyeon, singer and actress
- December 23 – Park You-na, actress

== See also ==
- List of South Korean films of 1997
- Years in Japan
- Years in North Korea
