= 2000 in South Korea =

- Centuries: 20th; 21st
- Decades: 1980s; 1990s; 2000s; 2010s; 2020s
- See also: Other events in 2000; Years in South Korea; Timeline of Korean history 2000 in North Korea

The following lists events that happened during 2000 in South Korea.

== Incumbents ==
- President: Kim Dae-jung
- Prime Minister:
  - until 13 January: Kim Jong-pil
  - 13 January-19 May: Park Tae-joon
  - starting 22 May: Lee Han-dong

=== Governors ===
- Gyeonggi: Lim Chang-yeol
- Gangwon: Kim Jin-sun
- North Chungcheong: Lee Won-jong
- South Chungcheong: Sim Dae-pyung
- North Jeolla: Yu Jong-geun
- South Jeolla: Heo Kyeong-man
- North Gyeongsang: Lee Eui-geun
- South Gyeongsang: Kim Hyuk-kyu
- Jeju: Woo Geun-min

== Events ==
- January: The Democratic Labor Party is founded.
- February 22: OhmyNews is launched.
- April 13 South Korean legislative election
- May 27: 2000 Korean League Cup
- June 13–15: The first Inter-Korean summit
- June 15: June 15th North–South Joint Declaration
- July 15–17: The first Busan Rock Festival
- September 12 Typhoon Saomai
- November 24 Mnet Asian Music Awards

== Sport ==
- 2000 K League
- 2000 Korean FA Cup
- 2000 Korean League Cup
- 2000 CONCACAF Gold Cup

== Films ==
- List of South Korean films of 2000

== Births ==
- January 6 – Kwon Eun-bin, singer, member of K-pop group CLC
- January 7 – Kang Chan-hee, actor and singer, member of K-pop group SF9
- January 9 - Kim Ji-hoon, actor
- January 10 - Choi Da-bin, figure skater
- January 11 – Lee Chae-yeon, singer, former member of K-pop group Iz*One
- February 12 – Kim Ji-min, actress
- March 14 – Jihoon, dancer, singer, member of K-pop group Treasure
- March 21 – Yoon San-ha, singer, member of K-pop group Astro
- April 11 – Karina (South Korean singer), singer, member of K-pop group aespa
- April 23 – Jeno (singer), singer, member of K-pop group NCT
- May 2 – Ina Yoon, golfer
- May 10 – Bae Jin-young, singer, member of K-pop group CIX
- May 26 - Yeji, singer, member of K-pop group Itzy
- June 6 – Haechan, singer, member of K-pop group NCT
- June 23 – Kim Hyun-soo, actress
- July 7 - HAON, rapper
- July 21 - Lia, singer, member of K-pop group Itzy
- July 31 - Kim Sae-ron, actress (d. 2025)
- August 1 – Kim Chaewon, singer, member of K-pop group Le Sserafim
- August 9 – Kim Hyang-gi, actress
- August 13 – Jaemin, singer, member of K-pop group NCT
- September 14 – Han, rapper, singer-songwriter and record producer, member of K-pop group Stray Kids
- September 22 – Seungmin, singer, member of K-pop group Stray Kids
- October 12 – Jongho, singer and actor, member of K-pop group Ateez
- October 19 – Heejin, singer and dancer, member of K-pop group Loona
- December 12 - Kim Ju-sung, football player

== Deaths ==
- June 15 – Kim Hwan-sung, singer (NRG)
- September 27 – Oh Yun-kyu, footballer

== See also ==
- 2000 in South Korean music
