= 1998 in South Korea =

- Centuries: 20th; 21st
- Decades: 1970s; 1980s; 1990s; 2000s; 2010s
- See also: Other events in 1998; Years in South Korea; Timeline of Korean history 1998 in North Korea

Events from the year 1998 in South Korea.

== Incumbents ==
- President: Kim Young-sam (until 24 February), Kim Dae-jung (starting 24 February)
- Prime Minister: Goh Kun (until 3 March), Kim Jong-pil (starting 3 March)

=== Governors ===
- Gyeonggi: Lee In-je
- Gangwon: Choi Gak-gyu
- North Chungcheong: Ju Byeong-deok
- South Chungcheong: Sim Dae-pyung
- North Jeolla: Yu Jong-geun
- South Jeolla: Heo Kyeong-man
- North Gyeongsang: Lee Eui-geun
- South Gyeongsang: Kim Hyuk-kyu
- Jeju: Shin Gu-beom

== Events ==
- July 12: North Korean Raider incident, one frogman found dead on a beach at Donghae on South Korea's east coast.
- June 22: 1998 Sokcho submarine incident
- August 5 Korean Air Flight 8702
- August 31: 1998 North Korean missile test
- 17/18 December: 1998 Yeosu submersible incident

=== Undated ===
- Gremiphyca genus is reinvestigated by Xiao et al.
- 1998 South Korea Flood is the 3rd deadliest in South Korean history.
- Mount Kumgang Tourist Region opened for tourists.

== Births ==
- January 16 – Seungkwan, member of K-pop group Seventeen
- January 25 – Cho Gue-sung, footballer
- January 26
  - Jung Chan-woo, member of boy group iKon
  - Moonbin, member of boy group Astro (d. 2023)
- February 5 – Hyunjoo, former member of girl group April and Uni.T
- March 9 – Soojin, singer, former member of girl group (G)I-dle
- May 24 – Im Jin-hee, golfer
- May 28 – Dahyun, member of girl group Twice
- June 3 – SinB, member of girl group GFriend and Viviz
- August 10 – Jang Ye-eun, member of girl group CLC
- August 19 –Umji, member of girl group GFriend and Viviz
- August 26 – Soyeon, songwriter, record producer, singer, and rapper in girl group (G)I-dle
- October 25 - Lee Know, member of boy group Stray Kids
- November 7 – Hongjoong, rapper, singer, producer, and songwriter in boy group Ateez
- December 14 - Kim Ji-woong, actor, member of boy group Zerobaseone

== See also ==
- 1998 in South Korean music
- List of South Korean films of 1998
- Years in Japan
- Years in North Korea
