= 1998 in Korea =

1998 in Korea may refer to:

- 1998 in North Korea
- 1998 in South Korea
