= Songtan =

City in Pyeongtaek, South Korea

Coordinates: 37°05′N 127°03′E

- Hangul: 송탄
- Hanja: 松炭
- RR: Songtan
- MR: Songt'an

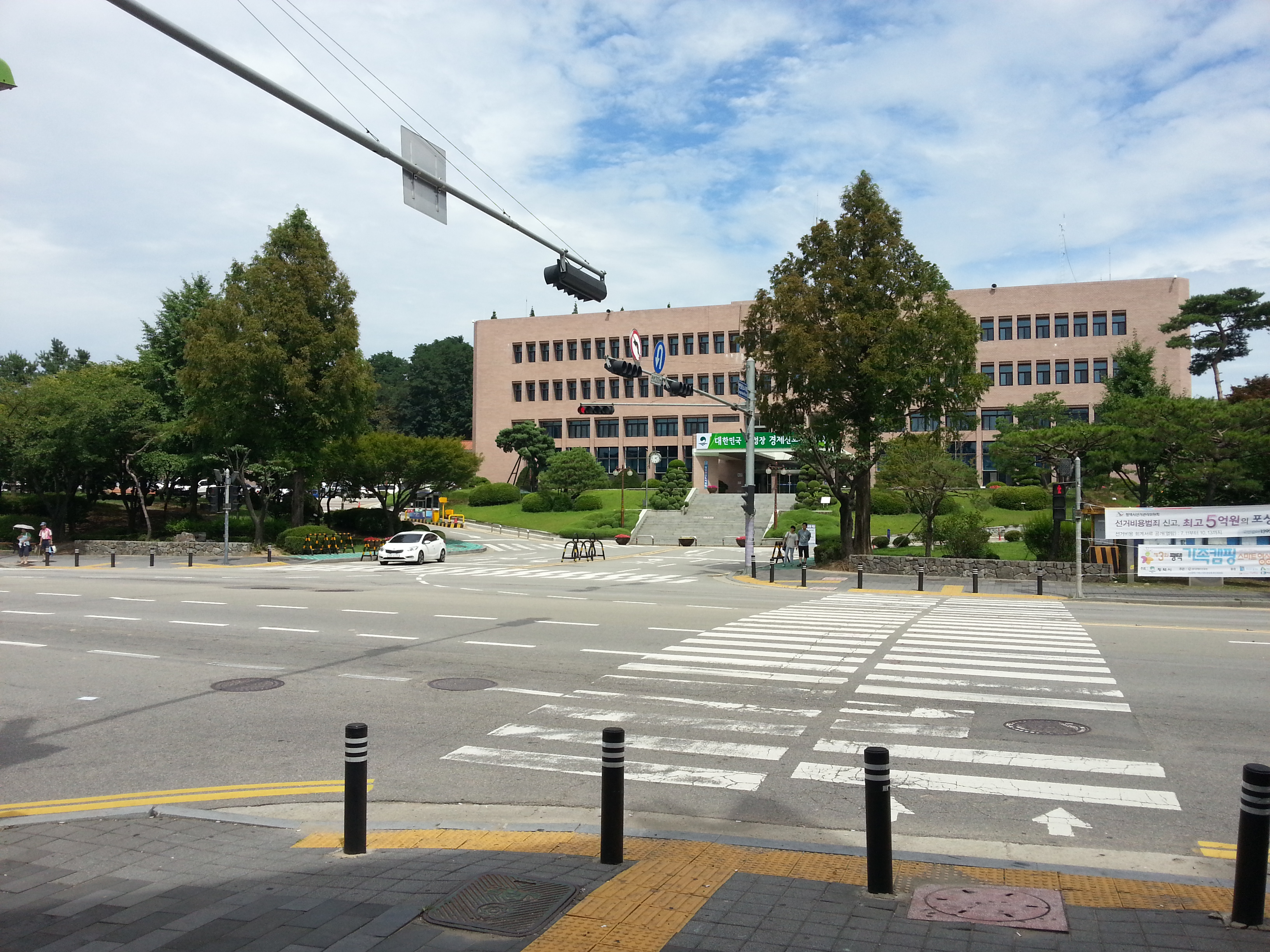
Songtan Branch Pyeongtaek City Council, formerly Songtan City Hall

Songtan is an area in the northern end of Pyeongtaek, Gyeonggido, South Korea. Songtan achieved city status in its own right in 1981, five years earlier than Pyeongtaek, but merged, along with Pyeongtaek County, into Pyeongtaek City in May 1995 (during the 1995 municipal annexation in South Korea).

Most residents still consider it to have an identity separate from the rest of Pyeongtaek City. To appease some discontent at the merger, Pyeongtaek City officials decided to keep the Songtan City Hall intact and convert it into a branch office of the Pyeongtak City Hall, where Songtan residents can still go for city provided services. At consolidation, Songtan had over 110,000 residents, slightly less than the population of pre-consolidation Pyeongtaek City.

The district has an administrative office which formerly served as Songtan City Hall. Songtan's best known feature is Osan Air Base, a United States Air Force base which spawned the growth of the area and is a major factor in the district's economy.

Songtan station and Seojeong-ri station serve Songtan, and connect it to Seoul and other cities like: Cheonan, Osan, Suwon, and Anyang via the Seoul Metropolitan Subway on Seoul Subway Line 1.

In addition to regular subway trains, Seojeong-ri station features some Korail trains and Seoul Subway Line 1 Express subway trains. Pyeongtaek station is two stops south of Seojeong-ri station on Seoul Subway Line 1 and has a larger Korail station.

== Administrative history ==
- 1914 – Songtan Township (myeon) formed as part of Jinwi County (gun)
- 1924 – Jinwi County renamed Pyeongtaek County
- 1963 – Songtan Township promoted to Songtan Town (eup)
- 1981 – Songtan Town promoted to Songtan City (shi), absorbing Seojong Township
- 1995 – Songtan City, Pyeongtaek County and Pyeongtaek City merge into Pyeongtaek City

== Osan Air Base ==
Osan Air Base is a forward deployed base of the United States Air Force. Osan City lies ten miles north of Songtan, but was the closest settlement of appreciable size when the base was built in 1951–52. Anecdotal evidence also suggests that Osan was chosen as the name because the names of nearby hamlets were difficult to pronounce (Seojong-ri was the closest town that existed at the time, two miles south). Osan hosts U.S. Air Force and Republic of Korea Air Force units.

== Outside the base ==
Songtan continues to grow southward and eastward from the base and is now a major bedroom community for Seoul and Suwon workers. Hundreds of large multi-story apartment buildings house these commuters.

Farther away from the base, Songtan appears as any other city in Gyeonggi-do, with high-rise apartments stretching to the south. Cityscape gives way to rural farmlands immediately west and about two miles east of the base. From the downtown bus station, buses run to Seoul, which is roughly 45 minutes north.

In 2005 the subway/train line from Seoul connected to Cheonan, with a station in Songtan. Songtan connects to many other cities: Osan, Suwon, and Seoul to the north; and Pyeongtaek, Cheonan, and Daejeon to the south.

There is a sizable foreign population; American military, Filipino and, before 9/11 Russian, reside in the immediate vicinity of the base with an increasing Chinese presence of small merchants.

=== Sinjang-dong Shopping Mall ===
Immediately outside the base is a district with many bars, dance clubs, small shops, relator's offices and restaurants. This area is commonly referred to by foreigners as "downtown" or "the S.E.D." but is officially known as Sinjang-dong Shopping Mall.

On weekends the streets are crowded with local residents, tourists, shoppers, military members (U.S and R.O.K.) and general partiers clogging the streets and enjoying the "festive" atmosphere. Famous for hostesses called "Juicy girls" who supply drinks to the customers, most downtown bars feature pool, darts, loud American music (mainly hip-hop, rock, and classic rock) and hookahs as the main attractions. Dart and pool leagues are somewhat popular among the military population. There is a growing music scene at bars that have local bands play on weekend nights.

Small shops are a large part of the Shinjang area. In 1996 a portion of the main street leading off Osan AB was remade into a pedestrian mall, the Shinjang Shopping Mall. Some Americans are eager to buy custom-made clothing at prices somewhat cheaper than in the U.S. from the skilled artisans who line the mall. There are also leather workers and painters, hanji, traditional Korean souvenirs, and blanket shops which cater to the Americans. Customers may haggle with the shop owners to obtain the best deal, and the shop owners are usually willing to do the same.

Some of the businesses are well-known food chains, however, most are small, individually owned shops, restaurants, and bars. Lining the middle of the pedestrian mall and streets are pojangmacha (small tents and carts) offering traditional Korean street foods such as hotteok, tteokbokki, mandu, and dakkochi (skewered chicken) better known in the area as chicken-on-a-stick. There are also small vendor tables selling colorful socks, hats, masks, tee-shirts, and other items and 'gray-market' tents selling copied DVDs.

Sinjang-dong Shopping Mall is unique from many shopping strips in Korea because of its relatively large American/foreign presence. Thus, most stores, restaurants, and establishments are bilingual (English/Korean) and many accept US dollars as well as South Korean won.

Before June 2013 Sinjang-dong Shopping Mall was known as a seedy collection of "Juicy" bars that catered exclusively to American military. It was filled with Filipina and, in smaller numbers, Russian and Korean "Juicy" girls who worked as hostesses or dancers in bars to provide company and, in some cases, sexual services to patrons in exchange for the patron buying the girl juice drinks priced 10,000 won and higher. Following a crack-down by United States Forces Korea (USFK) officials, those establishments that got out of the juicy bar business have remade themselves into dance clubs and sports bars. Some are thriving, but some have closed as the 140 bars in Songtan battle for the patronage of area servicemen.

Those that chose to remain in the Juicy bar business have been placed off limits to military personnel. The military authorities have no jurisdiction over the private businesses off base. However, they can order the service members under their jurisdiction to not do business with those who do not meet particular standards. Being put off limits can mean that a business loses nearly all of its customers, so many owners begrudgingly comply with the base's requirements. Many owners have complained that essentially this gives the US military de facto authority over the Korean businesses.

== Gallery ==
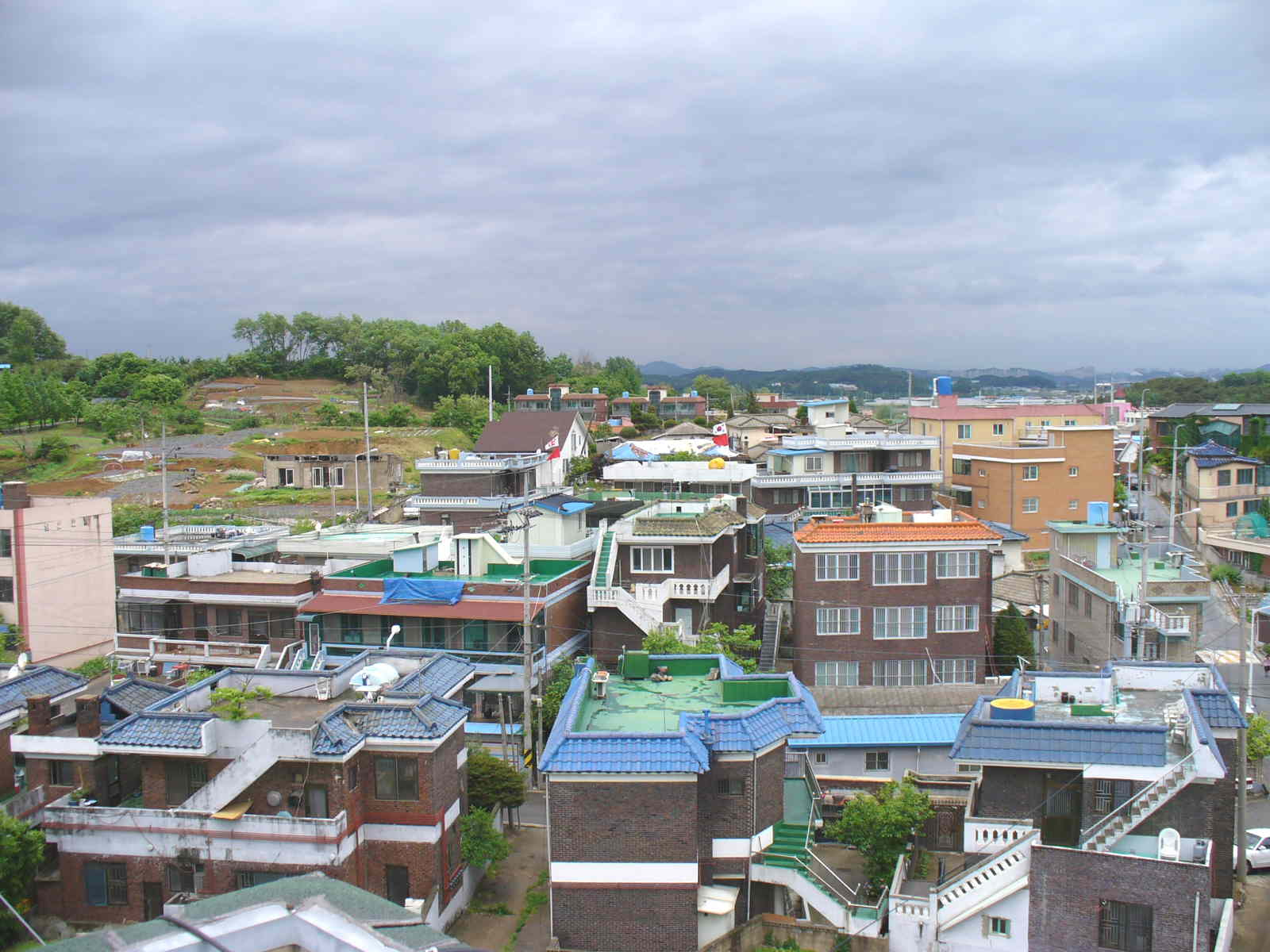
A view of one of the residential portions of Songtan

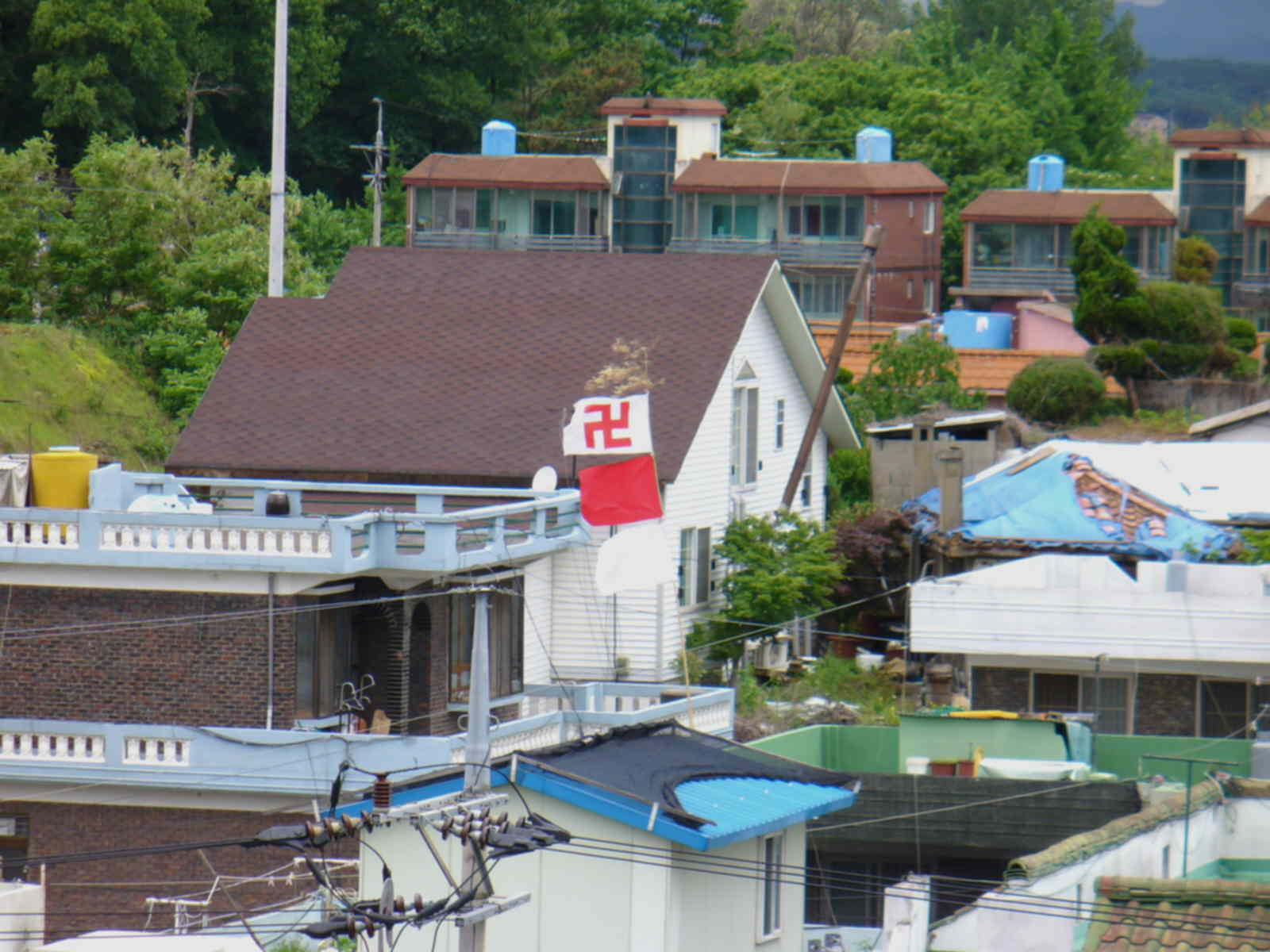
A Buddhist hall in Songtan

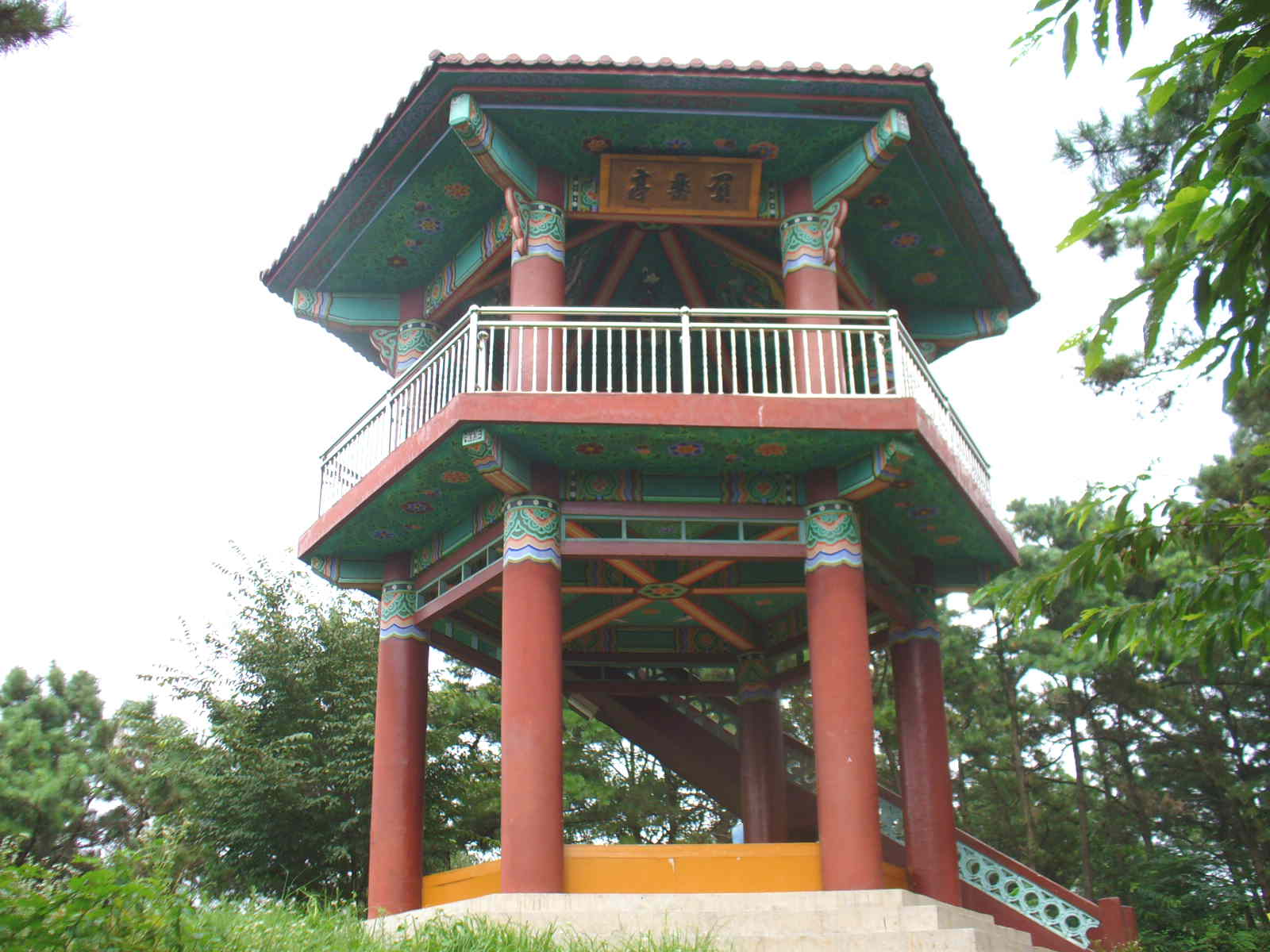
A pavilion found on the Buraksan hiking trail, a mountain on the outskirts of Songtan

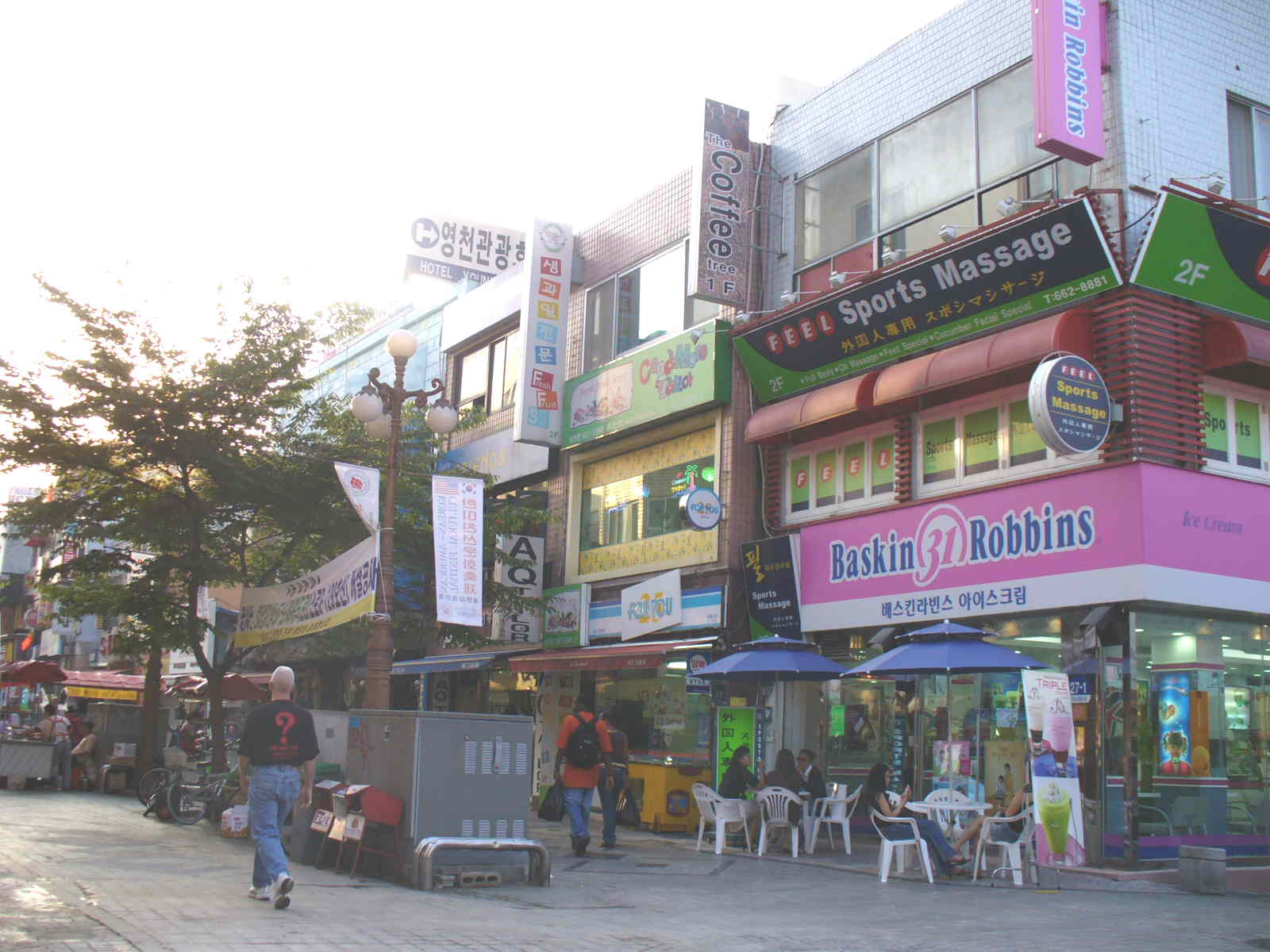
Much business in this area is done in English

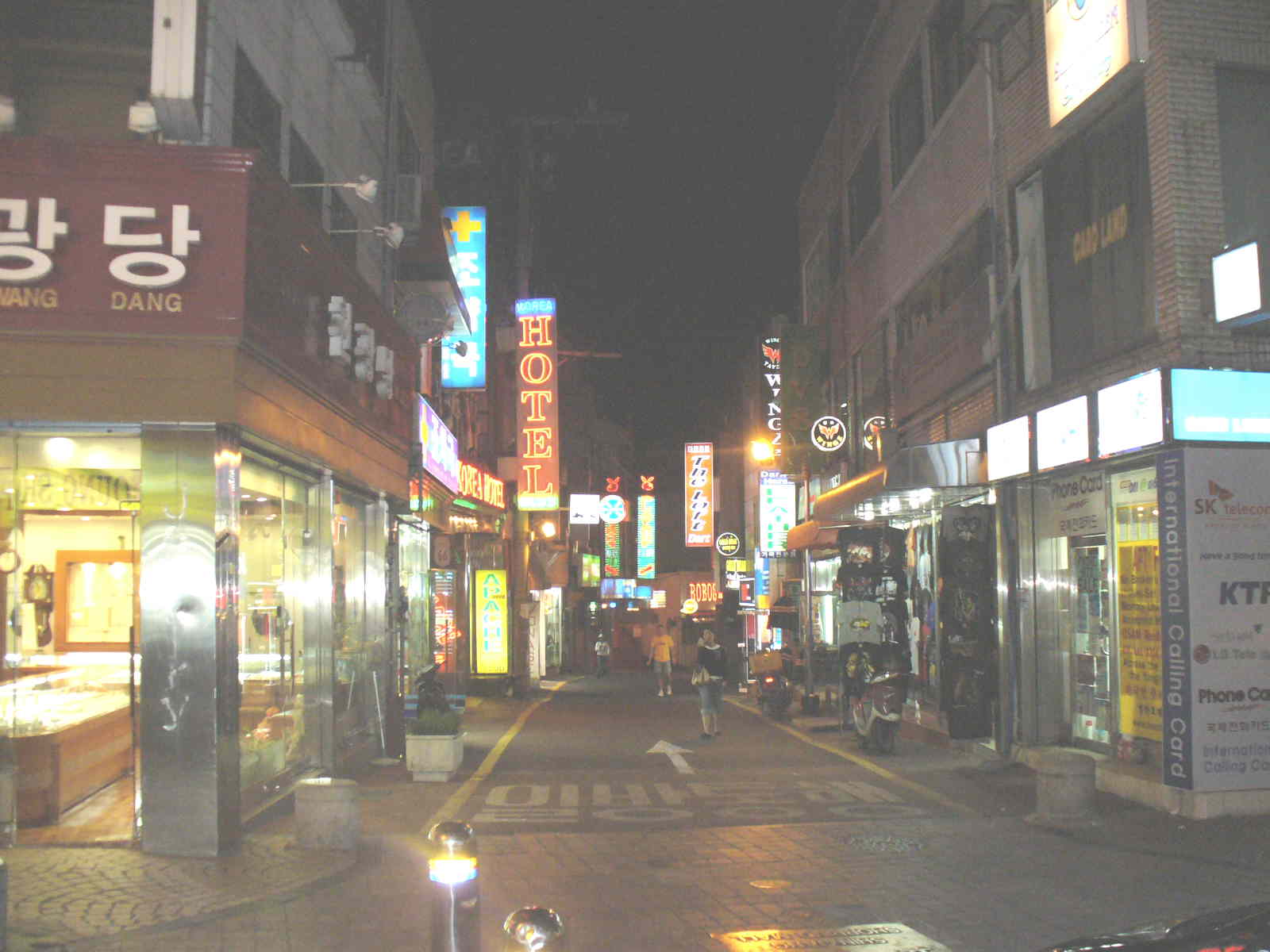
The Sinjang shopping area and bars

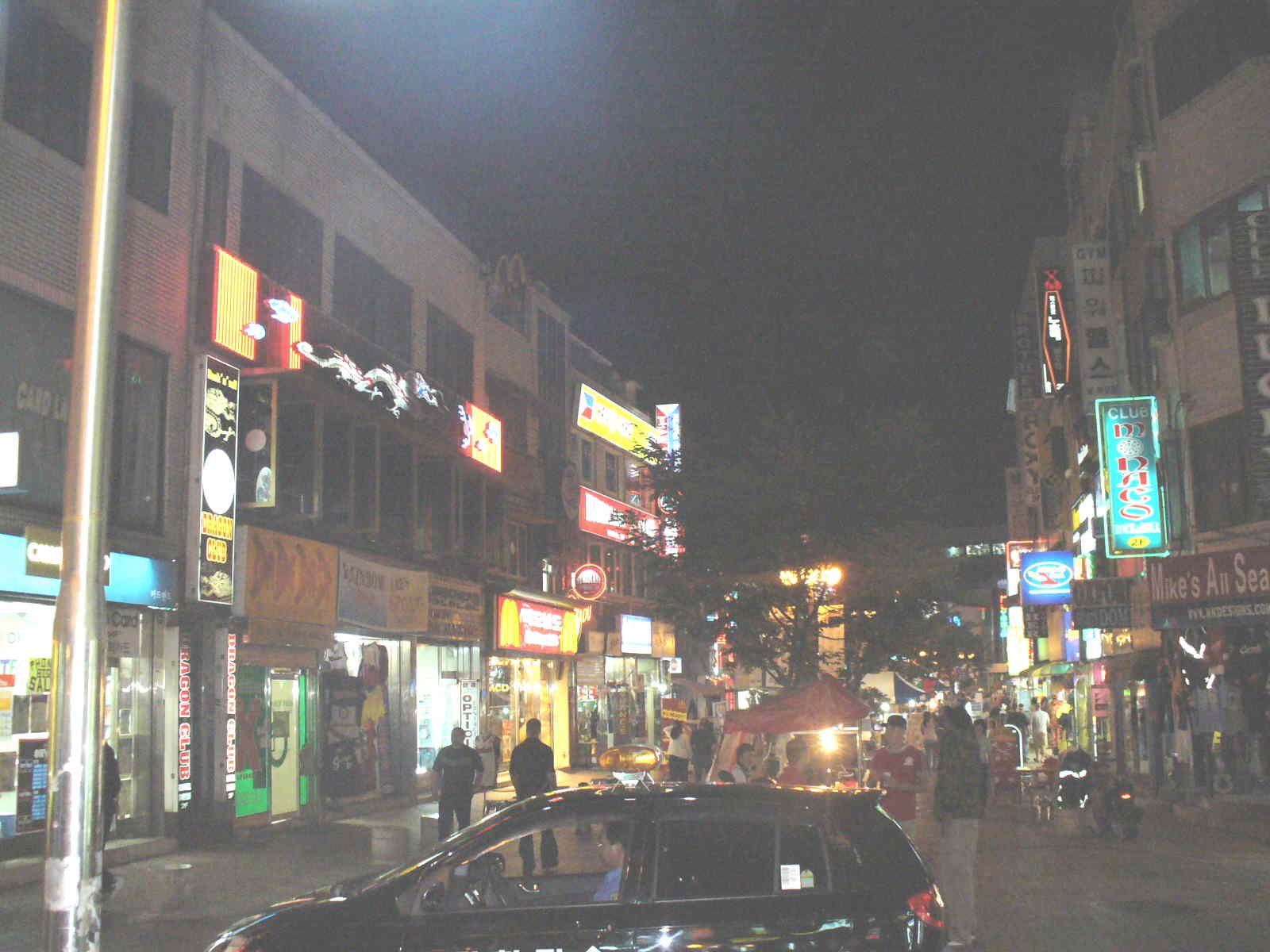
This area of Songtan is frequently referred to as the "SED" located just outside the main gate of Osan Air Base

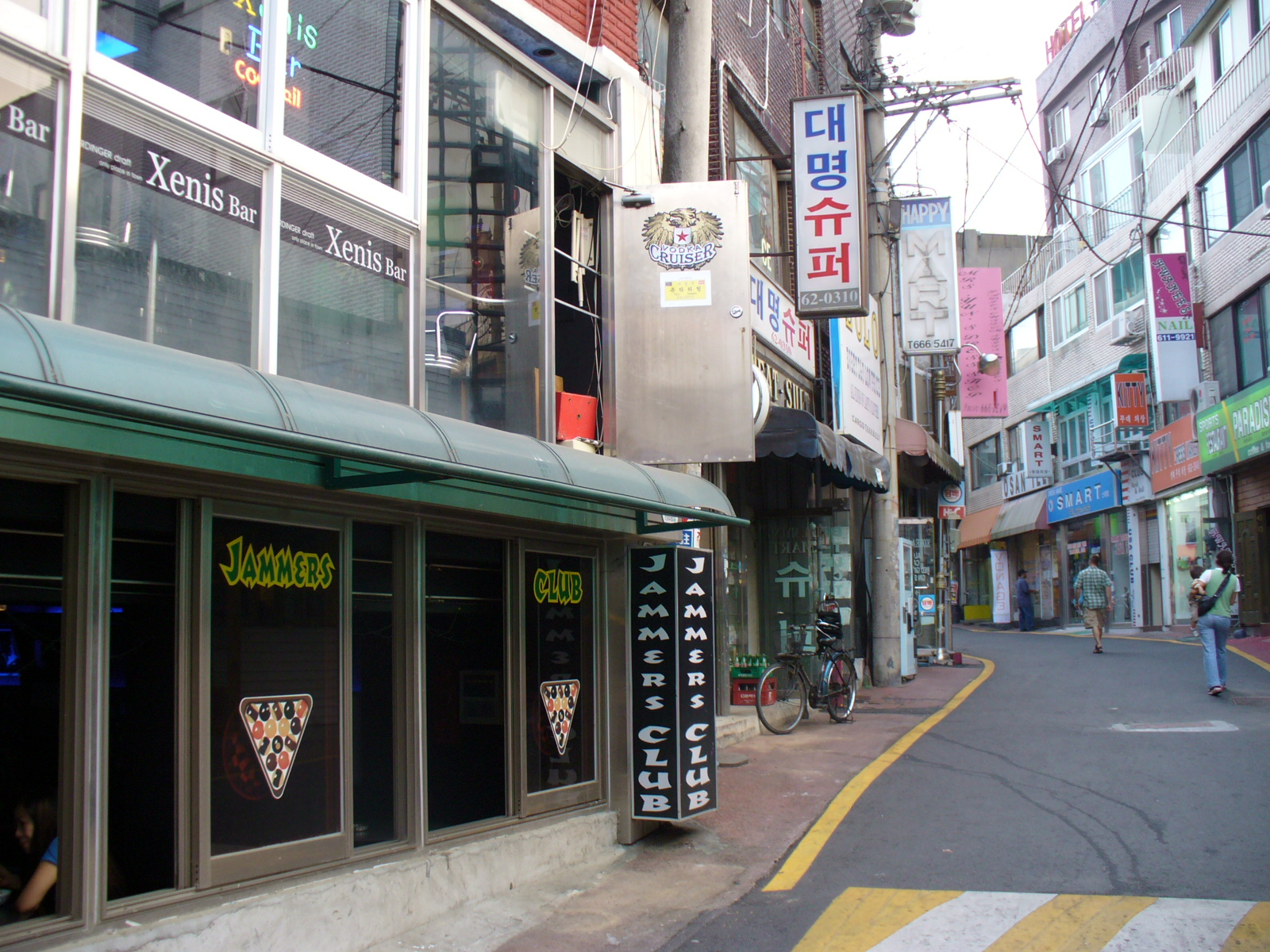
A view of "Aragon Alley" where most of the establishments are bars, note the open door on the second floor.

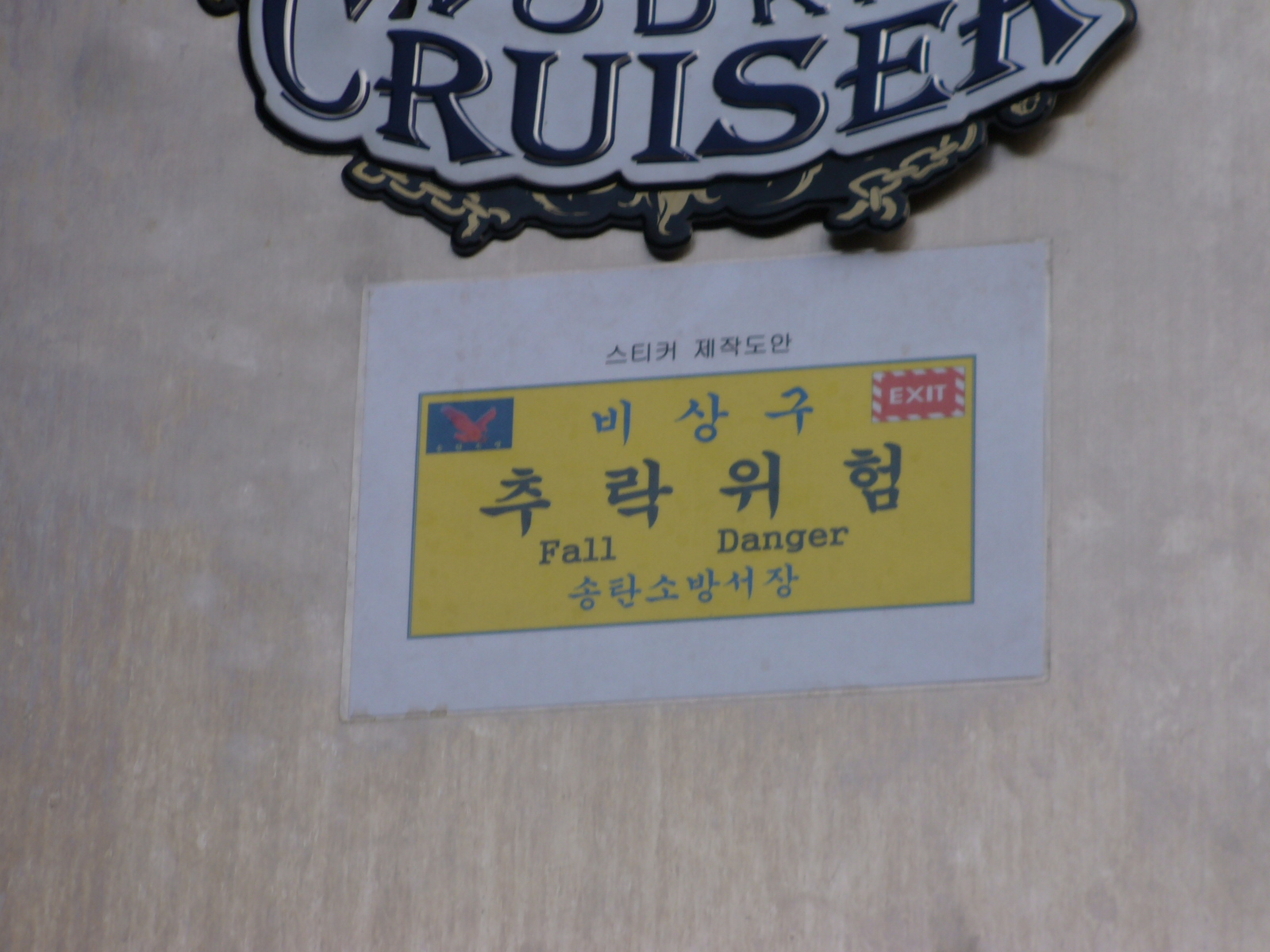
The sign on the open door on the second floor. English- "Fall Danger", translation of the Korean: "Emergency Exit, Beware of Falling, Songtan Fire Marshal"

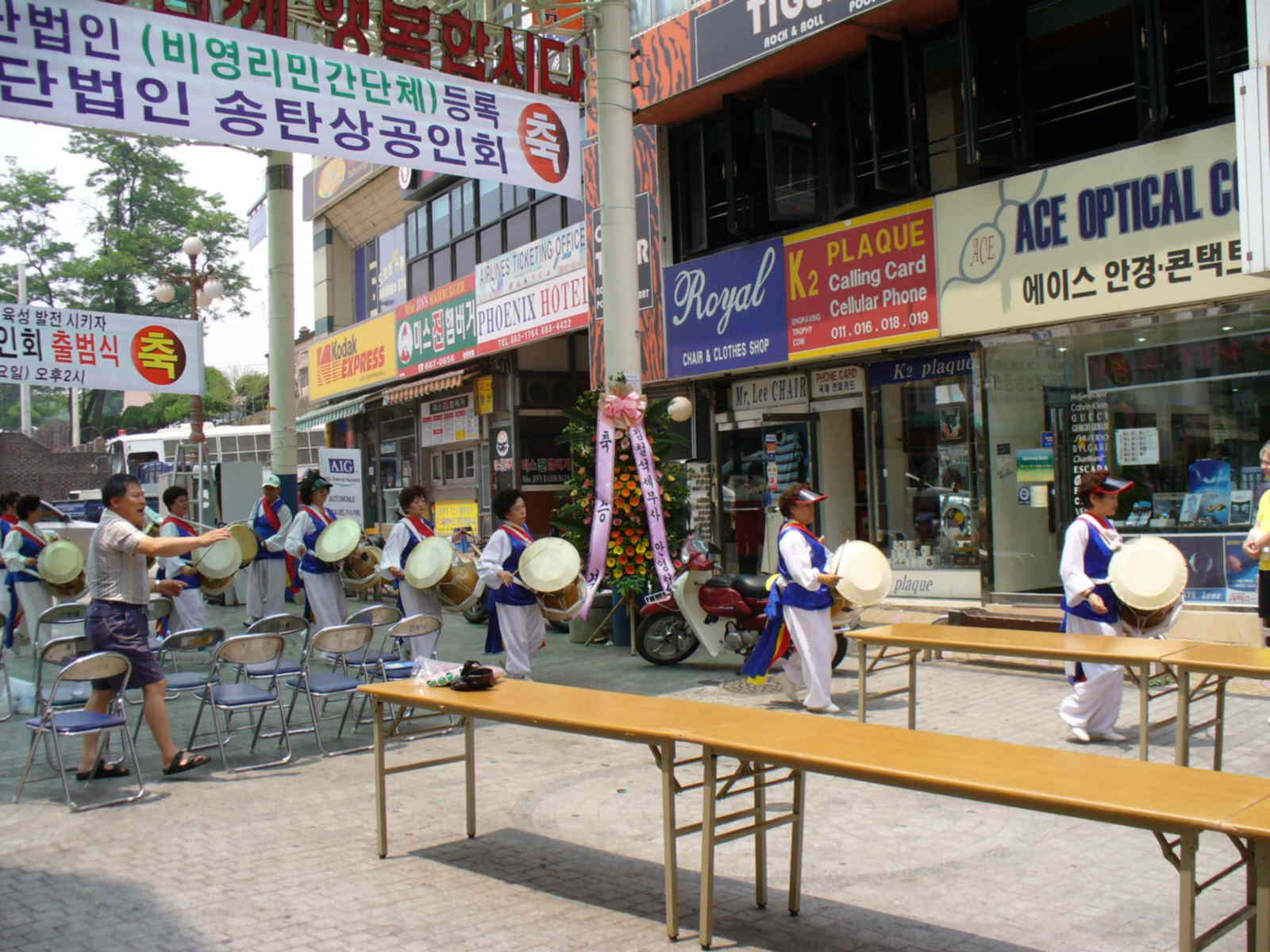
Traditional Korean music played through the streets of Songtan

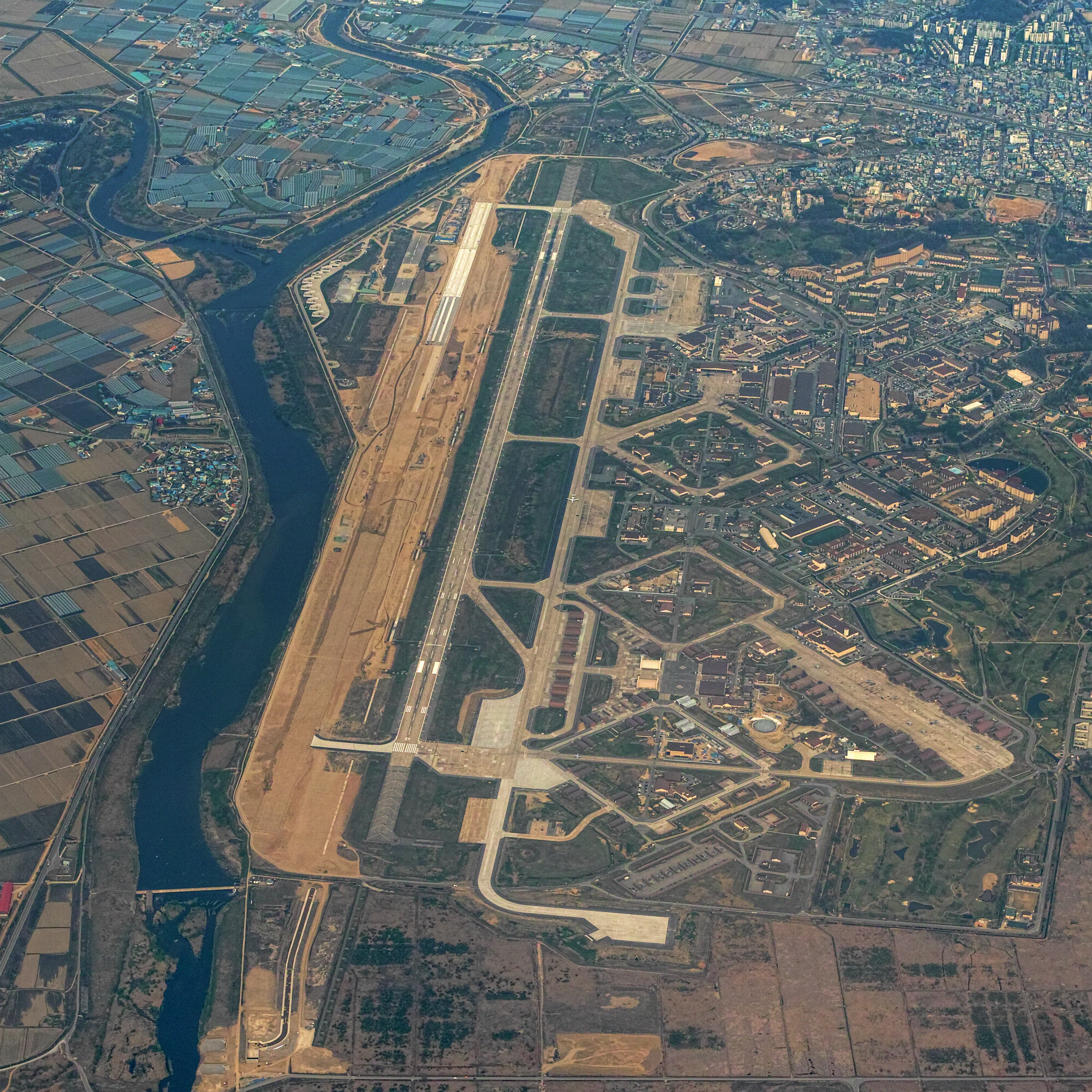
Osan air base
