= 1997 in Korea =

1997 in Korea may refer to:

- 1997 in North Korea
- 1997 in South Korea
