= List of South Korean films of 1995 =

A list of films produced in South Korea in 1995:

Title	Director	Cast	Genre	Notes
1995
301, 302	Park Chul-soo	Bang Eun-jin		
Dr. Bong	Lee Kwang-hoon	Han Suk-kyu; Kim Hye-soo		
The Eternal Empire	Park Jong-won	Ahn Sung-ki	Historical Drama	Was awarded Best Film at the Grand Bell Awards
A Hot Roof	Lee Min-yong			
Madame Aema 11	Joe Moung-hwa	Lee Da-yeon	Ero	Last episode of the longest-running South Korean film series
A Man with a Gun	Kim Ui-seok			
Millions in My Account	Kim Sang-jin			
Mom's Got a Lover	Kim Dong-bin			
Mommy, Star, and Sea Anemone	Yu Hyun-mok			
My Old Sweetheart	Shin Seung-soo			
The People in White	Bae Yong-kyun			
Runaway	Kim Sung-su	Lee Byung-hun; Kim Eun-jeong		
A Single Spark	Park Kwang-su	Hong Kyung-in		Entered into the 46th Berlin International Film Festival
Sunset into the Neon Lights	Lee Hyun-seung			
Who Drives Me Crazy	Koo Im-seo	Lee Byung-hun; Choi Jin-sil		

== See also ==
- 1995 in South Korea
