= Governor of Jeju Province =

Head of the local government of Jeju Province

- 제주특별자치도지사
- Seal of Jeju

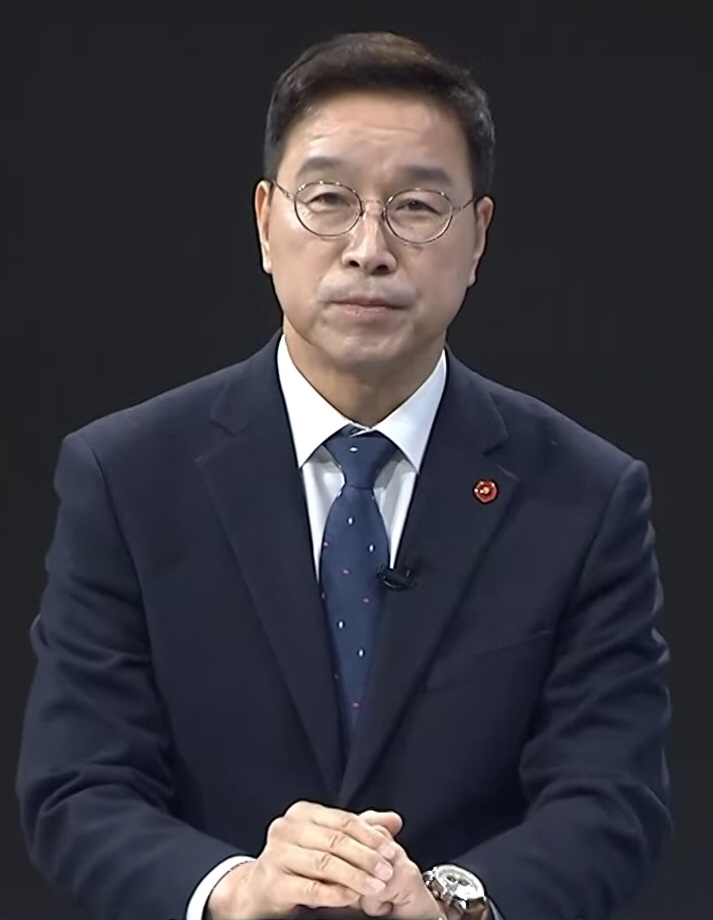
- Incumbent; Wi Seong-gon since 1 July 2026
- Term length: Four years
- Inaugural holder: Park Kyoung-hoon
- Formation: 1 August 1946; 80 years ago

The Governor of Jeju Province (Korean: 제주특별자치도지사; Hanja: 濟州特別自治道知事) is the head of the local government of Jeju Province who is elected to a four-year term.

== List of governors ==
=== Appointed governors (before 1995) ===
From 1946 to 1995, the Governor of Jeju Province was appointed by the President of the Republic of Korea.

=== Directly elected governors (1995–present) ===
Since 1995, under provisions of the revised Local Government Act, the Governor of Jeju Province is elected by direct election.

Political parties
Conservative
Liberal
Independent
Status
Denotes acting governor

Term	Portrait	Name (Birth–Death)	Term of office			Political party	Elected
Term	Portrait	Name (Birth–Death)	Took office	Left office	Time in office	Political party	Elected
Jeju Province (1995–2006)
1st		Shin Gu-beom 신구범 愼久範 (1942–2023)	1 July 1995	30 June 1998	3 years, 0 days	Independent	1995
2nd		Woo Geun-min 우근민 禹瑾敏 (born 1942)	1 July 1998	27 April 2004	5 years, 302 days	National Congress → Millennium Democratic → Uri	1998
3rd		Woo Geun-min 우근민 禹瑾敏 (born 1942)	1 July 1998	27 April 2004	5 years, 302 days	National Congress → Millennium Democratic → Uri	2002
3rd		Kwon Young-chul 권영철 權寧喆 (born 1951); Acting	28 April 2004	5 June 2004	39 days	Independent	—
3rd		Kim Tae-hwan 김태환 金泰煥 (born 1942)	6 June 2004	8 May 2006	1 year, 337 days	Grand National	2004 (by-el.)
3rd		Kim Han-wook 김한욱 金漢昱 (born 1948); Acting	8 May 2006	30 June 2006	54 days	Independent	—
Jeju Special Self-Governing Province (2006–present)
4th		Kim Tae-hwan 김태환 金泰煥 (born 1942)	1 July 2006	30 June 2010	4 years, 0 days	Independent	2006
5th		Woo Geun-min 우근민 禹瑾敏 (born 1942)	1 July 2010	30 June 2014	4 years, 0 days	Independent → Saenuri	2010
6th		Won Hee-ryong 원희룡 元喜龍 (born 1964)	1 July 2014	11 August 2021	7 years, 42 days	Saenuri → Bareun → Independent → United Future → People Power	2014
7th		Won Hee-ryong 원희룡 元喜龍 (born 1964)	1 July 2014	11 August 2021	7 years, 42 days	Saenuri → Bareun → Independent → United Future → People Power	2018
7th		Koo Man-sub 구만섭 丘萬燮 (born 1966); Acting	12 August 2021	30 June 2022	323 days	Independent	—
8th		Oh Young-hun 오영훈 吳怜勳 (born 1969)	1 July 2022	30 June 2026	4 years, 0 days	Democratic	2022
9th		Wi Seong-gon 위성곤 魏聖坤 (born 1968)	1 July 2026	Incumbent	122 days	Democratic	2026

== Elections ==
=== 1995 ===
1995 Jeju gubernatorial election
Party	#	Candidate	Votes	Percentage
Independent	3	Shin Gu-beom	111,205	40.64%
Democratic Liberal	1	Woo Geun-min	89,000	32.53%
Democratic	2	Kang Bo-sung	66,406	24.27%
Independent	4	Shin Doo-wan	6,961	2.54%
Total			273,572	100.00%
Voter turnout			80.47%	

=== 1998 ===
1998 Jeju gubernatorial election
Party	#	Candidate	Votes	Percentage
National Congress	2	Woo Geun-min	139,695	52.76%
Independent	4	Shin Gu-beom	81,491	30.78%
Grand National	1	Hyun Im-jong	43,559	16.45%
Total			264,745	100.00%
Voter turnout			73.70%	

=== 2002 ===
2002 Jeju gubernatorial election
Party	#	Candidate	Votes	Percentage
Millennium Democratic	2	Woo Geun-min	135,283	51.40%
Grand National	1	Shin Gu-beom	119,502	45.41%
Democratic People's	3	Shin Doo-wan	8,373	3.18%
Total			263,158	100.00%
Voter turnout			68.94%	

=== 2004 (by-election) ===
2004 Jeju gubernatorial by-election
Party	#	Candidate	Votes	Percentage
Grand National	2	Kim Tae-hwan	108,853	56.00%
Uri	1	Jin Chul-hoon	85,542	44.00%
Total			194,395	100.00%
Voter turnout			49.80%	

=== 2006 ===
2006 Jeju gubernatorial election
Party	#	Candidate	Votes	Percentage
Independent	6	Kim Tae-hwan	117,244	42.73%
Grand National	2	Hyun Myung-gwan	112,774	41.10%
Uri	1	Jin Chul-hoon	44,334	16.15%
Total			274,352	100.00%
Voter turnout			67.26%	

=== 2010 ===
2010 Jeju gubernatorial election
Party	#	Candidate	Votes	Percentage
Independent	9	Woo Geun-min	110,603	41.40%
Independent	8	Hyun Myung-gwan	108,344	40.55%
Democratic	2	Goh Hee-bum	48,186	18.03%
Total			267,133	100.00%
Voter turnout			65.09%	

=== 2014 ===
2014 Jeju gubernatorial election
Party	#	Candidate	Votes	Percentage
Saenuri	1	Won Hee-ryong	172,793	59.97%
NPAD	2	Shin Gu-beom	99,493	34.53%
Unified Progressive	3	Goh Seung-wan	12,209	4.23%
New Politics	4	Joo Jong-geun	3,637	1.26%
Total			288,132	100.00%
Voter turnout			62.79%	

=== 2018 ===
2018 Jeju gubernatorial election
Party	#	Candidate	Votes	Percentage
Independent	7	Won Hee-ryong	178,255	51.72%
Democratic	1	Moon Dae-rim	137,901	40.01%
Green	6	Ko Eun-young	12,188	3.53%
Liberty Korea	2	Kim Bang-hoon	11,241	3.26%
Bareunmirae	3	Jang Seong-cheol	5,019	1.45%
Total			344,604	100.00%
Voter turnout			65.90%	

=== 2022 ===
2022 Jeju gubernatorial election
Party	#	Candidate	Votes	Percentage
Democratic	1	Oh Young-hun	163,116	55.14%
People Power	2	Heo Hyang-jin	116,786	39.48%
Independent	5	Park Chan-shik	10,138	3.42%
Green	4	Bu Soon-jeong	5,750	1.94%
Total			295,790	100.00%
Voter turnout			53.11%	

=== 2026 ===
Candidate	Party	Votes	%
Wi Seong-gon	Democratic Party	197,897	63.11
Moon Sung-yu	People Power Party	105,251	33.57
Yang Yoon-nyong	Independent	10,416	3.32
Total		313,564	100.00
Valid votes		313,564	98.30
Invalid/blank votes		5,428	1.70
Total votes		318,992	100.00
Registered voters/turnout		565,350	56.42
Democratic hold			

== See also ==
- Government of South Korea
- Politics of South Korea
