= Daewon Media =

South Korean media company

- Company type: Public
- Traded as: KRX: 048910
- Genre: Comics, animation, video games
- Founded: 1973; 53 years ago
- Headquarters: Seoul, South Korea
- Key people: Jung Wook (chair, co-CEO); Ahn Hyeon-dong (president, co-CEO)
- Number of employees: 200
- Divisions: Daewon C.I.; Haksan Publishing; Daewon Broadcasting; Daewon DST; Daewon Game; Bandai Namco Korea; Daewon Charactery
- Website: DaewonMedia.com

Daewon Media (Korean: 대원미디어; RR: Daewon Midieo), formerly Daiwon C&A Holdings, is a South Korean company specializing in character and animation-related business. Founded in 1973, Daewon's subsidiaries include Daewon C.I., Haksan Publishing, and Daewon Broadcasting; it is involved in comic publishing, animation production, video gaming, character licensing, TV animation broadcasting, and animation importing/exporting. Its current chair and co-CEO is Jung Wook and its president and co-CEO is Ahn Hyeon-dong.

== History ==
Daewon Media was founded in 1973 in South Korea as "One Production", and in 1974 the name was changed to "Daiwon Productions". In 1977, Daiwon Animation Ltd was formed, and the company entered into an OEM agreement with Japan's Toei Animation to provide technical assistance work on its animation productions. That year, Daewon providing assistance on around 80 titles, including Galaxy Express 999 and Candy Candy. Daewon moved into the area of domestic animation production, and in 1982 released ten theatrical animated films. In 1985 and 1986, Daiwon signed OEM agreements with several United States animation companies, including Hanna-Barbera. Daewon produced an animated series Run, Hodori for the Munhwa Broadcasting Corporation to promote the 1988 Summer Olympics and in 1987, the created the first-ever domestic television animation, Wandering Gatchi for the Korean Broadcasting System along with 13 other series. In 1989, Daewon established its Character Business Division for licensing of foreign properties for domestic release.

In 1991, Daewon expanded into comics publishing and distribution and founded "Daiwon C.I." for publication of domestic and imported comics magazines and book imprints. Also that year, Daewon began importing of foreign films. In 1993, one of Daewon's domestic animated film productions, The Earth is a Green Planet, won a bronze medal at the New York Film Festival, and in 1995 won the Gold Prize at the Korean Film & Animation Awards for its animated film, Red Hawk. Daewon produced South Korea's first television SFX animation, Vectormen, Warrior of the Earth, in 1997. During this time, Daewon entered OEM agreements with Asahi Production of Japan and other international companies.

The company changed its name to Daiwon C&A Holdings in 2000. In 2001, Daewon registered on the KOSDAQ stock market, and later that year, the Daewon Digital Broadcasting and Anione TV, an animation television channel, were launched, with funding from several Japanese investors. In 2003, Daewon licensed the rights for television and comic distribution of One Piece and Yu-Gi-Oh! from TV Tokyo and Toei Animation respectively. Also that year, Daewon joined South Korean animation studio Character Plan and Japan's OLM in production of a theatrical animated adaptation of the Korean comic Blade of the Phantom Master. The film, released in 2004, became the first animated film jointly produced by the two countries, and has since been translated and distributed in several countries, including the United States. Later in 2003, Daewon signed an agreement with Nintendo to distribute localized versions of its gaming system hardware and software, leading to the founding of Game Champ as a subsidiary company.

In 2004, Daewon signed an export agreement with Bandai of Japan for its Yu-Gi-Oh! Trading Card Game and with Manga Entertainment of the United States for its domestic production Eon Kid. The next year, the company signed a memorandum of understanding with Konami of Japan for the Yu-Gi-Oh! online game. Daewon and CJ Media formed a joint venture, Champ Vision, Inc. to launched another cable channel, Champ, on May 2, 2005, while signing an agreement to host a Jetix block on the channel. In 2006, Daewon won the top prize at the Ministry of Information and Communication's Digital Content Awards for its TV animation, Donggle Donggle Jjak Jjak.

=== Daewon Media ===
The company's name was changed in 2007 to Daewon Media, and Kids' WB broadcast two of Daewon's domestic productions, Eon Kid and Magi-Nation on American television. In 2008, Daewon announced it has secured the worldwide rights to create and distribute an animated TV series of the Japanese comic Gon. In 2009, Daewon announced the launch of its new preschool animation Noonbory and the Super 7 through EBS channel in Korea and CBS Kids block in the US.

== Products and services ==
=== Publishing ===
Daewon C.I. (Daewon Culture & Industry), founded in 1991, publishes domestic and imported comics. It also releases the Korean version of Newtype magazine, under which it distributes localized Japanese animation DVDs and light novels. Haksan Publishing, founded in 1995, also produces domestic and imported comics and light novels, as well as TV animation and children's books.

=== Daewon Broadcasting ===
Daewon Broadcasting currently operates three television stations, Anione TV, AniBox, and Champ TV. All three operate on cable and satellite networks and specialize in airing domestic and imported animation, as well as some live-action tokusatsu programming. Their lineups include:

- Zatch Bell!
- Crayon Shin-Chan
- Pucca
- Fullmetal Alchemist
- xxxHolic
- Doraemon
- Power Rangers
- Yu-Gi-Oh!
- Kamen Rider
- Bakugan Battle Brawlers
- Iron Kid
- Pretty Cure
- Magi-Nation
- Digimon
- One Piece
- My Three Daughters
- Sailor Moon

=== Merchandising ===
Daewon's Charactery Company, operating as Aniland, is responsible for franchising domestic character creations, merchandising of imported products, and development of character goods. They have an exclusive merchandising agreement for Studio Ghibli goods, but also produce items from a wide variety of Japanese animation titles. Bandai Korea provides merchandising and character goods services for Bandai Japan. Their products include items based on series such as Naruto, One Piece, and Gundam.

=== Gaming & Internet ===
Daewon Game Company develops hardware and software components for gaming systems, formerly including Nintendo Japan. Daewon Digital Entertainment provides internet services for comics and animation and handles film imports and drama productions.
