= 2000 in South Korean music =

The following is a list of notable events and releases that happened in 2000 in music in South Korea.

== Debuting and disbanded in 2000 ==
=== Debuting groups ===
- CB Mass
- Chakra
- Cherry Filter
- Moon Child
- Papaya
- UN

=== Solo debuts ===
- BoA
- Hwayobi
- Jiwon
- Kim C
- Lyn
- Wax

=== Disbanded groups ===
- Sechs Kies
- Turbo
- Uptown

== Releases in 2000 ==
=== January ===
Date	Title	Artist	Genre(s)
21	Technogoofy	Goofy	K-pop
24	Things I Can't Do For You (해줄 수 없는 일)	Park Hyo-shin	Ballad
26	E-mail My Heart	Turbo	K-pop
26	Classic	Jo Sung-mo	Pop ballad

=== February ===
Date	Title	Artist	Genre(s)
10	White	Im Chang-jung	K-pop
11	Sad But True...	Delispice	Rock
24	Genderless	Can	Hard rock

=== March ===
Date	Title	Artist	Genre(s)
2	Come A Come	Chakra	K-pop
20	Good Time	Cleo	K-pop
23	A Guidebook for Brokenhearted People (헤어진 사람들을 위한 지침서)	Yoon Jong-shin	K-pop
24	Terminal Dream Flow	Crash	Thrash metal
29	The Great Rebirth	Drunken Tiger	Hip hop

=== April ===
Date	Title	Artist	Genre(s)
2	Eternity Friends	Lee Ji-hoon	K-pop
6	New World	Clon	Dance music
14	HEAD-UP	Cherry Filter	Rock
14	Delete	Moon Child	rock
18	Rogue	Baek Ji-young	K-pop
21	Cool 5	Cool	K-pop
21	In Love	J	R&B, Soul
22	2nd Round	1TYM	Hip hop

=== May ===
Date	Title	Artist	Genre(s)
16	Story of Two Years	Yim Jae-beom	Rock
16	The Life... DOC Blues	DJ DOC	Hip hop
22	The 3rd Eye	Kim Hyun-jung	Dance, R&B
24	From Dawning to Now	Young Turks Club	Dance-pop
27	Only One	Shinhwa	K-pop
29	Why	Baby Vox	K-pop
31	Thanks	Sechs Kies	K-pop, Ballad

=== June ===
Date	Title	Artist	Genre(s)
1	Lee Jung Hyun II	Lee Jung-hyun	K-pop
12	A Song of the Wind	Roo'ra	Hip hop
14	My All	Hwayobi	K-pop, R&B
15	I Wanna Be...	T.T.Ma	K-pop
28	ONE+ONE	As One	K-pop
29	Challenge	Click-B	K-pop

=== July ===
Date	Title	Artist	Genre(s)
1	와인	Kim Kyung-ho	Hard rock
15	Hong Kyung Min 3	Hong Kyung-min	Pop rock
26	Coming of Age Ceremony (성인식)	Park Ji-yoon	K-pop
31	United 'n' - Generation	UN	R&B

=== August ===
Date	Title	Artist	Genre(s)
12	The Four Letter Word Love	Sharp	K-pop
16	Fairy Tail	Papaya	K-pop
18	Seomoontak II	Seomoon Tak	Rock
25	ID; Peace B	BoA	K-pop

=== September ===
Date	Title	Artist	Genre(s)
1	Let Me Love	Jo Sung-mo	Pop ballad
6	Massmediah	CB Mass	Hip hop
8	Ultramania	Seo Taiji	Nu metal
29	Outside Castle	H.O.T.	K-pop

=== October ===
Date	Title	Artist	Genre(s)
16	Autumn in My Heart OST	Various	OST
17	Naturally	Lena Park	Pop ballad
29	Now	Fin.K.L	K-pop

=== November ===
Date	Title	Artist	Genre(s)
1	Winter Story	Can	Hard rock
1	www.love.7th	Im Chang-jung	K-pop
2	Passion	Koyote	Hip hop
3	Chapter 3	g.o.d	K-pop
7	Remember	Kim Bum-soo	K-pop
8	Naughty Diva	Diva	K-pop
13	The Diary of Mom (엄마의 일기)	Wax	R&B, Ballad
24	Summit Revival	Yoo Seung-jun	K-pop, Hip hop
Unknown	Chocolate	J	R&B, Soul

=== December ===
Date	Title	Artist	Genre(s)
8	Christmas Winter Vacation in SMTOWN.com	SMTOWN	K-pop
11	No. 4	Goofy	Dance music, Hip hop
13	My First Confession	Lyn	K-pop
20	A Letter from Greenland	S.E.S.	K-pop
27	ChoPD.Net / Best In East	Cho PD	Hip hop

== See also ==
- 2000 in South Korea
- List of South Korean films of 2000
