= Seongnam Central Library =

Library in Seongnam, South Korea

- 중앙도서관
- 37.40423645594882°N 127.13482438476035°E
- Location: Gyeonggi-do, South Korea
- Established: 2001

Other information
- Website: https://www.snlib.go.kr/ct/index.do

- Seongnam Central Library
- Hangul: 성남시 중앙 도서관
- Hanja: 城南市 中央 圖書館
- Revised Romanization: Seongnamsi jungang doseogwan
- McCune–Reischauer: Sŏngnamsi chungang tosŏgwan

The Seongnam Central Library (Korean: 성남시중앙도서관) is located in Yatap-dong, Seongnam, South Korea. It opened in 2001, and is the largest library in Seongnam city.

== Library layout ==
The library has five levels

=== Underground ===
- Cafeteria
- Convenience Store

=== First Floor ===
- Family Reading Room
- Kids Reading Room
- Kids Library
- Disabilities Reading Room
- Main Hall
- Hall Reading Room (approximately 200 seats)

=== Second Floor ===
- Cyber Room (including DVD seats, Audio seats, Computer seats and Laptop seats)
- "First Library" (Science, Art, Religion, Language, Philosophy, Society, Others, Encyclopedia, English books)
- "Second Library" (Literature, History)

(The collections include over 300 000 books)

=== Third Floor ===
- First Reading Room (216 seats, no carrells)
- Second Reading Room (216 seats)
- Outside Terrace
- Screen Room

=== Fourth Floor ===
- Third Reading Room (216 seats, for adults)
- Fourth Reading Room( 216 seats)

== Library conditions of use ==
- Under 12 years old children (Korean are 14 years old) cannot use Reading room, Cyber room and Library (except for those specifically designated for children)
- Library users must create an account with a card (this can use every library in Seongnam). It can access all rooms. Exceptions for children and cafeteria usage.
- Access to reading room seats (except Kid's reading rooms) requires the card.

== Restrictions ==
- Without parental guidance, children are not allowed in many of the library spaces
- During Exam Seasons (late April-early May, July, late September-early October, December) and vacation (peak season Summer and Winter) seating may in high demand.
- The First and Second Reading Room close at 10 pm.
- The library is closed on Mondays.

== Sources ==
- https://www.snlib.go.kr/ct/
