= Kim Hae-lin =

South Korean figure skater (born 1995)

Personal information
- Born: February 11, 1995 (age 31) Gyeonggi-do
- Home town: Gyeonggi-do
- Height: 1.50 m (4 ft 11 in)

Figure skating career
- Country: South Korea
- Coach: Kim Se-yol
- Skating club: Gwacheon

- Kim Hae-lin
- Hangul: 김혜린
- RR: Gim Hyerin
- MR: Kim Hyerin

Kim Hae-lin (born February 11, 1995) is a South Korean figure skater.

== Career ==
Born in Gyeonggi-do, she competed at the 2010 World Junior Figure Skating Championships, where she placed 37th. She competed in the short program but could not advance to the free skate due to her low placement.

== Programs ==
Season	Short program	Free Skating
2009–2010	Warsaw Concerto by Richard Addinsell	Il Ji Mae by Ryo Yoshimata

== Competitive highlights ==
International
Event	2009–2010
Junior Worlds	37th
National
South Korean Champ.	3rd J.
J. = Junior level

== Detailed results ==
2009–2010 season
Date	Event	Level	SP	FS	Total
March 8–14, 2010	2010 ISU World Junior Championships	Junior	37; 36.26	- -	37; 36.26
January 9–10, 2010	2010 South Korean Championships	Junior	6; 34.11	3; 62.76	3; 96.87
