= Kim Wol-ha =

Kim Wol-ha (Korean: 김월하; Hanja: 金月荷; February 8, 1918 – January 1, 1996), real name Kim Duk-sun (김덕순; 金德順), was a South Korean singer, a master of gugak, an Ingan-munhwage of gagok, a master of sijo and gasa, distinguished performer and teacher.

== Biography ==
She was born on February 8, 1918, in Hanjin, Gyeonggi Province, Korea. At age 2 her grandmother, mother and two brothers died from cholera. Her father was shocked by the deaths and abandoned her. She lived with her aunt for two years, and was adopted by a woman named Ryu who lived in Sagan-dong, Jongno-gu, Seoul. At that time, her name was Yoo Jung-hwan. Her sister called her to home to Suwon as her father had returned. She married at 16. Her husband worked in Yangju country office. She went to evening high school affiliated with the Myodong Church in Seoul. Then the Korean War broke out and her husband was taken by the Communist military. She moved to Busan until the war end and made her living by sewing. She suffered from an ulcer and heard sijo while walking in the Busan dongdaesindong Gudeok catchment area. She practiced sijo alone, but she was so talented that has caught an eye of an expert sijo singer and was introduced to Kim Tae-young. She studied for three years in Busan, under Lee Byung-sung who studied in yiwangjik aakbu. She learned to sing and learned lyric of sijo. During that time, she changed her name to Wol-ha. In 1973, she becomes the holder of gagok, the Important Intangible Cultural Property No.30. Later, she established Wol-ha Cultural Foundation and gave scholarship to more than 100 deserving students.

== Career ==
- 1955.7—Education at Leeds Dongnae
- 1955.9—Kyungnam High School (vocal) instructor
- 1955-1958—Busan Education Board (vocal) instructor
- 1956—Busan Horticultural School (vocal) instructor
- 1961-1967—President of South Korea Jung akwon, Education
- 1968—Gukak Association of Korea Director and Chairman of this Subcommittee jeongak
- 1970.1—Korea Association founder gukak subcommittee
- 1971.11—Appointed vice-chairman of the Ministry of chungmuhoe
- 1973.11—Important Intangible Cultural Property No. 30

== Awards ==
- 1995—Special Achievement Award KBS gukak prize
- 1994—Seoul's citizen prize
- 1992—Bogwanjang Order of Culture
- 1991—Culture Award three kinds
- 1988—National Medal of mokryeonjang
- 1984—Sejong prize
- 1984—Gukak prize
- 1958—President Syngman Rhee Memorial songbirds Sun Yet Sin Contest
