= Korea Human Rights Foundation =

The Korea Human Rights Foundation (KHRF) was established in 1999 by prominent human rights experts, activists, lawyers, and academics following the commemorative events of the 50th anniversary of the Universal Declaration of Human Rights, the foundation's stated mission is to promote human rights and solidarity in Korea.

Since its founding, KHRF has made significant contributions to the development of both the human rights movement and discourse in Korea by creating a platform for human rights activists, academics and all stakeholders to communicate through conferences, seminars and training workshops as well as publishing journals and newsletters.

== Mission ==
The KHRF's mission is to promote human rights values and culture through human rights education, research and leadership building in Korea and Asia. The main projects of KHRF can be broken down by A-B-C-D-E.

- Asia: Facilitating exchange between human rights defenders in Asia and Korea
- Business: Promoting corporate human rights accountability
- City: Realizing human rights in the city
- Development: Integrating human rights in international development cooperation
- Education: Enhancing human rights awareness among youth as well as teachers

== Asia and Human Rights (AHR) ==
KHRF has been facilitating exchange between human rights defenders in Asia and Korea to strengthen Asian solidarity. To bridge the information gap, KHRF along with volunteer and intern reporters has been running an online news blog, www.humanrights.or.kr, reporting on the current human rights development inside Korea.

KHRF plans to develop an Asian program in the three thematic areas such as business, city (local government) and international development cooperation (B-C-D) based on the partnerships with key actors and partner organizations in Asia in the near future.

== Business and Human Rights (BHR) ==
The BHR program is one of the three thematic programs of KHRF along with local government or city (CHR) and development cooperation (DHR) with an aim of realizing all human rights in the context of the city and the local government. As a member of the Global Compact Network in Korea, KHRF has the vital role of providing space for various stakeholders such as companies, government agencies, civil society organizations, labor unions, academics to share and reflect regarding human rights and at the same time engaging in educational and research activities to promote corporate human rights accountability. KHRF publishes a regular e-newsletter in Korean on news and issues related to business and human rights.

== City and Human Rights (CHR) ==
The KHRF program was initiated in 2011, in response to an invitation from the Metropolitan City of Gwangju to join as co-organizer the 1st World Human Rights Cities Forum (WHRCF) -www.humanrightscity.net – held in Gwangju on 16–18 May 2011. KHRF has organized the 1st Global Human Rights City Essay Contest as well as Experts’ Panel on Guiding Principles for a Human Rights City as part of the 2nd WHRCF which was held on 16–17 May 2012. KHRF was involved in the 3rd WHRCF, which was held on 16–18 May 2013, with a special focus on the development of the "Gwangju Global-Local Compact: Guiding Principles for a Human Rights City"

KHRF has been organizing a series of consultation seminars and workshops with civil servants, CSOs, academics on issues related to the role of the city or local government for the promotion and protection of human rights including the 2012 National Conference on Human Rights City, which was held in Busan, Korea on 11–12 Feb 2012 and the Public Dialogue on Human Rights Policies in Metropolitan City of Seoul on 24 July 2012. KHRF also has been publishing a monthly e-newsletter in Korean on news and issues related to city and human rights since January 2012.

== Development and Human Rights (DHR) ==
The DHR is one of the three thematic pillars of KHRF's various programs to address emerging human rights challenges in Korea and abroad. It is focused on education and training on how to integrate human rights into international development cooperation, in particular, the human rights-based approach to development (HRBA or RBA). KHRF, as a member of Steering Committee of the Korea Civil Society Forum on International Development Cooperation (KoFID), has actively participated in the OECD's 4th High-level Forum on Aid Effectiveness held in Busan from 29 November to 1 December 2011.

KHRF published a research paper on the "Impact of ODA on Human Rights" in 2007 and has regularly conducted a series of training programs on the RBA for CSOs and policy-makers including the most recent in early 2012 under the sponsorship of the Korea International Cooperation Agency (KOICA).

== Education and Human Rights (EHR) ==
The EHR is a cross-cutting program as human rights education and training is a core mandate of KHRF since its establishment in 1999. KHRF has been organizing various types of human rights education program such as the Jeju National Conference on Human Rights and thematic workshop and seminars for students, youth as well as teachers.

One of the main programs, first launched in 2011, is the Korea Human Rights Moot Court on international human rights issues in cooperation with the Ministry of Justice (MoJ). This aims at promoting human rights awareness among university and law school students about pressing international human rights challenges. Award of the Minister of justice is given to winners of the contest.

As part of EHR, KHRF annually organizes the Human Rights Academy Gil meaning "Human Rights Academy Way" which is a public lecture program on general and key thematic issues including A-B-C-D. KRHF also selects approximately a dozen "Human Rights Books of the Year" among the hundreds of books published at the end of the year as a way to promote human rights culture in Korea.

== Homepage ==
http://humanrights.or.kr/english
