= 1996 Goseong fire =

1996 forest fire in Goseong County, South Korea

- Location of the fire
- Native name: 1996년 고성 산불
- Date: April 23–25, 1996
- Location: South Korea Gangwon Province, Goseong County, Jukwang-myeon
- Cause: Sparks from TNT detonation igniting forest
- Outcome: 3,834 hectares burned, 227 buildings destroyed, 140 people displaced
- Property damage: 22,717 million KRW

The 1996 Goseong fire was a wildfire that broke out on April 23, 1996, in Jukwang-myeon, Goseong County, Gangwon Province, South Korea. By the time the fire was extinguished on April 25, a total of 3,834 hectares of forest had been burned in Goseong County. The fire was caused by improper disposal of expired TNT explosives at a nearby army firing range, leaving 140 people from 49 households homeless and causing total damages exceeding 22.7 billion won. The affected area is now managed by the Korea Forest Service's National Institute of Forest Science, which has divided the burned zone into natural recovery areas and plantation forests, and oversees ongoing scientific research and ecological restoration work in the region.

== Course of events ==
=== April 23 ===
The fire broke out at approximately 12:22 p.m. on April 23. At 12:40 p.m., a temporary forest firefighting command post was established within the Army's 6123rd unit. At 2:30 p.m., Goseong County Vice Governor Sim U-seok (심우석) requested all available helicopters from the Korea Forest Service, but due to dry weather conditions, simultaneous wildfires had broken out in Pyeongchang, Yanggu, and Inje, preventing timely helicopter deployment to Goseong. At 3:10 p.m., the first Forest Service helicopter unit arrived on scene and began firefighting operations. Military helicopters and fire trucks arrived subsequently, but firefighting remained difficult.

At around 8:30 p.m., a fire broke out in the northern part of Myeongpa-ri in Hyeonae-myeon, Goseong County, near the 38th parallel, burning 120 hectares of forest. Some facilities at the Unification Observatory were also destroyed in this fire.

=== April 24 ===
Around midnight, strong winds of 20 metres per second swept through the fire area, causing the fire to spread rapidly to nearby homes. Local forestry workers, public service workers, and Jukwang-myeon office staff concentrated on evacuating residents from their homes, preventing casualties. Due to the spreading fire, the command post relocated to the Jukwang-myeon office at around 2:00 a.m. The fire also spread to the parking lot on the north side of Songji Lake Beach, and communications cables on the ridge connecting Sokcho and Goseong were burned, disrupting long-distance telephone service for 14 hours. Driven by northwesterly winds, the fire continued to spread toward the coast and southward, reaching Unbong-ri, Hakya-ri, and Dowon-ri in Toseong-myeon.

The military began restricting tourist access to the affected area from 10:00 a.m. In addition, response teams urgently evacuated 162 villagers from farmhouses in Injeong-ri, Sampo-ri, Unbong-ri, and Hakya-ri based on predicted fire spread directions. With large-scale wildfires occurring simultaneously, the limited number of helicopters proved insufficient to fully extinguish the fires, and residual embers reignited combustible materials such as fallen leaves, causing the fire to flare up again and posing significant challenges to firefighting efforts. The spreading wildfire burned most of Jukwang-myeon overnight, while strong winds reaching 30 metres per second during the day further fanned the flames. At around 11:15 p.m., some residents suggested creating a firebreak by conducting a controlled burn around Taldong-ri in Ganseong-eup to prevent the fire from spreading to surrounding areas. Firefighters adopted this suggestion.

=== April 25 ===
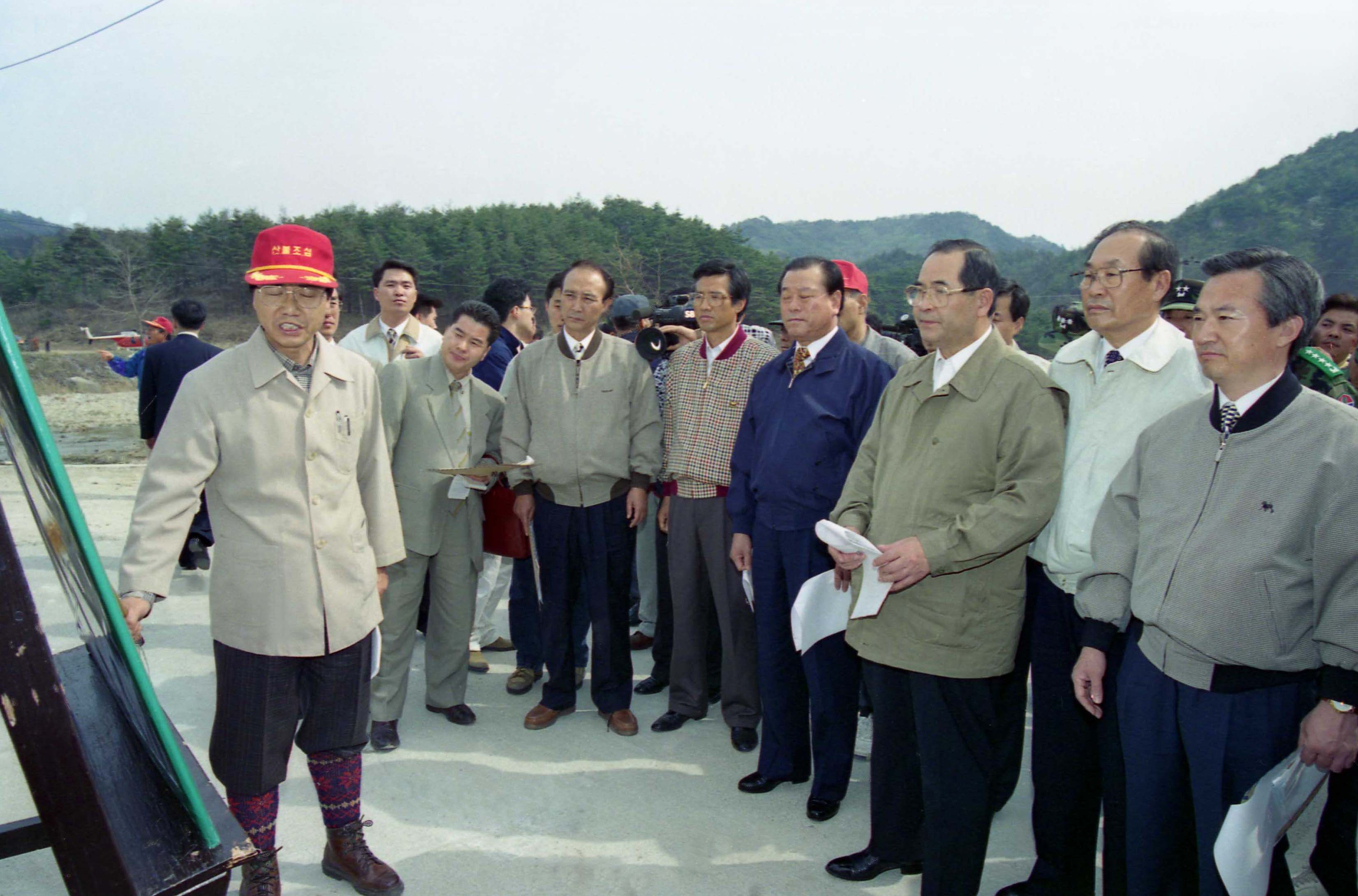
Then-Prime Minister Lee Soo-sung (third from right) inspecting the scene

From 5:30 a.m., Goseong County received an additional 11 police and military helicopters, bringing the total to 20 helicopters deployed on scene, while the number of firefighters participating increased to over 10,000. The command post evacuated approximately 80 people from 27 households in villages near Dowon-ri, Hakya 2-ri, and Seonyusil-ri — areas newly reached by the fire — to military barracks, senior centers, or the homes of their relatives.

That morning, then-President Kim Young-sam telephoned Prime Minister Lee Soo-sung and ordered him to travel to the fire scene to oversee firefighting, assess the extent of damage, support reconstruction, and reassure the public. At 2:30 p.m., Lee Soo-sung arrived in the Taldong area to inspect firefighting and relief operations. Gangwon Province Governor Choi Gak-gyu requested that he declare the fire-affected area a special disaster zone and also requested that the government provide rural housing financing funds to residents whose homes had been destroyed to support their post-disaster reconstruction.

The command post dispatched 25 helicopters along with over 4,000 military personnel and local residents to participate in firefighting near Dowon-ri in Toseong-myeon near Seoraksan National Park and around Taldong-ri in Gansong-eup. At around 4:20 p.m., the fire was extinguished. At 6:10 p.m., all participating firefighting helicopters withdrew, and the command post officially announced the completion of firefighting operations. To prevent rekindling, the command post stationed 170 public officials and 15 fire trucks to monitor conditions in the affected area.

=== April 26 ===
As the risk of rekindling diminished and monitoring public officials were exhausted, all monitoring personnel withdrew at 1:30 a.m. At 6:30 a.m., a small fire broke out near a public cemetery in Gajin-ri in a rice paddy field and was subsequently extinguished. After confirming no further fires would occur, most personnel and equipment withdrew from the area.

== Damage ==
Of the 50 houses in Sampo 1-ri village, Jukwang-myeon, Goseong County, 38 were burned, making it the most severely affected area in the fire. The forests around Taldong-ri in Gansong-eup and Dowon-ri in Toseong-myeon had been major production areas for wild matsutake mushrooms, all of which were destroyed after the fire, depriving local residents of an important source of income.

On April 28, the Korea Forest Service and the incident command issued joint investigation results, concluding that the forest soil had been severely damaged and would require at least 40 to 100 years to recover. It was estimated that the area affected by ecological destruction amounted to approximately 10,000 hectares — three times the officially announced burned area — due to disrupted food chains and inability of plant seeds to disperse. The burned forest areas lost their capacity to absorb carbon dioxide, and it was predicted that the ecological corridor connecting the Civilian Control Zone and Seoraksan would be severed for decades.

=== Extent of damage ===
The final confirmed scale of damage was as follows:

- Affected persons: 140 people from 49 households
- Forest: 3,834 hectares (over 11 million pyeong)
  - Trees: 2,762 hectares
  - Matsutake mushrooms: 16,125 kilograms
  - Graves and other sites: 66
- Buildings: 227
- Personal property: 53,423 items
  - Household goods: 12,133 items
  - Agricultural machinery: 17,745 items
  - Leather: 718 rolls
  - Fruit trees and others: 21,052
  - Feed and others: 1,775 items
- Total damage: 22,717 million KRW

== Cause and accountability ==
The ignition point was the firing range of the 58th Ammunition Battalion of the 8th Logistics Support Regiment, 1st Logistics Support Command of the Republic of Korea Army, located in the Jukbyeonsan Valley of Maja-ri, Jukwang-myeon. According to a report by the Ministry of National Defense, the fire was caused when Sergeant Jeong Jae-seok (정재석), head of the explosives disposal team, failed to follow proper procedures while destroying 525 expired TNT bombs. Under regulations, TNT should be burned collectively after removing signal flares from the site, but the sergeant did not carry out this preparatory step; instead, he simply dug a hole approximately 60 centimetres deep at the public firing range and detonated the TNT inside it. This caused nearby signal flares to undergo sympathetic detonation, and the resulting sparks were blown by strong winds into the forest upstream of the valley, starting the wildfire. Following the incident, the army arrested the sergeant on suspicion of negligent arson, dismissed Major Shin Yu-seung (신유승), commander of the battalion, and referred Colonel Jeong Jae-ho (정재호), commander of the 8th Regiment, to the regimental disciplinary committee. However, this disciplinary response drew criticism not only from the public but also from within the Ministry of National Defense. Observers argued that given the enormous scale of damage caused by the fire, merely disciplining a single non-commissioned officer was clearly insufficient to appease public sentiment. Furthermore, the army was criticized for passively punishing itself while actively concealing the truth, having refused broadcasting companies' requests to deploy helicopters to film the wildfire on the grounds that relevant regulations prohibited it.

== Reasons for delayed firefighting ==
Strong winds, dry weather, rugged terrain, lack of equipment, and shortage of skilled personnel were all factors that prevented the fire from being extinguished within three days, significantly increasing the damage. In the early stages of the fire, persistently strong winds accelerated the spread of the fire, and the wind direction changed almost every minute; combined with dry weather conditions, this made it difficult for rescue personnel to determine the direction of fire spread. Most of the ignition areas were located on rugged terrain with little human access, meaning that firefighting had to rely primarily on helicopters, and the large numbers of personnel deployed did not produce significant results. In addition, Gangwon Province had no helicopters dedicated to wildfire suppression operations and could only provide basic firefighting equipment, which also contributed to missed opportunities for firefighting. Of the more than 10,000 personnel deployed during the response, only around 2,000 had received professional firefighting training. The wildfire prompted calls for ensuring an adequate budget for large-scale wildfire response.

Some analyses also pointed to an inadequate rapid mobilization system for extinguishing fires promptly when they first break out as one reason the fire later became difficult to control. When the fire was first detected, Goseong County requested helicopter support from the Korea Forest Service, but it took an hour and a half for helicopters to arrive on scene. Others noted that because the fire broke out near a military base, there was a risk of unexploded munitions detonating, preventing rescue personnel and equipment from easily approaching the area and making conditions unsuitable for rapid fire suppression.

Local residents pointed out that administrative agencies had been conducting thinning of Japanese red pine forests on the mountains to eradicate pests such as the pine needle gall midge (Thecodiplosis japonensis), and the felled pines were not removed but left on the mountain, causing them to quickly ignite when the wildfire broke out and resulting in further destruction. Moreover, the military base did not broadcast any evacuation notice to residents for 13 hours after the fire broke out, causing them to suffer additional unnecessary losses. Local residents and public officials who participated in firefighting operations expressed considerable dissatisfaction with the military's failure to respond promptly, which had allowed the fire to spread, and argued that all those responsible for the fire should be arrested.

== Aftermath ==
On April 26, 1996, then-President Kim Young-sam instructed the cabinet to formulate comprehensive countermeasures for the Goseong wildfire and subsequent large-scale forest fires by June of that year. The following day, the government convened a relevant ministerial meeting to prepare comprehensive wildfire prevention measures, at which it determined that the cause of the fire was negligence on the part of the Ministry of National Defense and decided to pay state compensation to residents of the affected area. It was also decided to establish a Central Incident Command for the Goseong wildfire, headed by the Minister of Agriculture, Forestry and Fisheries, to lead subsequent procedures including investigation of the fire's cause and extent of damage. On the same day, a joint ministerial investigation team arrived on scene to conduct detailed investigations into residents' property and forest damage, and decided to provide special support including rice seeds, production machinery, and funds to affected residents. The army also issued instructions to its subordinate units to mobilize all troops and equipment to assist in reconstruction of the disaster area. Gangwon Province suspended collection of property tax, urban planning tax, comprehensive land tax, and local taxes from residents in the affected areas for six months.

On June 19 of the same year, the Ministry of Climate, Energy and Environment announced plans to establish an ecosystem recovery test site. This test site was to be selected from an area within the burned zone that was unaffected by residents' economic activities; the area would remain unplanted for 50 to 100 years, with dedicated personnel observing the natural recovery process of the ecological environment within the site. In addition, two natural recovery areas of 30 hectares and 70 hectares respectively were established in Jukwang-myeon, Goseong County.

According to a report from April 1997, the Forest Service formulated a reforestation plan to quickly restore the matsutake mushroom industry on which local residents depended for their livelihoods. However, because the reforestation timeline was urgent but a large quantity of seedlings was difficult to obtain in a short time, the authorities decided to use fast-growing greenhouse-cultivated trees. This decision drew criticism from several forestry scholars.

== Post-disaster situation ==
In April 1997, 316 residents of Goseong County filed a class action lawsuit against the state, seeking compensation for damages to the matsutake mushroom picking industry caused by the wildfire. On August 15 of the same year, the 8th Military Support Group Regional Compensation Deliberation Committee dismissed the residents' lawsuit on the grounds that the fire starter was a civilian who had constructed the firing range facilities, and thus the State Compensation Act was not applicable. On December 3, 1998, the Seoul District Court issued a compulsory mediation ruling in the aforementioned class action, ordering the state to pay residents 8.4 billion won in compensation.

As of April 2005, nine years after the fire, the quality and density of vegetation in the two natural recovery areas in Goseong County were far higher than in the plantation areas, but many areas still had poor soil and sparse vegetation, with recovery to a normal forest appearance estimated to require another 10 years. According to a study by the National Institute of Forest Science under the Korea Forest Service in June 2009, 16 species of wild birds were observed in the wildfire-damaged area, recovering to 80% compared to 20 species in the surrounding undamaged areas. According to a report from April 2010, pine trees artificially planted after the fire were growing normally, but oak trees growing in the natural recovery areas showed serious discoloration and hollow formation. As of May 2015, most of the pine forests that had existed before the incident had disappeared, and broadleaved trees such as oaks, sawtooth oaks, and Korean rhododendrons had grown to 2–3 metres in height. In addition to the natural recovery areas, plantation forests managed by the Yangyang National Forest Management Office of the Eastern Regional Forest Service were also established. The plantation forests, which are single-species plantings of only pine and birch trees, had developed to some extent into forests of a certain scale. However, due to reduced soil fertility caused by the forest fire, the height of pine trees in the plantation forests was only 41–71.9% of normal pine tree height.

== See also ==
- 2019 Goseong fire

== Further readings ==
- 신형순 (April 24, 1996). 강원도 고성 산불 계속 번져 [Gangwon Goseong wildfire continues to spread]. MBC News. Munhwa Broadcasting Corporation. Archived from the original on June 21, 2015.
