= Daewon Broadcasting =

South Korean broadcasting company

Daiwon Digital Broadcasting, Ltd. is a Korean company jointly launched by Daewon Media, Toei Animation, Shogakukan, Bandai, TMS Entertainment, Sunrise, Gina World and Bandai Korea.

Established in 2001, the company had a capital of US$4.2 million, with 8.25% provided by Toei and around 11% by Bandai and its subsidiaries. Since the beginning, its channels were carried by SkyLife.

The company owns animation channels Anione and Anibox, as well as Channel J, a channel specialized in Japanese content.
