= 1995 municipal annexation in South Korea =

The 1995 municipal annexation in South Korea was an administrative event in which many cities and counties joined together into "urban-rural integrated" cities (도농복합시, i.e. city-county consolidation) as of 1 January 1995. Some of the annexation were done later as of 10 May 1995. Some of the counties were annexed to certain metropolitan cities (광역시) as of 1 March 2015.

The purpose of this annexation plan was to resolve certain problems related to municipal government; for instance, discord between administrative districts and life spheres. The relevant municipalities had the same history in that they once belonged to the same county or municipality before the central town of the country was separated as a city.

However, cities separated from old counties of Gwangju (in Gyeonggi Province), Suwon (Hwaseong), Siheung and Bucheon, in the suburbs of Seoul, were not considered for such annexation. For Daejeon, Busan and Gwangju (in Honam area), the remnant counties (Daedeok to Daejeon, Dongnae to Busan, and Gwangsan to Gwangju) were already annexed to the relevant metropolitan cities. Annexation of Ganghwa County to Incheon was not related to Incheon's historical background, but rather a political scheme to expand Incheon in size.

In fact, many of the relevant municipalities before the annexation were formed after the Great municipal annexation in 1914 as the Japanese colonial government and later the South Korean government had implemented a policy to separate urban areas into cities from existing counties.

== List of cities and counties joined into "urban-rural integrated" cities in 1995 ==
Note: The names of former cities and counties before the 1995 annexation are complied with the old standard Romanisation, or McCune–Reischauer Romanisation. The names of the current "integrated" cities are complied with the current Revised Standard Romanisation (effective as of 2000). The names of some former counties that were not existent at the time of the annexation in 1995 are also complied with the current Romanisation. Cities that are not specified as "metropolitan city" are all "municipal" cities.

=== Gyeonggi area ===
- Kanghwa County (now Ganghwa County, Incheon) + Ongjin County (now Ongjin County, Incheon) → annexed to Incheon Metropolitan City. Some parts of Ongjin County were a part of former Bucheon County.
- Migŭm City + Namyangju County → Namyangju City
- P'yŏngt'aek City + Songt'an City + Pyŏngt'aek County → Pyeongtaek City
- Tiny sections of Gwangmyeong City → Seoul's Geumcheon-gu & Guro-gu
- Tiny section of Jichuk-dong in Goyang City → Seoul's Eunpyeong-gu

Guri City and Namyangju City have not yet merged. Yangju City and Dongducheon City have not yet merged until now, but there is a "grass-root" consolidation movement for "consolidated" Yangju City in Yangju, Uijeongbu and Dongducheon areas today.

==== Not considered for annexation ====
Cities separated from old counties of Kwangju (in Gyeonggi Province), Suwon (Hwasŏng), Siheung and Bucheon, in the suburbs of Seoul, were not considered for annexation. Some districts of Seoul that were annexed from such counties were not also considered for inter-municipal consolidation; rather, Yeongdeungpo and Gangnam areas were considered for independent municipal or metropolitan cities separated from Seoul at that time.

- From old Gwangju County: several districts in southeastern Seoul (Gangnam, Songpa and Gangdong), Seongnam City, Hanam City and Gwangju County (today's Gwangju city in Gyeonggi Province)
- From old Suwon (later Hwaseong) County: Suwon City, Osan City and Hwaseong County (today's Hwaseong City)
- From old Bucheon County: several districts in Incheon (Nam-gu, including today's Yeonsu-gu), Namdong-gu, Seo-gu, Buk-gu (today's Bupyeong and Gyeyang) and Bucheon City
- From old Siheung County: several districts in southwestern/southern Seoul (Yeongdeungpo, Guro- includes today's Geumcheon), Gwanak, Dongjak and Seocho), Anyang City, Gwangmyeong City, Ansan City, Gwacheon City, Gunpo City, Uiwang City and Siheung City.

A merger of Seoul Metropolitan City and Goyang City was not considered since former townships of old Goyang County that were later annexed to Seoul from 1936 to 1949 were mostly former outer districts of old Seoul (i.e. Hanseong Prefecture) before 1914 and the government at the time of 1995 did not consider the prefectural expansion of Seoul but rather once seriously considered a division of Seoul into several municipal or metropolitan cities.

=== Gangwon area ===
- Kangnŭng City + Myŏngju County → Gangneung City
- Ch'unch'ŏn City + Ch'unsŏng County → Chuncheon City
- Wonju City + Wonsŏng County → Wonju City
- Samch'ŏk City + Samch'ŏk County → Samcheok City

Sokcho City and Yangyang County have not yet merged until now.

=== Chungcheong area ===
- Ch'ungju City + Chungwŏn County → Chungju City
- Chech'ŏn City + Chewŏn County → Jecheon City
- Kongju City + Kongju County → Gongju City
- Taech'ŏn City + Poryŏng County → Boryeong City
- Sŏsan City + Sŏsan County → Seosan City
- Onyang City + Asan County → Asan City
- Ch'ŏnan City + Ch'ŏnwon County → Cheonan City

Cheongju City and Cheongwon County merged into 'consolidated' Cheongju City in 2014.

=== Honam area ===
- Kunsan City + Okku County → Gunsan City
- Kimje City + Kimje County → Gimje City
- Namwŏn City + Namwŏn County → Namwon City
- Chŏngju City + Chŏngŭp County → Jeongeup City
- Iri City + Iksan County → Iksan City (as of 10 May 1995)
- Sunch'ŏn City + Sŭngju County → Suncheon City
- Tonggwangyang City + Kwangyang County → Gwangyang City
- Naju City + Naju County → Naju City

Yŏsu City, Yŏch'ŏn City and Yŏch'ŏn County merged into 'consolidated' Yeosu City in 1998. Jeonju City and Wanju County have not yet merged until now. Mokpo City, Muan County and Sinan County have not yet merged until now.

=== Yeongnam area ===
- P'ohang City + Yŏngil County → Pohang City
- Kumi City + Sŏnsan County → Gumi City
- Kyŏngsan City + Kyŏngsan County → Gyeongsan City
- Kyŏngju City + Wŏlsŏng County → Gyeongju City
- Kimch'ŏn City + Kŭmnŭng County → Gimcheon City
- Chŏmch'on City + Mungyŏng County → Mungyeong City
- Sangju City + Sangju County → Sangju City
- Andong City + Andong County → Andong City
- Yŏngju City + Yŏngp'ung County → Yeongju City
- Yŏngch'ŏn City + Yŏngch'ŏn County → Yeongcheon City
- Changsŭngp'o City + Kŏje County → Geoje City
- Miryang City + Miryang County → Miryang City
- Parts of Ch'angwon County + Masan City → Masan City (now parts of 'consolidated' Changwon City)
- Parts of Ch'angwon County + Ch'angwon City → Changwon City
- Chinju City + Chinyang County → Jinju City
- Ch'ungmu City + T'ongyŏng County → Tongyeong City
- Kimhae City + Kimhae County → Gimhae City (as of 10 May 1995)
- Samch'ŏnp'o City + Sach'ŏn County → Sacheon City (as of 10 May 1995)
- Parts of Yangsan County (today's Yangsan City) → annexed to Busan Metropolitan City, forming today's Gijang County, Busan (as of 1 March 1995). The area was a remnant part of former Dongnae County before being annexed to Yangsan in 1973.
- Talsŏng County (now Dalseong County, Daegu) → annexed to Daegu Metropolitan City (as of 1 March 1995). Talsŏng County was a remnant county to Taegu Metropolitan City (대구직할시).
- Ulsan City + Ulchu County (now Ulju County, Ulsan) → Ulsan City (now Ulsan Metropolitan City). Ulchu County was annexed as Ulchu District, Ulsan City, but it became a county again as Ulsan City was promoted to a metropolitan city in 1997. Ulchu County was a remnant county to Ulsan City.
