= 1995 South Korean local elections =

- 27 June 1995

15 regional heads 972 regional councilors 230 municipal mayors 4,541 municipal councilors
- Registered: 31,048,566
- Turnout: 21,227,449; 68.4%
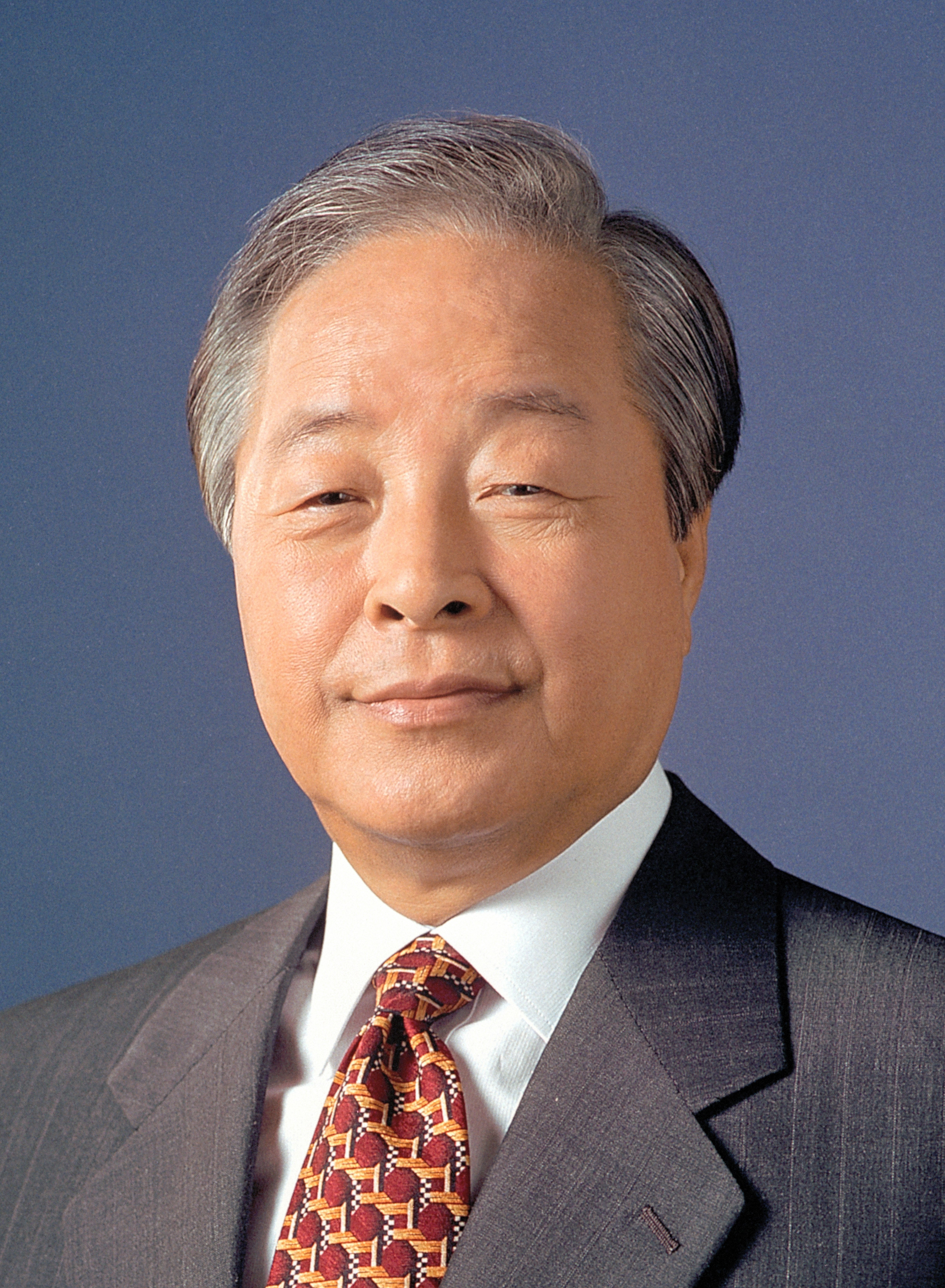

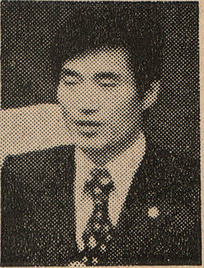

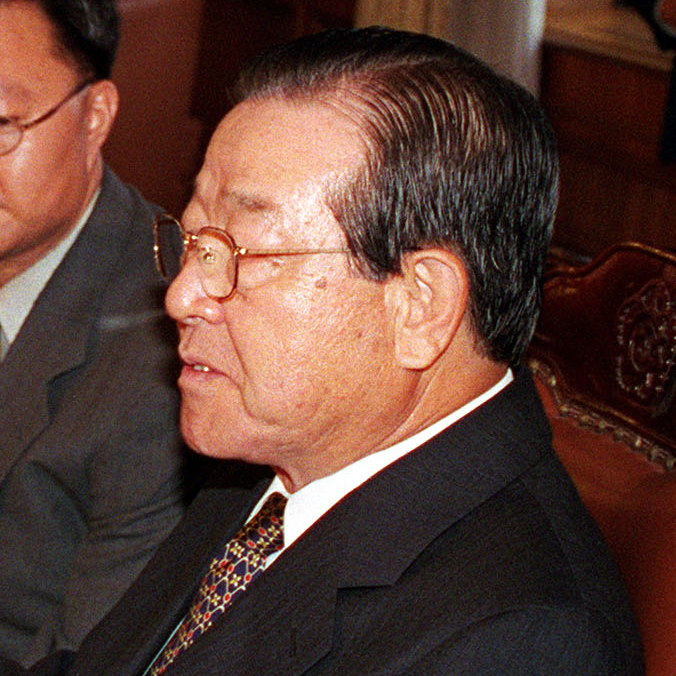
	First party	Second party	Third party
Leader	Kim Young-sam	Lee Ki-taek	Kim Jong-pil
Party	Democratic Liberal	Democratic	ULD
Regional seats won	5 heads 335 councilors	4 heads 390 councilors	4 heads 94 councilors
Regional seat change	▼229 councilors	▲204 councilors	New
Municipal seats won	70 mayors	84 mayors	23 mayors

The 1st Local Elections were held in South Korea on 27 June 1995. It was the first election of provincial and municipal officials since the May 16 coup of 1961.

== Regional head elections ==
=== Summary ===
City	Head	Elected	Party
Seoul	Mayor	Cho Soon	Democratic
Busan	Mayor	Moon Jung-soo	Democratic Liberal
Daegu	Mayor	Moon Hee-gap	Independent
Incheon	Mayor	Choi Ki-sun	Democratic Liberal
Gwangju	Mayor	Song Un-jong	Democratic
Daejeon	Mayor	Hong Sun-ki	ULD
Gyeonggi	Governor	Lee In-je	Democratic Liberal
Gangwon	Governor	Choi Guk-gyu	ULD
North Chungcheong	Governor	Ju Byeong-dok	ULD
South Chungcheong	Governor	Sim Dae-pyung	ULD
North Jeolla	Governor	Yu Jong-geun	Democratic
South Jeolla	Governor	Heo Kyeong-man	Democratic
North Gyeongsang	Governor	Lee Eui-geun	Democratic Liberal
South Gyeongsang	Governor	Kim Hyuk-ku	Democratic Liberal
Jeju	Governor	Shin Koo-bum	Independent

=== Seoul ===
Candidate	Party	Votes	%
Cho Soon	Democratic Party	2,051,441	42.36
Park Chan-jong	Independent	1,623,356	33.52
Chung Won-shik	Democratic Liberal Party	1,001,446	20.68
Hwang San-sung	Independent	97,709	2.02
Park Hong-rae	People First Party	25,054	0.52
Kim Ok-sun	Independent	17,728	0.37
Goh Soon-bok	Korea Party	10,488	0.22
Kim Myung-ho	Independent	9,992	0.21
Chung Ki-yong	Independent	6,156	0.13
Total		4,843,370	100.00
Valid votes		4,843,370	98.40
Invalid/blank votes		78,840	1.60
Total votes		4,922,210	100.00
Registered voters/turnout		7,438,025	66.18
Source: National Election Commission

=== Busan ===
Candidate	Party	Votes	%
Moon Jung-soo	Democratic Liberal Party	885,433	51.41
Roh Moo-hyun	Democratic Party	647,297	37.58
Kim Hyun-ok	Independent	169,652	9.85
Bae Sang-han	Independent	20,008	1.16
Total		1,722,390	100.00
Valid votes		1,722,390	97.84
Invalid/blank votes		38,014	2.16
Total votes		1,760,404	100.00
Registered voters/turnout		2,658,224	66.22
Source: National Election Commission

=== Daegu ===
Candidate	Party	Votes	%
Moon Hee-gap	Independent	383,272	36.79
Lee Eui-ik	United Liberal Democrats	230,668	22.14
Lee Hae-bong	Independent	222,409	21.35
Cho Hae-nyung	Democratic Liberal Party	175,749	16.87
Ahn Yu-ho	Independent	29,617	2.84
Total		1,041,715	100.00
Valid votes		1,041,715	97.88
Invalid/blank votes		22,538	2.12
Total votes		1,064,253	100.00
Registered voters/turnout		1,663,614	63.97
Source: National Election Commission

=== Incheon ===
Candidate	Party	Votes	%
Choi Ki-sun	Democratic Liberal Party	383,965	40.82
Shin Yong-seok	Democratic Party	298,544	31.74
Kang Woo-hyuk	United Liberal Democrats	258,175	27.45
Total		940,684	100.00
Valid votes		940,684	97.73
Invalid/blank votes		21,868	2.27
Total votes		962,552	100.00
Registered voters/turnout		1,551,925	62.02
Source: National Election Commission

=== Gwangju ===
Candidate	Party	Votes	%
Song Un-jong	Democratic Party	469,570	89.72
Kim Dong-hwan	Democratic Liberal Party	53,817	10.28
Total		523,387	100.00
Valid votes		523,387	98.12
Invalid/blank votes		10,006	1.88
Total votes		533,393	100.00
Registered voters/turnout		822,880	64.82
Source: National Election Commission

=== Daejon ===
Candidate	Party	Votes	%
Hong Sun-ki	United Liberal Democrats	342,959	63.76
Yeom Hong-cheol	Democratic Liberal Party	112,607	20.94
Pyon Pyung-sup	Democratic Party	58,346	10.85
Lee Dae-hyung	Independent	23,953	4.45
Total		537,865	100.00
Valid votes		537,865	98.06
Invalid/blank votes		10,664	1.94
Total votes		548,529	100.00
Registered voters/turnout		819,604	66.93
Source: National Election Commission

=== Gyeonggi ===
Candidate	Party	Votes	%
Lee In-je	Democratic Liberal Party	1,264,914	40.56
Chang Kyoung-woo	Democratic Party	923,069	29.60
Im Sa-bin	Independent	613,624	19.68
Kim Moon-won	United Liberal Democrats	316,637	10.15
Total		3,118,244	100.00
Valid votes		3,118,244	97.79
Invalid/blank votes		70,627	2.21
Total votes		3,188,871	100.00
Registered voters/turnout		5,043,054	63.23
Source: National Election Commission

=== Gangwon ===
Candidate	Party	Votes	%
Choi Gak-gyu	United Liberal Democrats	500,894	65.83
Lee Sang-ryong	Democratic Liberal Party	260,004	34.17
Total		760,898	100.00
Valid votes		760,898	97.05
Invalid/blank votes		23,101	2.95
Total votes		783,999	100.00
Registered voters/turnout		1,048,490	74.77
Source: National Election Commission

=== North Chungcheong ===
Candidate	Party	Votes	%
Ju Byeong-deok	United Liberal Democrats	250,105	36.43
Lee Yong-hee	Democratic Party	168,209	24.50
Kim Deok-young	Democratic Liberal Party	159,911	23.30
Cho Nam-sung	Independent	54,748	7.98
Yoon Suk-jo	Independent	27,880	4.06
Yang Sung-youn	Independent	25,603	3.73
Total		686,456	100.00
Valid votes		686,456	97.17
Invalid/blank votes		20,024	2.83
Total votes		706,480	100.00
Registered voters/turnout		972,170	72.67
Source: National Election Commission

=== South Chungcheong ===
Candidate	Party	Votes	%
Sim Dae-pyung	United Liberal Democrats	616,006	67.89
Park Joong-bae	Democratic Liberal Party	174,117	19.19
Cho Joong-youn	Democratic Party	117,300	12.93
Total		907,423	100.00
Valid votes		907,423	96.84
Invalid/blank votes		29,586	3.16
Total votes		937,009	100.00
Registered voters/turnout		1,270,138	73.77
Source: National Election Commission

=== North Jeolla ===
Candidate	Party	Votes	%
Yu Jong-geun	Democratic Party	653,295	67.16
Kang Hyun-wook	Democratic Liberal Party	319,452	32.84
Total		972,747	100.00
Valid votes		972,747	97.08
Invalid/blank votes		29,212	2.92
Total votes		1,001,959	100.00
Registered voters/turnout		1,360,350	73.65
Source: National Election Commission

=== South Jeolla ===
Candidate	Party	Votes	%
Heo Kyeong-man	Democratic Party	769,538	73.50
Chun Suk-hong	Democratic Liberal Party	277,386	26.50
Total		1,046,924	100.00
Valid votes		1,046,924	91.48
Invalid/blank votes		97,523	8.52
Total votes		1,144,447	100.00
Registered voters/turnout		1,504,598	76.06
Source: National Election Commission

=== North Gyeongsang ===
Candidate	Party	Votes	%
Lee Eui-geun	Democratic Liberal Party	541,535	37.95
Lee Pan-suk	Independent	489,999	34.34
Park Jun-hong	United Liberal Democrats	395,496	27.71
Total		1,427,030	100.00
Valid votes		1,427,030	96.53
Invalid/blank votes		51,343	3.47
Total votes		1,478,373	100.00
Registered voters/turnout		1,926,274	76.75
Source: National Election Commission

=== South Gyeongsang ===
Candidate	Party	Votes	%
Kim Hyuk-kyu	Democratic Liberal Party	1,177,397	63.84
Kim Yong-kyun	United Liberal Democrats	666,756	36.16
Total		1,844,153	100.00
Valid votes		1,844,153	96.31
Invalid/blank votes		70,620	3.69
Total votes		1,914,773	100.00
Registered voters/turnout		2,621,029	73.05
Source: National Election Commission

=== Jeju ===
Candidate	Party	Votes	%
Shin Koo-bum	Independent	111,205	40.65
Woo Geun-min	Democratic Liberal Party	89,000	32.53
Kang Bo-sung	Democratic Party	66,406	24.27
Shin Doo-wan	Independent	6,961	2.54
Total		273,572	100.00
Valid votes		273,572	97.64
Invalid/blank votes		6,625	2.36
Total votes		280,197	100.00
Registered voters/turnout		348,191	80.47
Source: National Election Commission

== Regional council elections ==
Party	Seats			
Party	FPTP	PR	Total	+/–
Democratic Party	352	38	390	+204
Democratic Liberal Party	286	49	335	–229
United Liberal Democrats	86	8	94	New
Independents	151	–	151	+36
Total	875	95	970	+104
Source: NEC, CLAIR

=== Results by province and city ===
Province/City	Seats	DP	DLP	ULD	IND
Seoul	147	130	17		
Busan	61	2	54		5
Daegu	41	1	10	8	22
Incheon	35	19	15		1
Gwangju	26	25	1		
Daejeon	26	1		25	
Gyeonggi	136	63	59		14
Gangwon	58	8	31	1	18
North Chungcheong	40	11	14	5	10
South Chungcheong	61	2	5	53	1
North Jeolla	58	53	2		3
South Jeolla	75	66	4		5
North Gyeongsang	92	3	56	2	31
South Gyeongsang	94	3	58		33
Jeju	20	3	9		8
Total	970	390	335	94	151
Source: NEC, CLAIR

=== Constituency seats ===
Province/City	Seats	DP	DLP	ULD	IND
Seoul	133	122	11		
Busan	55		50		5
Daegu	37		8	7	22
Incheon	32	18	13		1
Gwangju	23	23			
Daejeon	23			23	
Gyeonggi	123	57	52		14
Gangwon	52	6	27	1	18
North Chungcheong	36	10	12	4	10
South Chungcheong	55	2	3	49	1
North Jeolla	52	49			3
South Jeolla	68	62	1		5
North Gyeongsang	84	1	50	2	31
South Gyeongsang	85		52		33
Jeju	17	2	7		8
Total	875	352	286	86	151
Source: NEC, CLAIR

=== Proportional representation seats ===
Province/City	Seats	DLP	DP	ULD
Seoul	14	6	8	
Busan	6	4	2	
Daegu	4	2	1	1
Incheon	3	2	1	
Gwangju	3	1	2	
Daejeon	3		1	2
Gyeonggi	13	7	6	
Gangwon	6	4	2	
North Chungcheong	4	2	1	1
South Chungcheong	6	2		4
North Jeolla	6	2	4	
South Jeolla	7	3	4	
North Gyeongsang	8	6	2	
South Gyeongsang	9	6	3	
Jeju	3	2	1	
Total	95	49	38	8
Source: NEC, CLAIR

== Municipal mayoral elections ==
Party	Seats
Democratic Party	84
Democratic Liberal Party	70
United Liberal Democrats	23
Independent	53
Total	230
Source: NEC, CLAIR

=== Results by province and city ===
Province/City	Mayors	DP	DLP	ULD	IND
Seoul	25	23	2		
Busan	16		14		2
Daegu	8		2	1	5
Incheon	10	5	5		
Gwangju	5	5			
Daejeon	5	1		4	
Gyeonggi	31	11	13		7
Gangwon	18	1	9	1	7
North Chungcheong	11	2	4	2	3
South Chungcheong	15			15	
North Jeolla	14	13			1
South Jeolla	24	22			2
North Gyeongsang	23	1	8		14
South Gyeongsang	21		10		11
Jeju	4		3		1
Total	230	84	70	23	53
Source: NEC, CLAIR

== Municipal council elections ==
4,541 seats in municipal councils were contested by candidates who were all running as independents.

=== Seats by province or city ===
Province/City	Seats
Seoul	806
Busan	320
Daegu	203
Incheon	206
Gwangju	125
Daejeon	107
Gyeonggi	599
Gangwon	245
North Chungcheong	180
South Chungcheong	223
North Jeolla	283
South Jeolla	343
North Gyeongsang	399
South Gyeongsang	451
Jeju	51
Total	4,541
Source: National Election Commission

== Aftermath ==
President Kim Young-sam's Democratic Liberal Party (DLP) won only five of the top fifteen posts.

The main opposition, the liberal Democratic Party led by Kim Dae-jung, took control of Seoul by winning the mayoral office and 23 of the city's 25 wards. The newly founded right-wing United Liberal Democrats, formed after Kim Jong-pil quit as leader of the DLP, won three governorships.
