= Shin Gu-beom =

South Korean politician (1942–2023)

Governor of Jeju Province
- In office 27 December 1993 – 28 March 1995
- Preceded by: Woo Geun-min
- Succeeded by: Kim Moon-tak
- In office 1 July 1995 – 30 July 1998
- Preceded by: Kim Moon-tak
- Succeeded by: Woo Geun-min

Personal details
- Born: 2 February 1942 Hallim, Jeju Province, Korea, Empire of Japan
- Died: 2 November 2023 (aged 81) Jeju City, South Korea
- Party: Independent
- Education: University of North Carolina at Chapel Hill (BEc); North Carolina State University (MA)

Shin Gu-beom (Korean: 신구범; 2 February 1942 – 2 November 2023) was a South Korean politician. A member of the National Congress for New Politics, he served as Governor of Jeju Province from 1993 to 1995 and again from 1995 to 1998.

Shin died in Jeju City on 2 November 2023, at the age of 81.

== Election results ==
=== Governor of Jeju ===
Year	Elections	Constituency	Political party	Votes (%)	Remarks
1995	1st Iocal Election	Jeju (Governoral Election)	Independent	111,205 (40.64%)	Won
1998	2nd Iocal Election	Jeju (Governoral Election)	Independent	81,491 (30.78%)	Defeated
2002	3rd Iocal Election	Jeju (Governoral Election)	GNP	119,502 (45.41%)	Defeated
2014	6th Iocal Election	Jeju (Governoral Election)	NCNP	99,493 (34.53%)	Defeated
