= Kim Hyuk-kyu (politician) =

South Korean politician (1939–2025)

- 김혁규

Governor of South Gyeongsang Province
- In office 28 December 1993 – 29 March 1995
- Preceded by: Yoon Han-do
- Succeeded by: Ahn Myung-pil
- In office 1 July 1995 – 14 December 2003
- Preceded by: Ahn Myung-pil
- Succeeded by: Jang In-tae (acting); Kim Chae-yong (acting); Kim Tae-ho

Member of the National Assembly of South Korea
- In office 30 May 2004 – 12 October 2007

Personal details
- Born: 1 August 1939 Hapcheon County, Korea, Empire of Japan
- Died: 25 March 2025 (aged 85)
- Party: DLP; NKP; GNP; Uri; GUDNP; LFP
- Education: Pusan National University; Changwon National University
- Occupation: Businessman & Politician

Korean name
- Hangul: 김혁규
- Hanja: 金爀珪
- RR: Gim Hyeokgyu
- MR: Kim Hyŏkkyu

Kim Hyuk-kyu (Korean: 김혁규; 1 August 1939 – 25 March 2025) was a South Korean businessman and politician, who was a member of the Democratic Liberal Party, the Grand National Party, and the Uri Party. He served as Governor of South Gyeongsang Province from 1993 to 2003 and was a member of the National Assembly from 2004 to 2007.

In 2007, he sought the Uri Party nomination to be its presidential candidate in the upcoming election; however, he later dropped out in opposition to the Uri Party's merger with the Grand Unified Democratic New Party.

Kim died on 25 March 2025, at the age of 85.

== Election results ==
=== General elections ===
Year	Elections	Constituency	Political party	Votes (%)	Results
2004	17th National Assembly General Election	Proportional representation (4th)	Uri	8,145,824 (38.26%)	Elected

=== Local elections ===
==== Governor of South Gyeongsang ====
Year	Elections	Constituency	Political party	Votes (%)	Remarks
1995	1st Iocal Election	South Gyeongsang (Governoral Elections)	DLP	1,177,397 (63.84%)	Won
1998	2nd Iocal Election	South Gyeongsang (Governoral Elections)	GNP	939,358 (74.64%)	Won
2002	3rd Iocal Election	South Gyeongsang (Governoral Elections)	GNP	920,706 (74.50%)	Won
