= Lee Eui-geun =

South Korean politician

- Hangul: 이의근
- Hanja: 李義根
- RR: I Uigeun
- MR: I Ŭigŭn

Lee Eui-geun (Korean: 이의근; 7 November 1938 – 21 April 2009) was the governor of North Gyeongsang Province, a province in eastern South Korea. He was a member of the Hannara party. He has served three consecutive terms in the position, beginning in 1995. His name had been mentioned as a possible future candidate for prime minister.

Born in 1938 in Iseo-myeon, Cheongdo County, North Gyeongsang Province, he attended local elementary and middle schools, then transferred to Daegu Commercial High School, from which he graduated in 1958. He then went on to receive a BS in Economics from Yeungnam University in 1964. He began working for the Daegu and Gyeongbuk governments in 1961.

Lee received honorary doctorates from Khabarovsk State Academy of Economics and Law, Yeungnam University, and the Catholic University of Daegu. He was also awarded South Korea's Order of Service Merit (red stripe) in 1988.

He died from prostate cancer in 2009. He was survived by his wife, Lee Myeong Sook, and his two sons, Lee Chang Hoon and Lee Kwang Hoon.

== See also ==
- Politics of South Korea

== Election results ==
=== Local elections ===
==== Governor of North Gyeongsang ====
Year	Elections	Constituency	Political party	Votes (%)	Results
1995	1st Iocal Election	North Gyeongsang (Governoral Elections)	DLP	541,535 (37.94%)	Won
1998	2nd Iocal Election	North Gyeongsang (Governoral Elections)	GNP	911,728 (71.96%)	Won
2002	3rd Iocal Election	North Gyeongsang (Governoral Elections)	GNP	1,028,080 (85.49%)	Won

== Notes ==
1. 차기총리 한나라소속 이의근 경북지사?. The Chosun Ilbo (Korean ed.) March 6, 2006. Archived from the original on 2010-10-14.
