= 2005 in South Korean music =

The following is a list of notable events and releases that happened in 2005 in music in South Korea.

== Debuting and disbanded in 2005 ==
=== Debuting groups ===
- B. August
- Baechigi
- CSJH The Grace
- Gavy NJ
- Lady
- LPG
- Monni
- Nemesis
- Norazo
- Paran
- SS501
- Super Junior '05
- Sweet Sorrow

=== Reformed groups ===
- Sobangcha

=== Solo debuts ===
- Eru
- Ivy
- Jang Woo-hyuk
- J'Kyun
- Jessi
- Kim Woo-joo
- Lee Jaewon
- Lim Jeong-hee
- Lee Ji-hye
- Nam Hyun-joon
- Naul
- Paloalto
- The Quiett
- Seo Ji-young
- Shim Eun-jin
- Shin Hye-sung
- Tablo
- Yeon Jung-hoon

=== Disbanded groups ===
- Cleo
- Clon
- Diva
- jtL
- UN

== Releases in 2005 ==
=== First quarter ===
==== January ====
Date	Title	Artist	Genre(s)
8	Back to the Soul Flight	Naul	R&B, Ballad
17	Soul Food	Big Mama King	Ballad
25	Sassy Girl Chun-hyang OST	Various	OST
28	Very Very Nice! and Short Cake	Humming Urban Stereo	Electropop, Bossa Nova

==== February ====
Date	Title	Artist	Genre(s)
2	My First	Jo Sung-mo	Pop ballad
3	On & On	Lena Park	Pop ballad
17	Giant	Baechigi	Hip hop
18	Call Call Call	U;Nee	Pop, R&B
18	The Beautiful Rhyme Diary	Haha	Hip hop
25	The 2nd Round	Eun Jiwon	K-pop

==== March ====
Date	Title	Artist	Genre(s)
3	Effect	Buzz	Pop rock
4	Persona	Kangta	K-pop, R&B, soul, jazz
15	Super Star	Jewelry	K-pop
17	Star (별)	Byul	K-pop
21	Wonderful Life OST	Various	OST
23	Saldaga	SG Wannabe	K-pop
30	It's New!	Lee Jai-jin	K-pop

==== April ====
Date	Title	Artist	Genre(s)
4	No Pain, No Gain	Lee Jae-won	K-pop
6	Green Rose OST	Various	OST
7	Lady 1st (1집 레이디)	Lady	Dance
7	I Want to Dream Again (다시 꿈꾸고 싶다)	Sung Si-kyung	Pop ballad
12	Me, Myself, My Music	Johan Kim	K-pop
12	Behind the Smile	Yoon Jong-shin	K-pop
15	05 Man's Life	Sobangcha	K-pop
22	Pianissima	Seomoon Tak	Rock
29	Difference	Yoon Do-hyun	Rock

==== May ====
Date	Title	Artist	Genre(s)
3	Jadu 4	The Jadu	Rock
4	Without You (그대 없이 난)	Lee Ji-hye	Dance-pop
6	Love of May	Shin Hye-sung	K-pop
10	Before You Sleep	Kim Woo-joo	Ballad
13	Seventy Five Centimeter	UN	R&B
13	Hello My Teacher OST	Various	OST
14	His Story	MC Mong	Hip hop
18	It's Unique	Big Mama	K-pop
31	Become Clear	Pia	Alternative rock

==== June ====
Date	Title	Artist	Genre(s)
2	Ragga Muffin	Stony Skunk	K-pop
2	To Girls	Take	Ballad, Dance
3	Romantopia	Lee Tzsche	K-pop
8	Victory	Clon	Dance music
12	Music Is My Life	Lim Jeong-hee	K-pop
13	Persona	Kangta	K-pop
16	My Lovely Sam Soon OST	Various	OST
16	One and Only Feeling	Lyn	K-pop
17	Be Like...	Kim Gun-mo	K-pop
20	Resoundin'	Punchnello	Hip hop
21	Growing Up	KCM	R&B, Ballad
22	Warning	SS501	K-pop
23	Fun Town 20	Kim Hyun-jung	Dance, R&B
24	Girls on Top	BoA	K-pop
24	This is Me	Kim Jong-Kook	K-pop
29	Another Conception	Rux	Punk rock

==== July ====
Date	Title	Artist	Genre(s)
1	This Is Me	Kim Jong-kook	K-pop
6	Only You OST	Various	OST
14	Forever	Cool	K-pop
19	My Sweet and Free Day	Ivy	K-pop
19	Start	M. Street	K-pop
20	Something	Park Yong-ha	K-pop
21	Have a Nice Dream	Rumble Fish	Rock
26	Lextacy	Lexy	K-pop
28	Music	The Quiett	Hip hop

==== August ====
Date	Title	Artist	Genre(s)
2	Norazo - The First Album	Norazo	K-pop
5	Summer Story 2005	Shinhwa	K-pop
8	That Summer Typhoon OST	Various	OST
12	1945 Liberation (1945 해방)	Drunken Tiger	Hip hop
26	Only Diva	Diva	K-pop
30	Feel Up	Koyote	K-pop

==== September ====
Date	Title	Artist	Genre(s)
1	For the Bloom	Gummy	R&B, Soul
5	Begin to Breathe	Eru	K-pop
6	Hold My Breath	Paran	K-pop
8	Long Pretty Girls	LPG	K-pop
9	Hold my Breath	Paran	K-pop
9	IInd Winds	Lee Min-woo	K-pop
12	Rising Sun	TVXQ	K-pop
12	Triple X	Moon Heejun	K-pop
13	No More Drama	Jang Woo-hyuk	K-pop
13	Kiss Kiss	Shim Mina	Dance pop, R&B
16	Classic Odyssey	SG Wannabe	K-pop
22	Color Your Soul	Clazziquai Project	Electropop
23	In My Fantasy	Jeon Hye-bin	K-pop
25	Love.. Love..? Love..!	Wheesung	K-pop
26	Sweet Lips	Sugar	K-pop
29	The Secret Lovers OST	Various	OST
30	Emotion in Memory	Hong Kyung-min	Pop rock

==== October ====
Date	Title	Artist	Genre(s)
5	Swan Songs	Epik High	K-pop
13	Library of Soul	Leessang	Hip hop
17	Listen to My Heart	Seo Ji-young	K-pop
18	One More Time	i-13	K-pop
18	Double Dynamite	Dynamic Duo	K-pop
22	Yeon Jung-hoon Vol. 1	Yeon Jung-hoon	K-pop
28	Into the Sky	g.o.d	K-pop

==== November ====
Date	Title	Artist	Genre(s)
1	Just Clap	J'Kyun	Hip hop
2	One Way	1TYM	Hip hop
2	Goodbye	Wax	R&B, Ballad
7	The Blues	WoongSan	Jazz
8	Classic 1+1 Grand Featuring	Jo Sung-mo	Pop ballad
9	The Very First	Gavy NJ	K-pop
10	A Love to Kill OST	Various	OST
15	Sweet Sorrow	Sweet Sorrow	K-pop
15	Dear Heaven OST	Various	OST
15	Youth	Goofy	K-pop
23	The Rusted Love	MC the Max	Rock
25	One of Five	NRG	K-pop
25	Blue Castle	V.O.S	K-pop
25	Big Mama's Gift	Big Mama	K-pop
29	Poemusic	Yiruma	Piano
30	First Day, Light	Monni	Rock

==== December ====
Date	Title	Artist	Genre(s)
5	Twins	Super Junior '05	K-pop
5	Snow Prince	SS501	K-pop
20	Transition	Fly to the Sky	K-pop
23	My Girl OST	Various	OST
23	Zeeny's	Shim Eun-jin	K-pop

== See also ==
- 2005 in South Korea
- List of South Korean films of 2005
