= 2004 in South Korean music =

The following is a list of notable events and releases that happened in 2004 in music in South Korea.

== Debuting and disbanded in 2004 ==
=== Debuting groups ===
- Garion
- M. Street
- Rumble Fish
- SG Wannabe
- The TRAX
- Vanilla Unity
- V.O.S
- WA★DISH
- Wanted

=== Solo debuts ===
- Bill Stax
- Chungja
- Daby Yamamoto
- E Sens
- Humming Urban Stereo
- Illson
- Jang Yoon-jeong
- Kebee
- MayBee
- Outsider
- Paloalto
- Song Seung-heon
- Lee Seung-gi
- Taebin
- Tei
- Tony Ahn
- Younha

=== Reformed groups ===
- N.EX.T
- R.ef

=== Disbanded groups ===
- Bulldog Mansion
- Isak N Jiyeon
- K'Pop
- R.ef

== Releases in 2004 ==
=== January ===
Date	Title	Artist	Genre(s)
6	Come Outside	Outsider	Hip hop
6	Couple (연인)	Kim Yeon-woo	Ballad, Dance
7	Boy's Story in the City	M. Street	Ballad
19	Shyne 1	Shyne	K-pop
20	SG Wanna Be+	SG Wannabe	K-pop
26	Renaissance	Diva	K-pop
27	7th Issue	Seo Taiji	Pop punk, alternative rock, post-hardcore

=== February ===
Date	Title	Artist	Genre(s)
2	Footprints	Paloalto	Hip hop
2	Foxy lady	Harisu	K-pop
3	Dae Jang Geum OST	Various	OST
15	Short Cake	Humming Urban Stereo	Electropop, Bossa Nova

=== March ===
Date	Title	Artist	Genre(s)
1	The Real	V.O.S	K-pop, pop
2	Footprints	Paloalto	Hip hop
5	Glass Mask	Kim Yoon-ah	Rock
18	Be In Deep Grief	MC Sniper	Hip hop
23	Great Expectation	Cho PD	Hip hop
25	Everlasting	Kang Sung-hoon	K-pop, pop
26	Koyote 6	Koyote	K-pop, pop
26	Can U See The Bright	Lyn	K-pop
26	Rainbow. No.7	Young Turks Club	Dance-pop
30	F-iV Story	F-iV	K-pop

=== April ===
Date	Title	Artist	Genre(s)
16	Ride West	Baby Vox	K-pop
18	The Best: Soaring for a Dream	Moon Heejun	K-pop
19	Soul Tree	Park Hyo-shin	Ballad
20	The 4th Episode	Kim Bum-soo	K-pop
21	Trinity	Lee Ji-hoon	K-pop
23	180 Degree	MC Mong	Hip hop

=== May ===
Date	Title	Artist	Genre(s)
6	Re:turn 2 Mina	Shim Mina	Dance pop, R&B
7	New Radiancy 6 Group	NRG	K-pop
10	Beijing My Love OST	Various	OST
14	Now Here	Seomoon Tak	Rock
14	Instant Pig	Clazziquai Project	Electropop
17	Taxi Driver	Dynamic Duo	Hip hop
20	The Blue Night's Dream	Sung Si-kyung	Pop ballad
21	Like the First	Wanted	K-pop

=== June ===
Date	Title	Artist	Genre(s)
1	The History of Eve: Live in Seoul	Eve	K-pop
7	April Kiss OST	Various	OST
10	Taebin of 1TYM	Taebin	Hip hop
15	My Name	BoA	K-pop
15	The Return of N.EX.T Part 3: 개한민국	N.EX.T	Heavy metal
18	Evolution	Kim Jong-Kook	K-pop
25	The Dream of a Moth (나방의 꿈)	Lee Seung-gi	K-pop, Ballad
29	Reunion	UN	R&B

=== July ===
Date	Title	Artist	Genre(s)
1	Where Are We Going? (우린 어디로 가는가)	Rux	Punk rock
2	2004 Summer Vacation in SMTOWN.com	SMTOWN	K-pop
3	The Live Long Day	Lee Seung-chul	Soft rock, Ballad
6	First Love of a Royal Prince OST	Various	OST
7	Must Listen	Se7en	K-pop
8	Soul Saver	Hwayobi	K-pop, R&B
10	Rising Again	Cleo	K-pop
12	Look at Me	Lee Jung	K-pop
12	How	Kim Kyung-ho	Hard rock
12	Believe in the Moment	Onnine Ibalgwan	Rock
13	The Genesis	Bill Stax	Hip hop
14	Let's See What's Happening Now	Cool	K-pop
18	Swing Attack	Rumble Fish	K-pop
19	Full House OST	Various	OST
25	High Society	Epik High	K-pop
27	Vol. 1.5 Aemo	Chu Ga-yeoul	Folk
28	Forbidden Love OST	Various	OST
31	New Beginning	Noel	K-pop

=== August ===
Date	Title	Artist	Genre(s)
5	Nocturnal Lights... They Scatter	Yiruma	Piano
6	Beats Within My Soul	Bobby Kim	Hip hop
6	My 19 Year Old Sister-in-Law OST	Various	OST
18	810303	Eugene	K-pop
23	One Is Not A Lonely Word (하나하면 너와나)	Drunken Tiger	Hip hop
27	Brand New	Shinhwa	K-pop

=== September ===
Date	Title	Artist	Genre(s)
3	Kimgunmo	Kim Gun-mo	K-pop
6	Beautiful Mind	KCM	R&B, Ballad
9	It's Different	Gummy	R&B, Soul
10	The Colors of My Life	Lee Soo-young	K-pop
22	Memories	K'Pop	K-pop
23	The Crush of Love	J	R&B, Soul
23	I Love Soul	Kim Hyun-jung	Dance, R&B
27	Aurora	Bada	K-pop

=== October ===
Date	Title	Artist	Genre(s)
4	I'm Nothing Without You (그대없이 난 아무것도 아니다)	Lee Ki-chan	R&B
8	Karma	Lee Seung-hwan	Pop ballad
10	JNC	J-Walk, Click-B	K-pop
11	Tri-Angle	TVXQ	K-pop, pop
12	Coexistence (공존)	Yim Jae-beom	Rock
16	It's Raining	Rain	K-pop, pop
18	For the Moment	Wheesung	K-pop, pop
19	Believe	Tony An	K-pop
19	So I Am...	Na Yoon-sun	Jazz
20	Choice OST	Various	OST
28	Positive Mind	Illson	Rap, Hip hop

=== November ===
Date	Title	Artist	Genre(s)
8	Gravity	Fly to the Sky	K-pop
9	Sex and Love, Happiness	DJ DOC	Hip hop
13	Let's Play	Jinusean	K-pop, Korean hip hop
13	전인권과 안 싸우는 사람들	Jeon In-kwon	Rock
15	I'm Sorry, I Love You OST	Various	OST
16	Restoration	As One	K-pop
18	Solitude Love...	MC the Max	Rock
18	Walk Through Me	Nell	Alternative rock
22	Jinjoo & Wedding	Pearl	K-pop, R&B, Hip hop
25	Zbam	Clazziquai Project	Electropop
25	Save the Last Dance for Me OST	Various	OST
28	Rainbow	Koyote	Hip hop

=== December ===
Date	Title	Artist	Genre(s)
6	The Christmas Gift from TVXQ	TVXQ	K-pop
7	Song Seung-heon Vol. 1	Song Seung-heon	Unknown
9	An Ordinary Day	g.o.d	K-pop
17	Listen and Repeat	Hong Kyung-min	Pop rock
20	My Story	Jang Na-ra	K-pop
20	Winter Story 2004–2005	Shinhwa	K-pop

== See also ==
- 2004 in South Korea
- List of South Korean films of 2004
