= 2007 in South Korean music =

The following is a list of notable events and releases that happened in 2007 in music in South Korea.

== Debuted and disbanded in 2007 ==
=== Debuted groups ===
- 8eight
- AnyBand
- Baby Vox Re.V
- Black Pearl
- Bye Bye Sea
- Daybreak
- F.T. Island
- Galaxy Express
- Girls' Generation
- Kara
- Sultan of the Disco
- Sunny Hill
- Super Junior-T
- Supernova
- T-Max
- Tritops
- Winterplay
- Wonder Girls

=== Solo debuts ===
- Andy
- Hwang Chi-yeul
- Elly
- Hwangbo
- Kiggen
- Kim Dong-wan
- K.Will
- Min
- Min Hyo-rin
- Innovator
- Min Kyung-hoon
- Son Dam-Bi
- Zia

=== Disbanded groups ===
- AnyBand
- Black Beat
- Girl Friends
- Lady

=== Reformed groups ===
- Broken Valentine (formerly B.August)

== Releases in 2007 ==
=== First quarter ===
==== January ====
Date	Title	Artist	Genre(s)
4	Leap of Truth	Seomoon Tak	Rock
23	Remapping the Human Soul	Epik High	K-pop Pop hip hop
26	Habit	U;Nee	Pop, R&B
27	The Songs for the One	Shin Hae-chul	Jazz, big band, traditional pop
29	The Breeze of Sea	Park Hyo-shin	Ballad

==== February ====
Date	Title	Artist	Genre(s)
2	Para Ti	Lee Ki-chan	R&B
2	Vol. 2 There's So Much I Want To Say	Chu Ga-yeoul	Folk
13	The Wonder Begins	Wonder Girls	K-pop Ballad
14	Vol. 2 – A Sweet Moment	Ivy	K-pop Pop
16	Forever	Jun Jin	K-pop Pop

==== March ====
Date	Title	Artist	Genre(s)
3	Miseongnyeon jabulgama (미성년자불가마)	Norazo	K-pop
3	Lady in Black	Hwangbo	K-pop
5	How Bad Do U Want It?	MC Sniper	Hip hop
6	999.9	Big Mama King	Ballad
13	So Romantic (우리가 알고있는 사랑 이야기 다섯)	As One	K-pop, R&B
15	Farewell & Tonight	Vanilla Unity	Emo rock
19	In My Life	J	R&B, Soul
15	Gobaek Ha Gi Joheun Nal	Younha	K-pop, Pop
22	Brand Wu Year	Masta Wu	Hip hop
29	The First Bloooooming	Kara	K-pop, Pop

=== Second quarter ===
==== April ====
Date	Title	Artist	Genre(s)
6	The Sentimental Chord	SG Wannabe	K-pop Pop
10	Memory Lane	Na Yoon-sun	Jazz
19	《나무로 만든 노래 (Songs Made of Wood)》	Lee Juck	K-pop
19	Oldies But Goodies	The RockTigers	Rockabilly

==== May ====
Date	Title	Artist	Genre(s)
8	One & Only	Nam Hyun-joon	Dance
17	Black Sun	Leessang	K-pop Pop
25	Lovely Sweet Heart	SeeYa	K-pop Pop

==== June ====
Date	Title	Artist	Genre(s)
5	Cheerful Sensibility	F.T. Island	K-pop Pop
7	Love Child of the Century	Clazziquai Project	Electropop
14	Waterfalls	Pia	Alternative rock
14	Woods	Electron Sheep	Folktronica
22	Tension	M. Street	K-pop Ballad
26	The Perfect Day to Say I Love You	Younha	K-pop Pop

=== Third quarter ===
==== July ====
Date	Title	Artist	Genre(s)
5	7DAYZ & Wanted	Wanted, Lee Jung	K-pop Pop
5	Kimdongwan Is	Kim Dong-wan	K-pop
16	Voice of Heaven	Zia	K-pop, Ballad
13	Explore M	Lee Min-woo	K-pop Pop
16	Minastasia	Shim Mina	Dance pop, R&B
24	Yesterday	WoongSan	Jazz

==== August ====
Date	Title	Artist	Genre(s)
2	Into The New World	Girls' Generation	K-pop Pop
16	Always	Big Bang	K-pop Pop
17	Story Of Separation	Lee Seung-gi	K-pop Pop
17	Rux the Ruckus Army	Rux	Punk rock
18	Music for My Life, Life for My Music	Hong Kyung-min	Pop rock
20	Addict 2 Times	Girl Friends	K-pop

==== September ====
Date	Title	Artist	Genre(s)
4	Eternal Essence of Music	Wheesung	K-pop Pop
6	The First	8Eight	K-pop Pop
6	Leave Ms. Kim	Brown Eyed Girls	K-pop Pop
7	The Sixth Miracle	Baek Ji-young	K-pop
12	Set It Down (내려놓음)	Lee Soo-young	K-pop
13	The Wonder Years	Wonder Girls	K-pop Pop
17	Rewind	Cherry Filter	Rock
18	Urban Life Style	Daybreak	Rock
20	Love Letter	Sunny Hill	K-pop Pop
20	Don't Don	Super Junior	K-pop Pop

=== Fourth quarter ===
==== October ====
Date	Title	Artist	Genre(s)
4	Explore M	Lee Min-woo	K-pop Pop
4	Im·pres·sive	Min Kyung-hoon	Ballad
4	Luv Cloud	MayBee	R&B
8	Time Travel	Innovator	Hip hop
18	The Secret of Color 2	Lee Seung-chul	Soft rock, Ballad
22	Money Talks	Cho PD	Hip hop
25	Fly Boy	Supernova	K-pop Pop
25	Soul Family With Johan	Johan Kim	K-pop

==== November ====
Date	Title	Artist	Genre(s)
1	Girls' Generation	Girls' Generation	K-pop Pop
2	The Wind, The Sea, The Rain	Brown Eyed Soul	K-pop, R&B
8	AnyBand	BoA, Kim Junsu, Tablo & Jin Bora	K-pop Pop Pop rock
14	Unfinished Story	Lee Seung-gi	K-pop Pop
22	Hot Issue	Big Bang	K-pop Pop
29	Thank You	Toy	Electronica
30	Infinity	Kim Kyung-ho	Hard rock

==== December ====
Date	Title	Artist	Genre(s)
11	Come To Where I Am	Lena Park	Pop ballad

== Deaths ==
- U;Nee, 25, singer and actress

== See also ==
- 2007 in South Korea
- List of South Korean films of 2007
