= 2003 in South Korean music =

The following is a list of notable events and releases that happened in 2003 in music in South Korea.

== Debuting and disbanded in 2003 ==
=== Debuted groups and sub-units ===
- Big Mama
- Brown Eyed Soul
- Buzz
- Dynamic Duo
- Epik High
- The RockTigers
- S
- Stony Skunk
- Take
- TVXQ

=== Solo debuts ===
- Bada
- Big Mama King
- Koo Jun-yup
- Eugene
- Gummy
- Jeon Hye-bin
- KCM
- Koo Jun-yup
- Lee Hyori
- Lee Jung
- Lee Min-woo
- Lexy
- Masta Wu
- Seven
- Tim
- U;Nee
- WoongSan
- Park Yong-ha

=== Disbanded groups ===
- CB Mass
- Luv
- M.I.L.K.
- Shinvi

== Releases in 2003 ==
=== January ===
Date	Title	Artist	Genre(s)

=== February ===
Date	Title	Artist	Genre(s)
1	Espresso	Delispice	Rock
6	Cowboy	Click-B	K-pop
7	Like the Bible	Big Mama	K-pop
7	Hit Song	NRG	K-pop
7	Like Them	Gummy	R&B, Soul
10	Massappeal	CB Mass	Hip hop
24	Second Time	Kim Ji-hyun	K-pop
25	Foundation (뿌리)	Drunken Tiger	Hip hop
27	Hestory	Kim Gun-mo	K-pop
27	Woo~ Twenty One	Park Ji-yoon	K-pop

=== March ===
Date	Title	Artist	Genre(s)
1	First Tim	Tim	Ballad
10	Mysterium (신비체험)	Lee Tzsche	K-pop
10	A Singer (歌人)	Jo Sung-mo	Pop ballad
7	Just Listen	Se7en	K-pop
14	Never Too Far	As One	K-pop
18	Surprise Party	Cleo	K-pop

=== April ===
Date	Title	Artist	Genre(s)
3	Devotion	Baby Vox	K-pop
4	002 J2	Lee Jai-jin	K-pop
15	Upgrade to No.1	Young Turks Club	Dance-pop
17	1 Story	Take	Dance

=== May ===
Date	Title	Artist	Genre(s)
2	더북 (The Book)	Cha Tae-hyun	Unknown
15	Jadu 3	The Jadu	Rock
15	Intro (초행)	MC Sniper	Hip hop
16	《2적 (2 Juck)》	Lee Juck	K-pop
22	Jae, Gyebal	Leessang	K-pop
22	Emergency (비상 (非常))	Koyote	Hip hop
22	Gray Market	Can	Hard rock
27	Try to Remember	Sung Si-kyung	Pop ballad
30	Atlantis Princess	BoA	K-pop
30	My True Style...	Eugene	K-pop

=== June ===
Date	Title	Artist	Genre(s)
5	Bye	Im Chang-jung	K-pop
12	U;Nee Code	U;Nee	Dance-pop
12	Let it Rain	Nell	Alternative rock
16	Shine	Sugar	K-pop
18	2003 Summer Vacation in SMTown.com	SMTOWN	K-pop
20	Masta Peace	Masta Wu	Hip hop
23	Passion	Lee Jung-hyun	K-pop
24	Come On Let's Go	The RockTigers	Rockabilly
25	Hoony 003	Kang Sung-hoon	K-pop
27	Cats on the Roof OST	Various	OST

=== July ===
Date	Title	Artist	Genre(s)
1	Summer Scent OST	Various	OST
4	Beloved	Jewelry	K-pop
4	8ight	Cool	K-pop
7	Missing You	Fly to the Sky	K-pop
10	Summer Party	Lee Jung-hyun	K-pop
11	Hit For 6ix	Kim Hyun-jung	Dance, R&B
15	Goofy Story	Goofy	K-pop
25	Bodyguard OST	Various	OST
28	Legend	Moon Hee-joon	Rock
29	Friends	Kim Bum-soo	K-pop
31	Love Somebody	Bin	K-pop

=== August ===
Date	Title	Artist	Genre(s)
5	Lee Jung	Lee Jung	K-pop
8	3rd Phase	Pia	Alternative rock
11	Open Your Eyes	Kim Kyung-ho	Hard rock
13	Run Away	jtL	K-pop
13	Stylish...E	Lee Hyori	K-pop
21	This Time	Lee Soo-young	K-pop
21	Sweet & Strong	UN	R&B
21	Tomato	Chakra	K-pop

=== September ===
Date	Title	Artist	Genre(s)
3	The Third Eye	Cherry Filter	Rock
4	Smile	Baek Ji-young	K-pop
5	Drunken in Hip Hop	Eun Jiwon	K-pop
17	Soul Free	Brown Eyed Soul	K-pop, R&B
18	Relation (관계)	Wax	R&B, Ballad
24	Fr.in.Cl.	S	K-pop
29	Natural	Lee Ki-chan	R&B

=== October ===
Date	Title	Artist	Genre(s)
1	남겨둔 이야기 (Maybe)	Dana	K-pop
6	Run Away	Lexy	K-pop
10	Morning of Buzz	Buzz	Pop rock
16	Double Life; The Other Side	Sung Si-kyung	Pop ballad
21	Map of the Human Soul	Epik High	K-pop
21	No More Music	Big Mama King	Ballad
22	A Day of Renew	Bada	K-pop
22	From the Yellow Room	Yiruma	Piano

=== November ===
Date	Title	Artist	Genre(s)
8	The Massive Crush	Crash	Thrash metal
13	Turtles 2	Turtles	Hip hop
22	Un-Touch-Able	Lee Min-woo	K-pop
26	Once N 4 All	1TYM	K-pop

=== December ===
Date	Title	Artist	Genre(s)
2	3rd Story	Jang Na-ra	K-pop
8	2003 Winter Vacation in SMTown.com	SM Town	K-pop
11	Love is Time Sixth Sense	MC the Max	Rock
11	Love Letters	WoongSan	Jazz
12	Down by Love	Na Yoon-sun	Jazz
18	The Third Whisper	Cool	K-pop
23	Stairway to Heaven OST	Various	OST
31	Winter Story	Shinhwa	K-pop

== See also ==
- 2003 in South Korea
- List of South Korean films of 2003
