= 2008 in South Korean music =

The following is a list of notable events and releases that happened in 2008 in music in South Korea.

== Debuting and disbanded in 2008 ==
=== Debuting groups ===
- 2AM
- 2PM
- Davichi
- Guckkasten
- Ibadi
- Mighty Mouth
- Miss S
- Shinee
- Super Junior-H
- U-KISS
- Untouchable
- Winterplay

=== Solo debuts ===
- Ajoo
- Alex Chu
- Basick
- Boram
- Bizniz
- Bizzy
- IU
- Joo
- Jungyup
- Lee Young-yoo
- Park Sae-byul
- Solji

=== Disbanded groups ===
- The Jadu
- Sanulrim
- Stony Skunk
- Turtles

== Releases in 2008 ==
=== First quarter ===
==== January ====
Date	Album	Artist	Genre(s)
2	California Dream	SeeYa	K-pop
10	Women Live Off Love (여자는 사랑을 먹고)	Wax	R&B, Ballad
10	White	Pearl	K-pop, R&B, Hip hop
10	오방간다 (OhBangGanDa)	Turtles	Hip hop
17	With L.O.V.E	Brown Eyed Girls	K-pop
17	Kingdom	KCM	R&B, Ballad
18	Con Asia	Daby Yamamoto	K-pop Dance-pop Hip hop
18	The First New Dream	Andy	K-pop
28	Amaranth	Davichi	K-pop

==== February ====
Date	Album	Artist	Genre(s)
14	M`s The Sentimental Reason	Lee Min-woo	K-pop
14	Another Corner	Ha Dong-kyun	K-pop
14	I've Got A Hottie Little Sister	Sultan of the Disco	Disco
20	Kitchi Island	Jewelry	K-pop
20	The Gift of the Sun	M. Street	K-pop, Ballad
29	Another Story	Kim Kyung-ho	Hard rock

==== March ====
Date	Album	Artist	Genre(s)
12	Eternity	Kangta	K-pop
12	Comfort	Gummy	R&B, Soul
13	Déjà Vu	SS501	K-pop
13	Sunshine	Hwayobi	K-pop, R&B
17	Baby Baby	Girls' Generation	K-pop
21	Separation Anxiety	NELL	K-pop K-rock Indie rock Modern rock
24	When a Man Loves a Woman Vol.2	Lee Seung-gi	K-pop, Ballad

=== Second quarter ===
==== April ====
Date	Album	Artist	Genre(s)
3	Volume 9	Shinhwa	K-pop
3	Sponge Remake 2008 As One	As One	K-pop, R&B
10	Chapter Zero	Kim Kyung-ho	Hard rock
11	U.R.M.S	Paran	K-pop
19	Pieces, Part One	Epik High	Alternative hip hop
24	Happy Network	The Jadu	Rock
25	New Decade	Jun Jin	K-pop
29	Mini Album Vol.1	Son Dam-bi	K-pop Pop, R&B, Dance
29	The First Propose	Andy	K-pop

==== May ====
Date	Album	Artist	Genre(s)
13	The Secret Between Us	Kim Dong-wan	K-pop
22	Replay	Shinee	K-pop
22	Hot	Taeyang	K-pop
26	The Beginning	Gavy NJ	K-pop

==== June ====
Date	Title	Artist	Genre(s)
3	So Hot	Wonder Girls	K-pop
3	Separation Anxiety	Nell	K-rock, Indie rock, Modern rock
5	Cooking? Cooking!	Super Junior-H	K-pop
9	Out of Control	Baechigi	Hip hop
10	Breakdown	Epik High	Alternative hip hop
12	In N Out	Kim Hyun-jung	Dance, R&B
12	Slap Shot	Young Turks Club	Dance-pop
16	Energy	Mighty Mouth	K-pop
19	My Love	J-Walk	K-pop
22	Alive	Kim Kyung-ho	Hard rock

=== Third quarter ===
==== July ====
Date	Album	Artist	Genre(s)
1	D.I.S.C.O	Uhm Jung-hwa	K-pop
1	Keep Going	Hong Kyung-min	Pop rock
3	Shinhwa (White Edition) Volume 9	Shinhwa	K-pop
7	Vivid Summer Edition	Davichi	K-pop
7	Paparazzi	Ajoo	K-pop
10	Singing All My Song For You	Lee Ki-chan	R&B
11	I Believe / Baby Vox	Baby Vox Re.V	K-pop
14	It's Hyorish	Lee Hyori	K-pop
21	This Song	2AM	Ballad
22	Repackage The Secret Between Us	Kim Dong-wan	K-pop
24	Find	SS501	K-pop
25	Rock U	Kara	K-pop
29	Summer Days	Yoo Hee-yeol	Adult contemporary

==== August ====
Date	Album	Artist	Genre(s)
8	Stand Up	Big Bang	K-pop
8	Most Ordinary Existence	Onnine Ibalgwan	Rock
19	Kim Bum Soo Vol. 6	Kim Bum-soo	K-pop
20	Open Fire!	Smash	K-pop
21	Together 4 Ever	Jun Jin	K-pop
25	Colorful Sensibility	F.T. Island	K-pop, Rock
26	Love Child	J	K-pop
26	Live and Let Live	Shin Hye-sung	K-pop
28	Someday	Younha	K-pop
29	The Shinee World	Shinee	K-pop

==== September ====
Date	Album	Artist	Genre(s)
3	New Generation	U-KISS	K-pop
4	Hottest Time of the Day	2PM	K-pop
9	Beautiful, Beautiful!	SSAW	Jazz-rock fusion
16	My Style	Brown Eyed Girls	K-pop
17	Fall in Love	WoongSan	Jazz
18	The Second Mini Album	Son Dam-bi	K-pop, R&B, Dance
22	Voyage	Na Yoon-sun	Jazz
23	Lost and Found	IU	K-pop, R&B, Dance
24	M Rizing	Lee Min-woo	K-pop
24	You Only Love (사랑은 너 하나뿐)	As One, 2NB	K-pop, R&B
26	Mirotic	TVXQ	K-pop, R&B, Dance
26	Brilliant Change	SeeYa	K-pop
30	The Wonder Years: Trilogy	Wonder Girls	K-pop, R&B, Dance
30	Lovescream	Epik High	Alternative hip hop

=== Fourth quarter ===
==== October ====
Date	Album	Artist	Genre(s)
1	Fly Boy	Crown J	K-pop, Hip hop
2	Commonplace	Vanilla Unity	Emo rock
9	Returns	Son Ho-young	K-pop
16	Rainism	Rain	K-pop
17	Colorful Sensibility Part 2	F.T. Island	K-pop, Rock
21	P.N.O.N.I.	Yiruma	Piano
22	Here I am	Kim Jong Kook	K-pop
28	The 10th Anniversary - Variation	Can	Hard rock
29	Amigo	Shinee	K-pop
29	With All My Heart And Soul	Wheesung	K-pop

==== November ====
Date	Album	Artist	Genre(s)
5	Remember	Big Bang	K-pop
6	G Code	Eun Ji-won	K-pop
13	Sensibility	Baek Ji-young	K-pop
17	Family	Mighty Mouth	K-pop
20	Remix Vol.1	Son Dam-bi	K-pop, R&B, Dance
20	Three Go	Norazo	K-pop
28	Here, In My Heart (여기, 내 맘속에)	Sung Si-kyung	Pop ballad
21	U R Man	SS501 Special Project Group	K-pop

==== December ====
Date	Album	Artist	Genre(s)
2	Love 119	K.Will	K-pop,
4	Pretty Girl	Kara	K-pop
9	666 Trilogy Part I	N.EX.T	Heavy metal

== See also ==
- 2008 in South Korea
- List of South Korean films of 2008
