= 2005 in Korea =

2005 in Korea may refer to:

- 2005 in North Korea
- 2005 in South Korea
