= 2003 in Korea =

2003 in Korea may refer to:

- 2003 in North Korea
- 2003 in South Korea
