= 2002 in Korea =

2002 in Korea may refer to:

- 2002 in North Korea
- 2002 in South Korea
