= 2006 in Korea =

2006 in Korea may refer to:

- 2006 in North Korea
- 2006 in South Korea
