= 2007 in Korea =

2007 in Korea may refer to:

- 2007 in North Korea
- 2007 in South Korea
