= 2004 in Korea =

2004 in Korea may refer to:

- 2004 in North Korea
- 2004 in South Korea
