= 2008 in Korea =

2008 in Korea may refer to:

- 2008 in North Korea
- 2008 in South Korea
