= Turn to Dust =

Turn to Dust may refer to:

- "Turn to Dust", a 1996 song by Def Leppard from the album Slang
- "Turn to Dust", a 2003 song by Crash from the album The Massive Crush
- "Turn to Dust", a 2006 song by Freestylers from the album Adventures in Freestyle
- "Turn to Dust", a 2015 song by Wolf Alice from the album My Love Is Cool
- "Turn to Dust", a 2017 song by Europe from the album Walk the Earth
- "Turn to Dust", a 2017 song by Kelela from the album Take Me Apart
- "Turned to Dust", a 2015 song by the Sword from the album High Country
- "Turns to Dust", a storyline in the science fiction comedy webtoon series Live with Yourself!
