= 2007 in South Korea =

- Centuries: 20th; 21st
- Decades: 1980s; 1990s; 2000s; 2010s; 2020s
- See also: Other events in 2007; Years in South Korea; Timeline of Korean history 2007 in North Korea

Events from the year 2007 in South Korea.

== Incumbents ==
- President: Roh Moo-hyun
- Prime Minister:
  - Han Myeong-sook until April 2,
  - Han Duck-soo

=== Governors ===
- Gyeonggi: Kim Moon-soo
- Gangwon: Kim Jin-sun
- North Chungcheong: Chung Woo-taik
- South Chungcheong: Lee Wan-koo
- North Jeolla: Kim Wan-ju
- South Jeolla: Park Jun-young
- North Gyeongsang: Kim Kwan-yong
- South Gyeongsang: Kim Tae-ho
- Jeju: Kim Tae-hwan

== Events ==
- February 7: Manhunt International 2007
- April 2: Han Duck-soo becomes prime minister of South Korea, replacing Han Myeong-sook
- April 16: South Korean expatriate Seung-Hui Cho murders 32 people at Virginia Tech in the U.S.
- June 30: The free trade agreement between the United States and South Korea is signed.
- July 19: South Korean citizens in Afghanistan are taken hostage by terrorists.
- July 27: The South Korean pledge of allegiance, the word minjok (lit. "Korean nation" or "Korean ethnicity") was removed and replaced with "Republic of Korea".
- August 17: Jellyfish Entertainment is founded.
- November 17: 2007 Mnet Asian Music Awards
- December 7: 2007 South Korea oil spill
- December 19: 2007 South Korean presidential election
- BBK stock price manipulation incident

== Sport ==
- 2007 in South Korean football
- 2007 Korea Professional Baseball season
- South Korea at the 2007 Asian Indoor Games
- South Korea at the 2007 Asian Winter Games
- South Korea at the 2007 World Championships in Athletics
- South Korea at the 2007 UCI Road World Championships
- 2007 Korea Open Super Series
- 2007 Asian Canoe Sprint Championships
- 2007 FIBA Asia Championship for Women

== Film ==
- List of South Korean films of 2007
- List of 2007 box office number-one films in South Korea
- 28th Blue Dragon Film Awards
- 44th Grand Bell Awards

== Television ==
- 1st Korea Drama Awards
- 2007 KBS Drama Awards
- 2007 MBC Drama Awards
- The first SBS Entertainment Awards ceremony.

== Deaths ==
- January 1 - Hong Seon-min, actor
- January 10 - Kim Hyung-eun
- January 21 - U;Nee, singer, rapper, dancer and actress (b. 1981), suicide
- February 2 - Oh Kyu-won
- February 10 - Jeong Da-bin, actress (b. 1980), suicide
- July 13 - Min Bok-ki,former chief justice of the Supreme Court
- August 12 - Kim Joo-seung, actor
- May 17 - Kwon Jeong-Saeng, children's book witer
- May 25 - Pi Chun-deuk, writer and poet.
- November 25 - Ha Geun-chan, writer

== See also ==
- 2007 in South Korean music
