= Jeong Sang-jin =

- Hangul: 정상진
- RR: Jeong Sangjin
- MR: Chŏng Sangjin

Jeong Sang-jin (Korean: 정상진) may refer to:

- Chŏng Sangjin (1918–2013) – Soviet Korean soldier
- Jeong Sang-jin (baseball player) (born 1964) – South Korean athlete
- Jeong Sang-jin (born 1978), perpetrator of the 2008 Nonhyeon-dong massacre
- Jung Sang-jin (javelin thrower) (born 1984) – South Korean athlete
