= 2007 in North Korea =

- Centuries: 20th; 21st
- Decades: 1980s; 1990s; 2000s; 2010s; 2020s
- See also: Other events of 2007; Years in North Korea; Timeline of Korean history 2007 in South Korea

Events from the year 2007 in North Korea.

== Incumbents ==
- Premier: Pak Pong-ju (until 11 April), Kim Yong-il (starting 11 April)
- Supreme Leader: Kim Jong-il

== Events ==
- 2007 North Korean local elections
- 2007 North Korean floods
- Dai Hong Dan incident

== Births ==
- 1 January – Choe Il-son, footballer
- 7 January – Ri Su-jong, footballer
- 11 January – Hong Son-gyong, footballer
- 20 January – Jong Pok-yong, footballer
- 28 February – Ho Kyong, footballer
- 3 March – Ri Pom, footballer
- 12 March – Jon Il-chong, footballer
- 7 April – Jo Un-bom, footballer

== Deaths ==
- 2 January – Paek Nam-sun, 6th Minister of Foreign Affairs (b. 1929).
- 16 June – Ri In-mo, unconverted long-term prisoner and songwriter (b. 1917).
