= The Paragon of Animals =

Studio album by Crash
- Released: August 10, 2010
- Genre: Industrial metal Groove metal Thrash metal
- Label: CJ E&M Music; CMCC-9579

Crash chronology
The Massive Crush (2003)	The Paragon of Animals (2010)

The Paragon of Animals is the 6th album produced by South Korean thrash metal band Crash, released on iTunes on August 10, 2010. A music video was filmed for lead-off track "Crashday" and is available to watch on YouTube.

== Track listing ==
1. Crashday 5:00
2. Ruination Effect 5:31
3. Misguided Criminals 4:56
4. Revolver 5:21
5. Cold Blooded 5:17
6. Redlambs 5:38
7. Creeping I Am 5:05
8. Atheist 4:01
9. Lucid Sycophant 4:20
10. The New Black 6:59
11. Fierce People 3:52
