= 2008 in South Korea =

- Centuries: 20th; 21st
- Decades: 1980s; 1990s; 2000s; 2010s; 2020s
- See also: Years in South Korea; Timeline of Korean history 2008 in North Korea

Events in the year 2008 in South Korea.

== Incumbents ==
- President:
  - Roh Moo-hyun (until February 25),
  - Lee Myung-bak (starting February 25)
- Prime Minister:
  - Han Myeong-sook (until 29 February),
  - Han Seung-soo (starting 29 February)

=== Governors ===
- Gyeonggi: Kim Moon-soo
- Gangwon: Kim Jin-sun
- North Chungcheong: Chung Woo-taik
- South Chungcheong: Lee Wan-koo
- North Jeolla: Kim Wan-ju
- South Jeolla: Park Jun-young
- North Gyeongsang: Kim Kwan-yong
- South Gyeongsang: Kim Tae-ho
- Jeju: Kim Tae-hwan

== Events ==
- 2008 Grand National Party Convention bribery incident

=== February ===
- 2008 Namdaemun fire broke out on February 10.

=== March ===
- 2008 Asian Wrestling Championships were held in Jeju City from March 18 to 23.

=== April ===
- 2008 Asian Judo Championships were held from April 26 to 27. South Korea had two gold medalists, six silver medalists, and 4 Bronze medalists.

=== May ===
- 24: 2008 US beef protest in South Korea

=== July ===
- 52nd Miss Korea 2008 was a beauty pageant. It was held on July 8, 2008 at Sejong Center.

=== August ===
- South Korea competed in the 2008 Summer Olympics in August. The country had participants that won a total of 31 medals.

=== October ===
- South Korea participated in the 2008 Asian Beach Games, which took place from October 8 to 26.
- October 28: Nonhyeon-dong massacre

=== November ===
- 15: 2008 Mnet Asian Music Awards

=== December ===
- Nayoung Case
- The 23rd Golden Disk Awards were held December 10, 2008. They recognized accomplishments by musicians from the previous year.
- December 13: The first China–Japan–South Korea trilateral summit is held in Fukuoka, Japan.
- December 25: The finalists of the Korean Astronaut Program are selected.

== Films ==
- List of 2008 box office number-one films in South Korea
- 29th Blue Dragon Film Awards
- 45th Grand Bell Awards

== Television ==
- 2008 MBC Drama Awards
- 2008 SBS Drama Awards
- 2008 KBS Drama Awards
- 2nd Korea Drama Awards

== Sport ==
- 2008 in South Korean football

== Births ==
- 11 November – Lee Hyo-song, professional golfer

== See also ==
- 2008 in South Korean music
- South Korea at the 2008 Summer Paralympics
- 2008 US beef protest in South Korea
- China–Japan–South Korea trilateral summit
