= Ha Sebin =

South Korean musician (born 1983)

Ha Sebin 하세빈
- Born: 10 January 1983 (age 43); South Korea
- Genres: Rock
- Occupations: Instrumentalist, songwriter, composer, record producer
- Instruments: Guitar, piano
- Labels: Sony BMG, EMI Music Korea
- Member of: Nemesis (네미시스)
- Formerly of: EVE (이브)
- Website: Cyworld Homepage (Korean)

Ha Sebin (Korean: 하세빈) is a South Korean musician. He is the leader and lead guitarist of rock band Nemesis, and joined EVE as a guitarist in 2003. He has composed and arranged for both bands and produced Nemesis' debut album la Rose de Versailles. He also wrote all the music for the OST of the MBC drama miniseries 도로시를 찾아라.

Ha Sebin's music style is a post-modern mix of classical music and modern rock styles. He majored in post-modern music while at Kyunghee University, and plays the piano, guitar, as well as some other unidentified string instrument(s).

== Discography ==
=== Nemesis ===
- 2002: Nemesis (demo album)
- 2004: Nemesis – Fragmented Love (조각사랑) – (digital single)
- 2005: Nemesis – la Rose de Versailles
- 2009: Nemesis vol.2 – Lovesick

=== EVE ===
- 2003: Welcome to Planet EVE
- 2004: The History of EVE
- 2004: The History of EVE DVD
- 2006: sEVEnth evening

=== Solo projects ===
==== OST ====
- 2006: Finding Dorothy (도로시를 찾아라) OST
