= Rendezvous (Mina album) =

Studio album by Shim Mina
- Released: November 7, 2002
- Recorded: 2002
- Genre: Pop; R&B
- Length: 36:17
- Language: Korean
- Label: J-Entercom

Shim Mina chronology
Rendezvous (2002)	Re:Turn 2 Mina (2004)

Singles from Rendezvous
- 1. "Answer the Phone" Released: November 7, 2002; 2. "Dreams Shall Come True" Released: November 7, 2002

Rendezvous is the debut studio album by South Korean recording artist Shim Mina. It was released by J-Entercom Entertainment on November 7, 2002. The album spawned the single "Answer the Phone", which is a remake of the 2001 song of the same name by South Korean trio Kiss.

== Background and release ==
Shim Mina initially attracted attention as "Miss World Cup" following her Red Devils cheering attire during the 2002 FIFA World Cup. She gained attention as a singer with her rendition of "Answer the Phone", a remake of a 2001 song of the same name by the South Korean trio Kiss. The original plan was for Kiss to release "Answer the Phone" as a sequel to their debut single "Because I'm a Woman" from their first album, Kiss First Album. However, this plan was abandoned due to the group's disbandment five months after their debut.

"Dreams Shall Come True" was released as the second single from the album.

== Reception ==
Although Rendezvous was not commercially successful in South Korea, it saw success in China and the Philippines. The album reportedly sold about 200,000 copies in China, while "Answer the Phone" was frequently played as background music in nightclubs in China and the Philippines.

== Covers ==
Sandara Park, a member of girl group 2NE1, released a version of Mina's "Answer the Phone" while based in the Philippines.

== Track listing ==
Rendezvous track listing
No.	Title	Length
1.	"Intro"	0:40
2.	"What's Going On" (일났어)	3:17
3.	"Answer the Phone" (전화 받어)	3:09
4.	"Dreams Shall Come True" (꿈은 이루어진다)	3:55
5.	"7 Day a Week" (월화수목금토일)	3:49
6.	"Middletro"	0:42
7.	"Butterfly" (버터플라이)	3:14
8.	"Somebody Watching" (누가 봐)	3:15
9.	"This is My Way" (내 멋대로 하겠어)	3:42
10.	"Questions" (문제야)	3:29
11.	"Coincidence" (우연)	3:54
12.	"Answer the Phone" (Old School Mix)	3:11
Total length:		36:17

== Sales ==
Region	Certification	Certified units/sales
China	—	200,000
