= Touché Mon Amour =

Studio album by Winterplay
- Released: September 4, 2010
- Recorded: 2010
- Genres: jazz, pop jazz
- Languages: Korean, English
- Label: Fluxus

Winterplay chronology
Hot Summerplay (2009)	Touché Mon Amour (2010)	Just This Christmas (2012)

Touché Mon Amour is the second studio album by Korean jazz project Winterplay, released on September 4, 2010, in Korea. The album contains thirteen songs by Winterplay. The vocalist on all tracks is Haewon Moon.

== Music videos ==
Year	Music video	Length	Album	Official MV on YouTube
2010	"Touché Mon Amour"	3:02	Studio 2nd Album "Touché Mon Amour"	Winterplay on YouTube

== Track listing ==
No.	Title	Lyrics	Music	Arrangement	Length
1.	"Songs of Colored Love"	Juhan Lee	Mori Masaki, Nakano Yoshie		4:15
2.	"Your Eyes"	SAZA Woo-jun Choi	Juhan Lee	Haewon, Eun-kyu So, Juhan Lee, SAZA Woo-jun Choi	3:46
3.	"Touché Mon Amour"	Juhan Lee, SAZA Woo-jun Choi	Juhan Lee	Haewon, Eun-kyu So, Juhan Lee, SAZA Woo-jun Choi	3:42
4.	"Moon Over Bourbon Street"				3:18
5.	"Hey Bob" (Rejazzed)	Juhan Lee	Juhan Lee	Haewon, Eun-kyu So, Juhan Lee, SAZA Woo-jun Choi	3:36
6.	"June Ballad"	Juhan Lee	Juhan Lee	Haewon, Eun-kyu So, Juhan Lee, SAZA Woo-jun Choi	3:54
7.	"Those Darn Feelings"	Juhan Lee	Juhan Lee	Haewon, Eun-kyu So, Juhan Lee, SAZA Woo-jun Choi	3:23
8.	"I Need to be in Love"	John Bettis	John Bettis, Albert Hammond, Richard Carpenter		4:14
9.	"눈 내리던 어느 날" (Snowy Day)	SAZA Woo-jun Choi	SAZA Woo-jun Choi	Haewon, Eun-kyu So, Juhan Lee, SAZA Woo-jun Choi	3:56
10.	"Don't Know Why"	Jesse Harris	Jesse Harris		3:10
11.	"세월이 가면" (Time Goes by)	Myung-Seob Choi	Ho-Seob Choi		3:41
12.	"Shout"	Juhan Lee	Juhan Lee	Haewon, Eun-kyu So, Juhan Lee, SAZA Woo-jun Choi	3:14
13.	"Blue Without You"	Juhan Lee	Juhan Lee	Haewon, Eun-kyu So, Juhan Lee, SAZA Woo-jun Choi	4:28
Total length:					48:33
