= 2006 in South Korea =

- Centuries: 20th; 21st
- Decades: 1980s; 1990s; 2000s; 2010s; 2020s
- See also: Other events in 2006; Years in South Korea; Timeline of Korean history 2006 in North Korea

Events from the year 2006 in South Korea.

== Incumbents ==
- President: Roh Moo-hyun
- Prime Minister:
  - Lee Hae-chan (until 14 March),
  - Han Myeong-sook (starting 14 March)

=== Governors ===
- Gyeonggi: Kim Moon-soo
- Gangwon: Kim Jin-sun
- North Chungcheong: Chung Woo-taik
- South Chungcheong: Lee Wan-koo
- North Jeolla: Kim Wan-ju
- South Jeolla: Park Jun-young
- North Gyeongsang: Kim Kwan-yong
- South Gyeongsang: Kim Tae-ho
- Jeju: Kim Tae-hwan

== Events ==
- 1-4 March : 2006 South Korean railroad strike: Members of the Korean Railway Workers' Union stage a four-day walkout, in protest against the replacement of permanent positions with short-term contracts.
- April: The Saemangeum Seawall is completed.
- 20 April: Han Myeong-sook becomes prime minister of South Korea, replacing Lee Hae-chan.
- 12 May: The Korean Paralympic Committee is founded.
- 31 May: 2006 South Korean local elections
- August: Approximately 900 conscientious objectors, mostly Jehovah’s Witnesses, are imprisoned for refusing mandatory military service.
- August: Actors Lee Min-ho and Jung Il-Woo survive a near-fatal car accident.
- September: Hwang Kwang-min is given a suspended two-year prison sentence under the National Security Act, for producing and distributing pro-North Korea materials.
- October: First Nuclear Test

== Sport ==
- South Korea at the 2006 Winter Olympics
- South Korea at the 2006 Winter Paralympics
- South Korea at the 2006 Asian Games
- 2006 BWF World Junior Championships
- 2006 World Junior Curling Championships
- 2006 Korea Open
- 2006 in South Korean football
- 2006 Peace Queen Cup
- 2006 AFC Women's Asian Cup

== Film ==
- List of South Korean films of 2006
- List of 2006 box office number-one films in South Korea
- 26th Blue Dragon Film Awards

== Births ==
- January 27 - Kim Su-an, actress
- March 12 - Lee Re, actress
- March 21 - Kim Myung-jun, footballer
- April 16 - Yang Min-hyuk, footballer
- May 15 - Kang Haerin, member of group NewJeans
- May 26 - Kyujin, singer
- June 23 - Lee Chae-mi, actress
- August 14 - Kal So-won, actress
- November 10 - Hong Eun-chae, singer

== Deaths ==
- March 11 - Kim Hyung-gon, comedian
- April 11 - Shin Sang-ok, filmmaker
- October 22 - Choi Kyu-hah, politician
- December - Kim Hyung-chil, horse rider

== See also ==
- 2006 in South Korean music
