= 2003 in South Korea =

- Centuries: 20th; 21st
- Decades: 1980s; 1990s; 2000s; 2010s; 2020s
- See also: Other events in 2003; Years in South Korea; Timeline of Korean history 2003 in North Korea

Events from the year 2003 in South Korea.

== Incumbents ==
- President:
  - Kim Dae-jung (until 24 February),
  - Roh Moo-hyun (starting 24 February)
- Prime Minister:
  - Kim Suk-soo (until 26 February),
  - Goh Kun (starting 26 February)

=== Governors ===
- Gyeonggi: Sohn Hak-kyu
- Gangwon: Kim Jin-sun
- North Chungcheong: Lee Won-jong
- South Chungcheong: Sim Dae-pyung
- North Jeolla: Kang Hyun-wook
- South Jeolla: Park Tae-young
- North Gyeongsang: Lee Eui-geun
- South Gyeongsang: Kim Hyuk-kyu
- Jeju: Woo Geun-min

== Events ==
- January 11: DPRK withdraws from the NPT (Non-Proliferation of Nuclear Weapons deal) rising nuclear tensions between the nations
- February 18: Daegu subway fire: 192 people die when an arsonist sets fire to a subway train.
- February 26: Goh Kun becomes prime minister of South Korea, replacing Kim Suk-soo
- May 10: The Seoul National University Bundang Hospital begins its first treatment.
- September 12: Typhoon Maemi
- November 27: 2003 Mnet Asian Music Awards
- December: The Face Shop is founded.

== Sports ==
- The Korea National League is founded.
- 2003 Asian Judo Championships held in Jeju City
- 2003 Asian Cycling Championships
- 2003 Summer Universiade
- South Korea at the 2003 Asian Winter Games
- World Cyber Games 2003
- 2003 K League
- 2003 K2 League
- 2003 Korean FA Cup
- 2003 Peace Cup

== Film ==
- List of South Korean films of 2003

== Births ==
- January 8 - Lee Ji-han, footballer
- January 8 - Seo Da-hyun, singer
- January 23 - Kim Ye-lim, figure skater
- February 4 - Lee Jae-hyeon, baseball player
- February 7 - Lee Hyun-ju, footballer
- February 13 - Kim Jin-young, actress
- February 26 - Eom Do-hyun, artistic gymnast
- February 26 - Lim Eun-soo, figure skater
- March 4 - Park Sa-rang, actress
- March 5 - Lee Yun-seo, artistic gymnast
- March 6 - Lee Seung-won, footballer
- March 12 - Park Hye-jeong, weightlifter
- March 15 - Ku Yeon-woo, tennis player
- March 26 - Kang Seong-jin, footballer
- April 8 - Jin Yong, badminton player
- April 17 - Hwang You-min, golfer
- April 30 - Jung Yoon-seok, actor
- May 7 - Seokju Hong, footballer
- May 9 - Lee Tae-min, footballer
- May 13 - Seong Seung-min, modern pentathlete
- May 20 - Jeon Min-seo, actress
- May 20 - Kim Yong-hak, footballer
- May 20 - Yang Ji-in, sport shooter
- May 21 - Hwang Sun-woo, swimmer
- May 21 - Jeong Bo-young, tennis player
- May 23 - Lee Young-jun, footballer
- June 2 - Big Naughty, rapper
- June 2 - Wang Seok-hyeon, actor
- June 3 - Kim Jun-hong, footballer
- June 13 - Lim Si-hyeon, archer
- June 25 - Sara Choi, para-alpine skier
- July 4 - Kim Hyo-ki, footballer
- July 8 - Lee Suk-jae, footballer
- July 10 - Jo Jin-ho, footballer
- July 11 - Swan, singer
- July 22 - Jeon Jun-hyeok, actor
- August 6 - Yoon Seo-yeon, singer and actress
- August 11 - To Ji-hun, figure skater
- August 13 - Tang Jun-sang, Korean-Malaysian actor
- August 17 - Yang Han-yeol, actor
- August 21 - Bae Jun-ho, footballer
- September 1 - An Yu-jin, singer
- September 18 - Lee Da-yeon, actress
- September 24 - Cha Young-hyun, figure skater
- October 2 - Kim Do-yeong, baseball player
- October 2 - Seunghan, singer
- October 11 - Park Yeong-hyun, baseball player
- November 1 - Seo Chae-hyun, rock climber
- November 7 - Park Ji-hu, actress
- December 4 - Kim Do-ah, entertainer
- December 20 - Seo Geon-woo, taekwondo athlete
- December 23 - Moon Dong-ju, baseball player

== See also ==
- 2003 in South Korean music
