= Two Fabulous Fools =

Studio album by Winterplay
- Released: July 17, 2013
- Recorded: 2013
- Genre: jazz, pop jazz, Bossa Nova
- Language: Korean, English
- Label: KT Music

Winterplay chronology
Just This Christmas (2012)	Two Fabulous Fools (2013)	42nd Summerplay (2014)

Two Fabulous Fools is the third studio album by Korean jazz band Winterplay, first released on July 17, 2013, in Korea. It was released in China, Hong Kong, Makau, and Taiwan after Winterplay signed a contract with Universal Music. The album contains ten songs by Winterplay. The vocalist on all tracks is Haewon Moon.

== Commercial performance ==
The song, "Shake It Up and Down", first ranked on international play chart in the best Hong Kong pop music chart, Commercial Radio. The album ranked number one on Hong Kong HMV jazz chart and number two on Hong Kong record Classic Chart.

== Music videos ==
Year	Music video	Length	Album	Official MV on YouTube
2013	"Yoboseyo Baby"	3:02	Studio 3rd Album "Two Fabulous Fools"	Winterplay on YouTube

== Track listing ==
No.	Title	Lyrics	Music	Arrangement	Length
1.	"Shake It Up and Down"	Haewon, Juhan Lee	Juhan Lee	Juhan Lee	3:37
2.	"Complicated You And Me" (Feat. Jang Yoon-ju)	Kyung-il Kwak, Juhan Lee	Juhan Lee	Juhan Lee	3:42
3.	"Be my Baby"	Jeff Barry, Philip Spector, Ellie Greenwich	Jeff Barry, Philip Spector, Ellie Greenwich	Juhan Lee	3:06
4.	"As Tears Go By"	Mick Jagger, Andrew Loog Oldham, Keith Richards	Mick Jagger, Andrew Loog Oldham, Keith Richards	Juhan Lee	3:56
5.	"Pure Heart"	Juhan Lee	Juhan Lee	Juhan Lee	4:42
6.	"노란 샤쓰의 사나이"	Seok-woo Son	Seok-woo Son	Juhan Lee	2:59
7.	"So Much For Love"	Juhan Lee	Juhan Lee	Juhan Lee	3:12
8.	"Yoboseyo Baby" (title)	Juhan Lee, Hye-young Jung	Juhan Lee	Juhan Lee	3:04
9.	"Puppy Love" (Snowy Day)	Juhan Lee	Juhan Lee	Juhan Lee	4:17
10.	"Last Song"	Haewon	Juhan Lee	Juhan Lee	4:00
Total length:					36:35
