= Kwon Jeong-saeng =

South Korean writer

- Born: September 10, 1937; Tokyo, Japan
- Died: May 17, 2007 (aged 69)
- Writing career
- Language: Korean

Korean name
- Hangul: 권정생
- Hanja: 權正生
- RR: Gwon Jeongsaeng
- MR: Kwŏn Chŏngsaeng

Kwon Jeong-saeng (Korean: 권정생; September 10, 1937 – May 17, 2007) was a South Korean writer.

== Life ==
Kwon Jeong-saeng was born Kwon Gyeongsu in Tokyo, Japan in 1937. Shortly after the Liberation in 1946, he returned to Korea. Because he was extremely poor, Kwon never received a formal education, instead traveling Korea while working as a clerk, and sometimes resorting to betting to support himself. In 1967 Kwon settled in Andong, Gyeongsangbuk-do as a church caretaker. His first publication, “Puppy Poo” (강아지 똥, Gangaji ttong) appeared in 1969 in Christian Education (기독교 교육, Gidokgyo gyoyuk); in 1971, his story “Lamb’s Shadow Ttallangi” (아기 양의 그림자 딸랑이, Agiyangui geurimja ttallangi) was chosen as one of the winners of a spring literary contest sponsored by Daegu Maeil Sinmun, and in 1973, “Mommy and Cotton Jacket” (무명 저고리와 엄마, Mumyeong jeogoriwa eomma) was selected by Chosun Ilbo for its literary contest.

Kwon fell ill in his later years, and made a will that left all of his royalties to charities, including some in North Korea, Asia, and Africa. He also requested that his cottage be destroyed, or left to nature, and wanted his body cremated and spread on the mountains behind his home.

== Work ==
The Literature Translation Institute of Korea summarizes Kown's work:

Kwon’s own experience growing up as a son of a Korean laborer in Japan during the colonial period heavily influenced his literary imagination. However, while Kwon offers a fresh insight into the pain and sorrows of the common people caught in the turbulent period of Korea’s industrialization, he does not fail to discover a note of hope and power of resilience behind these dark lives. In his works, Kwon attempts to give an expression to the love he feels for all living things, for the people who retain a sense of hope even in hardship. Borrowing the perspective of children, Kwon is able to discover the truth and the innocence of life untainted by ideological concerns or social structures.

In 1996, Kwon's work "Puppy Poo" was turned into a successful children's picture book.

== Awards ==
- 1995 New Bud Literary Award
- 1975 Korean Children's Literature Award
- 1969 Christian Children's Literature Award

== Works in Korean (Partial) ==
Children's books

- Hantijae Sky (Hantijae haneul
- Jeomdeuk's House (Jeomdeugi nae
- Sister Mongsil (Mongsil eonni
- God's Tears (Haneunimui nunmul
- Seaside Children (Badatga aideul
- The Moon in Apple Orchard (Sagwanamubat dallim
- Black Boa Train (Meokgureongi gicha
- Moon World Ttolbae Has Seen (Ttolbaega bogo on dallara
- Traditional Tales for North and South Korean Children (Nambuk eoriniga hamkkae boneun jeollae donghwa

Essays

- Our God (Urideurui haneunim
- For the Youthful Wanderer (Cheongchun nageunaereul wihayeo.
