= 2004 in South Korea =

- Centuries: 20th; 21st
- Decades: 1980s; 1990s; 2000s; 2010s; 2020s
- See also: Other events in 2004; Years in South Korea; Timeline of Korean history 2004 in North Korea

Events from the year 2004 in South Korea.

== Incumbents ==
- President: Roh Moo-hyun
- Prime Minister:
  - Goh Kun (until 25 May),
  - Lee Hae-chan (starting 30 May)

=== Governors ===
- Gyeonggi: Sohn Hak-kyu
- Gangwon: Kim Jin-sun
- North Chungcheong: Lee Won-jong
- South Chungcheong: Sim Dae-pyung
- North Jeolla: Kang Hyun-wook
- South Jeolla: Park Jun-young
- North Gyeongsang: Lee Eui-geun
- South Gyeongsang: Kim Tae-ho
- Jeju: Kim Tae-hwan

== Events ==
- The organization Korean Lawyers for Public Interest and Human Rights is founded.
- April 15: 2004 South Korean legislative election
- June 1 The National Emergency Management Agency is formed.
- June 4: 41st Grand Bell Awards
- November 16: Love Land is opened.
- December: Online newspaper Daily NK is founded.
- December 4: 2004 Mnet Asian Music Awards
- Miryang gang rape

== Sport ==
- South Korea at the 2004 Summer Olympics
- South Korea at the 2004 Summer Paralympics
- 2004 Asian Taekwondo Championships
- 2004 World Single Distance Speed Skating Championships
- 2004 K League
- 2004 K2 League
- 2004 Korean FA Cup
- 2004 Korean League Cup
- 2004 South Korea national football team season

== Film ==
- List of South Korean films of 2004

== Births ==
- January 4 - Kim Joo-ah, actress
- January 5 - Ahn Ji-ho, actor
- January 12 - Ahn Seo-hyun, actress
- January 31 - Zeus, gamer
- February 6 - Lee Jae-in, actress
- February 13 - Ryu Han-bi, actress
- March 5 - Choi Soo-in, actress
- March 9 - Yoo Eun-mi, actress
- March 20 - Belle, singer
- March 20 - Yunchan Lim, pianist
- March 29 - Kim Ju-chan, footballer
- April 9 - Kim Su-jung, former actress
- April 12 - Kim Je-deok, archer
- April 16 - Jini, singer
- May 3 - Kim Shin-ji, footballer
- May 7 - Minji, singer and dancer
- May 27 - You Young, figure skater
- May 31 - Kang Sang-yoon, footballer
- July 1 - Kim Gil-li, short track speed skater
- July 5 - Shin Yu-bin, table tennis player
- July 14 - Shin Sol-yi, artistic gymnast
- July 18 - Choi Woo-jin, footballer
- July 21 - Trade L, rapper
- July 26 - Jung Joon-won, actor
- August 13 - Lee Chae-eun, actress
- August 31 - Jang Won-young, singer
- September 24 - Bang Shin-sil, golfer
- October 5 - Choi Kwon-soo, actor
- October 5 - Oh Ye-ju, actress
- October 11 - Jang Seok-hwan, footballer
- November 29 - Shin Soo-yeon, actress
- December 4 - Kim Chae-yeon, singer
- December 7 - Bae Ye-bin, footballer
- December 11 - Lee Eugene, actor
- December 24 - Kim Ji-soo, footballer
- December 28 - Lee Da-yeong, artistic gymnast

== Deaths ==
- June 22 - Kim Sun-il.

== See also ==
- 2004 in South Korean music
