= Classic Odyssey =

Studio album by SG Wannabe
- Released: September 16, 2005
- Genre: K-pop
- Language: Korean
- Label: Mnet Media
- Producers: Cho Young-chul, Lee Min-soo

SG Wannabe chronology
Saldaga (2005)	Classic Odyssey (2005)	The 3rd Masterpiece (2006)

Singles from SG Wannabe
- 1. "My Heart's Treasure Chest" Released: September 16, 2005

Classic Odyssey is the 2.5 studio album by SG Wannabe. It is said that a 1 billion won (₩1,000,000,000) budget went into SG Wannabe's new remake album. It included hits such as "My Heart's Treasure Box" (내 마음의 보석상자).

At the end of 2005, SG Wannabe was ranked at #1, with over 400,000 copies sold of their 2nd album, Saldaga, and 12th, with 147,047 copies sold of their remake album on the year-end chart.

== Track listing ==
No.	Title	Lyrics	Music	Arrangements	Length
1.	"내 마음의 보석상자" ("My Heart's Treasure Chest")	Lee Ju Ho	Lee Ju Ho	Cho Young Soo
2.	"비 오는 거리" ("The Rainy Street")
3.	"꿈의 대화 (R&B Soul Version)" ("A Dreamy Conversation")	Lee Bum Yong	Lee Bum Yong	Cho Young Soo
4.	"사랑의 썰물" ("Tide of Love")	Kim Chang Gi	Kim Chang Gi	Cho Young Soo
5.	"유리창엔 비" ("The Rain On The Window", duet with "Ock Ju-hyun")
6.	"소녀" ("Young Girl")	Lee Jung Han	Lee Jung Han
7.	"이별 아닌 이별" ("A Separation Which Wasn't One")	Oh Tae Ho	Oh Tae Ho	Kim Tae Hyun (mdrdney)
8.	"사랑과 우정사이" ("Between Love and Friendship")	Oh Tae Ho	Oh Tae Ho	Seo Jae Ha
9.	"비 오는 날의 수채화" ("Art On A Rainy Day")	Kang In Won	Kang In Won	Cho Young Soo
10.	"눈물나는 날에는" ("On The Days I Cry")	Yoo Young Seok	Yoo Young Seok
11.	"혜화동" ("Anger East")
12.	"종이학" ("Paper Crane")	Lee Gun Woo	Lee Bum Hee
13.	"가을사랑" ("Autumn Love")	Min Jae Hong	Min Jae Hong
14.	"단발머리" ("Short Hair")
15.	"내 마음의 보석상자 (Music Video Edit Version)" ("My Heart's Treasure Chest")	Lee Ju Ho	Lee Ju Ho	Cho Young Soo
16.	"꿈의 대화 (Acoustic Version)" ("Dreamy Conversation")	Lee Bum Yong	Lee Bum Yong	Cho Young Soo
