= 2006 in North Korea =

- Centuries: 20th; 21st
- Decades: 1980s; 1990s; 2000s; 2010s; 2020s
- See also: Other events of 2006; Years in North Korea; Timeline of Korean history 2006 in South Korea

Events from the year 2006 in North Korea.

== Incumbents ==
- Premier: Pak Pong-ju
- Supreme Leader: Kim Jong-il

== Events ==
- 2006 North Korean nuclear test
- 2006 North Korean missile test

== Deaths ==
- 27 June – O Mi-ran, actress (b. 1954).
- 6 September – Chon Hyong-kyu, KCTV news anchor (b. 1934).
- 5 October – Paek Hak-rim, former Minister of Social Security (b. 1918).
- 23 November – Kye Ung-thae, former Vice Premier of North Korea (b. 1925).
