= Kim Hyung-gon =

South Korean comedian

Kim Hyung-gon (Korean: 김형곤; May 31, 1960 – March 11, 2006) was one of the most influential and famous comedians by the time of his death in South Korea. He debuted in 1980, and enjoyed success since then. His comedy routine depicted political figures and corruptions during the time when free speech and other human rights were denied in South Korea. He was also known for making phrase "잘 돼야 할 텐데" a hit during the 1990s.Kim also had a nickname called "Samgyeopsal of terror."

== Life ==
Kim was born in Yeongcheon, and as his father was a soldier, he had to move schools multiple times. He participated in a fight for democracy and debuted as a comedian in 1980 at the Tongyang Broadcasting Company comedy contest. Kim was popular for the comedy sketch "Biryong group", which satirized the figures from the fifth republic.

== Death ==
Kim died of a heart attack in a local gym in 2006.
