= Crash (South Korean band) =

South Korean thrash metal band

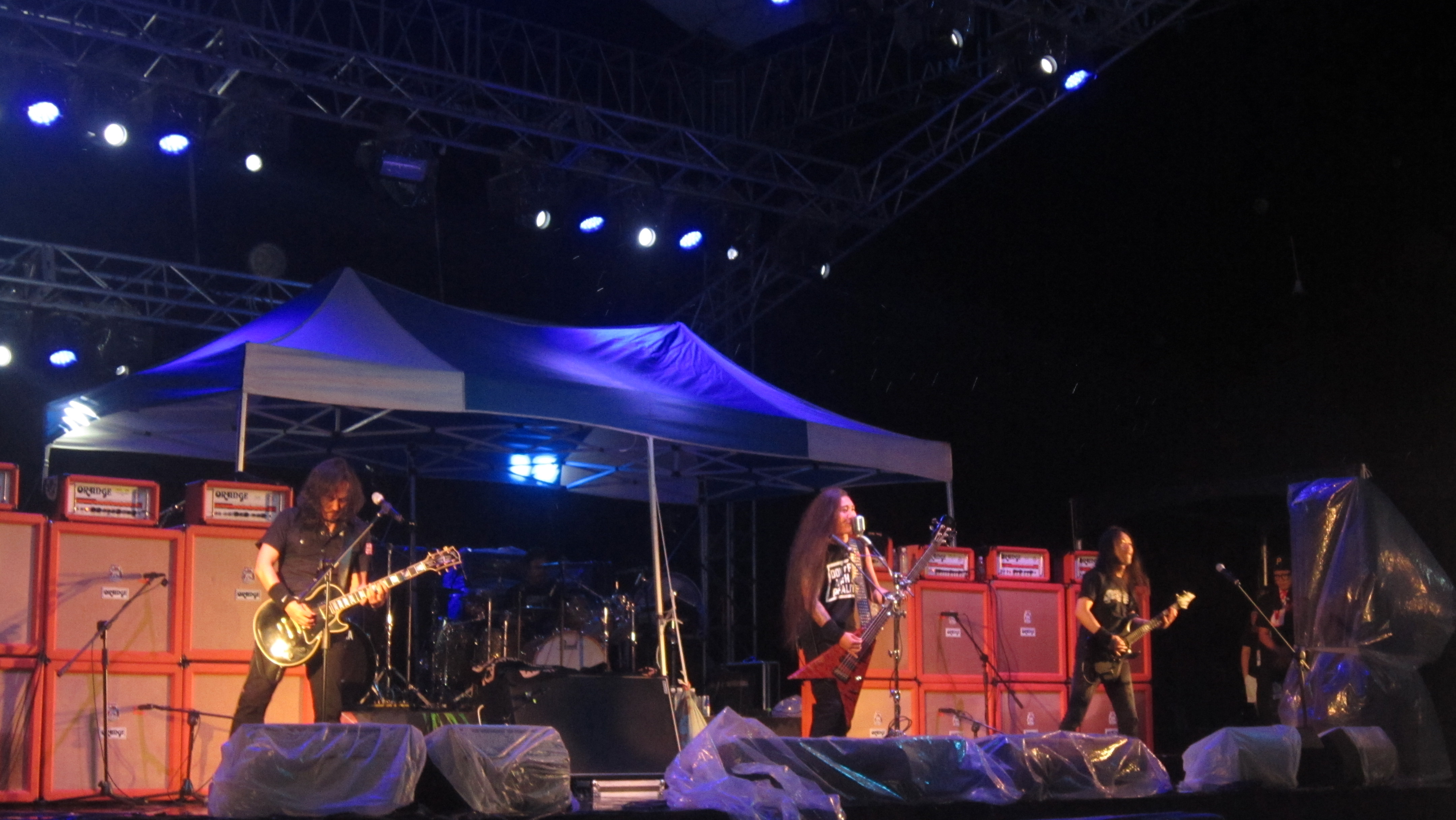
- Crash, 2016 Busan International Rock Festival

Background information
- Origin: Seoul, South Korea
- Genre: Thrash metal
- Years active: 1991–present
- Labels: Seoul Records; Metal Force; Rock Records; Sony Music; CJ E&M
- Members: Ahn Heung-Chan; Jung Yong-Wook; Ha Jae-Yong; Lim Sang-Moook
- Past members: Yun Du-Byung; Lee Sung-Soo; Oh Young-Sang; Kim Yu-Sung

Crash is a South Korean thrash metal band from Seoul.

== History ==
Crash was formed in 1991 with the lineup of Ahn Heung-Chan (vocals, bass guitar), Jung Yong-Wook (drums) and Yoon Doo-Byung (guitar). They were also the first Korean band to provoke slam dancing and stage diving at their concerts.

In 1993, they recorded their debut album Endless Supply of Pain with internationally famous death metal producer, Colin Richardson with whom the band collaborated again on their third and fourth albums. Endless Supply of the Pain was a critical and commercial success with more than 80,000 copies sold in 1993.

Ahn Heung-chan has also provided his backing vocals on two hardcore rap tracks of Korean pop superstars, Seo Taiji & Boys' third album.

After a more death metal-oriented second album To Be or Not to Be, original guitarist Yoon was fired from the band. Their third album, Experimental State of Fear, was recorded in 1997 with two new guitarists, taking a more experimental approach, with the introduction of an industrial aspect to their thrash sound.

They participated in the D.R.I. tribute album We Don't Need Society with a cover version of "Acid Rain" as well as a Stormtroopers of Death tribute album with a cover of "Sargent D & the S.O.D.".

On August 10, 2010, Crash released their sixth album, The Paragon of Animals, which returned to the thrash style of Crash's earlier albums and abandoned the industrial elements of the previous few albums. In its place was a groove metal style comparable to the American band Lamb of God.

The band continued to explore their thrash style in their most recent EP Untamed Hands In Imperfect World, released in 2014 by Sony Music.

Crash won the Korean Music Awards (considered as Korean Grammy Awards) for Best Rock Album in 2011.

== Band members ==
=== Current members ===
- Ahn Heung-chan (Korean: 안흥찬) − bass, vocals (1991−present)
- Jung Yong-Wook (Korean: 정용욱) − drums (1991−present)
- Ha Jae-Yong (Korean: 하재용) − guitars (1996–present)
- Lim Sang-Mook − guitars (2002−2007, 2014–present)

=== Former members ===
- Yoon Du-Byung - guitars (1991−1996, 2008−2010)
- Lee Sung-Soo − guitars (1996−1999)
- Oh Young-Sang − guitars (1999−2002)
- Lim Sang-Mook − guitars (2002−2007)
- Kim Yu-Sung − keyboards (1999−2002)

== Discography ==
=== Albums and EPs ===
- Endless Supply of Pain (1993)
- To Be or Not to Be (1995)
- Experimental State of Fear (1997)
- Terminal Dream Flow (2000)
- The Massive Crush (2003)
- The Paragon of Animals (2010)
- Untamed Hands In Imperfect World (EP) (2014)
