= 2003 in North Korea =

- Centuries: 20th; 21st
- Decades: 1980s; 1990s; 2000s; 2010s; 2020s
- See also: Other events of 2003; Years in North Korea; Timeline of Korean history 2003 in South Korea

Events from the year 2003 in North Korea.

== Incumbents ==
- Premier: Hong Song-nam (until 3 September), Pak Pong-ju (starting 3 September)
- Supreme Leader: Kim Jong-il

== Events ==
- 2003 North Korean parliamentary election
- 2003 North Korean local elections
