= 2002 in South Korea =

- Centuries: 20th; 21st
- Decades: 1980s; 1990s; 2000s; 2010s; 2020s
- See also: Other events in 2002; Years in South Korea; Timeline of Korean history 2002 in North Korea

Events from the year 2002 in South Korea.

== Incumbents ==
- President: Kim Dae-jung
- Prime Minister:
  - Lee Han-dong until July 11,
  - Chang Sang (acting) until July 31,
  - Chang Dae-whan (acting) until August 9,
  - Kim Suk-soo

=== Governors ===
- Gyeonggi: Sohn Hak-kyu
- Gangwon: Kim Jin-sun
- North Chungcheong: Lee Won-jong
- South Chungcheong: Sim Dae-pyung
- North Jeolla: Kang Hyun-wook
- South Jeolla: Park Tae-young
- North Gyeongsang: Lee Eui-geun
- South Gyeongsang: Kim Hyuk-kyu
- Jeju: Woo Geun-min

== Events ==
- January 25: The Korea Independent Commission Against Corruption is established.
- February 21: SBS Plus is launched.
- April 15: Air China Flight 129
- June 13: Yangju highway incident
- June 29: Second Battle of Yeonpyeong
- November 29: 2002 Mnet Asian Music Awards
- December 19: 2002 South Korean presidential election

== Sport ==
- 2002 FIFA World Cup co-hosted with Japan
- 2002 Asian Games
- 2002 K League
- 2002 Korean FA Cup
- 2002 Korean League Cup
- 2002 South Korea national football team season

== Films ==
- List of South Korean films of 2002
- The first edition of the Korean Film Awards

== Births ==
- January 28 - Yoo Seon-ho, actor
- February 5 - Jisung, singer
- February 20 - Yeo Seo-jeong, artistic gymnast
- March 12 - Hong Min-gi, actor
- May 7 - Bang Ye-dam, singer
- August 24 - Ji Yu-chan, swimmer
- September 10 - Cho Han-gyeol, actor
- November 27 - Yu Soo-young, para-badminton player
- December 8 - Sunghoon, singer and former figure skater

== See also ==
- 2002 in South Korean music
