= Eve (South Korean band) =

South Korean glam rock band

Eve (이브)
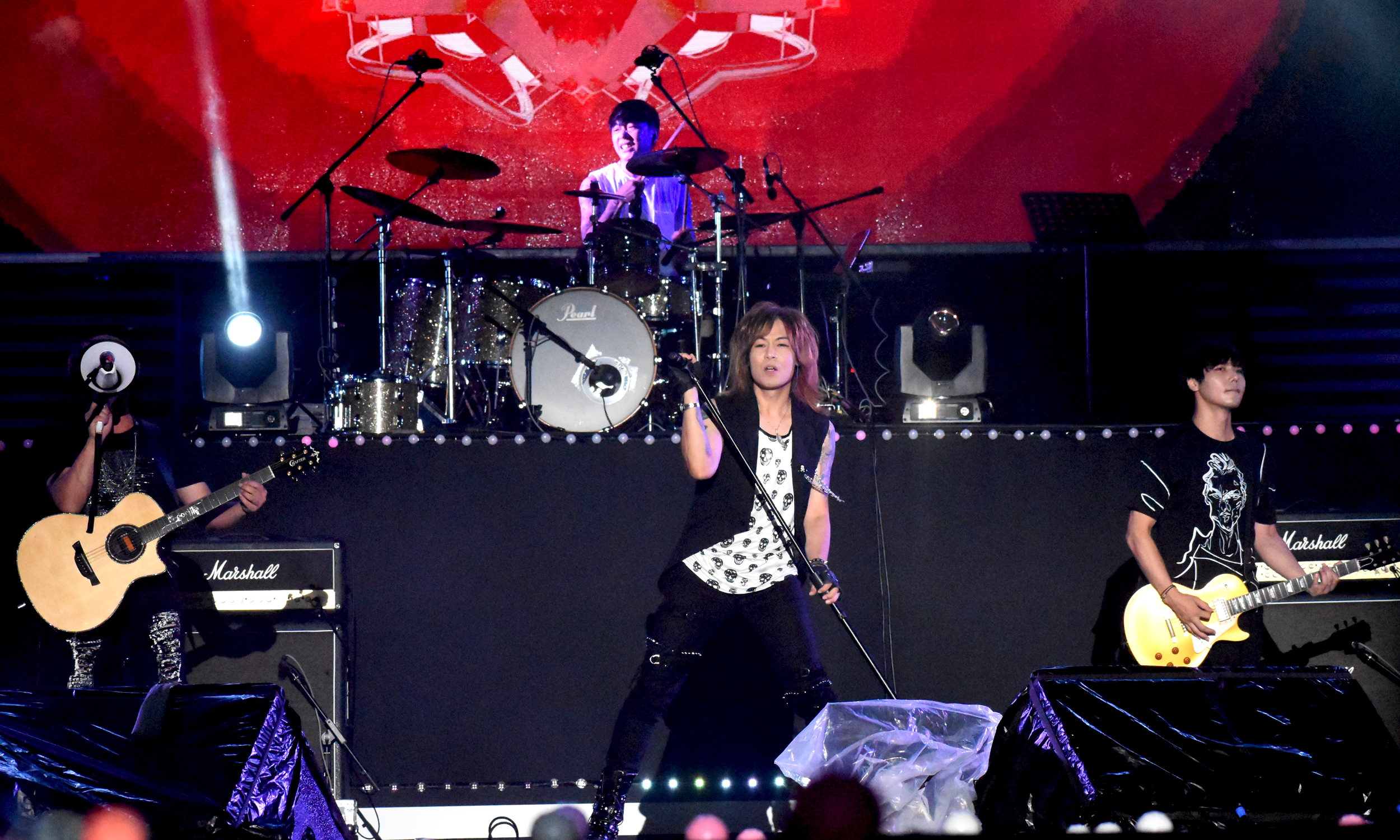
- Eve at the Busan Sea Festival, August 2018

Background information
- Origin: South Korea
- Genres: Glam rock
- Years active: 1997–present
- Labels: Sony BMG; EMI Music Korea; Platinum Music Korea; World Music Records, Korea; I.K.POP/World Music; Yedang Records; WoongJin Music
- Members: Kim Se-heon; G. Gorilla; Park Woong; Kim Gun
- Past members: Jung U. Hwa; Choi Min-chang; Ha Sebin; Kim Seung-joo; Ikki; Choi Ki-ho
- Website: Eve Official Site (Korean)

Eve (Korean: 이브) is a South Korean glam rock band. The band is still active, despite all members of the band having changed with the exception of vocalist Seheon.

== History ==
=== Formation ===
Eve was founded by Kim Seheon on 24 December 1997, taking its name from Christmas Eve. With Seheon as main vocalist and G. Gorilla as the band's backing vocalist and composer, they released their first album, Eve, in August 1998, including their debut single, "Whenever You Feel". In May 1999 they released a second album, Eros, using guitarist Park Woong and bassist Kim Gun as session musicians, who joined the band officially a year later. In April 2000 the band released a third album, Fly To You. The band reached the peak of their popularity in April 2001 with their fourth album, Swear, which featured romantic ballads as well as the more typical rock songs.

=== Eve as Seheon solo ===
After the release of the fourth album, all members except Seheon left the band due to musical differences, despite which Seheon released a fifth album, Ever in November 2002 under Eve's name. The album was without Eve's harder elements, including softer tracks such as "Leaning On Time". By April 2003, two separate greatest hits collections were released.

=== Reformation ===
In October 2003, the band reformed as a full lineup, with guitarists Jung Yuhwa and Ha Sebin, Kim Seungjoo on bass and Choi Minchang on keyboard joining Seheon. Their sixth album, Welcome to Planet Eve, had a darker metal sound. The band also released a DVD, The History of Eve, featuring live performances recorded in Seoul in 2004, along with a live album of the same name.

=== Second reformation ===
Following a two-year hiatus, Eve again reorganized its members in May 2006, with Seheon and Sebin as the central figures. Their seventh album, Seventh Evening, featured a new version of "Whenever You Feel". In September 2007, Sebin was replaced by Choi Kiho as Eve's guitarist, and Ikki joined the band as a bassist, and Eve's first female member. The trio released Play Me, the eighth album, with a punk edge. Soon afterwards Seheon again became the only official member of the band, with Seungjoo and Yuhwa from the Planet Eve era occasionally supporting him during live performances.

From 2007, Eve released a couple of singles, "Guy In Revolution" (March 2010) and "Gloria" (November 2010).

=== Reunion ===
After a long hiatus, Eve returned in 2016 with the original four-piece lineup of Seheon, G. Gorilla, Park Woong and Kim Gun, releasing a music video for their first post-reunion song "Melody" (featuring Heechul) on Christmas Eve. In January 2017, Eve released the album Romantic Show, the eleventh under the name Eve. 11 March 2017 saw Eve make their debut appearance on the KBS program Immortal Songs: Singing the Legend, performing their rendition of 도시의 거리 (City Streets) for the Kim Myung-gon special.

== Members ==
=== Current ===
- Kim Se-heon – Vocals (1997–present)
- G. Gorilla – Backing vocals, keyboard, (1998–present)
- Park Woong - Guitar (1999–present)
- Kim Gun – Bass (1999–present)

=== Former members ===
- Ha Se-bin – Guitar (2003-2006)
- Jung U.hwa – Guitar (2003-2013)
- Kim Seung-joo - Bass (2003-2004)
- Choi Min-chang - Keyboard (2003-2004)
- Choi Ki-ho - Guitar (2007-2008)
- Ikki - Bass (2007-2008)

== Discography ==
Studio albums

- Eve (1998)
- Eros (1999)
- Fly to You (2000)
- Swear (2001)
- EveR (2002)
- Welcome to Planet Eve (2003)
- Memoir For Your Everything (Eve best of album) (2003)
- The History of Eve: Live in Seoul (2004)
- Seventh EVEning (2006)
- Play Me (2007)
- Romantic Show (2017)

Singles

- Guy In Revolution (2010)
- Gloria (2010)
- Melody (2016)

Joint Projects

- Eve Christmas Carols B.E.S.T (1998)
- Maria Vol. 3 - Mariani (Phantom of the Opera) (2006)
- Fusion (with DuelJewel) (2012)

DVD

- The History of Eve: Live in Seoul (2004)
