= 2004 in North Korea =

- Centuries: 20th; 21st
- Decades: 1980s; 1990s; 2000s; 2010s; 2020s
- See also: Other events of 2004; Years in North Korea; Timeline of Korean history 2004 in South Korea

Events from the year 2004 in North Korea.

== Incumbents ==
- Premier: Pak Pong-ju
- Supreme Leader: Kim Jong-il

== Events ==
- April 22 – Ryongchon disaster: Two trains carrying explosives and fuel collide in Ryongchon, North Korea, killing 161 people, injuring 1,300 and destroying thousands of homes.
- May 24 – North Korea bans mobile phones (see Communications in North Korea).

== Births ==
- 14 January – Ri Il-song, footballer
