= Ha Geun-chan =

South Korean writer

- Born: October 21, 1931
- Died: November 25, 2007 (aged 76)
- Citizenship: South Korean
- Writing career
- Language: Korean

- Korean name
- Hangul: 하근찬
- Hanja: 河瑾燦
- RR: Ha Geunchan
- MR: Ha Kŭnch'an

Ha Geun-chan (Korean: 하근찬) was an early modern South Korean writer.

== Life ==
Ha Geun-chan was born on October 21, 1931, in Yeongcheon, Keishōhoku-dō (North Gyeongsang Province), Korea, Empire of Japan and died on November 25, 2007. At the time Korea was under Japanese colonial rule. Ha was the eldest son of Ha Jae-jung and Bak Yeon-hak. His primary and secondary education was under the aegis of the Japanese "naisen ittai(内鮮一体)" movement, an attempt by the Japanese colonial government to create Japanese citizens out of Korean ones. In fact, not uncommonly, he did not learn Korean in earnest until he entered higher education, in this case a teacher's college. Ha passed his teacher-licensing exam and began teaching elementary school. Ha entered Dong-a University, but did not complete his studies, and after serving his military service in 1958, began a career as a writer.

== Work ==
Although Ha Geun-chan is a writer who belongs to the “postwar generation,” his literary concern does not include urban devastation or the consciousness of petit-bourgeois as shaped in the aftermath of the war, which characterize other works of fiction from that generation. Rather, he uses rural landscape and simple-hearted country folk to shed light on another dimension of the Korean War's traumatic impact on Korean people. “Suffering of Two Generations” presents a man who lost an arm during World War II and his only son, who returns home from the Korean War, having lost his leg. Yet the simplicity of the man and his son, who accept their tragedy as a fate to be overcome, affirms the possibility of rejuvenation. In “Excrement” (Bun), a mother empties her bowels in the township office for not exempting her son from military conscription. In “The Royal Tombs and Occupying Forces,” (Wangneunggwa judungun) a dedicated tomb keeper, who tries to protect the sacred grounds from being used as a site for prostitution, is horrified to discover that his only daughter has had sexual relations with foreign soldiers. At times comical and even obtuse, Ha Geunchan's characters nonetheless possess the strength of will to survive, the heartiness to endure and the regenerative spirit rooted in simple faith. The author maintains a sympathetic attitude towards his subjects without drifting towards sentimentality.

== Works in Translation ==
- The suffering of Two Generations (2013)
- The Spring Song, Ill-Fated Father and Son, The Color of Mugwort, in Two Travellers.

== Works in Korean (Partial) ==
Novels

- Chamber Pot (Yaho, 1972)
- A Short Biography of Wollye (Wollye sojeon, 1978)
- Mountains and Plains (Sane deure, 1984)
- Little Dragon (Jaggeun yong, 1989).

== Awards ==
- Korean Literature Award (1970)
- Yosan Literature Award (1984)
