= 2007 North Korean local elections =

Elections to provincial, municipal, city, county and district people's assemblies (도·시·군 인민회의 대의원 선거) were held in North Korea on July 29, 2007.

27,390 provincial, municipal, city, county and district people's assembly deputies were elected.

Voter turnout was reported as 99.82%, with candidates receiving a 100% approval rate.
