= 2008 in North Korea =

- Centuries: 20th; 21st
- Decades: 1980s; 1990s; 2000s; 2010s; 2020s
- See also: Other events of 2008; Years in North Korea; Timeline of Korean history 2008 in South Korea

The following lists events that happened in 2008 in North Korea.

== Census ==
The 2008 North Korea Census recorded the population of North Korea as 24,052,231 inhabitants (11,721,838 male and 12,330,393 female).

== Incumbents ==
- Premier: Kim Yong-il
- Supreme Leader: Kim Jong-il
