= 2005 in North Korea =

- Centuries: 20th; 21st
- Decades: 1980s; 1990s; 2000s; 2010s; 2020s
- See also: Other events of 2005; Years in North Korea; Timeline of Korean history 2005 in South Korea

The following lists events that happened during 2005 in North Korea.

== Incumbents ==
- Supreme Leader: Kim Jong-il
- President of the Supreme People's Assembly: Kim Yong-nam
- Premier: Pak Pong-ju

== Events ==
=== February ===
- February 22 – North Korea hints that it may be willing to return to nuclear negotiations under unspecified conditions.

=== April ===
- April 22 – Rumors abound that a nuclear test by North Korea may be imminent, and that the United States is urging the People's Republic of China to pressure North Korea not to do so.

=== May ===
- May 16 – The United Nations World Food Program states that North Korea is in dire need of food aid.

=== July ===
- July 25 – Bilateral negotiations have resumed between the US and North Korea.

=== September ===
- September 20 – North Korea announces that its offer to end its nuclear arms program is dependent on it being allowed to build a civilian nuclear reactor.

== Deaths ==
- October 22 – Yon Hyong-muk, 7th Premier of North Korea (b. 1931).
