= Nemesis (South Korean band) =

South Korean rock band

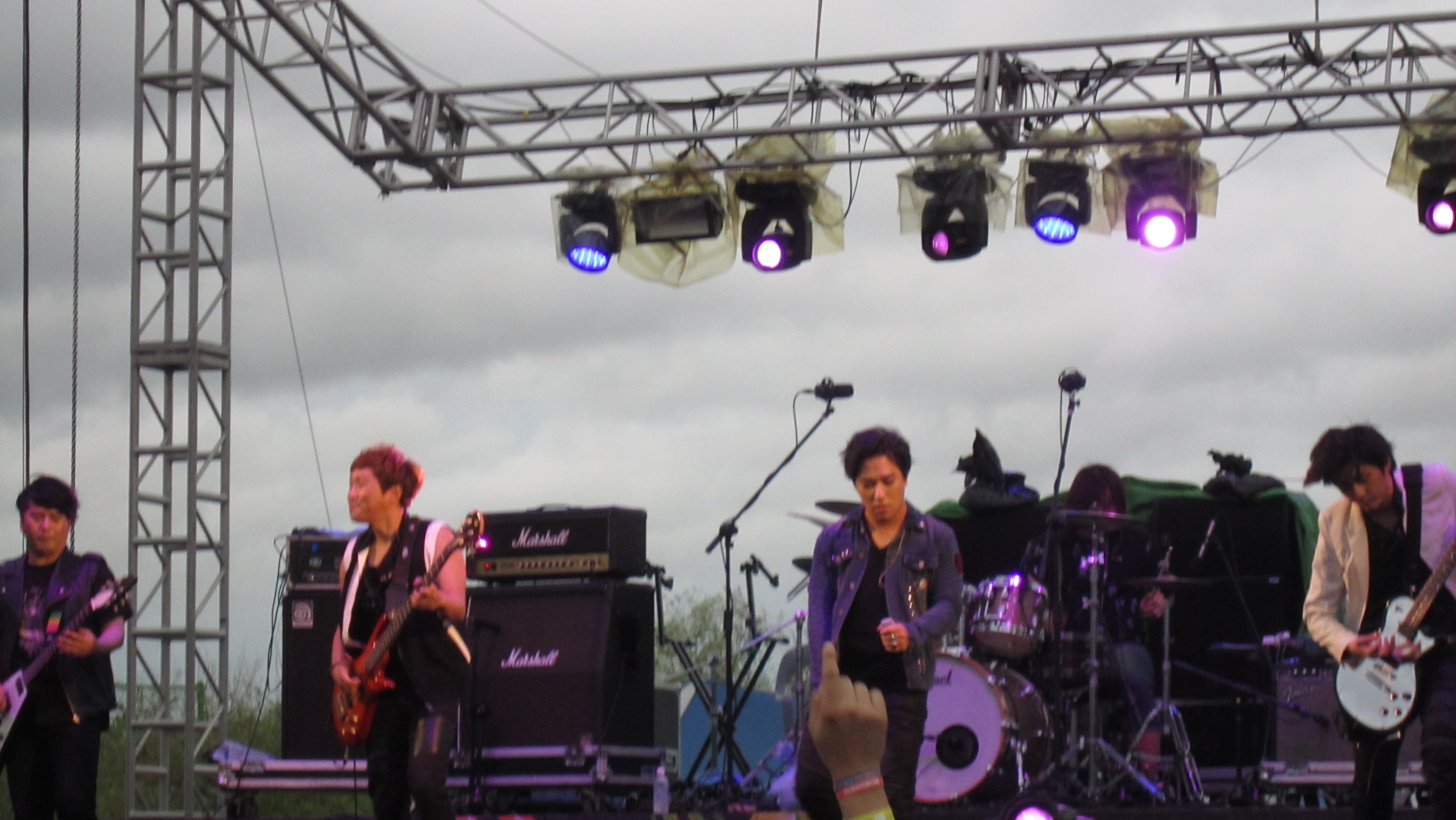
- Nemesis, 2016 Busan International Rock Festival

Background information
- Origin: South Korea
- Genres: Rock
- Years active: 1997-present
- Label: Sony Music Entertainment Korea
- Members: Noh Seungho (lead vocals); Jeon Gwiseung (guitar, backing vocals); Ha Sebin (lead guitar, piano); Jung Euyseok (drums); Choi Sungwoo (bass)
- Website: Official website

Nemesis (Korean: 네미시스) is a South Korean rock band formed in May 1997. They reestablished with lead vocals Noh seung ho. and They released their debut album "La Rose de Versailles" in 2005. The band consists of Noh Seung ho (lead vocals), Ha Se bin (lead guitar, piano), Jeon Gui seung (guitar, backing vocals), Choi Sung woo (bass), Jung Eui seok (drums). The music can be categorised as Postmodern music.

== Discography ==
=== Studio albums ===
Title	Album details	Peak chart positions	Sales
Title	Album details	KOR	Sales
La Rose De Versailles (베르사이유의 장미)	Released: September 15, 2005; Label: Sony Music; Formats: CD, cassette	No data	
Lovesick	Released: October 22, 2009; Label: Sony Music; Formats: CD, digital download	No data	
Piano	Released: August 23, 2011; Label: Sony Music; Formats: CD, digital download	27	
Dream	Released: February 28, 2013; Label: Sony Music; Formats: CD, digital download	17	KOR: 1,136
White Night	Released: January 10, 2019; Label: Sony Music; Formats: CD, digital download	73	

== History summary ==
- 1997 : Nemesis is a school boy band formed in May 1997.(Ha Se bin, Jeon Gui seung, Choi Sung woo, Jung Eui seok)
- 2000 : Rotte world rock festival.
- 2002 : Rock band joint concert (Cherry Filter, Emerald Castle, Butterfly Effect), TTL concert, Gate in seoul festival... KMTV, M.net TV, MTV...
- 2003 : With rock band Eve (Hasebin - composition & guitar)
- 2004 : SK'Melon' digital sound source [조각사랑]
- 2005 : Nemesis reestablished in 2005 (with No Seung ho), 1st album [La rose de Versailles]& solo concert tour in Korea.
- 2006 : [La rose de Versailles], [Cotton candy] - top100, cyworld BGM of Fame, MBC TV serial drama 'Finding Dorothy' OST
- 2007-2009 : military 'Service.
- 2009 : 1st single album [사랑에 빠졌어], dong du chun rock festival, Let's rock festival, Korea-Japan rock festival등... 2nd album [Lovesick] & solo concert tour in Korea... ariang TV, M.net TV, MTV...
- 2010 : Green plugged rock festival, Hero rock festival, Korea rive music festival, Seoul fringe rock festival, Joen ju sound festival... KBS radio, MTV, ariang TV...
- 2011 : Indie Regeneration Show, Hero rock festival, ROTR festival, MAC indie festival, Ulsan summer festival, Rock生Rock死... Arirang radio, KBS Mapo FM...3rd album [The piano]& solo concert tour in Korea., olleh music indie award 'artist', KBS TV serial drama 'Brain' BGM [우리는 사랑이었을까]
- 2012 : Let's rock festival, Korea rive music festival, seoul rive music festa (vol.1~9,11), Stop dumping music concert, rollinghall big3 concert... Jeon ju sorie club party, Yanyang chaeum festival, international exposition Yeosu Korea... LIG arthall concert, Jin air green concert, solo concert... KBS TV Topband2, KBS TV all that music, KBS Ulsan, MBCmusic TV K-rock Invasion... Tokyo Shibuya MUSDL Award (Japan), 軒尼詩炫音之樂 壓軸音樂派對 in Taipei( Taiwan ), K-rock ”バトル” Live The sound of top band( Japan ), Hennessy Artistry in Shanghai( China )...
