= LPG (South Korean group) =

South Korean girl group

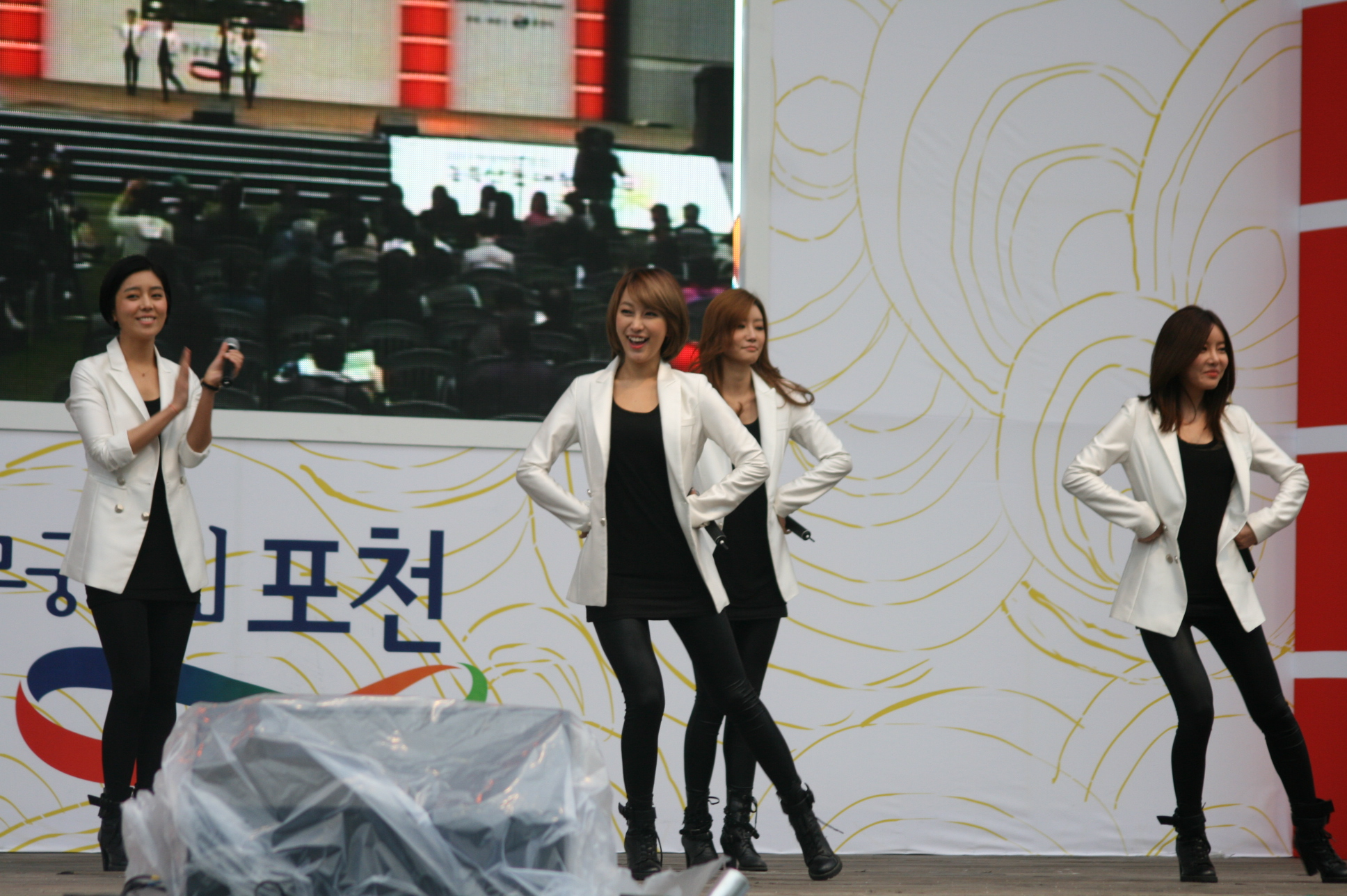

Background information
- Origin: South Korea
- Genres: K-pop
- Years active: 2005-2016
- Labels: Aquagro Entertainment
- Past members: Hanyoung; Sooah; Yeonoh; Yoonah; Daeun; Gayeon; Eunbyul; Suyun; Semi; Yu Mi; Rahi; Rika; Lani; Yuju; Ahyul; Jieun; Jiwon; Riwon; Songha

LPG (Korean: 엘피지; an acronym for "Lovely Pretty Girls") was a South Korean girl group that debuted in 2005 under Chan2 Productions, inspired by the success of "semi-trot" singer Jang Yoon Jung. Their name showcases the fact that several of this group were pageant participants, with two of them having made it into the Miss Korea pageant, the group's final line-up consist of four members Jiwon, Jieun, Riwon and Songha, The group disbanded in 2016.

== History ==
=== Debut and self-titled album ===
Their first album, Long Pretty Girls, was released in fall of 2005. Although most of the record consists of dance tracks, their first (and only) single from the album was called "캉캉 (Can Can)" a song performed in the "Can-can style". The novelty of the song brought them a lot of attention from the press, but neither the song nor the album were commercially popular, the group's debut was a commercial failure, It has been referenced and parodied by many Korean variety shows, including SBS' X-Man and KBS' Star Golden Bell.

=== 2006: "Arm Pillow" ===
Their second album was released at the end of September 2006, accompanied by a sexier image. The first single, "Korean: 팔베개" (literally "Arm Pillow"), is quite different than "Can Can", having more of a Latin feel and a more rhythmic beat. Limited promotional activities were done, the album sold poorly, entering at number 33 on the Music Industry Association of Korea's monthly sales chart with 2,359 copies sold;

=== 2007: "Princess of the Sea" and "Winter Story" ===
LPG released a single in the summer of 2007. Titled "바다의 공주" ("Princess of the Sea"), it is a remake of comedian Park Myung-soo's "바다의 왕자" ("Prince of the Sea"); the release contained both versions.

On December 13, 2007, LPG released a winter single, titled "Winter Story". The first track, "스키장 가는 길" ("The Road to the Ski Hill"), was their first promotional single.

=== 2008–2010: Member changes and "Doorbell of Love" ===
On March 19, 2008, it was announced that Hanyoung and Sooah would be leaving the group due to their individual projects; the management group said that new members would be chosen. In 2009 the band returned with new members.

In June 2010, Chani Music released a statement saying that DaEun had decided to leave the group to become an actress and would be replaced by former A-Force member EunByul. Shortly afterwards, the group made their comeback with "Doorbell Of Love".

=== 2011: "I'm Sorry I'm a Noona", "Angry", and temporary hiatus ===
The group released their comeback song "I'm Sorry I'm a Noona" in January 2011, with the song being about a woman who laments the fact that the younger man she's interested in only sees her as a "noona", or older sister.

In February 2011, the group announced that they would be heading to Japan as enka singers (enka is a similar style of music to Korean trot). The statement read, "They've received love calls from three major Japanese distribution companies, which we are looking over now. We predict that finalization of details – such as their Japanese agency and album release – will be done as early as next month. We received a lot of contract offers due to the fact that there aren’t any young enka singers like LPG in Japan, or for that matter, any enka singers made up into teams, so there's a high potential for success."

In March 2011, they released the single and music video for "Angry", the Korean version of Yolanda Be Cool's "We No Speak Americano".

On May 12, 2011, former member YoonAh released a solo single titled "I'll Forget You". The video contained a "love scene" that many people found controversial, resulting in the company releasing a statement, saying "We put the bed scene in to represent two lovers that are deeply in love with each other and having a heart fluttering night. Don't just look at that one part but rather the content in its whole."

=== 2013: Comeback as a 9-member group and Hyo Nyeo Shi Dae ===
The group had a comeback in October of that year after a 2-year hiatus with mini album "효녀시대" (Romanized: "Hyo Nyeo Shi Dae"; English: "Filial Daughters' Generation") and new line-up. The new line-up consisted of 9 members: Rahi, Rika, Lani, Jiwon, Yuju, Riwon, Songha, Jieun, and Eunji (as known as Ahyul).

The group had their comeback stage on November 9 on Show Champion.

=== 2015: Member changes and comeback as 4-member group with the single "Slowpoke" ===
After almost 2 years, it was announced that the members Rahi, Rika, Lani, Yuju, and Ahyul left the group. The remaining 4 members Jiwon, Jieun, Riwon, and Songha were preparing to release a new song in August. The group made its comeback as a quartet releasing the song "Slowpoke" on August 15, 2015.

=== 2016: Jieun’s departure and disbandment ===
In July 2016, Jieun left the group and the company and joined girl group RaNia under the company DR Music.

LPG disbanded in October 2016.

== Past members ==
=== 1st Generation ===
- Yeonoh (연오)
- Yoonah (윤아)

==== until March 2008 ====
- Hanyoung (한영)
- Sooah (수아)

=== 2nd Generation ===
- Daeun (다은) (until June 2010)
- Yumi (유미)
- Semi (세미)
- Gayoung (가영)
- Suyun (수윤)
- Eunbyul (은별)

=== 3rd Generation ===
- Rahee (라희)
- Rika (리카)
- Lani (라니)
- Yuju (유주)
- Ahyul (아율)
- Jieun (지은) (until July 2016)

==== until disbanding ====
- Jiwon (지원)
- Songha (송하)
- Riwon (리원)

== Discography ==
=== Albums ===
- Long Pretty Girls (2005)
- LPG2 (2006)
- Lucky Girl (2009)
- LPG – LPG The Special Album (2011)
- Filial Daughters' Generation (2013)

=== Singles ===
- "Princess of the Sea" (Korean: 바다의 공주), released July 12, 2007
- "The Road to the Ski Hill" (Korean: 스키장 가는 길), released December 13, 2007
- "Pow Pow" (Korean: 빵야빵야), released December 16, 2013
- "Slowpoke" (Korean: 느림보), released September 10, 2015

== Awards ==
Year	Award-Giving Body	Category	Work	Result
2007	Mnet Asian Music Awards	Best Female Group	"Princess of the Sea"	Nominated
