= Kim Hyo-ki =

South Korean footballer (born 2003)

Personal information
- Date of birth: 4 July 2003 (age 23)
- Place of birth: Hwaseong, South Korea
- Height: 1.74 m (5 ft 9 in)
- Position: Attacking midfielder

Team information
- Current team: Yeoncheon FC
- Number: 30

Youth career
- Daedong Elementary School
- Mokdong Middle School
- 2015–2019: Cracks
- 2020–2021: Alboraya
- 2021–2022: Roda

Senior career*
Years	Team	Apps	(Gls)
2021–2022	Roda	23	(2)
2022	Roda B	1	(0)
2022–2023	Villarreal C	10	(0)
2024–	Yeoncheon FC	39	(4)
- * Club domestic league appearances and goals as of 16:53, 5 July 2023 (UTC) ‡ National team caps and goals as of 21:36, 5 July 2023 (UTC)

- Kim Hyo-ki
- Hangul: 김효기
- RR: Gim Hyogi
- MR: Kim Hyogi

Kim Hyo-ki (Korean: 김효기; born 4 July 2003) is a South Korean footballer who currently plays as a forward for Yeoncheon FC.

== Club career ==
Having played football at the Daedong Elementary School in Seoul and the Mokdong Middle School, Kim travelled to Spain as a child, competing in a youth competition, where he attracted the interest of professional side Villarreal. He joined the club in 2015, but was unable to play due to laws in Spain stating that he would be unable to register with the club until he turned eighteen. He spent four years training with Villarreal affiliate CF Cracks, before spending the 2020–21 season with another affiliate, Alboraya UD.

The following season, he was sent to a third affiliate club, Roda, who were competing in the Tercera División RFEF. He finished the season with two goals from twenty-five appearances, also playing once in the Preferente Valenciana for Roda's B team. He returned to Villarreal the following season, being assigned to the club's C team in the Tercera Federación.

== Career statistics ==
=== Club ===
As of 5 July 2023.

Appearances and goals by club, season and competition
Club	Season	League			Cup		Other		Total	
Club	Season	Division	Apps	Goals	Apps	Goals	Apps	Goals	Apps	Goals
Villarreal C	2021–22	Tercera División RFEF	0	0	0	0	0	0	0	0
Villarreal C	2022–23	Tercera Federación	10	0	0	0	0	0	10	0
Villarreal C	Total		10	0	0	0	0	0	10	0
Roda	2021–22	Tercera División RFEF	23	2	2 (Note: Appearances in Copa del Rey qualification)	0	0	0	25	2
Roda B	2021–22	Preferente Valenciana	1	0	0	0	0	0	1	0
Career total			34	2	2	0	0	0	36	2
