= 2005 in South Korea =

- Centuries: 20th; 21st
- Decades: 1980s; 1990s; 2000s; 2010s; 2020s
- See also: Other events in 2005; Years in South Korea; Timeline of Korean history 2005 in North Korea

Events from the year 2005 in South Korea.

== Incumbents ==
- President: Roh Moo-hyun
- Prime Minister: Lee Hae-chan

=== Governors ===
- Gyeonggi: Sohn Hak-kyu
- Gangwon: Kim Jin-sun
- North Chungcheong: Lee Won-jong
- South Chungcheong: Sim Dae-pyung
- North Jeolla: Kang Hyun-wook
- South Jeolla: Park Jun-young
- North Gyeongsang: Lee Eui-geun
- South Gyeongsang: Kim Tae-ho
- Jeju: Kim Tae-hwan

== Events ==
- July 8: 42nd Grand Bell Awards
- September 8: Manhunt International 2005
- November 27: 2005 Mnet Asian Music Awards
- December 1: The Truth and Reconciliation Commission is established.
- 2005 anti-Japanese demonstrations
- X-file scandal
- The Peace Dam is completed.

== Sport ==
- South Korea at the 2005 Asian Indoor Games
- South Korea at the 2005 East Asian Games
- South Korea at the 2005 World Championships in Athletics
- 2005 Asian Athletics Championships
- 2005 Asian Canoe Slalom Championships
- 2005 EAFF Women's Football Championship
- 2005 in South Korean football

== Film ==
- List of South Korean films of 2005

== Births ==
- January 27 - Nam Su-hyeon, archer
- February 21 - Hong Hwa-ri, actress
- March 15 - Wi Seo-yeong, retired figure skater
- April 16 - Lee Hae-in, figure skater
- May 2 - Park Soo-oh, actor
- May 10 - Oh Ye-jin, pistol shooter
- May 17 - Hwang Min-woo, actor, singer, and dancer
- July 8 - Kim Ji-young, actress
- September 22 - Lim Ju-heon, figure skater
- October 17 - Hwang Min-woo, actor, singer, and dancer
- October 24 - Lee Ji-woo, singer and actress

== Deaths ==
- February 22 - Lee Eun-ju, actress (b. 1980)

== See also ==
- 2005 in South Korean music
