= 2002 in North Korea =

- Centuries: 20th; 21st
- Decades: 1980s; 1990s; 2000s; 2010s; 2020s
- See also: Other events of 2002; Years in North Korea; Timeline of Korean history 2002 in South Korea

Events from the year 2002 in North Korea.

== Incumbents ==
- Premier: Hong Song-nam
- Supreme Leader: Kim Jong-il

== Events ==
- Japan–North Korea Pyongyang Declaration
- Second Battle of Yeonpyeong

== Births ==
- 2 January – Kim Kyong-yong, footballer
- 23 February – Choe Kum-ok, footballer
- 15 April – Kim Pom-hyok, footballer
- 12 June – Ri Hak, footballer
- 5 July – Ri Su-jong, footballer
