= The Massive Crush =

Studio album by Crash
- Released: November 8, 2003
- Genre: Industrial metal Groove metal Thrash metal
- Label: Sony Music; CLK-9191

Crash chronology
Terminal Dream Flow (2000)	The Massive Crush (2003)	The Paragon of Animals (2010)

The Massive Crush is the fifth album by the South Korean thrash metal band Crash, released in 2003. The song "Dignity" is known because appears in Pump It Up dance games series as a selectable song to dance.

== Track listing ==
1. "Whirlwind Struggle" – 4:23
2. "비아(非我)" – 3:48
3. "Psychedelic Storm" – 3:54
4. "Discipline" – 2:58
5. "Moss (Dead Water Love)" – 4:56
6. "어떤이의 꿈" (Spring, Summer, Autumn And Fall (봄여름가을겨울) Cover) - 3:34
7. "Breath Form Another" – 4:34
8. "Acid Rain" (Dirty Rotten Imbeciles Cover) – 3:41
9. "Dignity" – 2:35
10. "무상(無想)" – 4:47
11. "Vaporousness" (Instrumental) – 1:39
12. "니가 진짜로 원하는게 뭐야" (Shin Hae Chul Cover) – 4:28
13. "Turn To Dust" - 4:13
14. "이빨" – 4:20
