= Winterplay =

South Korean pop-jazz artist

- Origin: South Korea
- Genre: Pop jazz
- Years active: 2007–present
- Label: Loudpigs Music
- Members: Juhan Lee
- Website: www.winterplay.com

Winterplay (Korean: 윈터플레이) is a pop-jazz artist from South Korea who debuted in 2007. He has released four albums, with the last album titled Jazz Cookin' (2019). Juhan Lee, a producer, songwriter and trumpet player, created the project in November 2007 and by 2008, he succeeded signing an international distribution deal with Universal Music Japan for worldwide distribution. (From 2008 to 2015 the project included lead vocalist Haewon (Haewon Moon / Moon Hye-won), with bassist Eunkyu So (So Eun Kyu) and guitarist Saza-Woojoon Choi as supporting members.) Winterplay has not only earned attention from Korea, but also creating waves in Japan and rest of the world as a first leader of "jazz hallyu". Lee's latest jazz ballad, “Gganbu (067 & 240)” was inspired by Netflix drama Squid Games featuring the Korean instrument, haegum. Winterplay was the Music Show Runner for International Jazz Day 2022, which was funded by the City of Seoul, and produced by Loudpigs Music, where he also served as the music producer. In the 90 mins show, Winterplay hosted the show, performed under the band he formed for the International Jazz Day 2022 occasion and directed over 30 jazz musicians in 4 venues in Seoul.

== History ==
- In 2008, Winterplay was charted No. 1 in the jazz section of iTunes, and became the first Asian artist to perform at Billboard Live in Japan. Since his first international debut in Japan in 2009 with his Songs of Colored Love album, he has released in 26 countries worldwide, with an international release showcase in London in 2010. Currently, Winterplay has 2 Gold Records in the category of Jazz in Korea for “Hot Summerplay”, and in Hong Kong for his second album Sunshines. The Sunshines album release in Hong Kong's record franchise HMV, ranked no. 1 for the best-selling jazz album.
- In 2013, Winterplay was invited to Jade Solid Gold, one of the most prestigious music shows in Hong Kong. He was the first musician to be featured from abroad.
- In 2014, Winterplay was invited to “The Sky Jazz: A Tribute to King” set to open on December 20 in Bangkok along with several big-name global musicians such as the Count Basie Orchestra, Larry Carlton, John Pizzarelli and Diane Schuur. Except for some Thai musicians, Winterplay was the only Asian band to perform in this festival.
- His third album titled Two Fabulous Fools was released in Korea on July 17, 2013. As of October 2013, Universal Music Hong Kong has also signed Winterplay for his release of Two Fabulous Fools in Hong Kong, China, Taiwan, Macau, Thailand, Singapore and Indonesia.
- Winterplay released his fourth album titled " Jazz Cookin' " in Korea in March 2019.

== Music style ==
- The genre of Winterplay's music is on the borders between jazz, pop, latin, and lounge. Unlike typical jazz songs dependent on piano, the strength of Winterplay's music is the pop feeling, strong melody, and short length without piano. Their jazz style is influenced by Louis Armstrong and it was decided to fuse their love of pop and jazz.

== Band members ==
- Juhan Lee - producer, songwriter, jazz trumpeter

== Discography ==
| Year | Details | Title | Track listing |
|---|---|---|---|
| 2022.05 | Single | Gganbu (456 & 001) | 1. Gganbu (456 & 001) |
| 2022.04 | Single | Gganbu (067 & 240) | 1. Gganbu (067 & 240) |
| 2019.03 | 4th Album | Jazz Cookin' | Track listing: 1. "Take Five"; 2. "How Deep Is Your Love"; 3. "Jazz Foo Foo (Rejazzed)"; 4. "After The Play (feat. Grace)"; 5. "Imagine (feat. Aberdeen Orange)"; 6. "Vanilla Sky"; 7. "Stand By Your Man (feat. Aberdeen Orange)"; 8. "Love Me Tender (feat. Hyunwoo Lee)"; 9. "What A Wonderful World"; 10. "All About Love (Rejazzed)" |
| 2017.12 | EP | All About Love | Track listing: 1. "All About Love"; 2. "Love Ain't So Good"; 3. "Jazz Foo Foo"; 4. "Love, Love. Love (Feat. Saneh Kang)"; 5. "Es Tu Vida (Feat. Grace)" |
| 2017.10 | Single | Es Tu Vida | Track listing: 1. "Es Tu Vida (Feat. Grace)" |
| 2016.06 | Single | Purple Rain | Track listing: 1. "Purple Rain" |
| 2014.12 | Single | White Winter | Track listing: 1. "White Winter" |
| 2014.06 | Collaboration | 42nd Summerplay | Track listing: 1. "Dream Your Dream" |
| 2013.07 | 3rd Album | Two Fabulous Fools | Track listing: 1. "Shake It Up And Down; 2. "Complicated You And Me (Feat.Jang Yoon-ju)"; 3. "Be My Baby"; 4. "As Tears Go By"; 5. "Pure Heart"; 6. "노란 샤쓰의 사나이"; 7. "So Much For Love"; 8. "Yoboseyo Baby"; 9. "Puppy Love"; 10. "Last Song" |
| 2012.12 | Single | Just This Christmas | Track listing: 1. "Just This Christmas" |
| 2010.09 | 2nd Album | Touché Mon Amour | Track listing: 1. "Songs Of Colored Love; 2. "Your Eyes; 3. "Touche Mon Amour (투셰모나모)"; 4. "Moon Over Bourbon Street"; 5. "Hey Bob (Rejazzed); 6. "June Ballad"; 7. "Those Darn Feelings"; 8. "I Need To Be In Love"; 9. "눈 내리던 어느 날"; 10. "Don't Know Why"; 11. "세월이 가면"; 12. "Shout"; 13. "Blue Without You" |
| 2009.07 | Special | Hot Summerplay | Track listing: 1. "Cha Cha"; 2. "Crazy Love; 3. "Gypsy Girl"; 4. "Dream Street"; 5. "On Sunday"; 6. "I've Been A Bad Girl"; 7. "Billie Jean"; 8. "Scandalizing Me"; 9. "너의 기억만으로"; 10. "You Got It"; 11. "Summer Blues" |
| 2008.11 | Repackage | Happy Snow Bubble | Track listing: 1. "Men Are No Good"; 2. "Happy Bubble"; 3. "Who Are You?" |
| 2008.09 | Single | Happy Bubble | Track listing: 1. "Happy Bubble"; 2. "Who Are You?"; 3. "Happy Bubble" |
| 2008.01 | 1st Album | Choco Snow Ball | Track listing: 1. "Hot Sauce"; 2. "Melon Man"; 3. "Serivora"; 4. "Quando, Quando, Quando"; 5. "Holidays Without You"; 6. "Winter Blues"; 7. "Hey Bob"; 8. "You're In My Heart; 9. "Cannot Forget (못잊어)"; 10. "Pretty Brown Eyes; 11. "Farewell (For Byul)" |

== Tours and Concerts ==
=== Korea and International ===
- "Soul of Seoul Celebrates International Jazz Day 2022", Online Concert (April 2022)
- "VISTAGE Voice 1 - Let's Get Lost with Winterplay", Vista Walkerhill Seoul (August 2019)
- "Jazz Cookin' - DJ Soulscape Curated 12", Hyundai Card Understage, Seoul (April 2019)
- "Nonstop Summer Fever - Curated 24", Hyundai Card Understage, Seoul (July 2016)
- "Jazz Concert" Macao Cultural Centre (December 2015)
- "Nonstop Jazz Fever", LG Art Hall, Seoul (April 2014)
- "Jazz World Live Series", Hong Kong (December 2012)
- Japan Sunset Live Festival, Japan (September 2011)
- Japan Hayama Tribute to Bill Evans, in Japan, Japan (August 2011)
- Sapporo International Jazz Festival, Japan (July 2011)
- Hong Kong Summer Jazz Festival 2011, Hong Kong (May 2011)
- Mister Kelley's, Osaka (March 2011)
- Tour Concert in Japan "2011 Spring Tour", Toured 13 cities in Japan from North to South (March 2011)
- Tour Concert in Japan "Scene of Winter", Sendai, Iwaki, Kanai, Tokyo, Osaka, Shimonoeki (November 2010)
- JZ Brat Jazz Club, Tokyo (November 2010)
- Worldwide Release Party and Showcase in London, England (September 2010)
- Thames Festival Concert, England (September 2010)
- Live Tour in Japan, Blue Note Nagoya (September 2010)
- Live Tour in Japan, Blues Alley Tokyo (September 2010)
- Japan Kanazawa Jazz Festival, Japan (September 2010)
- Billboard Live Concert in Japan, Tokyo and Osaka (November 2009)
- Korea Philippines 60 Years Friendship Concert in Manila, Philippines (September 2009)
- 1st Show case in Japan, Rolling Stone in Roppongi, Tokyo (June 2009)
- Tokyo Asia Music Market Representing Korea, Japan (October 2008)
