= Nam Hyun-joon =

South Korean dancer (born 1979)

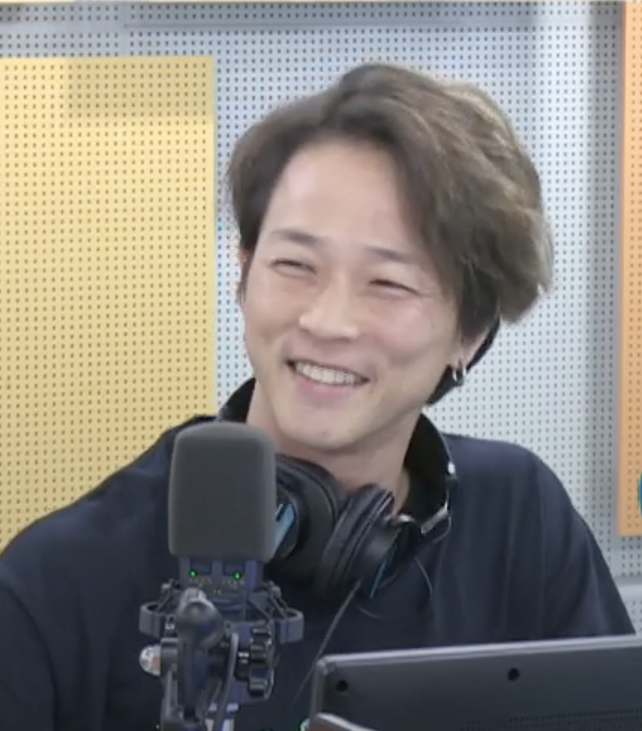
- Nam on SBS Radio in 2020
- Born: 30 January 1979 (age 47); Seoul, South Korea
- Other name: Poppin' Hyun Joon
- Occupations: Dancer; rapper; singer
- Known for: Popping techniques
- Spouse: Park Aeri
- Musical career
- Genres: Dance, urban, hip hop
- Years active: 1998–present
- Labels: Star Empire, Happy Face
- Formerly of: Young Turks Club, A-Force

- Nam Hyun-joon
- Hangul: 남현준
- Hanja: 南賢俊
- RR: Nam Hyeonjun
- MR: Nam Hyŏnjun

Nam Hyun-joon (Korean: 남현준; born 30 January 1979), often referred to as Poppin' Hyun Joon (팝핀현준), is a South Korean dancer, rapper and singer. Best known for his popping techniques, he is considered a pioneer of South Korean breakdancing.

== Biography ==
Nam Hyun-joon is famous for his explosive popping moves including:ticking, animation, tutting, and gliding. He is considered to be one of the most well-known poppin dancers worldwide breakdance leagues. Due to his well-known dancing abilities, he often trains stars and hired as a dance choreographer. He has been in several dance groups, including Cyborg G, FREEZE, and Newest35.

Nam married Korean folk singer Park Aeri in December 2010. He came back September 2015 in six years.

=== Fame ===
Following the disbandment of Young Turks Club, Nam made the decision to pursue professional dancing. His skill and smooth moves gained recognition from many Korean celebrities, most notably V.O.S member Choi Hyun-joon. Nam is influenced by the dance group Seo Taiji and Boys and was eventually featured in the music video "Amen" by Lee Juno.

Nam released a song titled 'Lion's Roar' in 2005 which lyrically describes his hardship and determination for dance. He steadily gained popularity in Korea during this time and performed at the 2006 FIFA World Cup. He is involved in a dance group called Nam Hyun-joon and Kids, which is a play on the name Seo Taiji and Boys.

Following the success of his previous single, Nam released his first hip-hop album, One & Only, in 2007. A music video for the lead single, "Don't Stop", was released and the song was promoted on televised music shows.

In late 2014, Nam won the National Creative-Economy Award for his artist entrepreneur company Poppin HyunJoon Art Company (PAC) and often appears in mainstream TV with his wife Park Aeri to promote the fusion combination of Arirang and Poppin.

On 31 July 2014, it was announced that Nam had parted ways with Star Empire Entertainment for Happy Face Entertainment.

== Filmography ==
=== Films ===
- Fly, Daddy, Fly (2006)
- Kung Fu Hip Hop (2008)
- The Wrath of Vajra (2013)

=== Dramas ===
- Over the Rainbow (2006)
- Poppin Hyun Joon – Poppin Dance Lecture (2007)
- Kungfu Hip Hop (2008)

=== Variety show ===
- King of Mask Singer (2020, MBC)

== Discography ==
=== Singles ===
- "Don't Stop" (2005)

=== Albums ===
Title	Album Details	Peak chart Positions	Sales
Title	Album Details	KOR	Sales
One & Only	Released: 8 May 2007; Label: Star Empire Entertainment; Format: CD, digital download	—	KOR: —

== Award and nominations ==
Year	Award	Category	Nominated work	Result	Ref.
2020	18th KBS Entertainment Awards	Top Excellence Award (Reality Category)	Mr. House Husband 2, Immortal Songs: Singing the Legend (with Park Ye-ri)	Won	
