= 2008 Nonhyeon-dong gosiwon murders =

Mass murder in Seoul, South Korea

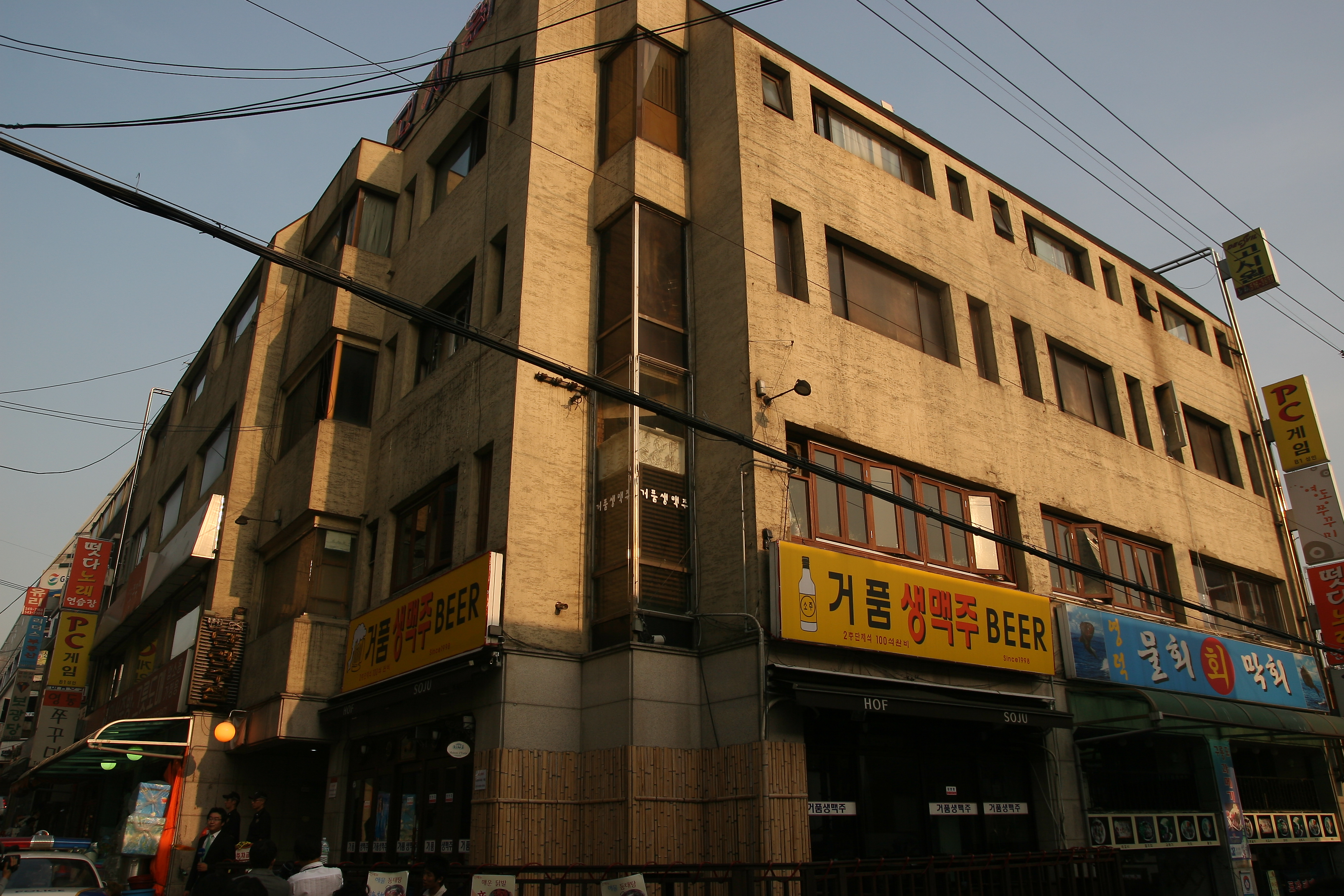
- Native name: 논현동 고시원 살인 사건
- Location: Nonhyeon, Seoul, South Korea
- Date: 20 October 2008; 8:15 a.m.–9:20 a.m. (KST)
- Attack type: mass stabbing, arson
- Weapons: Sashimi knife; Two fruit-knives; Tear gas gun
- Deaths: 6 (5 by stabbing, one by falling)
- Injuries: 7
- Perpetrator: Jeong Sang-jin
- Verdict: Guilty; sentenced to death
- Convictions: Murder (6 counts); Arson

On 20 October 2008, a mass stabbing and arson attack took place in Nonhyeon-dong, Seoul, South Korea. Thirty-year-old Jeong Sang-jin (정상진) set fire to his gosiwon apartment building and slashed several women with a sashimi knife. A total of six people died in the incident, and seven more were injured. Jeong was sentenced to death on 12 May 2009.

== Background ==
The murders took place at a four-story building in Seoul's inner Gangnam District. The third and fourth floor, as well as the rooftop, were part of a gosiwon, known by the designation D, which rents out low-cost single-room lodgings, most often used for short-term stays by students ahead of state exams and migrant workers. Of the 100 residents in the Nonhyeon-dong gosiwon, the majority were primarily ethnic Korean Chinese women who were employed at the nearby Yeongdong traditional market

== Details ==
At about 8:15 a.m., according to police, Jeong, who lived on the third floor of the gosiwon poured gasoline on his bed and set it ablaze. Dressed all in black, wearing a headlamp, and hiding his face with a balaclava and goggles, he emerged from his smoke-filled room and, armed with a sashimi knife, two fruit-knives strapped to his legs, and a tear gas gun in a belt holster, began slashing and stabbing the residents of the building who were fleeing the fire.

Five people died of the wounds Jeong had inflicted on them with his knife, one woman died when she jumped out of a window in the fourth floor in an attempt to escape, and another seven were injured, four seriously, either by Jeong or the fire. Three of the dead and three of the injured were Chinese citizens. The fire raged in the building for about 30 minutes, before around 100 firefighters finally succeeded in taming the flames.

At 9:20 a.m., Jeong, initially thought to be another victim, was rescued by a fireman from a storage room in the fourth floor where he was hiding. When police noticed his peculiar behavior, Jeong was interrogated at the scene and he confessed to the crime. He was immediately arrested and brought to Gangnam Police Station, where he was charged with on eleven counts, including murder, attempted murder, arson resulting in death and arson of a building.

== Perpetrator ==
Jeong Sang-jin (정상진) was born on 27 February 1978 in Hapcheon County, South Gyeongsang Province. He moved to Seoul in 2002. He lived at the gosiwon since his arrival and worked part-time jobs as a waiter, a parking valet and a food delivery man. Jeong had frequent financial difficulties and regularly borrowed money from a sister to pay for rent. He had been unemployed since April 2008 after quitting his waiter job. Around the same time, his family stopped sending him money. Jeong was noted for a suicide attempt in middle school, but never went to therapy. He had a criminal record for repeatedly failing to attend training during his mandatory service in the Republic of Korea Reserve Forces.

=== Motives ===
Police believe that Jeong killed indiscriminately without a specific target. At his trial, it was determined that he planned the attack after his latest criminal charge from 2007, related to his avoidance of military service, resulted in a ₩1,500,000 fine, which carried a mandatory prison sentence if not paid. Jeong decided to carry out the arson and stabbings prematurely when he fell behind on rent and faced imminent eviction, fearing that staff could discover the weapons he had already prepared. Following a psychiatric examination, which diagnosed him only with chronic depression, Jeong was declared sane, as he was otherwise aware of his actions and showed premeditation in the crime.

Further blame was also laid on the film A Bittersweet Life by Kim Jee-woon, which Jeong was said to like.

== Similar incidents ==
The incident sparked memories of the Daegu subway fire and the arson of the Namdaemun the same year, as well as the Akihabara massacre that happened just a few months earlier in Japan.
