= Shim Mina =

South Korean singer (born 1972)

- Born: Shim Mina (심민아, 沈敏雅); December 1, 1972 (age 53); Uijeongbu, South Korea
- Occupations: Model; singer; dancer
- Spouse: Ryu Philip (m. 2018)
- Musical career
- Genres: K-pop; dance-pop; R&B
- Years active: 2002–present
- Labels: EMI Korea; J-Entercom; Imagine Asia

Korean name
- Hangul: 심민아
- Hanja: 沈敏雅
- RR: Sim Mina
- MR: Sim Mina

Shim Mina (Korean: 심민아; born December 1, 1972), known simply as Mina (미나), is a South Korean singer and dancer. She rose to fame at the World Cup in 2002, eventually deciding to become a K-pop singer. Mina released her debut album Rendezvous in November 2002, which saw success in China and the Philippines.

On July 7, 2018, Mina married Ryu Philip, a member of boy band Tri:al (트라이얼), formerly known as SoReal (소리얼).

== Early life ==
Shim Mina was born on December 1, 1972 in Uijeongbu, Gyyeonggi. She initially found instant fame as "Miss World Cup" at the 2002 FIFA World Cup; when pictures of her with the "Be The Reds!" bandanna around her chest and the Korean flag used as a skirt were beamed around the world. Afterwards, she signed a record deal with J-Entercom Entertainment, and prepared to release her debut album.

== Career ==
=== 2002: Rendezvous ===
Shim Mina was first a backup dancer for various Korean pop artists such as Park Jin-young and Park Ji-yoon. Mina released her debut single 전화받어 ("Answer the Phone") in October 2002. She subsequently released her first album, Rendezvous later that month.

Answer the Phone became a chart-topping hit in the Philippines and is regarded as one of the first K-pop hits in the country despite most Filipinos mistaking the song's language for Spanish instead of Korean. An English-translated cover was performed by Roxanne Barcelo for her debut album Roxie in 2004.

=== 2004: Re:Turn 2 Mina and departure from J-Entercom Entertainment ===
After a two-year hiatus, Mina came back with her second album in 2004, titled Re:turn 2 Mina. She stated at the time that she wanted to be taken seriously as a singer, and no longer wanted to be known as "Miss World Cup". The lead single from the album, 돌아 ("Turn"), was a strong hit for Mina, as it was performed on SBS's Popular Song numerous times, which caused the song to enter the Top 5 of the Korean music charts. Promotion for the album was accompanied by live vocal performances of various songs from the album. This album proved to be more popular than her debut album, and sold many copies.

=== 2006: Signing with EMI Korea, Kiss Kiss, and Fly High ===
Mina signed with EMI Korea. and released her third album. Kiss Kiss in the fall of 2005 with an even sexier image. Mina trained in Europe to belly dance and made her music video for her title track there as well. The cover of the Turkish song, though, failed badly, with the album selling less than 10,000 copies. She has since released an English single for the European market, even going as far as making a MySpace page for the single. However, she has remained in Korea and promoted her last single Fly High during the 2006 FIFA World Cup as a tribute to the competition that started her career.

=== 2007–present: Minastasia, scandals, hiatus, comeback, and clothing line ===
In early 2007, EMI Korea announced Mina's 4th album, entitled Minastasia. The album was scheduled to be released in early April; however, the release of Minastasia was delayed until July 2007. In China, the album received an unexpected 180,000 pre-orders, making her a bonafide star in China. In Korea, the album had two singles to date: a song called "Look" featuring Ak'Sent, and "좋아" (OK) featuring Seungri of the Korean Pop group, Big Bang. Because of her relatively late debut, Mina initially claimed that she was born in 1978. As rumors of her real age began to spread, Mina eventually admitted that she was born in 1972 and apologized to the public and her fans for lying about it for so long. On November 17, 2008, Mina attended a TV program "JoyDancing" held by Oriental TV, Shanghai, China. She was accused of not respecting the competition with her dance moves (many see the claims as unfair) and finally got 0 points for her dance. Mina shed tears on the stage of the competition. In the fall of 2009, Mina returned to the K-Pop scene with her new single Doh Doh (도도), keeping her sexy image, but having a new electropop sound, rather than the usual R&B sound she has. The new single fared well with critics, and no news of a new album has been released at this time. Mina had also launched a clothing line named Tamina, which is now defunct.

== Discography ==
=== Studio albums ===
Title	Details	Sales
Rendezvous	Released: November 7, 2002; Formats: CD, digital download, streaming; Label: J-Entercom Entertainment	CHN: 200,000
Re:Turn 2 Mina	Released: May 6, 2004; Formats: CD, digital download, streaming; Label: Yedang Entertainment	
Kiss Kiss	Released: September 13, 2005; Formats: CD, digital download, streaming; Label: EMI Korea	
Minastasia	Released: July 25, 2007; Formats: CD, digital download, streaming; Label: EMI Korea	

=== Singles ===
- "Answer the Phone" (전화받어)
- "Fly High"
- "Ok" (좋아)
- "Doh Doh" (도도)

== Awards and nominations ==
Award ceremony	Year	Category	Nominee	Result	Ref.
Luxury Brand Model Awards	2015	Korean Wave Contribution Award	Shim Mina	Won	
MAMA Awards	2002	Best New Female Artist	"Answer the Phone"	Nominated	
Republic of Korea Peace Awards	2015	National Prestige Promotion	Shim Mina	Won	
