= Young Turks Club =

Korean musical group

- Also known as: YTC
- Origin: South Korea
- Genres: K-Pop; Ballad
- Years active: 1996–2012 (Note: The group had one-off reunions in 2015, 2018, 2020, 2022, and 2023.)
- Label: ING Entertainment
- Past members: Lim Sung-eun; Song Jin-ah; Han Hyun-nam; Ji Joon-goo; Choi Seung-min; Park Sung-hyun; Kim Duk-hyun; Nam Hyun-joon; Jeon Hyun-jung; Lee Min-kyung

Young Turks Club (영턱스클럽), also known as YTC, was a South Korean coed idol group that debuted in 1996. The group was produced by Lee Juno from Seo Taiji and Boys and had Lim Sung-eun, Song Jin-ah, Han Hyun-nam, Ji Joon-goo, and Choi Seung-min as its original members. As the word "turk" means "young dynamic person eager for change", their name Young Turks Club means "a group of active young people eager to change." On July 9, 1996, they made their debut stage on KMTV's Show! Music Tank with "Peek", the song didn't achieve success and failed to gain interest from the general public. They quickly changed to "Affection" a week later and rose to stardom. Their song "Affection" was their first release to become widely popular in Korea. In a 2023 post by Rolling Stone, the song was ranked number 58 in The 100 Best Korean Pop Songs Of All Time.

The group won the new artist award at the Seoul Music Awards in 1996.

== Members ==
- Lim Sung-eun (임성은) (1996-1997, 2015, 2018)
- Song Jin-ah (송진아) (1996-2000, 2018, 2022)
- Han Hyun-nam (한현남) (1996-2012, 2015, 2018, 2022)
- Ji Joon-goo (지준구) (1996-1998, 2002-2004)
- Choi Seung-min (최승민) (1996-1998, 2002-2012, 2015, 2018, 2022)
- Park Sung-hyun (박성현) (1997-1998, 2002-2012, 2015, 2018, 2022)
- Kim Duk-hyun (김덕현) (1998)
- Nam Hyun-joon (남현준) (1998)
- Jeon Hyun-jung (전현정) (1998-2000)
- Lee Min-kyung (이민경) (2011-2012)

== Discography ==
=== Studio albums ===
Title	Album details
영턱스 클럽	Released: August 1, 1996; Label: -; Format: CD; Track listing: 1. Young Turks (Intro); 2. 훔져보기 (Peek); 3. 내 영훈 속에 너 4. 서로에게 길들여 질때 까지; 5. 정 (Affection); 6. 못난이 콤플렉스 (Ugly Complex); 7. Rain (비의 테마); 8. 홈져보기 (Funky Mix) (Peek (Funky Mix)); 9. 정 (Club Mix) (Affection (Club Mix)); 10. 못난이 콤플렉스 (Ivy Remix) (Ugly Complex ((Ivy Remix)); 11. Don't Ask Me (House Remix)
Young Turks Club 2nd Album	Released: May 5, 1997; Label: -; Format: CD; Track listing: 1. 타인 (Strangers); 2. Summer Love; 3. Love Designer; 4. Happy Birthday; 5. 질투 (Jealousy); 6. 아쉬움 (성은이의 노래); 7. 우리들이 있잖아; 8. Dance Beat
햐안전쟁	Released: December 26, 1997; Label: -; Format: CD; Track listing: 1. Dream; 2. 하얀전쟁 (White War); 3. 우연이 준 선물; 4. 졸업의 눈물; 5. 어느 프로포즈; 6. 넌 더 이상 친구가 아니야; 7. The Day; 8. 친구가 될께; 9. Come Back To Me; 10. 그해 겨울은 따뜻했지; 11. 돌아와; 12. 1004
아시나요	Released: October 30, 1998; Label: -; Format: CD
From Dawning to Now	Released: May 24, 2000; Label: -; Format: CD
Upgrade to No.1	Released: April 15, 2003; Label: -; Format: CD
Rainbow. No.7	Released: March 26, 2004; Label: -; Format: CD
Slap Shot	Released: June 12, 2008; Label: -; Format: CD
