= M. Street =

South Korean boy band

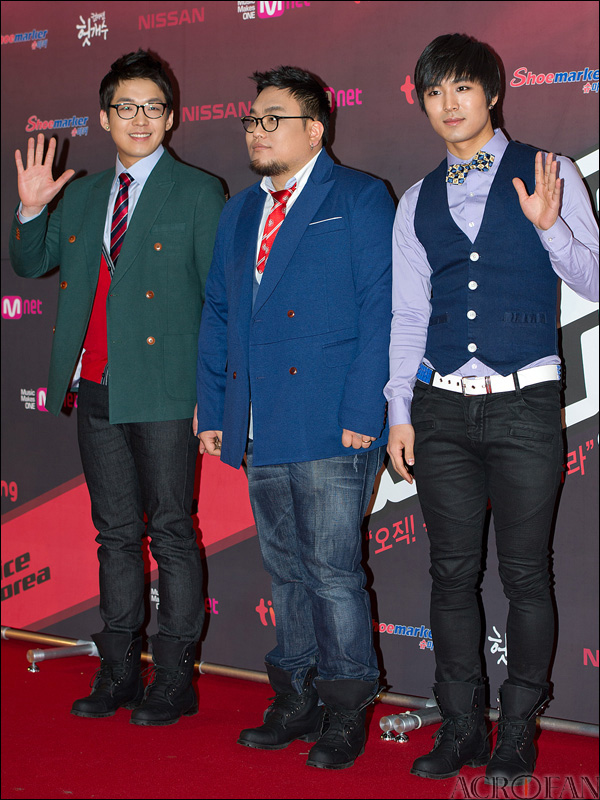
- M. Street in 2011. From left to right: Seul, Gwang To, W.

Background information
- Origin: Seoul, South Korea
- Genres: K-Pop, Ballad, R&B
- Years active: 2004–2009; 2011–2012; 2019
- Labels: Danal Entertainment (2003-2004; 2007-2009); Doremi Records (2005) (2011-????); HIT ENT (????-present)
- Members: Gwang To; Seul; Han Changhee; Seong Jinyoung
- Past members: Lee Seohyun; W.

M. Street (Hangul: 엠스트리트) is a South Korean ballad group. They made their debut in 2004, with the album Boy Story in the City. The group held their first solo concert 7 months later.

On December 1, 2008, Lee Seohyun was found dead after committing suicide. The group's final single with Seohyun, titled "Forever", was released posthumously on January 20, 2009.

In 2011, the group reformed as a trio with Gwangto, Seul, and new member W. of R.Tripper. On August 17, the group made their return with the song "Ask," released as part of the OST for the Korean series Protect the Boss. In September 2011, the group released their reunion song "Loosen the Necktie", which charted #84 on Billboard's "Korea K-pop Hot 100." While promoting the single, the group began performing in Japan for the first time in their career. The group released their single "My Angel," on February 9, 2012. On August 21, W enlisted in the military while the rest of the group went on hiatus.

In May 2019, the group returned with single Endless Way, featuring the surviving members of the original lineup. The group also announced that they would be releasing a steady stream of music through the year.

== Discography ==
=== Albums ===
- Boy Story in the City (2004)

=== Single albums ===
- Forever (2009)
- Loosen the Necktie (2011)
- Love You...Loved You (2011)
- You Hate Me (2011)

=== Singles ===
- "Start" (2005)
- "Together" (2006)
- "Tension" (2007)
- "The Gift of the Sun" (2008)
- "My Angel" (2012)
- "Endless Way" (2019)
- "Missing You" (2019)
