= Timeline of Korean history =

This is a timeline of Korean history.

== Early history ==
- 8000 BC: Beginning of the Jeulmun pottery period.
- 2337 BC: Legendary establishment of Tamna by Go, Yang, and Bu on Jeju Island.
- 2333 BC: Legendary establishment of Gojoseon by Dangun.
- 1500 BC: Beginning of the Mumun pottery period.
- 800 BC: Historian Richard McBride posits that the historical founding of Old Chosŏn as a polity likely began around this time.
- 700 BC: Beginning of the Liaoning bronze dagger culture.
- 323 BC: Estimated beginning of the Gojoseon-Yan War that eventually ends in Gojoseon's loss of the Liaodong peninsula to Yan.
- 300 BC: Beginning of the Iron Age.
- 300 BC: Establishment of Jin in southern Korean peninsula.

== Proto-Three Kingdoms ==
- 200 BC: Buyeo, which Goguryeo and Baekje claim descent from, is established sometime around the 2nd century BC.
- 195 BC: Establishment of Wiman Joseon.
- 108 BC: Han dynasty destroys Wiman Joseon, establishing four commanderies in northern Korean Peninsula.
- 57 BC: Traditional date for the founding of Silla by Bak Hyeokgeose, who is elected leader.
- 37 BC: Traditional date for the founding of Goguryeo by Jumong, a Prince of Buyeo.
- 18 BC: Traditional date for the founding of Baekje by Onjo, a Buyeo Nobleman or the third son of Jumong according to different sources.
- 17 BC: The oldest known Korean song, Song of the Yellow Bird is written by Yuri of Goguryeo.

== Three Kingdoms ==
- 42 AD: Traditional date for the founding of Gaya by Suro.
- 53: Goguryeo begins to become a centralized kingdom under Taejo's reign.
- 234: Baekje begins to become a centralized kingdom under Goi's reign.
- 244: Goguryeo is defeated by Cao Wei in the Goguryeo–Wei War.
- 313: Goguryeo destroys Lelang Commandery, ending the last of the four Han Chinese commanderies established by the Han dynasty.
- 356: Silla becomes a centralized kingdom under Naemul's reign.
- 371: Baekje's King Geunchogo invades Goguryeo and kills King Gogugwon.
- 372: Under Sosurim, Goguryeo imports Buddhism from Former Qin of China and adopts it as state sponsored religion.
- 372: Sosurim also establishes Korea's first National Confucian Academy.
- 384: Chimnyu of Baekje officially adopts Buddhism.
- 392: Gwanggaeto the Great of Goguryeo begins his reign, expanding Goguryeo into a major regional power.
- 413: Jangsu of Goguryeo erects the Gwanggaeto Stele.
- 433: Baekje and Silla form an alliance against Goguryeo's aggression.
- 475: Goguryeo attacks Baekje and captures Hanseong (modern day Seoul). Baekje moves its capital south to Ungjin (modern-day Gongju) due to Goguryeo's pressure.
- 494: Last remains of Buyeo absorbed by Goguryeo.
- 498: Baekje attacks Tamna (modern-day Jeju Province), which enters into a tributary relationship with Baekje as a result.
- 512: Silla vassalizes Usan (modern-day Ulleungdo).
- 520: Silla formalizes the Bone-rank system, an aristocratic rank system that acted as a caste system under the reign of Beopheung of Silla.
- 527: Silla formally adopts Buddhism after Beopheung of Silla executes Ichadon, a Buddhist convert who had tried to persuade the king to adopt Buddhism. Before he was executed, Ichadon predicted that milk colored blood would spill from his body after his death. This supposed miracle allegedly occurred according to the Samguk yusa and convinced Silla's royal court to adopt Buddhism as its state religion.
- 538: Baekje moves its capital to Sabi (modern-day Buyeo).
- 553: Silla attacks Baekje, breaking the alliance.
- 562: Silla completes annexation of Gaya.
- 598: First of a series of major Sui dynasty attacks in the Goguryeo–Sui War, which ends in 614 in a costly defeat for Sui.
- 612: Goguryeo repulses second Sui invasion at the Salsu.
- 631: Goguryeo builds the first Cheolli Jangseong following Tang incursions into Goguryeo's northwestern border.
- 645: First campaign in the Goguryeo–Tang War.
- 648: Silla establishes alliance with Tang.
- 660: Baekje falls to the Silla-Tang forces.
- 662: As a result of the fall of Baekje, Tamna enters into a tributary relationship with Silla.
- 663: Battle of Baekgang, the remnants of Baekje allied with Japanese expeditionary forces are defeated by the Silla-Tang alliance, ending all hopes for the restoration of the kingdom.
- 668: Goguryeo falls to the Silla-Tang forces.

== North–South States period and Later Three Kingdoms ==
- 676: Silla repels Chinese forces from the Korean peninsula, completes unification of much of the Three Kingdoms following the Silla-Tang War and successfully defends its independence.
- 698: The founding of Balhae by former Goguryeo general Dae Joyeong.
- 751: Silla, at its cultural peak, constructs Seokguram and Bulguksa.
- 828: Chang Pogo establishes Cheonghaejin, a major center of trade with China, Japan, and Vietnam.
- 830: Balhae reaches its peak under King Seon of Balhae.
- 892: Silla begins to lose control of parts of the peninsula as the brief Later Three Kingdoms period begins.
- 897: Queen Jinseong of Silla dies. She was the third and last queen regnant in Korean history.
- 900: Hubaekje ("Later Baekje") established in the southwest of the peninsula.
- 901: Taebong ("Later Goguryeo") established in the northwest of the peninsula.
- 918: Founding of Goryeo by Taejo of Goryeo.
- 926: Balhae falls to Khitan forces.
- 935: Silla formally surrenders to Goryeo.
- 936: Hubaekje formally surrenders to Goryeo.

== Goryeo ==
- 936: Goryeo completes the reunification of the Later Three Kingdoms, absorbing the entirety of Hubaekje and parts of former Balhae territory.
- 937: Tae Kwanghyŏn, the last Crown Prince of Balhae, flees to Goryeo with a great portion of the Balhae royalty and aristocracy and settles with tens of thousands of Balhae households there.
- 938: Goryeo subjugates Tamna.
- 956: Emperor Gwangjong forces major land and slavery reforms, and in 958 implements civil service examinations.
- 979: According to the Goryeosa, tens of thousands of Balhae refugees from Jeongan flee to Goryeo, marking the largest Balhae migration since the 936 exodus.
- 986: Jeongan falls to the Liao dynasty.
- 993: The first of three Goryeo–Khitan Wars.
- 1010: The second ravages the northern border.
- 1018: The third, Khitan successfully repelled.
- 1033: Goryeo builds the second Cheolli Jangseong (lit. "Thousand Li Wall"), also known as the Goryeo Jangseong, a massive wall running along the northern border.
- 1135: Buddhist monk and geomancer Myocheong rebels in a failed attempt to move the capital to Pyongyang and pursue aggressive expansion against the Jin dynasty.
- 1145: Kim Pusik compiles the Samguk sagi, Korea's oldest extant history text.
- 1170: Yi Ŭi-bang overthrows Uijong of Goryeo, beginning a century of military rule known as the Goryeo military regime.
- 1231: The Mongol invasions of Korea begin and will continue intermittently until 1259.
- 1234: Ch'oe Yun-ŭi's Sangjeong Gogeum Yemun is published, world's first metal-block printed text.
- 1251: Goryeo completes the Tripitaka Koreana, the most comprehensive and oldest intact version of the Buddhist canon in Chinese script.
- 1270: Goryeo signs a peace treaty with the Mongols, beginning an 80-year period of Yuan overlordship. The Sambyeolcho Rebellion lasts for three more years.
- 1274: Goryeo helps the Mongol Empire during the Mongol invasions of Japan.
- 1285: Il-yeon compiles the Samguk yusa, record of history and legends.
- 1356: Goryeo regains its independence under the reign of King Gongmin of Goryeo and momentarily conquers Liaoyang.
- 1388: General Yi Sŏng-gye, ordered to engage China in a border dispute, turns his troops against the Goryeo court.

== Joseon ==
- 1392: Yi Sŏnggye is crowned King Taejo, officially beginning the Joseon dynasty.
- 1394: Capital moved to Hanyang (now Seoul).
- 1395: The palace Gyeongbokgung is established in Hanyang.
- 1398
  - The First Strife of the Princes occurs.
  - The capital is moved back to Kaesong.
- 1400: The Second Strife of the Princes occurs.
- 1402: Paper currency initiated
- 1405
  - The capital is moved back to Hanyang.
  - The palace Changdeokgung is established in Hanyang.
- 1412–1414: Namdaemun Market, now the oldest extant market in Korea, is established.
- 1418: Sejong the Great ascends the throne.
- 1420: The government research institute Hall of Worthies is established.
- 1424: Goryeosa compiled.
- 1426: Two fires destroy much of Hanyang.
- 1446: The Hangul alphabet, created 3 years earlier, is promulgated by King Sejong the Great.
- 1586: Local nobleman Yi Ŭngt'ae dies, leaving a pregnant widow and a child named Wŏn behind. His widow leaves a grief-stricken letter in his tomb that is later discovered in 1998 and becomes famous internationally.

=== Imjin War ===
- 1592: The Imjin War begins.
  - 4th month. All the palaces in Seoul are burnt down.
  - 1597: The Chŏngyu War begins.
- 1593: The war causes the Kyegap Famine (계갑대기근; 癸甲大飢饉) to begin. It lasts until 1594.
- 1597: António Corea, a Korean slave kidnapped and taken to Japan, is sold to an Italian master. He is then taken to Italy at latest by 1600, and becomes possibly the first Korean to set foot in Europe.

=== Late Joseon period ===
- 1626–1627: Pyŏngjŏng Famine (병정대기근; 丙丁大飢饉).
- 1627: The Later Jin invasion of Joseon occurs.
- 1636: The Qing invasion of Joseon ends in Joseon's defeat, and Korea is made a tributary of Qing China.
- 1653: Dutch mariner Hendrick Hamel becomes stranded on Jeju Island. The isolationist Joseon government prevents him from leaving, although he is given relative freedom to live normally on the peninsula.
- 1666: Hamel and some of his crew escape Korea to Japan, then back to the Netherlands. Hamel then publishes the first eyewitness description of Korea by a Westerner.
- 1762: Crown Prince Sado is ordered to commit suicide by his father Yeongjo of Joseon.
- 1791: Persecution of Catholicism begins.
- 1809: A crop failure leds to famine that lasts until 1815 and kills around 2,000,000.
- 1810: A M_{w} 7.3 earthquake strikes present-day North Hamgyong Province, damaging towns and killing residents.
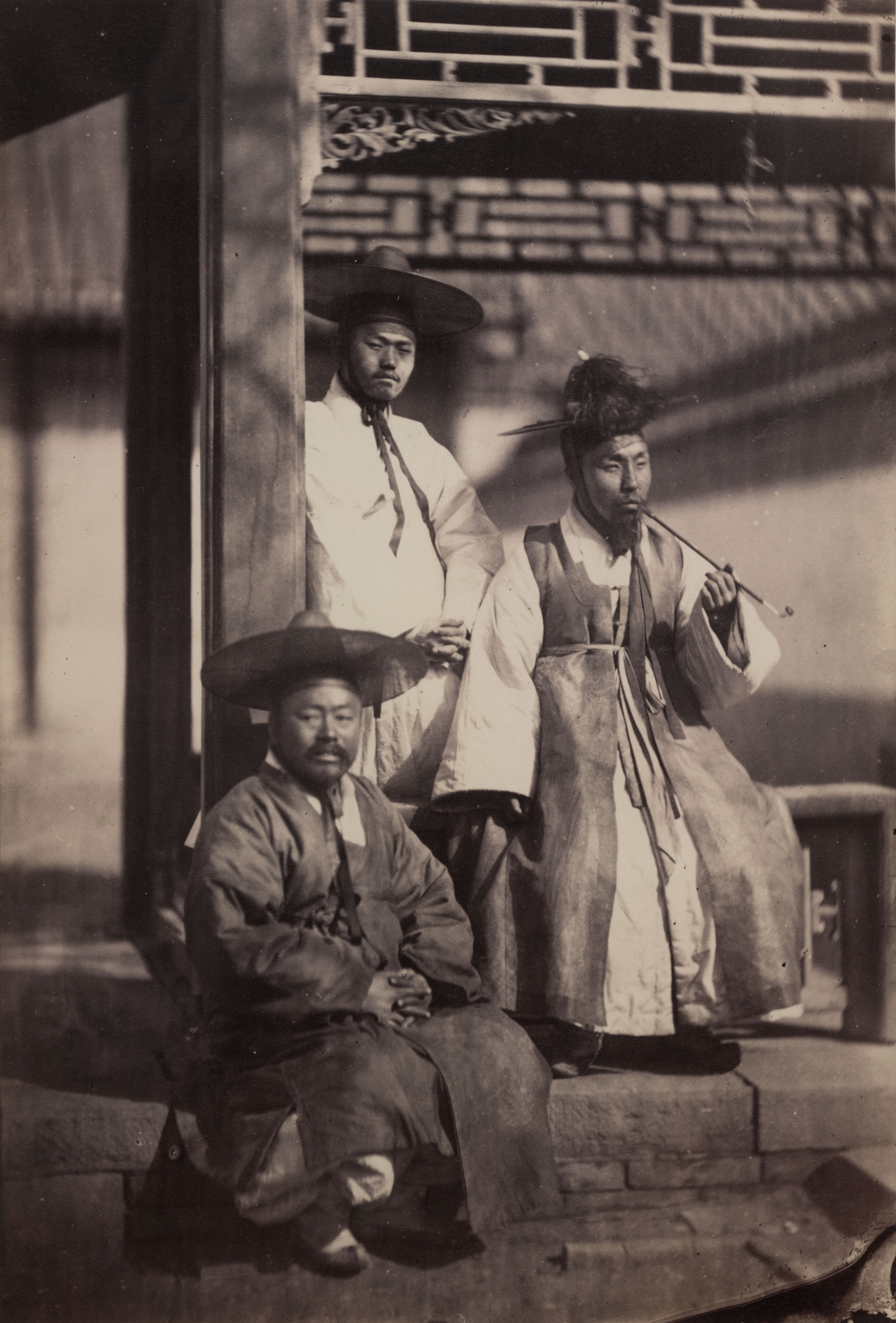
- One of the first known photos of Koreans (1863)
  1863:
  - Some of the earliest known photographs of Koreans appear.
  - Gojong ascends the throne with his father, Daewongun, as Regent.
- 1866: 11 October – 22 November. The French conduct a punitive campaign in Korea, but eventually retreat without concessions from the Korean government.
- 1869: Famine in northern Korea that causes Koreans to flee to Russia.
- 1871: United States expedition to Korea.
- 1873: The palace Gyeongbokgung is reconstructed after having been abandoned since the Imjin War.
- 1876: Korean ports are formally opened under the Treaty of Ganghwa with Imperial Japan.
- 1881: 10 December. Japanese newspaper Chōsen shinpō becomes the first newspaper to be published in Korea.
- 1882: Imo Incident: Mutiny by Korean soldiers in Seoul against the modernization policies of King Gojong.
- 1883
  - July to October. The first Korean diplomatic mission to the United States also gives rise to the first Koreans to set foot in North America, the first Korean to study abroad in the United States (Yu Kil-chun), and the first Koreans to circumnavigate the globe (Min Yong Ik, Pyŏn Su, and Soh Kwang-pom).
  - 31 October. The first native Korean newspaper, Hansŏng sunbo, is established by the Joseon monarchy. It is written in Classical Chinese.
- 1884: The three-day Kapsin Coup begins and fails.
- 1885: 11 October. The first Methodist church in Korea, Chungdong First Methodist Church, is established. The church's main chapel, built in 1897, is now the oldest extant church in Korea, and the only extant one built in the 19th century.
- 1886: 25th day, 1st month. The government newspaper Hansŏng jubo is established. It is the first newspaper written primarily in the Korean language (mixed script) and the first weekly newspaper in Korea.
- 1887: The first electric light in Korea is lit in Gyeongbokgung.
- 1894: The beginning of the Donghak Peasant Rebellion prompts the Kabo Reforms in an attempt to prevent Korea's colonization, and China and Japan fight over sovereignty of Korea in the First Sino-Japanese War.
- 1895
  - Ae Kwan Theater, the first movie theater in Korea, is established in Incheon.
  - April. After Japanese victory in the Sino–Japanese War, China recognizes Korean independence in the Treaty of Shimonoseki.
  - 8 October. Empress Myeongseong is assassinated by Japanese agents.
- 1896
  - 1 January. Joseon begins to use the Gregorian calendar.
  - 7 April. Tongnip sinmun, the first private modern Korean newspaper, is founded.
  - 11 February. Gojong's internal exile to the Russian legation.

== Korean Empire ==
- 1897
  - 20 February. King Gojong leaves the Russian legation and makes Deoksugung his official palace.
  - 11 October. King Gojong proclaims the Korean Empire and is crowned at the religious shrine Hwangudan in Seoul.
- 1898: January. Independence Gate is constructed in Seoul.
- 1903: The first Korean immigrants to the United States arrive in Hawaii.
- 1904
  - 18 July. Landmark newspaper The Korea Daily News, predecessor to today's Seoul Shinmun, is founded by British journalist Ernest Bethell.
  - Philip Jaisohn becomes the first ethnic Korean to obtain a Western doctorate degree.
  - Imun Seolnongtang, now the oldest continually operating restaurant in South Korea, opens around this time in Seoul.
- 1905
  - 8 May. Koreans arrive in Mexico for the first time.
  - Treaty of Portsmouth ends the Russo-Japanese War in Russian defeat and leads to uncontested Japanese dominance of Korean politics
  - Japan–Korea Treaty of 1905. After being forced to sign the treaty, Korea becomes a protectorate of the Empire of Japan.
- 1906
  - Kim Ransa becomes the first Korean woman to receive a bachelor's degree from the United States.
  - 1 September. The historic Japanese newspaper in Korea Keijō nippō is founded. The newspaper becomes the de facto official paper of the Japanese Residency-General and later Government-General.
- 1907
  - February. The National Debt Repayment Movement begins. It ends by 1908.
  - June. The Hague Secret Emissary Affair occurs, in which emissaries from Gojong attempt to assert Korea's independence in Europe, but are rebuffed.
  - 18 July. Gojong is forced by Japan to abdicate in favor of his son, Emperor Sunjong.
  - 9 September – 15 November. The Kyŏngsŏng Exhibition (경성박람회; 京城博覽會) is held in Seoul.
- 1908: 23 March. Durham Stevens, an American diplomat and Japanese sympathizer, is assassinated by Korean independence activists.
- 1909
  - 15 October. The first Korean-owned private regional newspaper Gyeongnam Ilbo is established.
  - 26 October. The Japanese Resident-General of Korea Itō Hirobumi is assassinated by Korean independence activist An Jung-geun.
- 1910: 29 August. The Japan–Korea Treaty of 1910 started the annexation of the Korean Empire by Imperial Japan.

== Japanese colonial period ==
- 1911
  - The 105-Man Incident occurs, in which the Japanese arrest over 700 Koreans in connection to alleged assassination attempts on the Governor-General of Korea, Terauchi Masatake.
  - The Korean enclave Sinhanch'on is established in Vladivostok in Russia. It becomes a hub of the Korean independence movement until it is dissolved in 1937.
  - Kwŏnŏphoe, which became the de facto representative organization for Koreans in the Russian Empire, is founded in Sinhanch'on. They secretly operate the Korean Independence Army Government and build an army using Russian government funds, but are eventually dissolved in 1917 after Japanese pressure on Russia.
- 1915: 9 September – 30 October. The Chōsen Industrial Exhibition is held at the former royal palace Gyeongbokgung.
- 1919
  - 21 January. Gojong suddenly dies. He was and is still widely believed to have been poisoned by Japan.
  - 1 February. The Muo Declaration of Independence is issued in Manchuria. It is the first such declaration of independence issued by Koreans, although its existence was then and remains relatively unknown.
  - 8 February. Inspired by the promotion of self-determination laid out in the Fourteen Points statement, Korean independence activists in Japan publish a February 8 Declaration of Independence. This directly inspires a similar act in Korea three weeks later.
  - 1 March. With the proclamation of the Korean Declaration of Independence, the March First Movement begins.
  - 11 April. The Korean Provisional Government (KPG) is established in exile in Shanghai, and Syngman Rhee is elected its first leader.
  - 15 April. The Jeamni massacre occurs, during which Japanese soldiers lure Korean civilians into a church, kill them, and burn the building to destroy their bodies.
  - September. Governor-General of Chōsen Hasegawa Yoshimichi resigns and Saitō Makoto replaces him. The period of "cultural rule" (文化政治; bunka seiji) begins.
  - 27 October. The kino-drama, Righteous Revenge, widely considered the first Korean film, premieres at Dansungsa. This marks the anniversary of the modern Korean Film Day, although whether it is truly the first Korean film has been disputed.
- 1920
  - As part of the cultural rule policies, permission is granted for several Korean-owned newspapers to be founded. The Chosun Ilbo is established on 5 March and The Dong-A Ilbo on 1 April.
  - 4 April. The Shinhanchon Incident occurs, in which an estimated several hundred Koreans are massacred by the Japanese army in Vladivostok, Far Eastern Republic.
  - 4–6 June. The Battle of Samdunja occurs between Korean rebels and the Empire of Japan.
  - 6–7 June. The Battle of Fengwudong occurs between Korean rebels and the Empire of Japan.
  - September. The controversial Hunchun incident . Japanese authorities claim Korean rebels attacked a Japanese consulate in Manchuria on this date, but debate continues as to what happened.
  - October. The Gando Massacre occurs in Manchuria, where Japanese soldiers kill, rape, and steal from thousands of Korean civilians.
  - 21–26 October. The Battle of Qingshanli between the Imperial Japanese Army and the Korean Independence Army (led by Kim Chwajin) takes place. Both sides claim victory.
  - November. The first time a Korean journalist is killed while reporting: The Dong-a Ilbo journalist Chang Tŏk-chun is killed by Japanese soldiers while investigating a Japanese massacre of Koreans in Hunchun, Manchuria.
- 1921
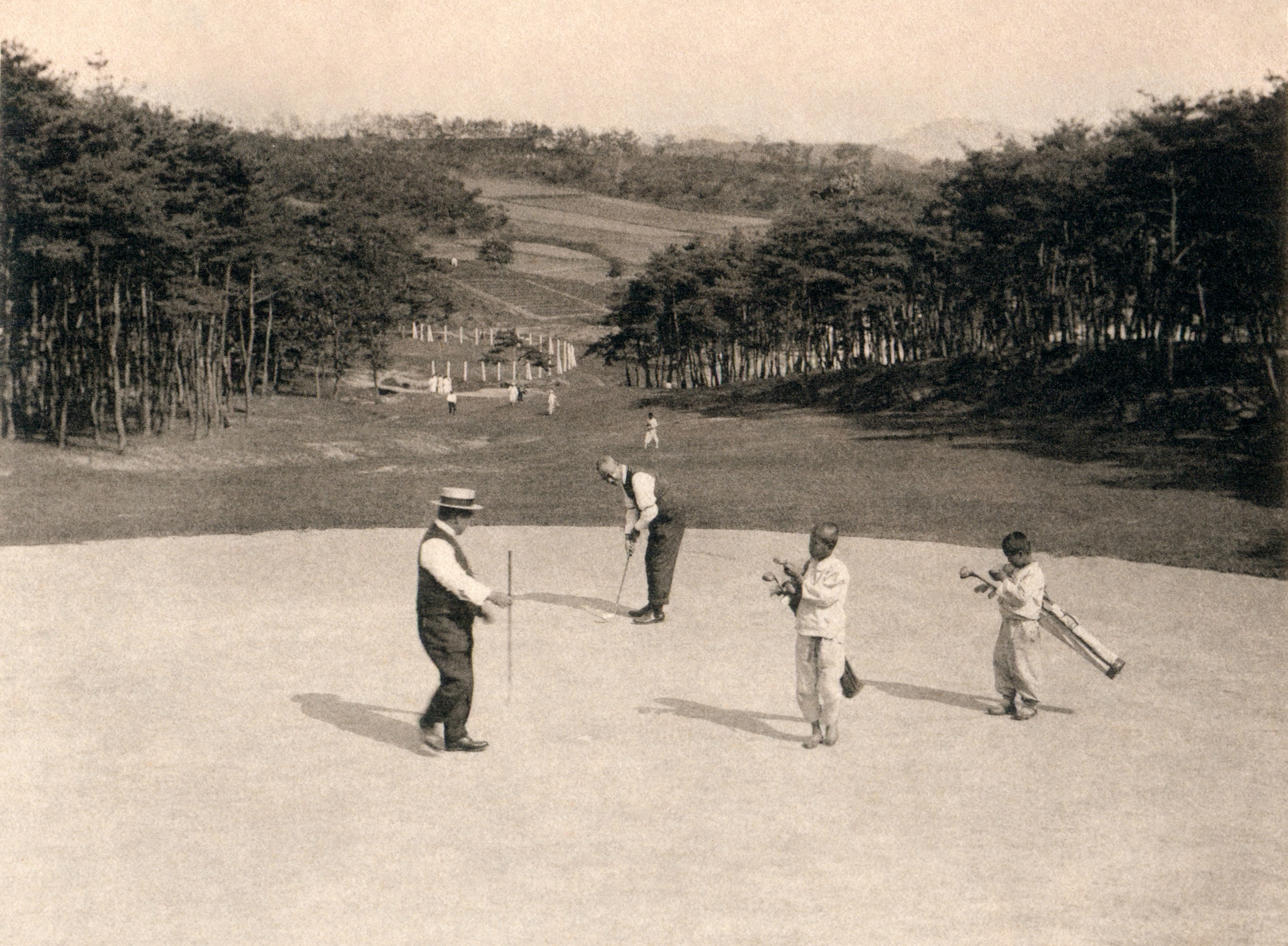
  - The first golf course in Korea at what is now Hyochang Park. It was established by the Japanese, who left the graves of Korean royal family members directly on the course (fenced-off area in center of photo; photo published 1925)
    June. The first golf course in Korea is established at Hyochangwon by the Japanese colonial government. The tombs of Joseon royal family members are controversially left directly on the course.
  - 28 June. The Free City Incident occurs, where Soviet forces kill Korean militants who refuse to surrender to them.
- 1922
  - The Chōsen Art Exhibition is held for the first time. After 1945, it was succeeded by the Republic of Korea Art Exhibition.
  - 10 December. An Chang-nam becomes the first Korean to fly a plane in Korea.
- 1923
  - 1 March. The Koryo-saram newspaper Sŏnbong is established. It changed names to the Lenin Kichi in 1938 and Koryo Ilbo in 1991. As of 2023, it is the oldest active Korean-language newspaper outside of the Korean peninsula.
  - 1 September. In the immediate aftermath of the Great Kantō earthquake in Japan, the Kantō Massacre occurs, and thousands of ethnic Koreans and others are massacred based on false rumors.
  - 1 December. The Government-General of Chōsen Library is established as part of the cultural rule movement. It is eventually succeeded by the National Library of Korea after liberation.
- 1924: 9 April. The Chōsen Folk Art Museum is established at Gyeongbokgung.
- 1925: February. Kwon Ki-ok becomes the first female Korean aviator after attending a pilot training school in China.
- 1926
  - 10 June. The June Tenth Movement pro-independence protests occur and are suppressed.
  - 1 October. The Government-General of Chōsen Building is completed in Gyeongbokgung.
- 1929:
  - 12 September – 31 October. The Chōsen Exhibition is held at Gyeongbokgung.
  - 30 October. The Gwangju Student Independence Movement begins, and is suppressed soon afterwards.
- 1931: The Korean Patriotic Organization (KPO) is founded.
- 1932
  - 9 January. The Sakuradamon incident occurs, in which KPO member Lee Bong-chang fails in his attempt to assassinate Emperor Hirohito in Tokyo.
  - 29 April. The Hongkou Park Incident occurs, in which Yun Bong-gil sets off a bomb in a park in Shanghai (now Lu Xun Park), killing several Japanese colonial and military leadership. In the aftermath, the KPG is forced to flee Shanghai.
  - Japan begins the "comfort women" program, in which civilian women were coerced or forced into prostitution for the Japanese military. By the end of World War II, an estimated 100,000–200,000 Korean women would be forced into sexual slavery by Imperial Japan.
- 1935: 3 November. Runner Sohn Kee-chung becomes the first Korean to win an Olympic gold medal, and sets a world record time. However, Sohn begrudgingly competed as an athlete of the Empire of Japan. The Dong-A Ilbo removes the Japanese flag from his uniform in an image, which leads to retaliation from the colonial government.
- 1937
  - 4 June. Kim Il Sung leads 150–200 guerrillas in the Battle of Pochonbo.
  - September. The deportation of Koreans in the Soviet Union occurs, in which roughly 172,000 Koryo-saram are forced to move from the Russian Far East to Central Asia. Many die on the journey.
  - November/December. The KPG flees Nanjing just weeks before the Nanjing Massacre.
- 1938
  - 1 March. Samsung is established in Daegu.
  - The Governor-General of Korea enacts the Sōshi-kaimei policy, under which Koreans are pressured and incentivized to adopt Japanese-style names.
- 1939
  - The State General Mobilization Law is passed, and millions of Koreans are forcefully conscripted to work for Japan. Tens of thousands die due to poor work conditions.
  - The KPG settles in Chongqing, where they would remain until the end of the war.
- 1940
  - The Japanese colonial government enacts the One Province, One Company (1道1社; 1도 1사) policy, under which both Japanese and Korean newspapers are forced to consolidate or close. The pro-Japanese Maeil Sinbo becomes the only major Korean-language newspaper left in Korea.
  - 1 September. The Chōsen Grand Exposition is held.
  - 17 September. The KPG establishes the Korean Liberation Army, a guerrilla army that was intended to eventually fight to liberate the Korean peninsula.
  - Kim Il Sung and a few surviving rebels escape from China into the USSR.
- 1942: October. The Korean Language Society incident occurs, under which members of the Korean Language Society are arrested and tortured on suspicion that they are Korean independence activists.
- 1943:
  - 27 November. The Cairo Declaration between China, the United States, and the United Kingdom announces the intention of the Allies to liberate Korea after World War II, but place it under a trusteeship. This both excites and angers Koreans.
- 1944: Starting in 1944, Japan started the conscription of Koreans into the armed forces.
- 1945 (before liberation)
  - 8 February. At the Yalta Conference, Roosevelt secretly proposes to Joseph Stalin that Korea be placed under a three-way trusteeship, and Stalin mostly agrees.
  - May. The Eagle Project, a joint operation between the KPG and the United States Office of Strategic Services, begins. The mission is halted in late August.
  - July. It is decided during the Potsdam Conference and announced via the Potsdam Declaration that the Cairo Declaration's terms on Korea would be affirmed.
  - 24 July. The Bumingwan bombing incident occurs at the building Bumingwan in Seoul.
  - 11 August. The General Order No. 1, drafted by the United States, specified the division of Korea at the 38th parallel. Stalin did not object to the terms.
  - 11 August. Soviet troops begin their first military operation in Korea, and land in Unggi County (later renamed Sonbong-guyok). Chŏng Sangjin is the only ethnic Korean among the Soviet troops there.
  - 13–17 August. The Seishin Operation is fought between the Soviet Union and Japan, with the Soviets winning.

== Division of Korea ==
- 1945 (after liberation)
  - 15 August. The surrender of Japan and the liberation of Korea. The Korean peninsula is haphazardly divided along the 38th parallel into the Soviet Civil Administration (SCA) in the North and the United States Army Military Government in Korea (USAMGIK) in the South.
  - 6 September. Before both trusteeships are well-established, Lyuh Woon-hyung establishes an independent People's Republic of Korea that incorporates both left- and right-leaning politicians. However, its activities are quickly suppressed and it never gains recognition from either the USSR or US.
  - 19 September. Kim Il Sung returns to the Korean peninsula with the Soviets.
  - 10 October. The League of Koreans in Japan is established.
  - December. At the Moscow Conference, negotiations to reunify Korea fail. Instead, Korea is placed under a four-way trusteeship, by the Soviet Union, the United States, the United Kingdom, and China for five years. This leads to protest and anger in the Korean peninsula.
- 1946
  - 4 January. Cho Man-sik, Kim's main rival for leadership in the North, is removed from office and placed under house arrest by the Soviets.
  - 8 February. The Provisional People's Committee of North Korea is established, and Kim Il Sung is made its chairman. While it supposedly represents all political groups in the North, it is dominated by the Soviet-backed Communist Party.
  - 1 July. North Korea creates its first film: Our Construction.
  - December. A coalition is made in the North among all major political parties, including representatives of left-leaning parties in the South. This coalition is again dominated by the Communists.
- 1947
  - Hyundai is established, initially as a construction company.
  - 19 July. Lyuh Woon-hyung, whom some Americans had been eyeing as a more moderate alternative candidate for leadership in the South, is assassinated by a member of the far-right terrorist group the White Shirts Society.
  - 14 November. The United Nations passes General Assembly Resolution 112, which creates the United Nations Temporary Commission on Korea. The Soviets dispute the authority of the commission and ignore it.
- 1948
  - April. Protests occur in Jeju that lead to the Jeju Uprising and are violently suppressed by 1949. The estimated death toll is uncertain, but a significant portion (up to 30%) of the population is killed. This event and its aftermath significantly threaten the Jeju language, which as of 2023, is considered critically endangered.
  - 10 May. Despite significant controversy, elections for the National Assembly are held in South Korea, and Syngman Rhee becomes its chair.
  - 15 August. Establishment of South Korea with Syngman Rhee as president.
  - 9 September. Establishment of North Korea with Kim Il Sung as premier.
  - October. The Yeosu–Suncheon rebellion occurs. While being shipped off to Jeju to suppress the unrest, left-leaning soldiers launch a rebellion in South Jeolla Province. Thousands are killed.
  - 20 November. The South Korean National Assembly passes the National Security Law. The law has been consistently criticized for its broad scope and historical use by South Korean dictatorships to quash political resistance.
- 1949: 26 June. Kim Ku is murdered in his home by Ahn Doo-hee. The exact motives behind the murder still remain unclear.
- 1950 (before Korean War)
  - 30 January. After months of negotiations, Stalin finally relents to Kim's requests to launch an invasion of the South, but makes it conditional on whether Kim can convince Mao to support the effort.
  - April. Mao agrees to support Kim in the invasion.

== Korean War ==
Animated map of the Korean War

- 1950
  - 25 June. The Korean War begins with a surprise attack from the North. While minor border skirmishes had happened prior to the war, they are not comparable in scale of the invasion the North launches. The First Battle of Seoul begins with the deaths of hundreds of civilians; Seoul falls within a few days.
  - 7 July. The UN Security Council creates the United Nations Command under the United States to support the South. Over the following years, tens of thousands of soldiers from a number of countries fight for the South.
  - 26 to 29 July. The No Gun Ri massacre occurs. Unarmed South Korean civilians near the village of Nogeun-ri are deliberately killed by the US Army; the death toll and cause of the massacre is disputed.
  - August. UN forces are driven back to the south-east corner of the Korean Peninsula ("The Pusan Perimeter").
  - September. The Battle of Inchon occurs after UN Troops make a surprise amphibious landing on the west coast. Despite the death toll, the UN resolution's original goal of returning to the status quo borders, and the concerns of the US's allies that China or the USSR could enter the war, MacArthur and Rhee decide to push North and reunify the peninsula. The UN approves this on 7 October, and troops move North on 9 October. This prompts the Chinese to begin planning a counteroffensive.
  - 19 October. Chinese forces as the People's Volunteer Army under Peng Dehuai secretly enter the North.
  - 27 November. Chinese forces launch a massive offensive from the North, which puts the UN and ROK forces into a full retreat.
  - 6 December. The Chinese retake Pyongyang.
  - December. The National Defense Corps incident begins and lasts until February 1951. The Rhee government drafts hundreds of thousands of civilians into a militia, but fail to provide them adequate supplies. Tens of thousands die or disappear.
- 1951
  - 4 January. The North and China take Seoul.
  - 31 January the UNSC votes unanimously to cease interest in the conflict, per UNSC Resolution 90.
  - 15 March. Seoul is retaken by the ROK and UN Forces.
  - July. Armistice talks begin. While the establishment of a demilitarized zone and the creation of an armistice commission are agreed on, the talks stall on the issue of prisoner exchanges. Over the following two years of more stalled talks, the US and UN Forces drop more bombs on North Korea than the Allies did on Germany and Japan in World War II. Both the North and the South commit atrocities against their own citizens and civilians on the other side. Over a million and up to two million Koreans die.
- 1953
  - January. The South Korean newsreel Korean News is established. It serves as an arm of the South Korean government until it closes in 1994.
  - 27 July. The Korean War is halted by the Korean Armistice Agreement that has remained in force until now.

== Modern period ==
- 1955: May. Chongryon, an association for Koreans in Japan that are aligned with North Korea, is created.
- 1956
  - April. Chongryon assists in establishing the North Korean-aligned Korea University in Tokyo.
  - September. The August Faction Incident occurs, in which pro-Soviet and pro-Chinese North Koreans attempt to purge Kim Il Sung. Kim then conducts a counter-purge.
- 1960: A student uprising begins the April Revolution which overthrows the First Republic of South Korea. Syngman Rhee resigns and goes into exile.
- 1961
  - 16 May. The May 16 coup occurs, in which General Park Chung Hee overthrows the Second Republic of Korea.
  - 12 November. Summit conference for normalization of Korean-Japanese relations.
- 1962
  - January. Start of the first Five-Year Plan of South Korea.
  - 12 October. The Sino-Korean Border Agreement is signed, beginning the process of establishing the modern border between China and North Korea. The process finishes with the agreement's 1964 companion, the Protocols on the Sino–Korean Border.
- 1964: South Korea joins the Vietnam War.
- 1965: 22 June. The signing of Treaty on Basic Relations between Japan and the Republic of Korea. Earned both much controversy and procurement of budgets for later economic developments.
- 1967: Start of the second five-year plan.
- 1968
  - January. The Blue House raid, an unsuccessful attempt of North Korean commandos to assassinate South Korean president Park Chung Hee occurs.
  - April. In retaliation for the Blue House raid, a South Korean group is created (Unit 684) to assassinate Kim Il Sung, but the group eventually mutinies on 23 August.
- 1970
  - 22 April. Start of the Saemaul Undong.
  - Gyeongbu Expressway is completed and opened to traffic.
- 1972
  - Start of the third five-year plan.
- 1972
  - 12 August. The first Red Cross talks between North and South Korea are held.
- 1972
  - President Park Chung Hee declares emergency martial law and changes the constitution in August, which allows for him to become the permanent ruler.
- 1974: 15 August. The assassination of first lady Yuk Young-soo by North Korean sympathizer Mun Se-gwang.
- 1976
  - The Koreagate scandal breaks out in the United States.
  - 18 August. The Axe Murder Incident in Panmunjom, Joint Security Area. Triggers former North Korean leader Kim Il Sung's first official apology to the South.
- 1977: Start of the fourth five-year plan
- 1979: 26 October. The assassination of Park Chung Hee.
- 1979: The Coup d'état of December Twelfth sees Chun Doo-hwan seize power.
- 1980: Gwangju Uprising. Martial law is declared throughout the nation. The city of Gwangju becomes a battleground between dissenters and the Armed Forces (18–27 May). The official death toll was set at 200 people but some reports claim over 1000 casualties.
- 1985: A South Korean expedition team becomes the first Koreans to set foot in Antarctica.
- 1987: The June Democratic Struggle begins, which eventually overthrows the autocratic Fifth Republic of South Korea. The ruling party of Fifth Republic, Democratic Justice Party, then declares democratic elections.
- 1988
  - 17 February. The King Sejong Station becomes the first South Korean research station in Antarctica.
  - 17 September – 2 October. The 24th Olympic Games are held in Seoul. This event has since become viewed as a watershed moment that showcased South Korea's rapid economic development to the world.
- 1990: 11 September. South Korea and the USSR establish diplomatic relations.
- 1991
  - 17 September. North Korea (DPRK) and South Korea (ROK) join the United Nations (UN).
  - 26 December. The end of the Cold War as the Soviet Union collapses and North Korea loses military and economic aid.
- 1992
  - 11 August. South Korea's first satellite, KITSAT-1, a.k.a. 우리별 (Uri Byol) is successfully launched from Guiana Space Centre.
  - 24 August. South Korea and the People's Republic of China (PRC) establish diplomatic relations.
- 1993: Test of Rodong-1, a single-stage, mobile liquid propellant medium-range ballistic missile by the North Korea.
- 1994
  - 8 October. Kim Jong Il becomes leader of North Korea upon the death of his father.
  - 21 October. The Seongsu Bridge disaster occurs in Seoul.
  - Start of the North Korean famine, which ends in 1998.
- 1995: 29 June. The Sampoong Department Store collapses in Seoul.
- 1996: The Central Government Building, formerly known as the Government-General of Chōsen Building, begins to be demolished.
- 1997: The Asian Financial Crisis (or "IMF Crisis", as it was called in Korea) affects Korea
- 1998
  - Taepodong-1, a two-stage intermediate-range ballistic missile is developed and tested by the DPRK.
  - The Shimonoseki Trial, the first ever lawsuit against the Japanese government by comfort women or forced laborers by Koreans, ends with the denial of compensation for the three women.
- 1999: The DPRK promises to freeze long-range missile tests.
- 2002
  - 14 January – 19 March. TV series Winter Sonata achieves significant international viewership in the Philippines and Japan, bolstering the growing Korean Wave.
  - The 2002 FIFA World Cup jointly held by Korea & Japan. South Korea national football team reaches the semi-finals for the first time in Korean football history.
- 2004
  - The DPRK reaffirms moratorium.
- 2007: The second summit between DPRK and ROK leaders is held, with Roh Moo-hyun representing the south and Kim Jong Il the north. The DPRK fires short-range missile into the Sea of Japan.
- 2008: 8 April. A Korean woman, Yi So-yeon, becomes the first Korean to fly to outer space.
- 2010: South Korean island Yeonpyeongdo is bombarded by North Korea.
- 2011: Kim Jong Il dies, Kim Jong Un takes over as the Supreme Leader of North Korea. The National Intelligence Service accuses pro-unification lawmakers of being spies. One of the members was a former Democratic Party representative. In a move indicative of the heavy-handedness of the Park regime, the party is outlawed and key party members are imprisoned.
- 2012: 19 December. Park Geun-hye, a daughter of Park Chung Hee, is elected as first female and the 11th president of South Korea.
- 2013: 12 December. North Korean Supreme Leader Kim Jong Un, executes his uncle and major North Korean politician, Jang Song-thaek.
- 2014: 16 April. Sinking of MV Sewol, where 304 people, mostly students, die.
- 2016: 9 December. President Park Geun-hye is impeached.
- 2017
  - 10 March. The court upheld the impeachment in a unanimous 8–0 decision, removing Park from office.
  - 10 May. Moon Jae-In is sworn into office immediately after official votes were counted on 10 May, replacing Acting President and Prime Minister Hwang Kyo-Ahn.
- 2019: 21 May. The South Korean film Parasite premieres at the 2019 Cannes Film Festival, and becomes the first Korean film to win the top prize. At the 2020 Academy Awards, it becomes the first Korean film to receive any recognition from the academy, and the first non–English language film to win Best Picture.
- 2021: 17 September. Premiere of the TV series Squid Game, which becomes an international sensation with hundreds of millions of viewers around the world.
- 2022
  - 10 May. Yoon Suk Yeol is sworn into office, succeeding former President Moon Jae-in.
  - 5 July. American mathematician of Korean descent June Huh is awarded the Fields Medal, which is considered the most prestigious award in mathematics. He is the first ethnic Korean to receive the award.
  - 29 October. Seoul Halloween crowd crush, 159 people are killed and another 197 injured in the deadliest accident since the sinking of the Sewol.
- 2024:
  - 3 December. In the evening, President Yoon Suk Yeol declares martial law, but it is overturned by 04:30 the following morning. A political crisis begins.
  - 10 December. South Korean writer Han Kang becomes the first ethnic Korean and first Asian woman to receive the Nobel Prize in Literature.
  - 14 December. President Yoon is impeached, although confirmation of this pended approval by the Constitutional Court of Korea.
  - 27 December. Acting president Han Duck-soo is impeached, making deputy prime minister and finance minister Choi Sang-mok the acting president.
- 2025:
  - 15 January. Yoon Suk Yeol is arrested after multiple previous failed attempts and an hours-long standoff at his residence. He is South Korea's first sitting president to be arrested.
  - 18 January. Yoon supporters storm the Seoul Western District Court in an attempt to block his legal proceedings. The attempt fails and order is restored.
  - 24 March. Han Duck-soo's impeachment is overturned by the Constitutional Court, making him acting president again.
  - 4 April. Yoon's impeachment is confirmed by the Constitutional Court.
  - 4 June. Lee Jae Myung is sworn into office, succeeding former President Yoon Suk Yeol.

== Gallery ==
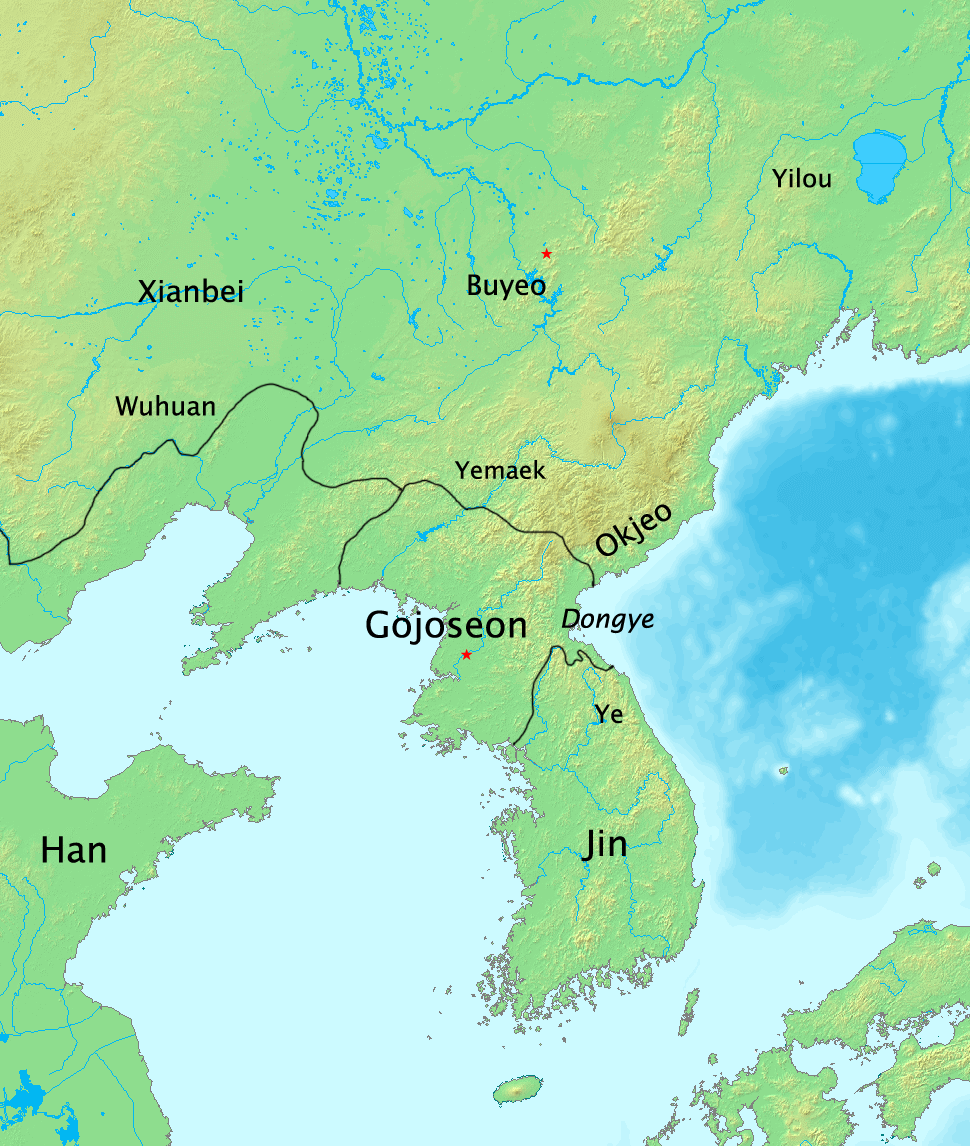
Korea 108 BC

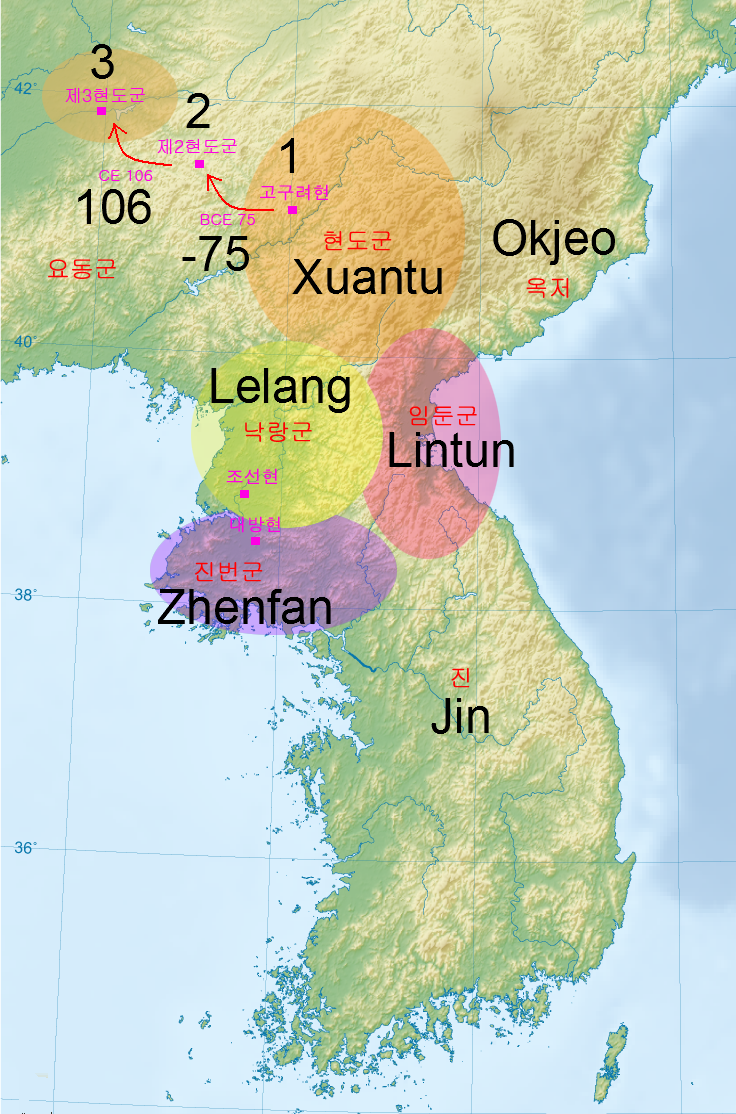
The Four Commanderies of Han, 107 BC

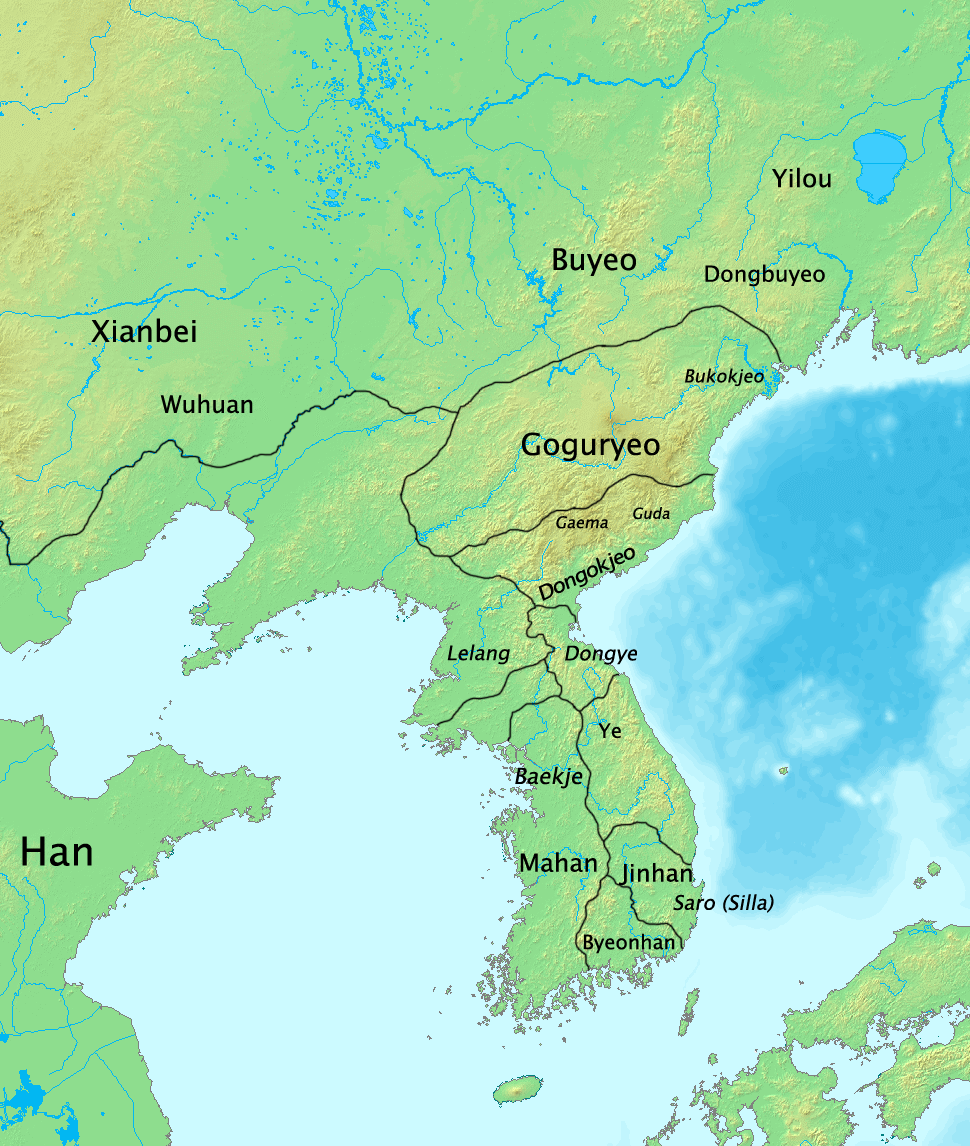
Korea in 1 AD

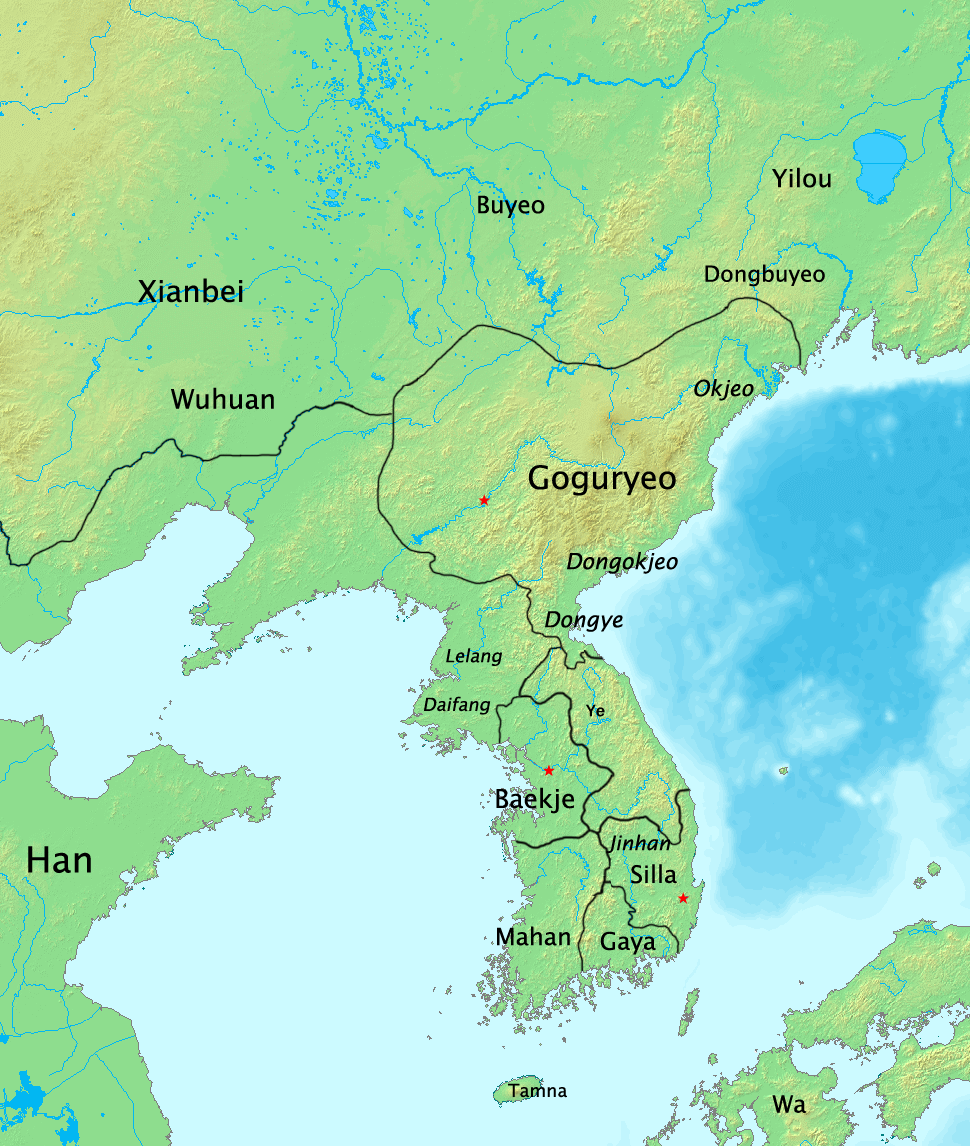
Korea 204 AD

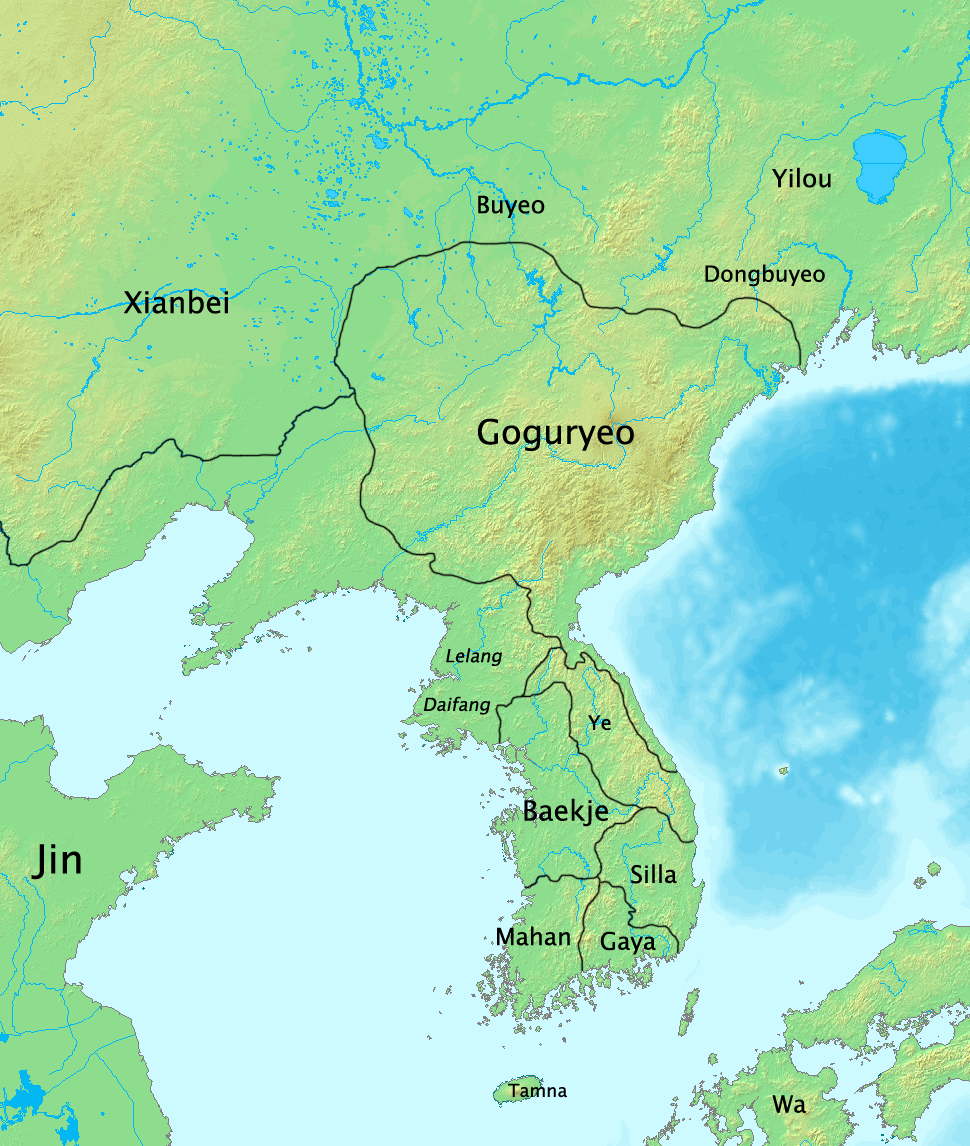
Korea in 300 AD

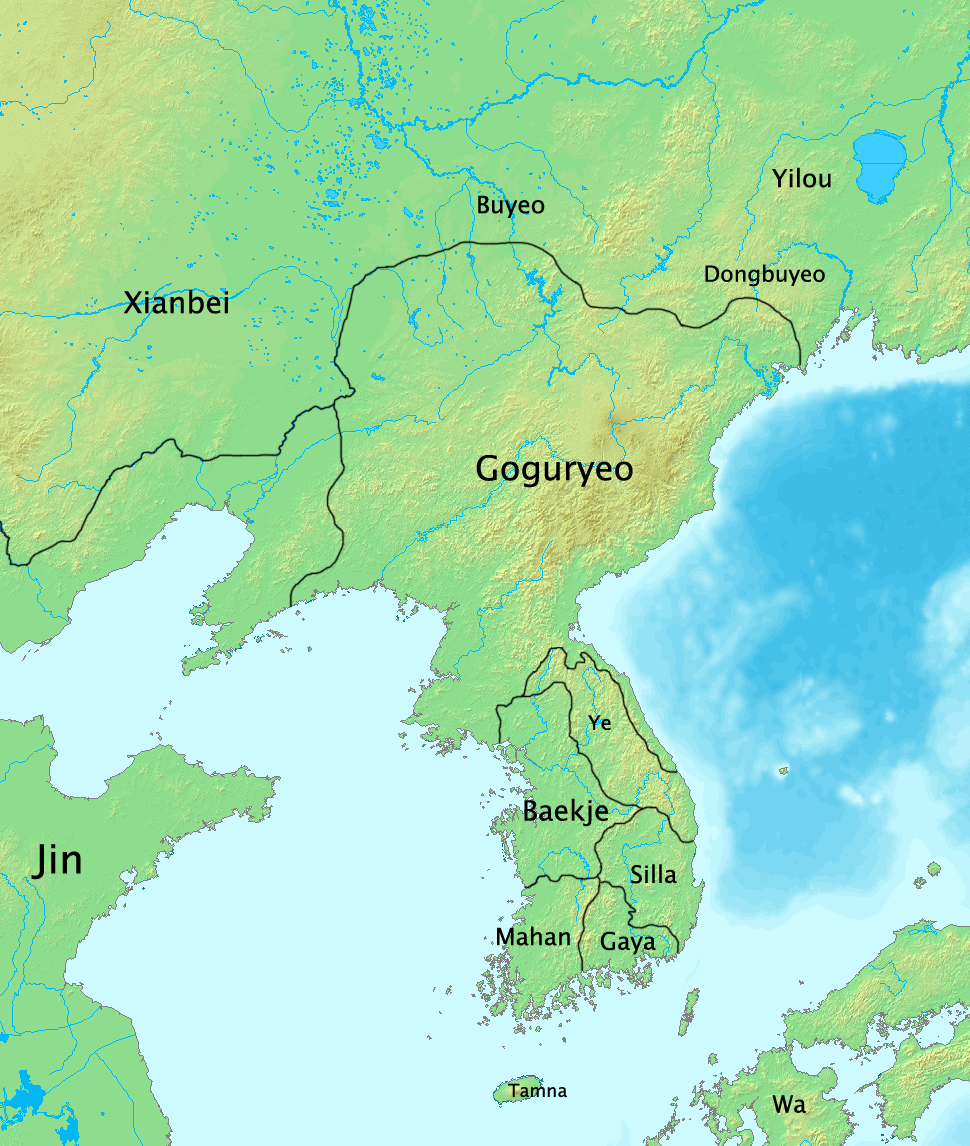
Korea in 315 AD

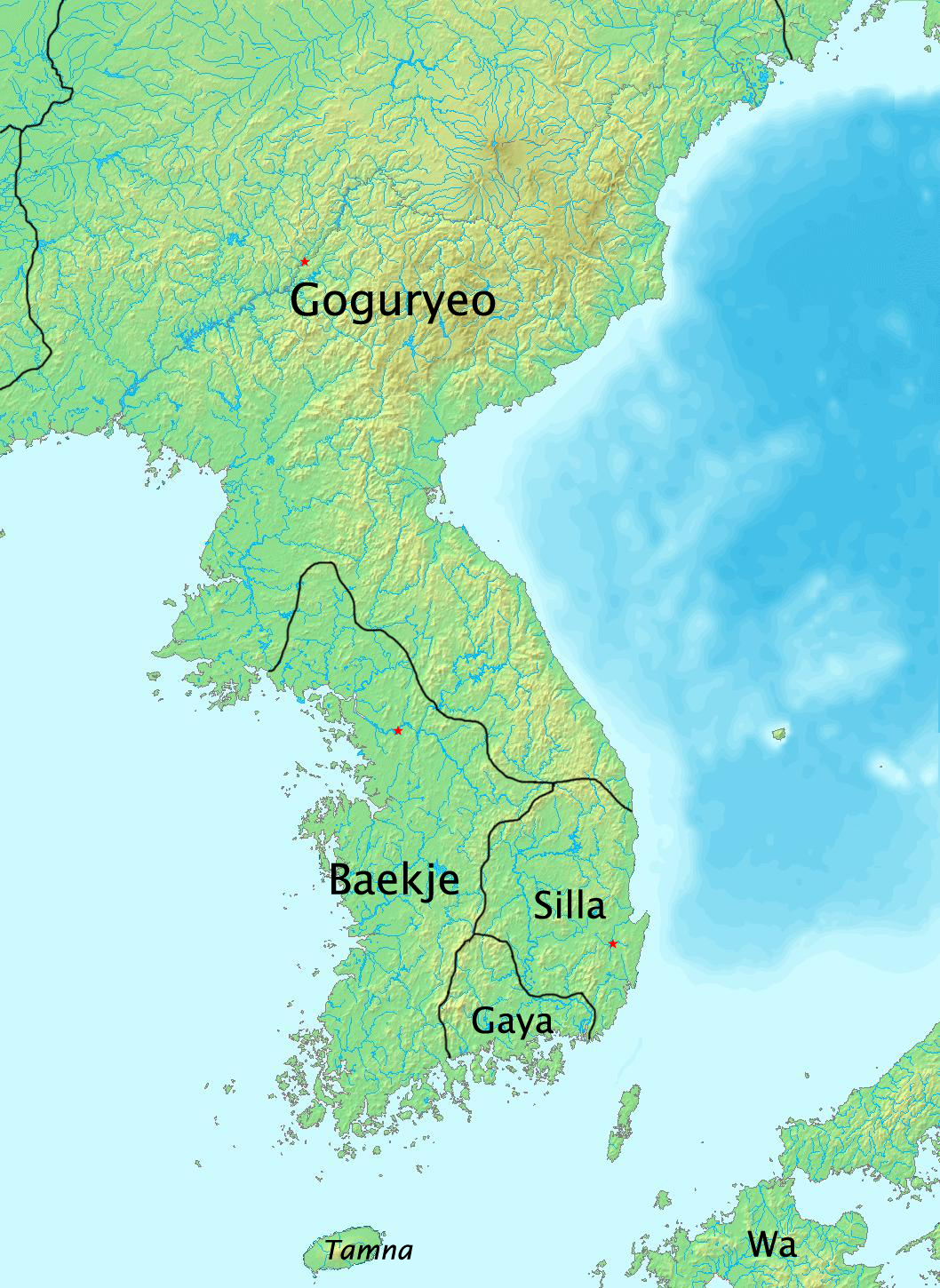
Korea in 375 AD

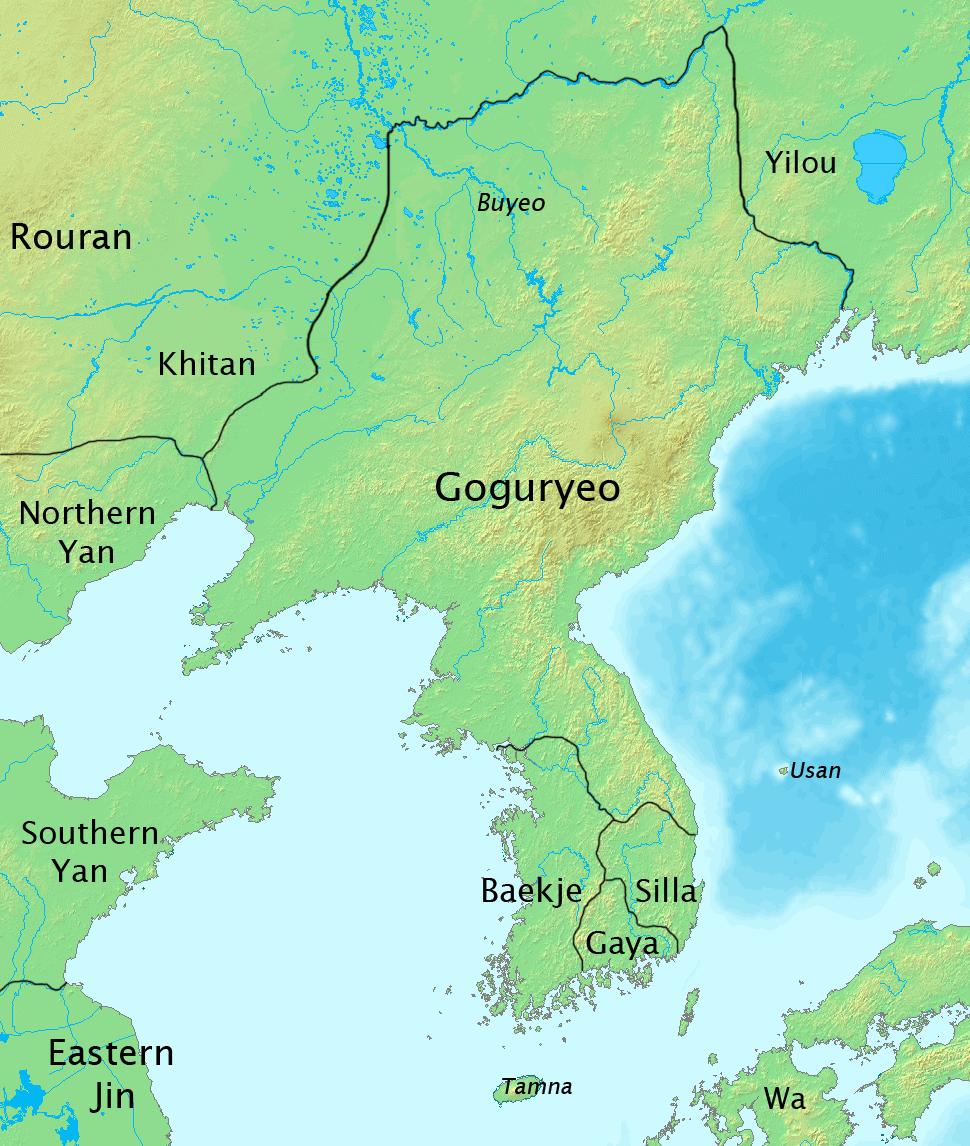
Korea in 410 AD

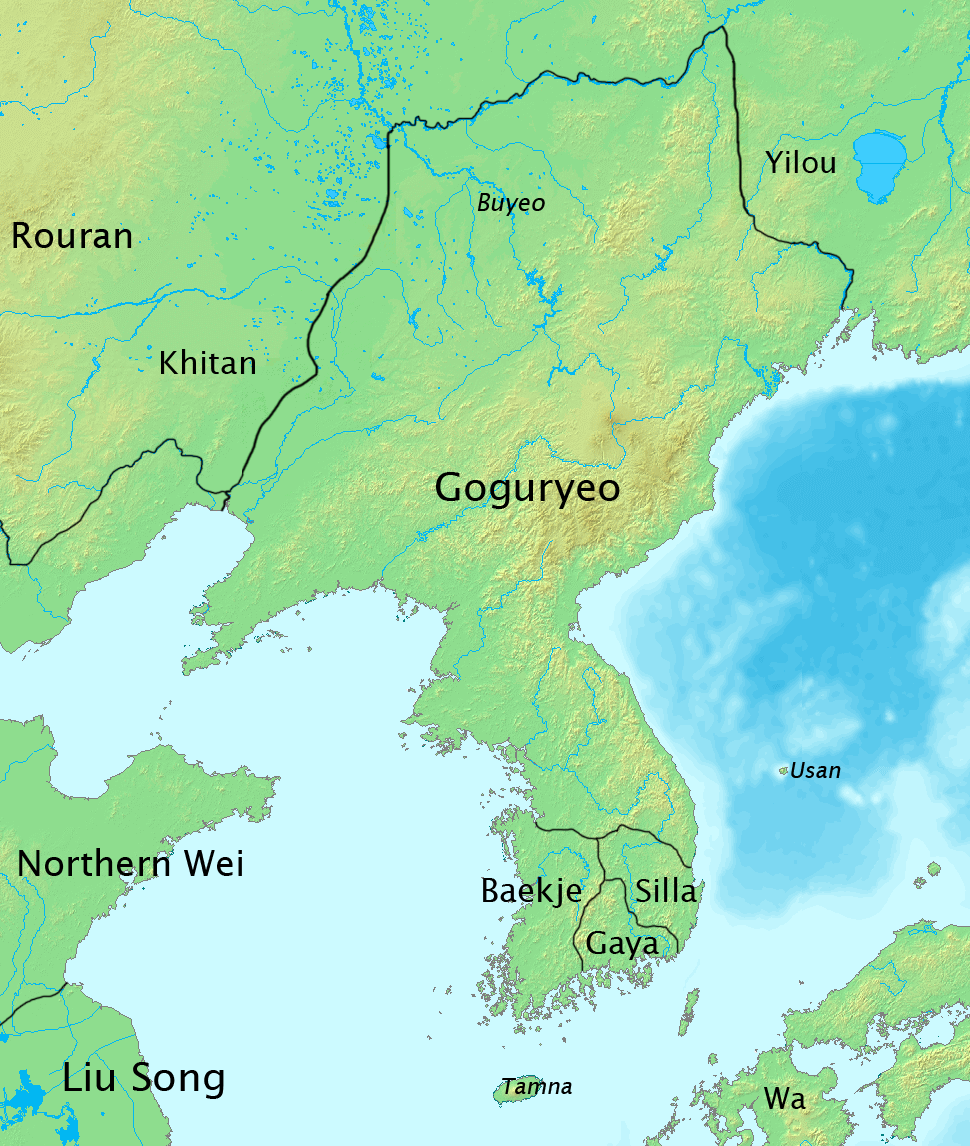
Korea in 476 AD

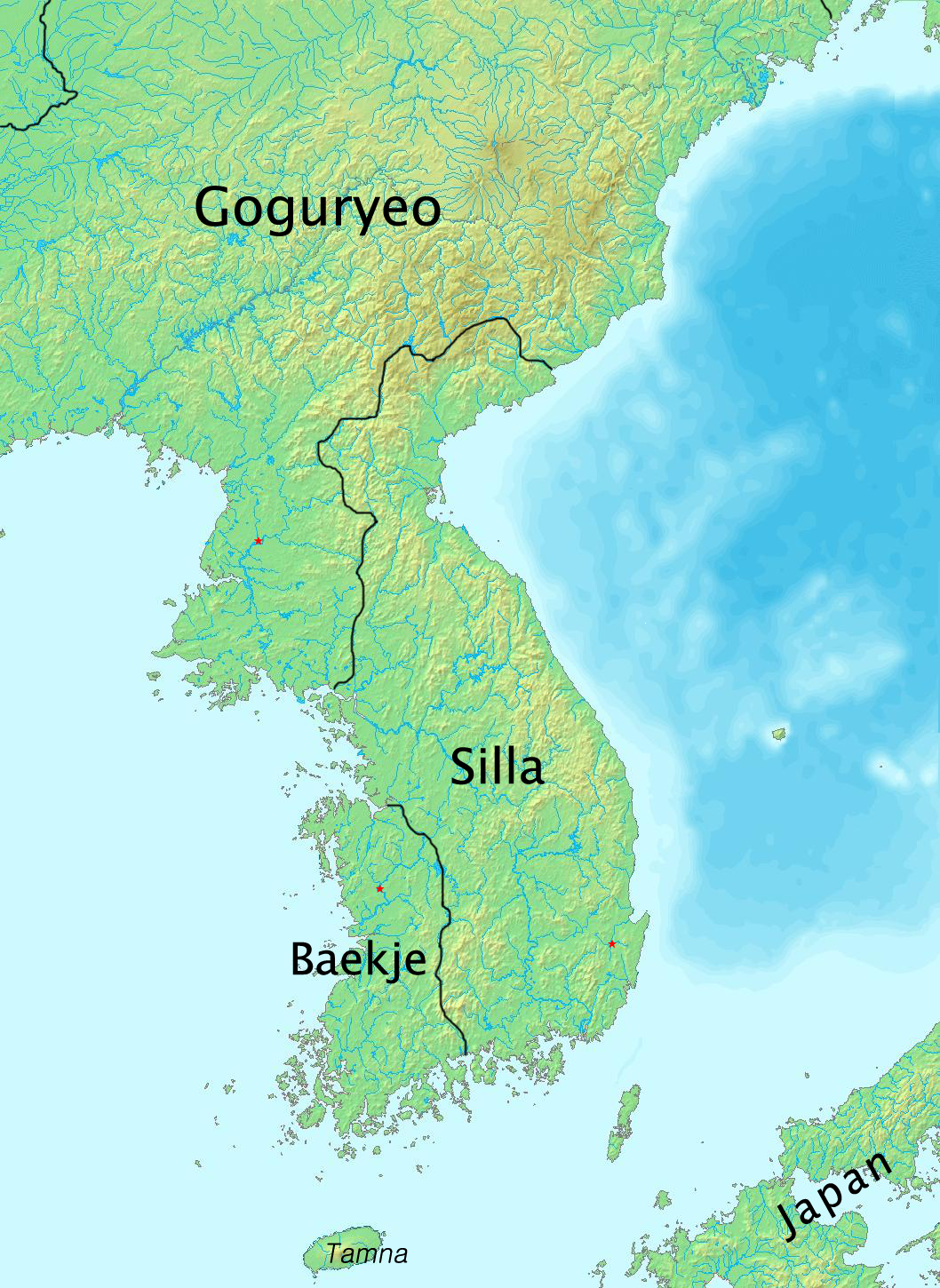
Korea in 576 AD

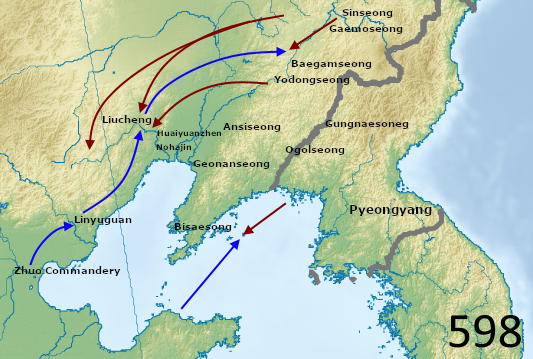
Goguryeo–Sui War in 598 AD

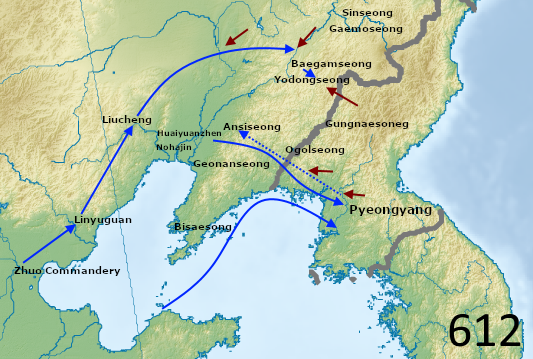
Goguryeo–Sui War in 612 AD

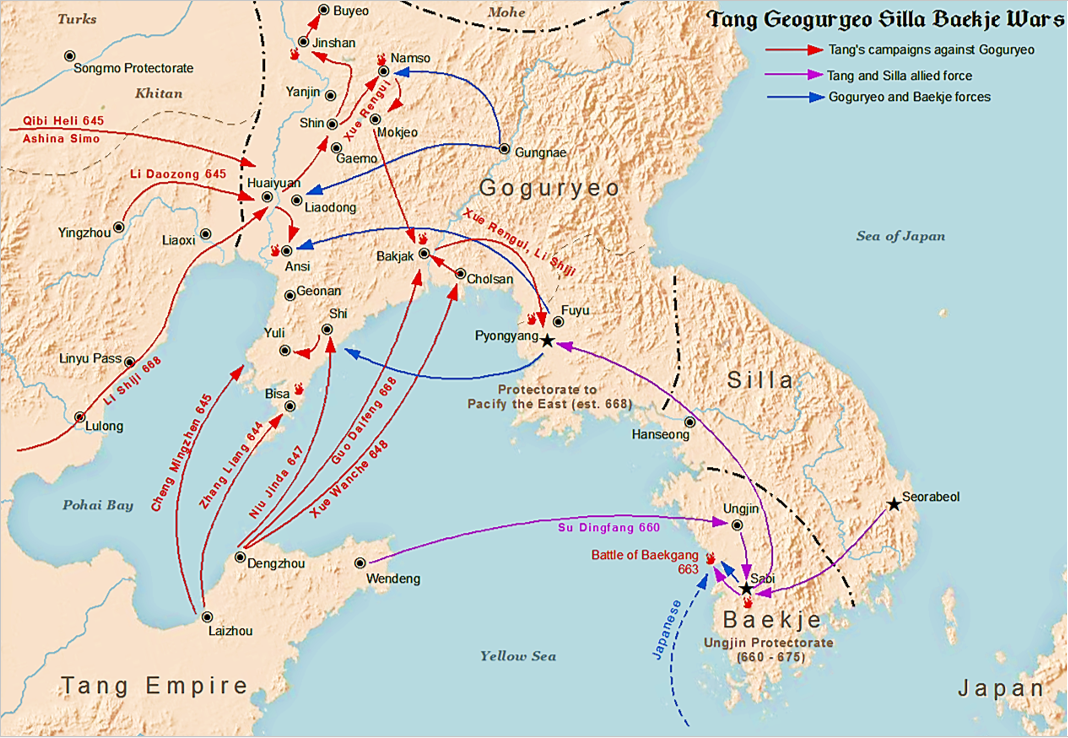
Goguryeo–Tang War (645–668)

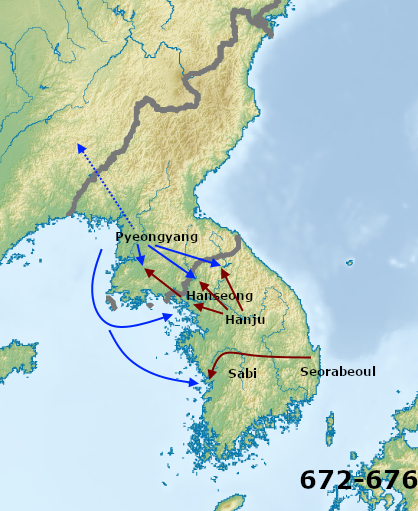
Silla–Tang War (672–676)

Little Goguryeo (699–820)

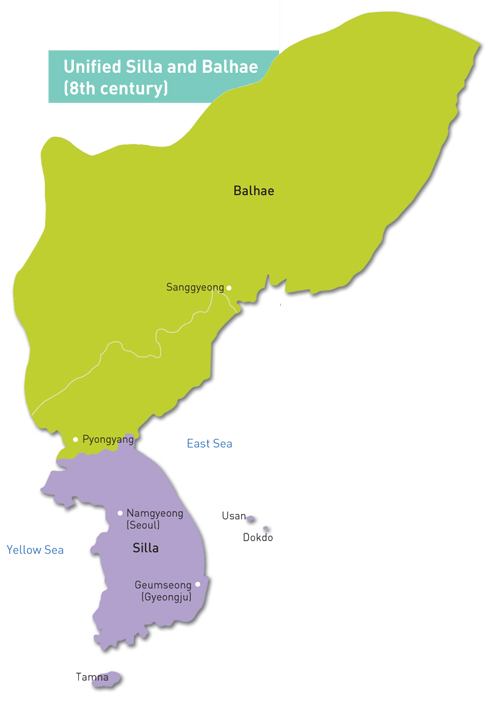
Unified Silla and Balhae in the 8th century AD

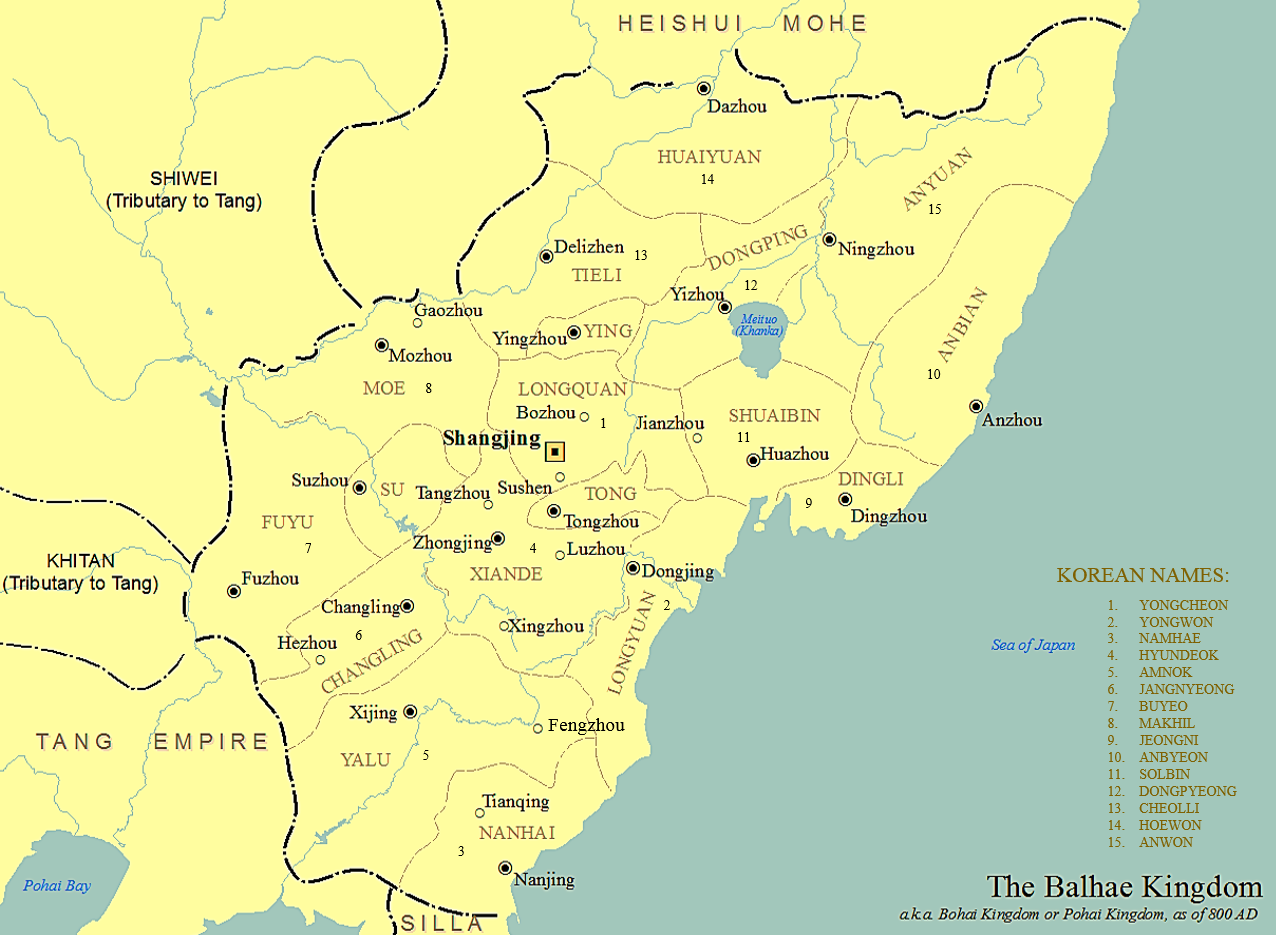
Balhae in 800 AD

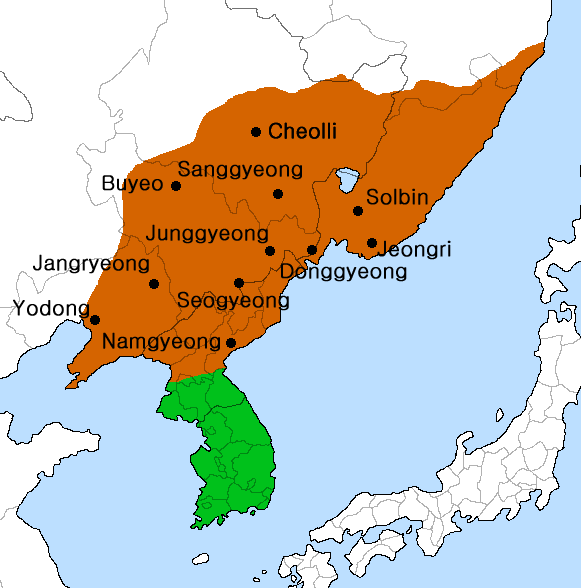
Balhae in 830 AD

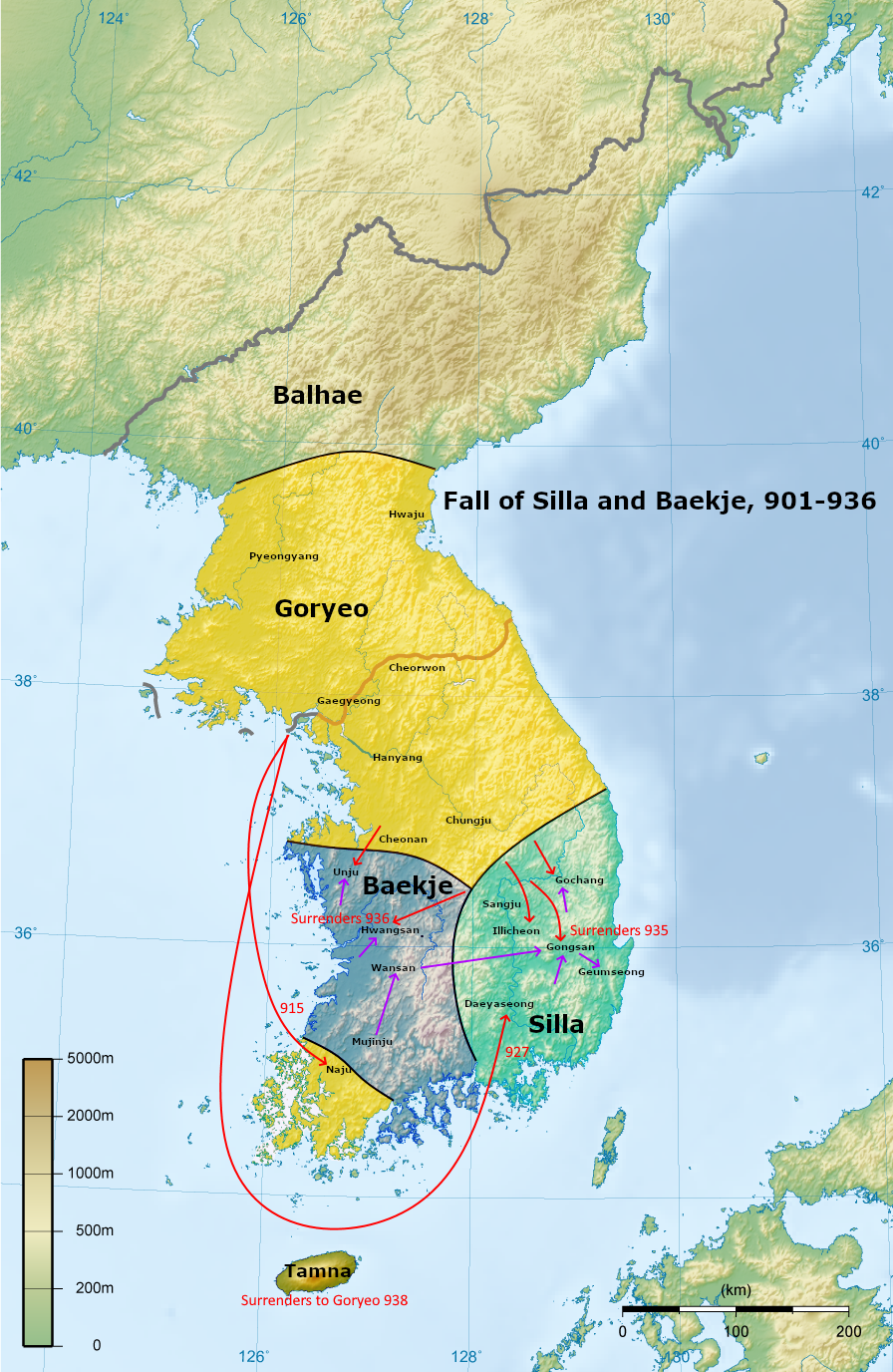
Fall of Silla and Baekje, 901-936 AD

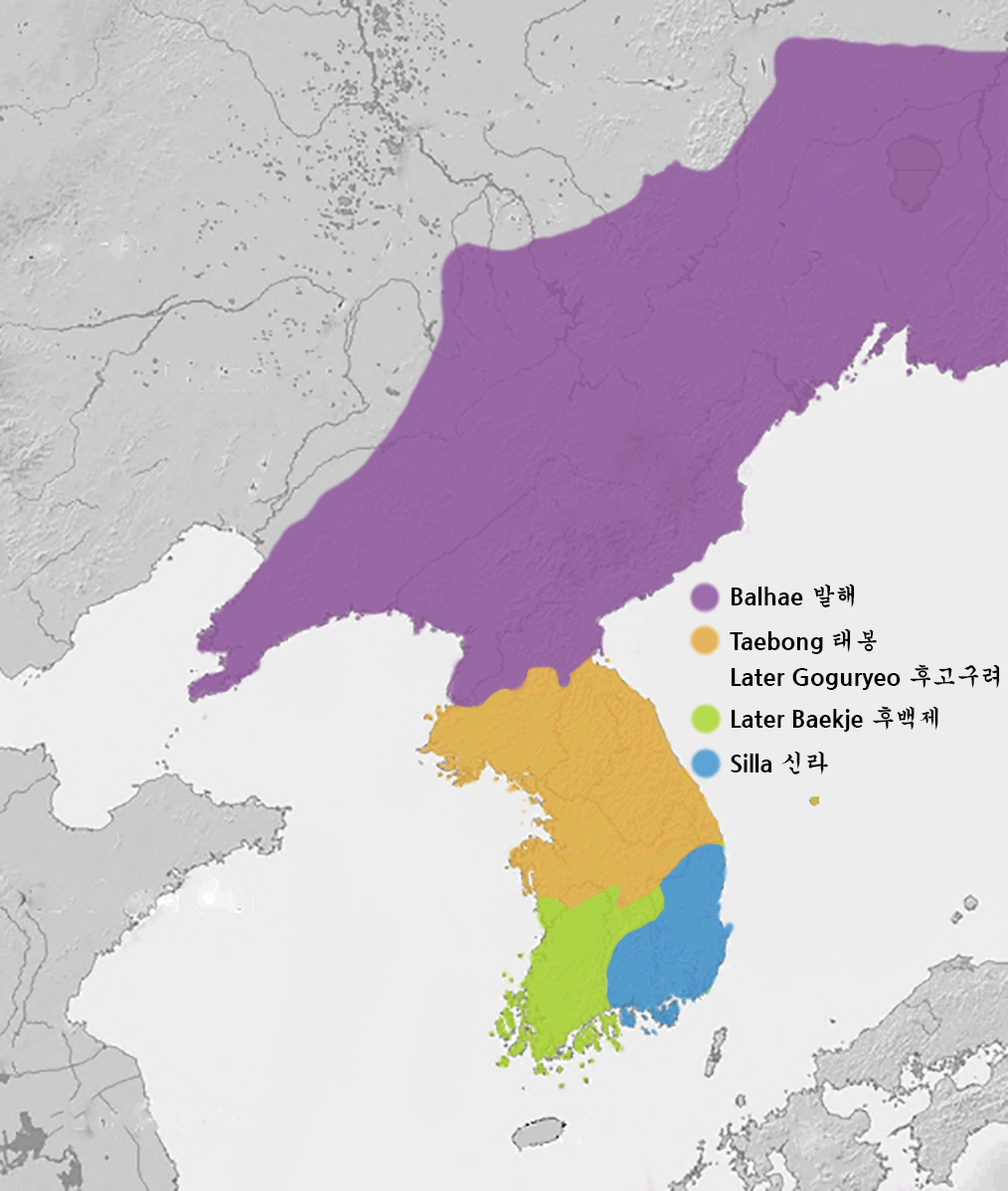
Korea in 915 AD

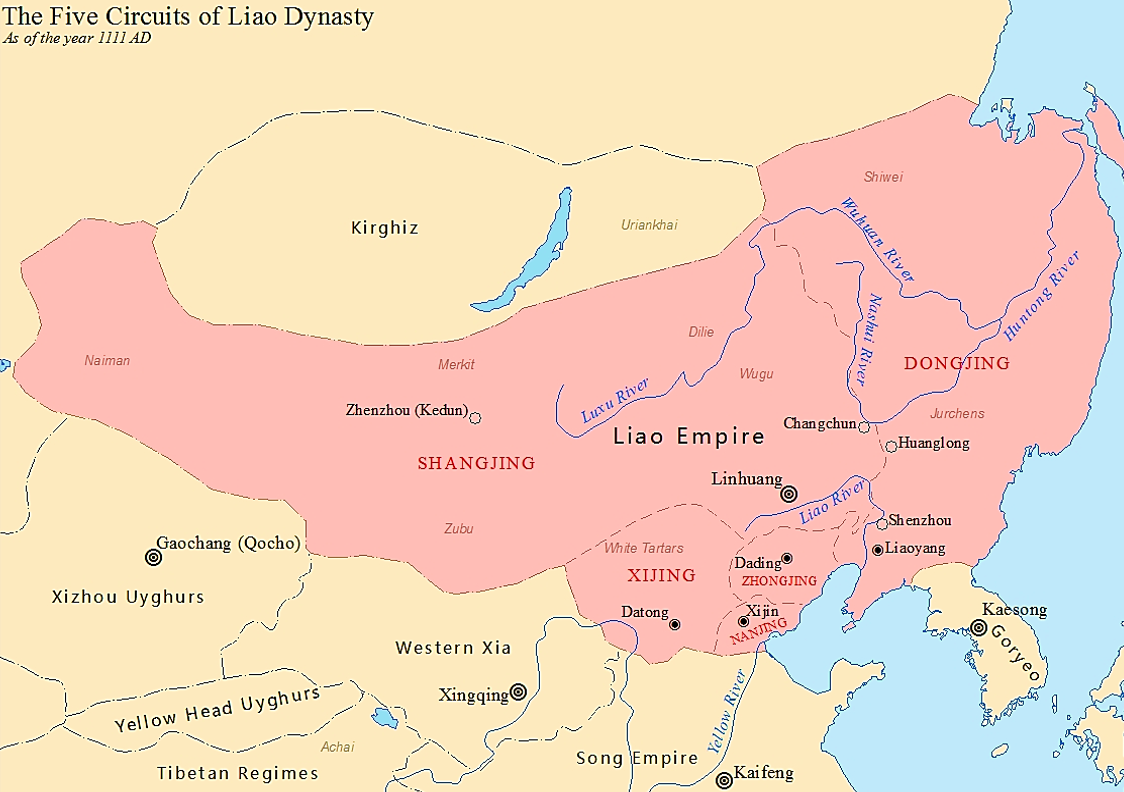
Liao dynasty (907–1125)

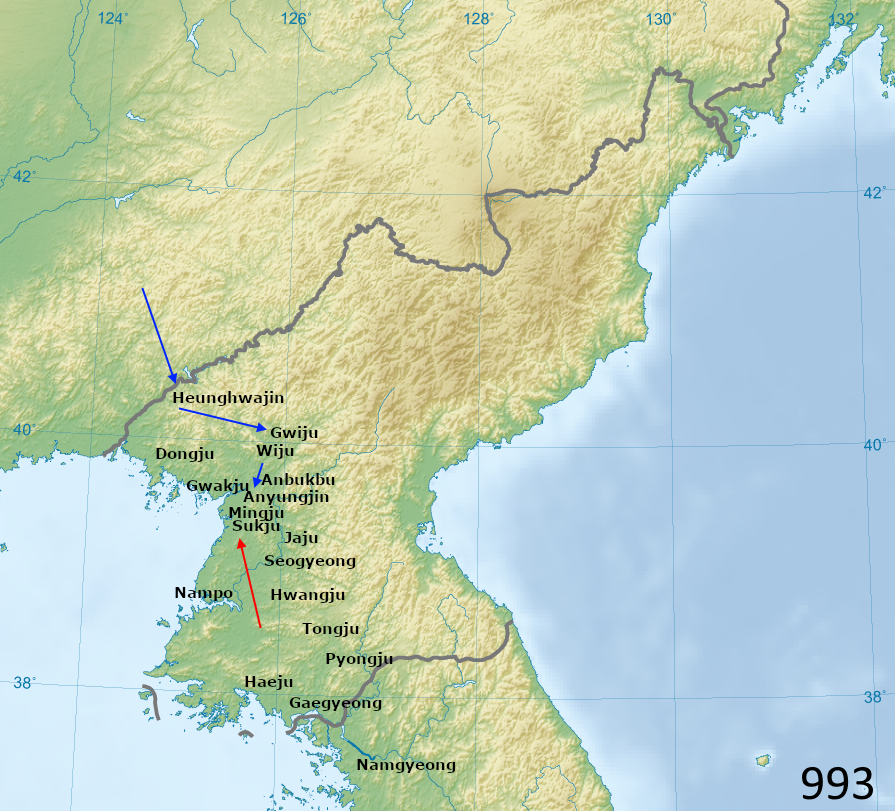
First conflict in the Goryeo–Khitan War (993 AD)

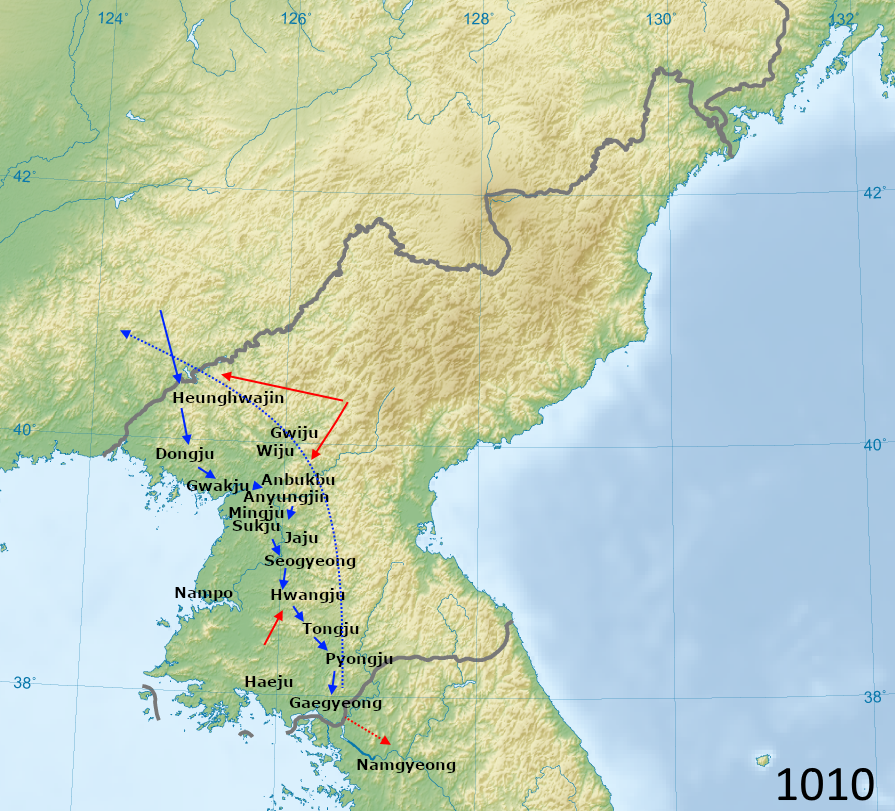
Second conflict in the Goryeo–Khitan War (1010 AD)

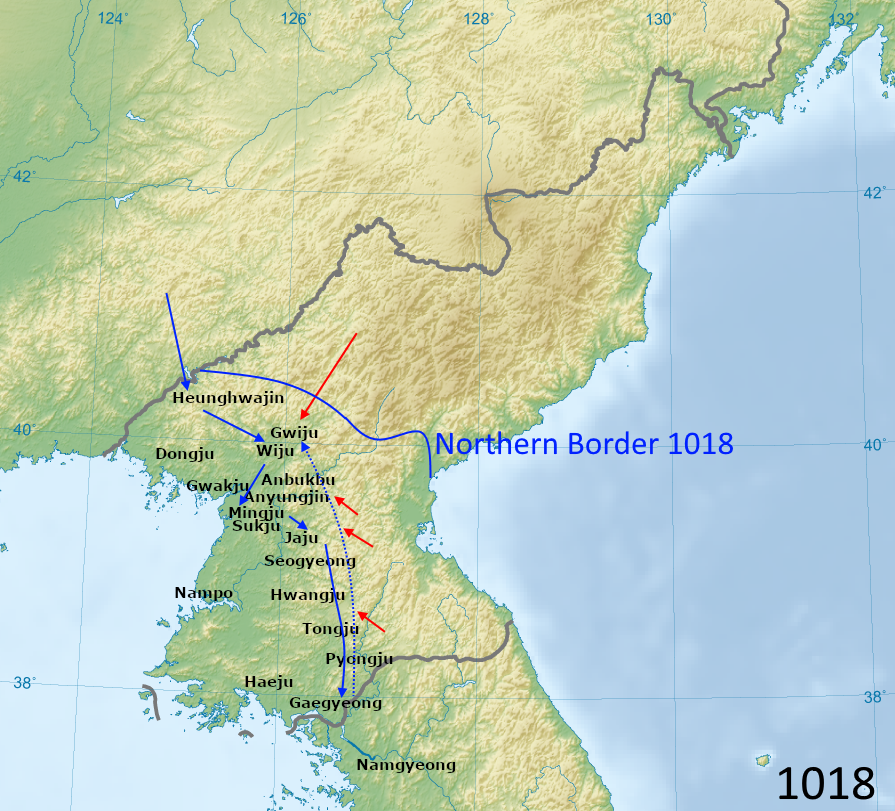
Third conflict in the Goryeo–Khitan War (1018 AD)

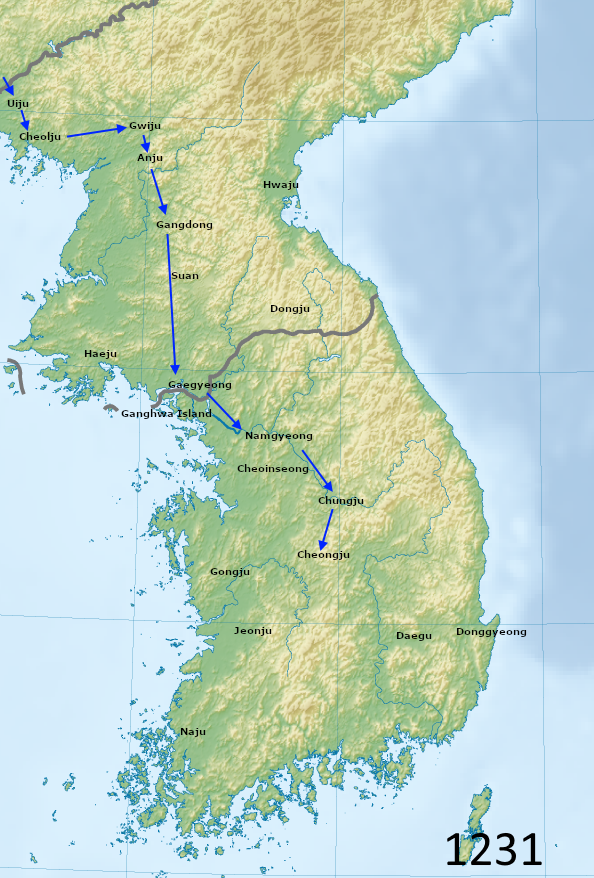
1231 Mongol invasion of Goryeo

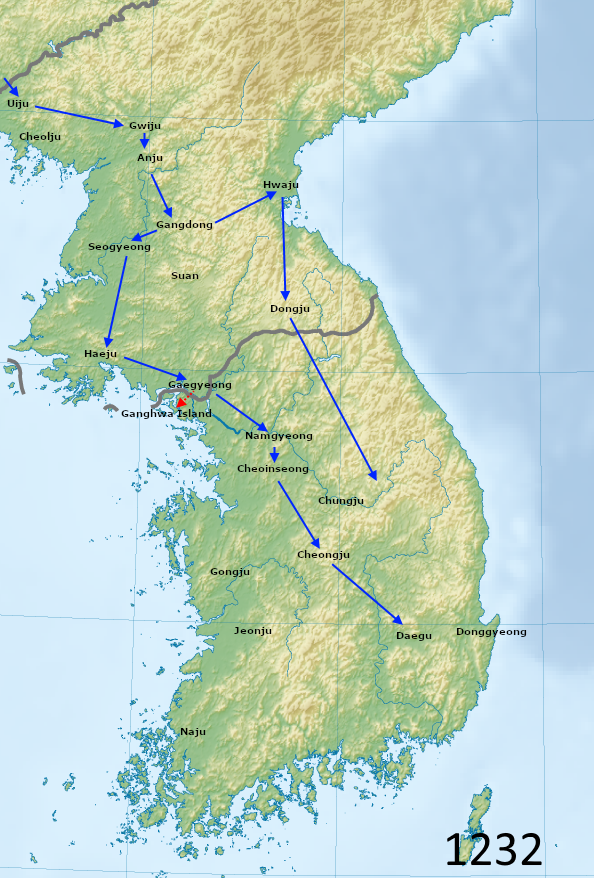
1232 Mongol invasion of Goryeo

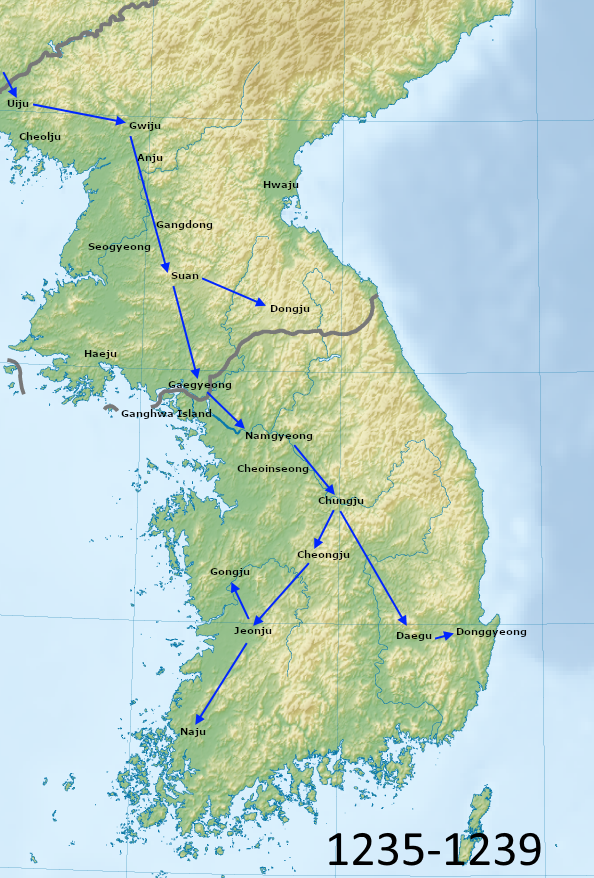
1235 Mongol invasion of Goryeo

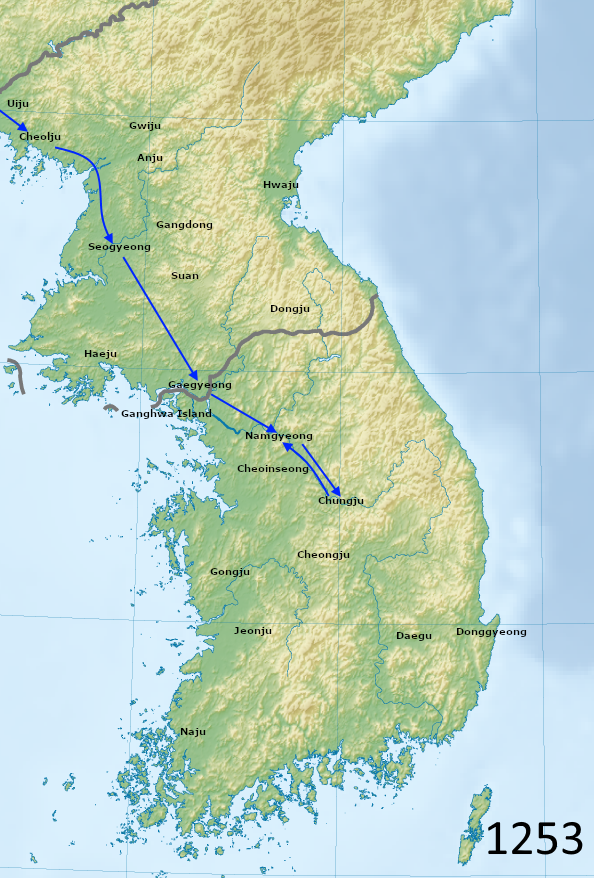
1253 Mongol invasion of Goryeo

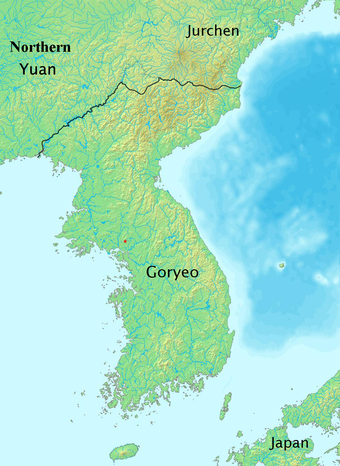
Goryeo in 1374

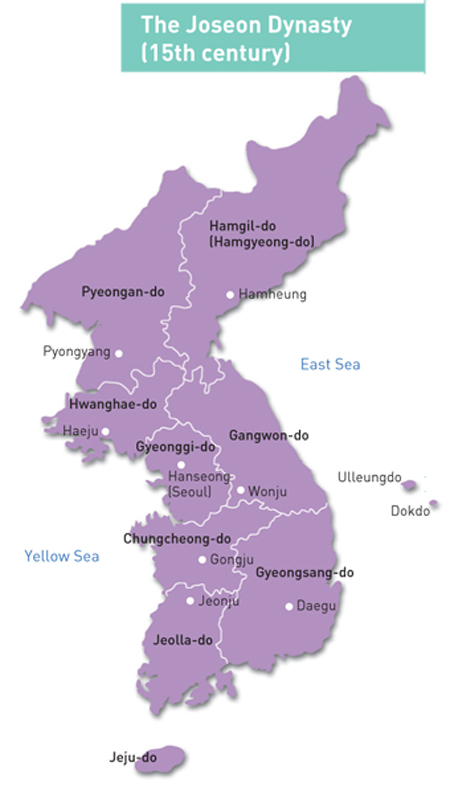
Joseon (15th century)

The Eight Provinces of Korea

Japanese invasions of Korea (1592–98)

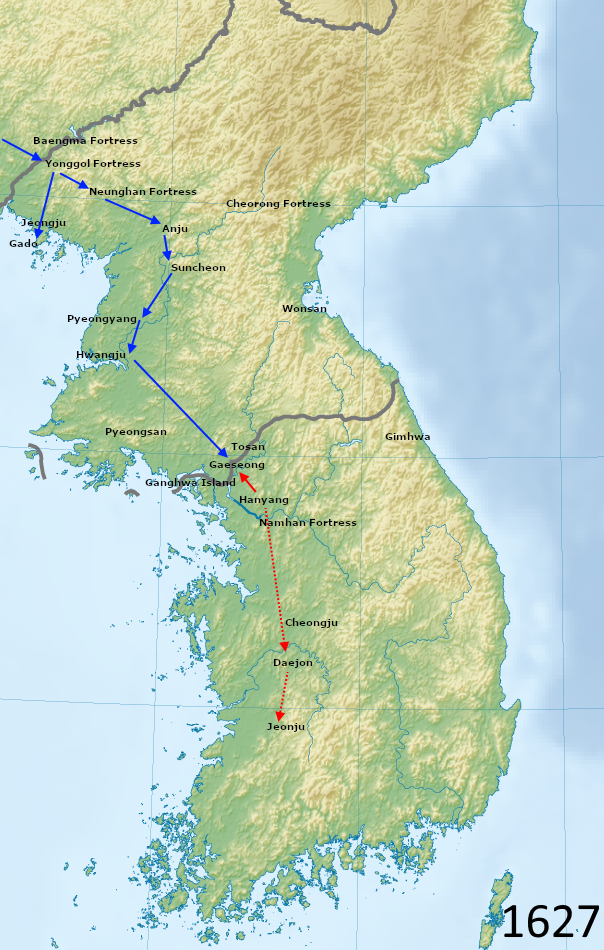
Later Jin invasion of Joseon in 1627

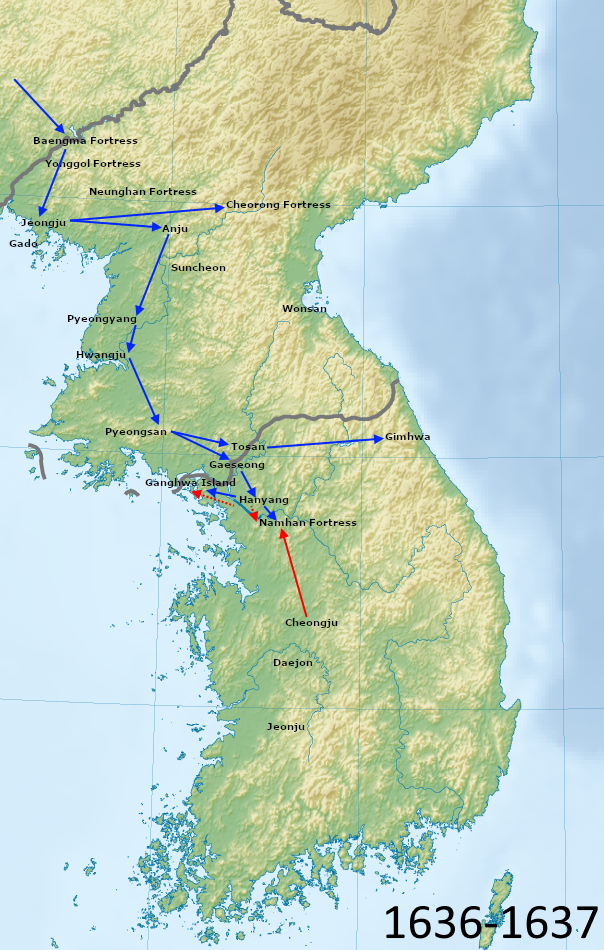
Qing invasion of Joseon (1636–1637)

First Sino-Japanese War (25 July 1894 – 17 April 1895)

Empire of Japan (1868–1947)

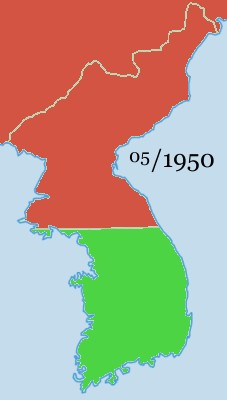
Korean War May 1950

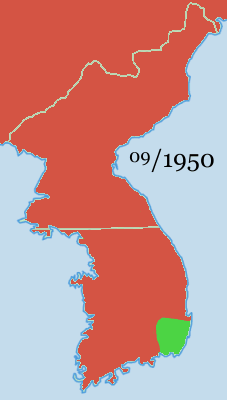
Korean War September 1950

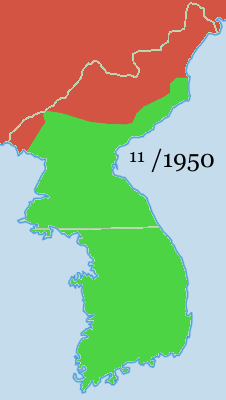
Korean War November 1950

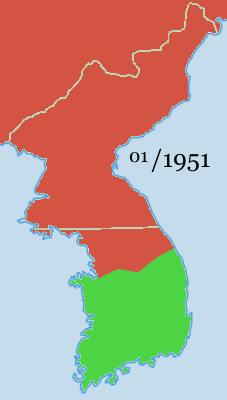
Korean War January 1951

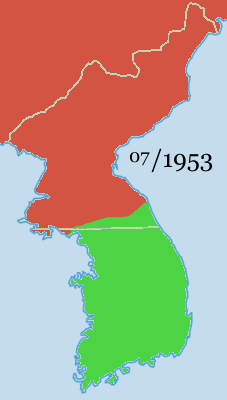
Korean War July 1953

== See also ==
- Korean monarchs' family trees: Silla; Goryeo; Joseon
- List of Korean monarchs
- History of Korea
- Military history of Korea
- Timeline of Seoul history
