= 1998 Shimonoseki Trial =

Legal trial on comfort women issue

Shimonoseki Trial, 1992–98
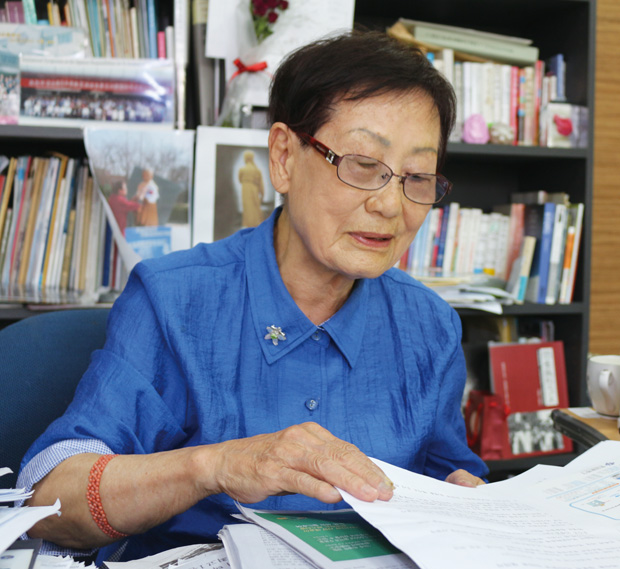
- Chairwoman Moon-sook Kim
- Venue: Shimonoseki Branch of the Yamaguchi Prefectural Court
- Location: Shimonoseki, Japan
- Also known as: Busan Military Comfort Women and Women's Volunteer Labor Corps Official Apology Lawsuit (釜山従軍慰安婦・女子勤労挺身隊公式謝罪等請求訴訟))
- Participants: Presiding Justice: Hideaki Konoshita
- Outcome: Plaintiff favored; Defendant to pay 3 of 10 Plaintiffs 300,000 yen and 5% interest on the judgement from September 1, 1992 until payment is complete; all other demands from Plaintiffs dismissed; Litigation expenses for Plaintiffs to pay 1/3 of costs, Defendant to pay the remainder in addition to their own legal fees.
- Verdict: Majority Unanimous
- Laws applied: Japanese Constitution Preamble, Article 9, Article 13; Civil Law-Suit Act Article 61, Article 64, Article 65; State Liability Act Article 1-1, Article 4; State Indemnification Act; Civil Law Act Article 723

The Shimonoseki Trial (關釜裁判, 釜山従軍慰安婦・女子勤労挺身隊公式謝罪等請求訴訟; Korean: 관부재판) was a legal trial between three Korean comfort women victims and seven forced laborers, part of the Korean Women's Volunteer Labor Corps from the City of Busan and the Japanese Government from 1992 to 1998. The trial marked the first-ever lawsuit against the Japanese government by Korean victims of the comfort women and forced labor systems within the Japanese legal system and resulted in the Japanese judicial system admitting that the comfort women system was the fault of the Japanese government. The initial ruling made by the Shimonoseki Branch of the Yamaguchi Prefectural Court on April 27, 1998 marked an end to the nearly six year-long battle in the Prefectural Court that started on December 25, 1992 ruling in favor of the plaintiffs. The final ruling of the case was made by the Supreme Court of Japan on March 25, 2003. It upheld the Appeals Court of Hiroshima's ruling rejecting the ruling of the Prefectural Court and denying financial compensation for the plaintiffs while acknowledging the reality of the comfort women system and its victims.

== Background ==
During the Second World War, approximately 80,000–200,000 Korean comfort women and 50,000–70,000 forced laborers of the Korean Women's Volunteer Labor Corps were coerced and recruited into the Japanese war efforts. After the war, these victims of the Japanese colonial rule were not properly compensated nor publicly discussed. South Korea being a socially conservative country and the issue of sexual violence being a sensitive topic made it difficult for the victims of the comfort women system to speak on their experiences as sex slaves under the Japanese colonial rule.

On August 14, 1991, Kim Hak-sun held a public conference to speak on her experience as a comfort woman as South Korea started to democratize in the 1990s.

Kim Moon-sook, the chairwoman of the Busan Women's Entrepreneur Association, was one of the activists inspired by the wave of activism for comfort women victims. On October 19, 1991, Kim opened a hotline for comfort women victims in the region to call and report their experiences as comfort women during the War. Numerous victims have called the hotline to report their experience as a comfort woman as well as a forced laborer under the Korean Women's Volunteer Labor Corps. On November 14, 1992, the power of attorney was given to Korean-Japanese lawyer Lee Park-Sung, and Japanese lawyer Yamazaki Yoshio. On December 25, 1992, a formal complaint was made against the Japanese government marking the beginning of the Shimonoseki Trial. The plaintiffs sued the Japanese government for a formal apology as well as 286,000,000 Japanese Yen as compensation. The formal complaint was made through the Shimonoseki Branch of the Yamaguchi Prefectural Court since Shimonoseki was the site where most of the victims landed before being shipped off to other locations into the forced labor and the comfort women system.

== Rationale and rulings ==
When this suit was filed, the Plaintiffs, ten former South Korean comfort women, presented five demands:

1. The Defendant officially apologizes in both the Japanese Diet and the General Assembly of the United Nations for the pain and suffering that was imposed on the Plaintiffs and other Korean comfort women, as well as for any suffering inflicted from the Japanese annexation of the Korean Peninsula, Imperial Japan's utilization and forced mobilization of Korean peoples during World War II, and for Japan's lack of post-war reparations
2. The Defendant pays 110 million yen to the Plaintiffs Ha Sun-nyo, Park Tu-ri, and Lee Sun-dok, 33 million yen to Plaintiffs Yu Chan-i, Park So-duk, Park Sun-bok, Lee Yong-son, Kang Yong-jyu, Chong Su-ryon, and Yang Kum-dok, plus 5% interest on the awards from February 23, 1993 until the payments to Ha Sun-nyo, Park Tu-ri, Yu Chan-i, and Park So-duk were finished; from March 8, 1994 until payments to Park Sun-bok, Lee Yong-son, Kang Yong-jyu, Chong Su-ryon and Lee Sun-dok were finished; and from April 19, 1994 until payment to Yang Kum-dok was finished,
3. The Plaintiffs proposed an alternate request for the Defendant instead of option 2 if need be: the Defendant pays Plaintiffs Ha Sun-nyo, Park Tu-ri, and Lee Sun-dok 1 million yen plus 5% interest on the judgement from June 21, 1994 until payments were finished.
4. The Defendant pays all litigation expenses
5. Declaration of provisional execution for the second and third demands

The Defendants responded to the Plaintiff's claims in three points:

1. All of the Plaintiff's claims are subject to be dismissed
2. All litigation expenses should be paid by the Plaintiffs, not by the Defendant
3. The Declaration requested by the Plaintiffs should be in the form of a conditional security waiver

Upon conclusion of this trial, there were three official outcomes. First, the Japanese government was ordered to pay 300,000 yen each to Plaintiffs Ha Sun-nyo, Park Tu-ri, and Lee Sun-dok, as well as approximately 5% of the interest on the preceding judgment made on September 1, 1992, until the payment is complete in full. Additionally, the court also deemed any other claims or requests from the Plaintiffs officially dismissed. Lastly, the division of litigation expenses for the Plaintiffs was split two ways: the Plaintiffs were ordered to pay one-third while the Defendant would pay two-thirds. Additionally, the Defendant had to pay its own expenses entirely, and any other litigation costs were to be paid by the party that sustained those expenses. The remainder of the appeal, however, lacked legal basis and was therefore dismissed.

== Japanese response ==
Before the Shimonoseki trial, the Japanese government was consistently hesitant to make any type of extensive apology for their leading role in the harm of thousands of South Korean comfort women during World War II. This case is significant as it was the first time ever that the Japanese government had to financially compensate survivors of the comfort women system. Despite the original demands for 564,000,000 yen and a formal government apology from Japan, Japan's initial response up until this point of the trial was to refuse official compensation or state apologies, and would typically only offer surviving comfort women privately-raised funds. Hideaki Chikashita, presiding judge for the Shimonoseki hearing, originally expressed regret and remorse for Japan's role in the comfort women system. Still, the court ended up turning down any demands for a government-issued official apology as they felt they had "no obligation".

Additionally, the Japanese government appealed the decision that they must pay three of the Plaintiffs to the Hiroshima High Court in May 1998, and the appeal is currently under investigation. The Japanese government explained that the reason for the earlier ruling was rejected by the Tokyo High Court in a different lawsuit in 1999. In three relevant cases that are currently pending in high courts, lower courts favored the State, whereas five other cases are still being reviewed by district level courts and the Japanese government must keep the courts and relevant committees informed of these lawsuits.

To build on this, the government felt they did not exercise the "moral duty of the state" that the Plaintiffs originally stated. The reasoning for the lack of a legal duty to formally apologize and compensate victims is based on the Japanese Constitution. The explanation for this was that although the circumstances that the Comfort Women experience violated the Japanese Constitution by violating the "dignity of individuals" and was incredibly violent and depersonalizing, these events occurred prior to the official implementation of the Japanese Constitution and therefore shouldn't be applied to this trial without exceptional means. Instead, it was suggested that the Yamaguchi Prefectural Court examine the violence enacted upon the victims after the implementation of the Japanese Constitution.

As part of their defense claims, the Japanese government held themselves unaccountable under state doctrine, claiming that any possible rights that the plaintiffs may have had were now expired under the Japanese Civil Code's Statute of Limitations. In addition, the Japanese Government attempted to evade responsibility for their crimes against "Comfort Women" by establishing the Asian Women's Fund in July 1995, as a way to support non-governmental organizations focusing on women's issues. The Asian Women's Fund offered consolation money to the comfort women victims as means of atonement for Japan's past acts. However, this money was not a method of compensation paid in recognition of a legal duty from the Japanese government and was typically officiated through private over public means.

== South Korean response ==
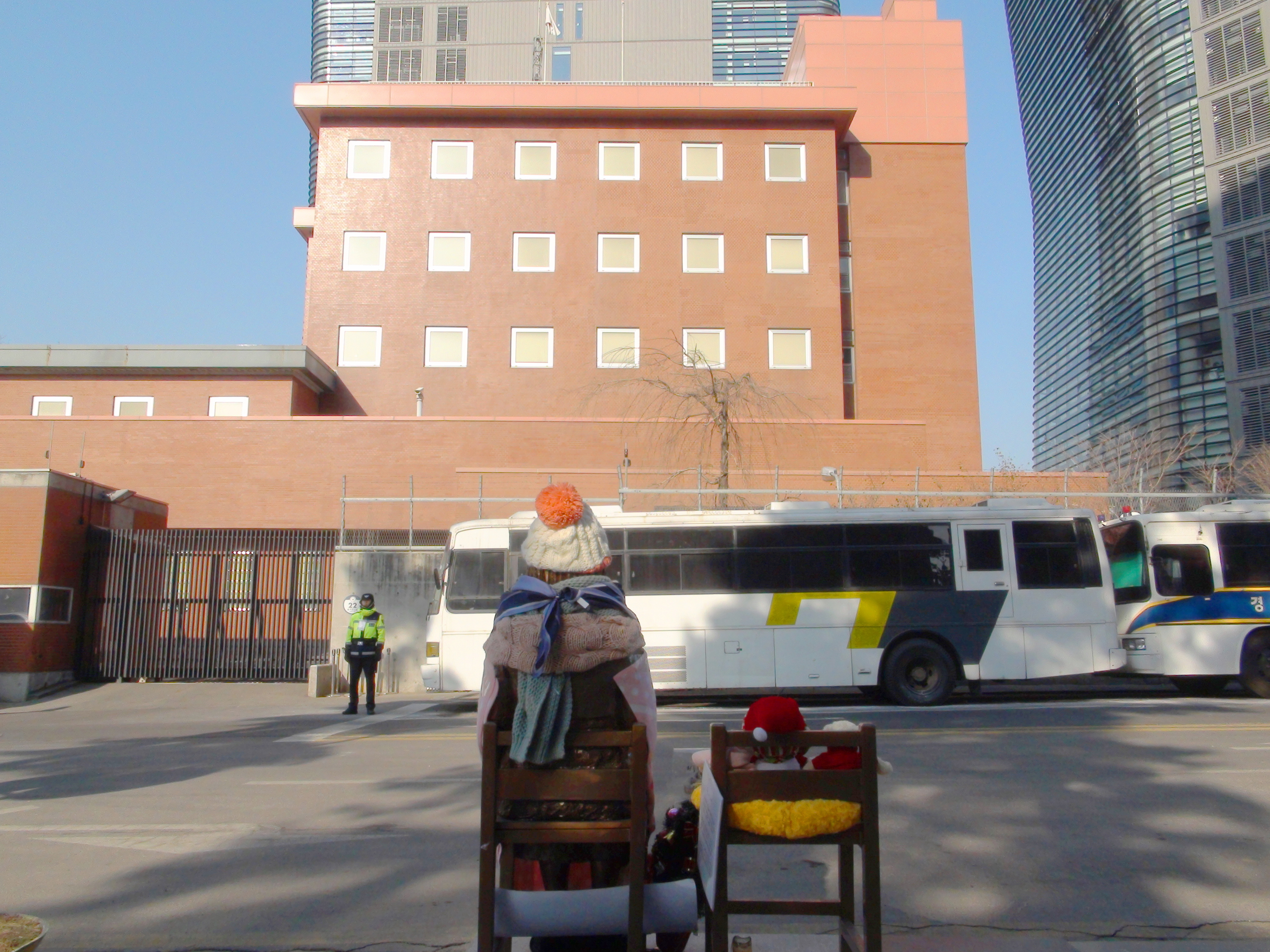
Comfort woman statue located outside of the Japanese Embassy in Seoul

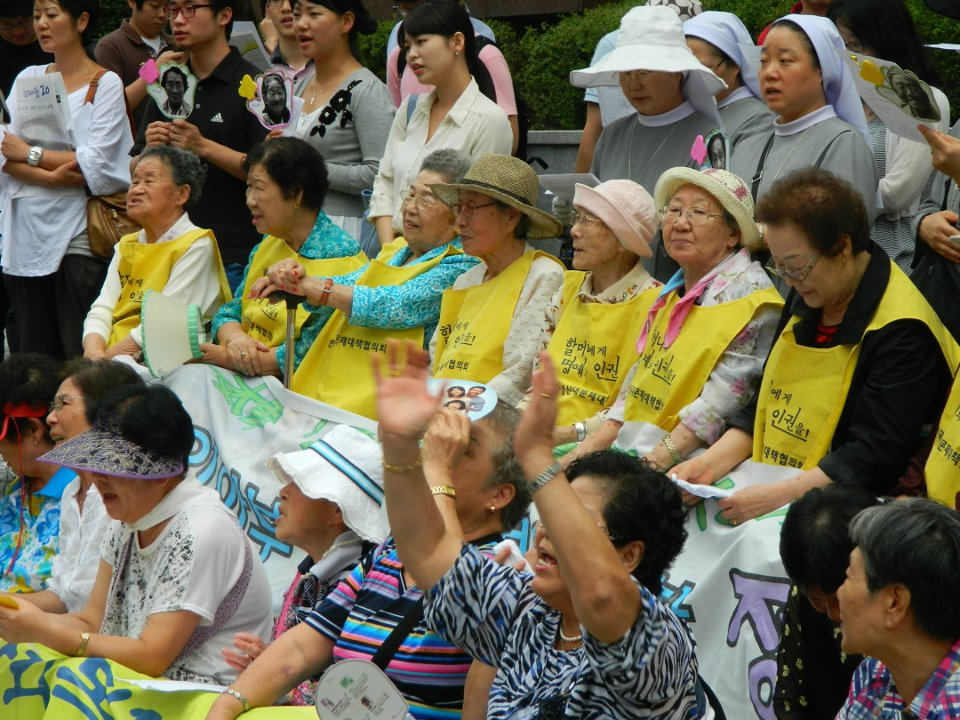
Rally in support of comfort women outside of the Japanese Embassy in Seoul, 2011

Following the events of the Shimonoseki Trial, the South Korean government furthered their efforts in preserving the history and memory of the comfort women. Civil society non-profit groups played an essential part in amplifying victim's voices and advocating for justice. Even before the Shimonoseki Trial began, one of the most potent displays from South Korean civil society groups, surviving comfort women, and other NGOs and individuals has been the weekly "Wednesday" Demonstrations held by The Korean Council for the Women Drafted for Military Sexual Slavery by Japan (KCWDMSS) that have taken place in front of the Japanese embassy in Seoul since 1992.

The consensus South Korean reaction to the development of the Asian Women's Fund by the Japanese government was that the Fund was a "devious ploy" whose "atonement monies" did not truly address the legal responsibility of the Japanese government and that therefore was not a form of official compensation to the victims of the comfort women system, despite its intentions to compensate for Japan's moral responsibility.

To counter efforts on the Japanese government's end to diminish the voices of Korean comfort women, many more NGOs were created to provide support in various ways. The Korean Council for Women Drafted for Military Sexual Slavery by Japan, led by activist Yun Chung-ok, was a loud voice in the activist sphere in support of Korean comfort women as they were outraged by Japan's initial position that their Imperial Army played no role in complacency in the appropriation of women for sexual purposes so, therefore, they didn't feel they bore any type of legal fault.

== International response ==
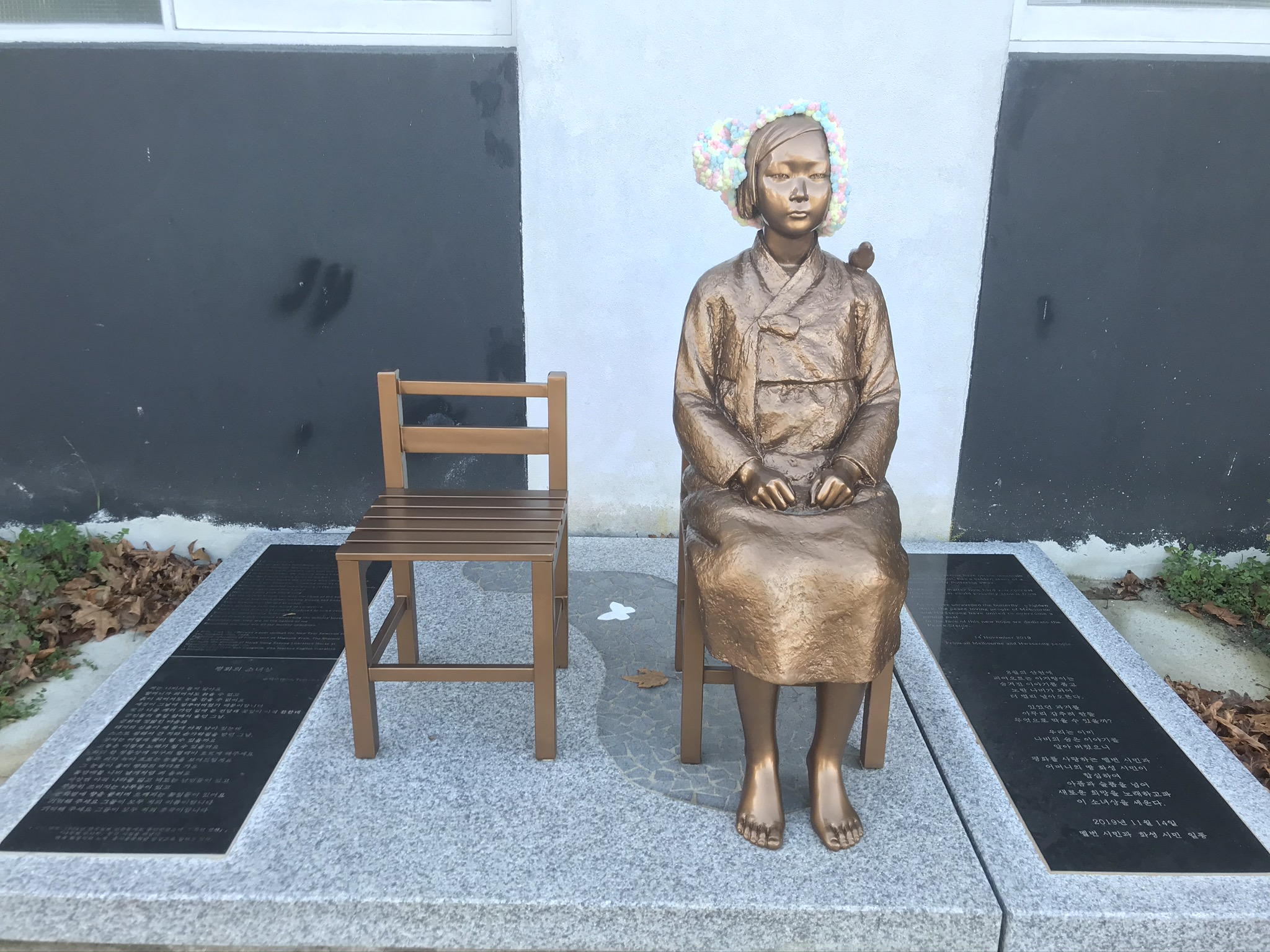
Statue commemorating comfort women at the Korean Society of Victoria, Melbourne, Australia

Violence (including sexual violence) against women was originally seen as a "by-product" of any armed conflict, and was considered to be rewarding to those successful amidst the conflict rather than a serious crime. But, as the Shimonoseki Trial of 1998 brought attention and awareness to the issue of comfort women and the immense pain they suffered, and as survivors grew more comfortable in sharing testimonies, international organizations like the United Nations began to look at the legal circumstances of classifying rape as a "legitimate war crime" and began devising ways to promote furthered accountability moving forward. On August 26, 1999, the UN High Commissioner for Human Rights subcommission created a resolution titled "1999/16" on Systematic Rape, sexual slavery, and slavery-like practices that refers to the McDougall report and encourages increased attention to protecting and rehabilitating victims of sexual violence like the South Korean comfort women in a wartime context, additionally with increased protections for collections of evidence and testimony of any witnesses in gender-based violence and sexual slavery. This resolution further calls for all member-states to implement and enforce legislation that incorporates international criminal legal perspectives into their national law systems to allow for comprehensive prosecution measures for acts of sexual violence committed during armed conflicts and wartime settings.
