= Chōsen Grand Exposition =

1940 exhibition in colonial Korea

Overview
- BIE-class: Unrecognized exposition
- Name: Chōsen Grand Exposition
- Area: 28 acres
- Organized by: Keijō Nippō newspaper

Participant(s)
- Countries: 4

Location
- Country: Korea
- City: Keijō (Seoul)
- Venue: Gyeongseong station

Timeline
- Opening: 1 September 1940

The Chōsen Grand Exposition (Japanese: 朝鮮大博覧会; Korean: 조선대박람회) was an exposition held on 1 September 1940 south of East Kyŏngsŏng Station (now Cheongnyangni Station), Keijō (Seoul), Chōsen (Korea), Empire of Japan. Its full name was Kigen Year 2600 Colonial Government 30th Anniversary Chōsen Grand Exposition (紀元二千六百年 始政三十周年記念 朝鮮大博覧会; 기원이천육백년 시정삼십주년기념 조선대박람회).

It was held in honor of the 2600th year of the Japanese calendar (kigen) and 30th anniversary of Japanese colonial rule in Korea. It was organised by the Keijō Nippō newspaper.

== Aims ==
The exhibition had three aims: to mark 2600 years of the Japanese Empire, 30 years of Japanese Government in Korea and to prepare the population for war.

== Architecture ==
Architecture was in modernism style, spread over 28 acres.

Pavilions included Booming of Korea, China, Manchuria and Manchurian settler's pavilion, both by the Korean-Manchurian Colonial Company, Mongolia pavilion, and Seoul.

The Holy War Street contained the Holy War Pavilion and War Achievements Pavilion both displaying battle scene dioramas and trophies from the second Sino-Japanese war.
