= 2006 in South Korean music =

== Debuting and disbanded in 2006 ==
=== Debuting groups ===
- 2NB
- Battle
- Big Bang
- Brown Eyed Girls
- DickPunks
- Eluphant
- Girl Friends
- Kingston Rudieska
- SeeYa
- Skasucks
- Super Junior-K.R.Y.
- Typhoon
- Vanilla Unity

=== Reformed groups ===
- Uptown

=== Solo debuts ===
- Ahyoomee
- Boom
- Brian Joo
- Crown J
- Ha Dong-kyun
- H-Eugene
- Jun Jin
- Kan Mi-youn
- Kim Jeong-hoon
- Kim Tae-woo
- Lee Joon-gi
- Park Jung-ah
- Primary
- Son Ho-young
- Sunmin
- Sunwoo Jung-a

=== Disbanded groups ===
- Baby V.O.X.
- Chakra
- Flower
- NRG
- Sugar

== Releases in 2006 ==
=== First quarter ===
==== January ====
Date	Title	Artist	Genre(s)
17	Missing Love (사랑을 놓치다)	Kim Yeon-woo	Ballad, Dance
20	Grace	Lee Soo-young	K-pop
24	Crazy For You	Lee Seung-gi	K-pop Pop
24	Harisu	Harisu	K-pop
26	Made in Sea	Bada	K-pop
26	Love	Vanilla Unity	Emo rock

==== February ====
Date	Title	Artist	Genre(s)
1	Deal in Coal	5tion	K-pop
1	Love Affair	KCM	R&B, Ballad
2	Crazy for You	Lee Seung-gi	K-pop, Ballad
7	Q Train	The Quiett	Hip hop
7	4 Season Story	Jang Hye-jin	R&B, Ballad
9	5˚	Hwayobi	K-pop, R&B
11	Dark Angel	Lee Hyori	K-pop Pop
13	bombom	Delispice	Rock
13	Black Swan Songs	Epik High	Alternative hip hop
23	Unlimited	Kim Kyung-ho	Hard rock
24	Regame the 2nd Fan Service	N.EX.T	Heavy metal
24	The First Mind	SeeYa	K-pop

==== March ====
Date	Title	Artist	Genre(s)
2	Your Story	Brown Eyed Girls	K-pop Pop
8	24/Seven	Se7en	K-pop Pop
9	Pinch Your Soul	Clazziquai Project	Electropop
13	Misty Memories	Lyn	K-pop
14	Purple Drop	Humming Urban Stereo	Electropop, Bossa Nova
21	Smile Again	Baek Ji-young	K-pop
23	Thanks	Lim Jeong-hee	K-pop Pop
27	Street Jazz In My Soul	Hyun Jin-young	Hip hop
31	Eluphant Bakery	Eluphant	Hip hop
31	One and Only	Crown J	Hip hop

=== Second quarter ===
==== April ====
Date	Title	Artist	Genre(s)
4	So Long...	Kim Bum-soo	K-pop
6	A Letter From Abell 1689	MayBee	R&B
8	The 3rd Masterpiece	SG Wannabe	K-pop
13	Fourth Letter (네 번째 편지)	Kim Jong-Kook	K-pop
14	Reason of Dead Bugs	Sinawe	Alternative Rock, Heavy Metal
14	Yutzpracachia's Love	Tony Ahn	K-pop
20	Rebirth of Regent	Lee Jung	K-pop
24	Effect	Buzz	Pop rock
28	Gummy Unplugged	Gummy	R&B

==== May ====
Date	Title	Artist	Genre(s)
10	Masstige	Sunwoo Jung-a	Ballad
11	State of the Art	Shinhwa	K-pop, Pop
11	Fountain of Tears (눈물샘)	Byul	K-pop
11	The HERO	Crying Nut	Punk rock
16	Together	M. Street	K-pop, Ballad
17	Dance With Hyun Jung	Kim Hyun-jung	Dance, R&B
24	Troika	Typhoon	K-pop
24	Seventh EVEning	Eve	Glam rock
26	Testimony	Uptown	Hip hop

==== June ====
Date	Title	Artist	Genre(s)
19	The Club	CSJH The Grace	K-pop Pop
27	Stand Alone	Ha Dong-kyun	K-pop
28	Old & New	Can	Hard rock

=== Third quarter ===
==== July ====
Date	Title	Artist	Genre(s)
6	Buy Turtles	Turtles	Hip hop
7	U	Super Junior	K-pop Pop
14	Milk Cattle at the OK Corral	Crying Nut	Punk rock
15	24/SE7EN Repackage Album	Se7en	K-pop Pop
18	The First Rain	The TRAX	Rock
24	Ssajib	Psy	K-pop Pop
25	Summer	Harisu	K-pop
29	Another Myself	Girl Friends	K-pop

==== August ====
Date	Title	Artist	Genre(s)
18	Thank You I Can Smile Again	Baek Ji-young	K-pop
25	Your Story	Brown Eyed Girls	K-pop Pop
25	Yeah	Park Jung-ah	K-pop
26	Peace 'N' Rock 'N' Roll	Cherry Filter	Rock
28	Beyond the Blue Sky	Paran	K-pop
29	Only One Way	H-Eugene	Hip hop

==== September ====
Date	Title	Artist	Genre(s)
4	Turn a Deaf Ear	Baechigi	Hip hop
12	When a Man Loves a Woman	Lee Seung-gi	K-pop, Ballad
14	Yes	Son Ho-young	K-pop
18	London Koyote	Koyote	K-pop Pop
19	Refreshing	Kan Mi-youn	K-pop
21	Healing Process	Nell	Alternative rock
25	The Way I Am	MC Mong	Hip hop
26	Evolution of Rhythm	Hong Kyung-min	Pop rock
27	Reflection of Sound	Lee Seung-chul	Soft rock, Ballad
28	LPG2	LPG	K-pop
29	"O"-Jung.Ban.Hap.	TVXQ	K-pop Pop

=== Fourth quarter ===
==== October ====
Date	Title	Artist	Genre(s)
10	The Ballads	Sung Si-kyung	Pop Ballad
10	Fantastic Girl	Lee Jung-hyun	K-pop
12	For the People	Big Mama	K-pop, pop
14	Rain's World	Rain	K-pop, pop
25	My Way	Jang Woo-hyuk	K-pop, pop
25	5 Stella Lights	Kim Jeong-hoon	K-pop
26	Solo Special (하고 싶은 말)	Kim Tae-woo	K-pop
30	Monochrome	Humming Urban Stereo	Electropop, Bossa Nova

==== November ====
Date	Title	Artist	Genre(s)
1	Se7olution	Se7en	K-pop, pop
2	H.I.S. Monologue	Yiruma	Piano
10	S.T 01 Now	SS501	K-pop, pop
10	Hwantastic	Lee Seung-hwan	Pop ballad
15	The Very Surprise	Gavy NJ	K-pop
15	Love Doesn't Come	Jun Jin	K-pop
17	12 Tears Of Farewell (이별이 남기는 12가지 눈물)	As One	K-pop
28	For the Christmas	Big Mama	K-pop
30	Take It All	Take	Ballad, dance

==== December ====
Date	Title	Artist	Genre(s)
1	Because All Love is Like That (사랑은 다 그런거니까)	Wax	R&B, Ballad
1	Bigbang Vol.1	Big Bang	K-pop
11	Follow Your Soul	Bobby Kim	Hip hop
18	The Brian	Brian Joo	K-pop

== See also ==
- 2006 in South Korea
- List of South Korean films of 2006
