= Foxy Lady (disambiguation) =

"Foxy Lady" is the name of a popular song originally recorded by Jimi Hendrix.

Foxy Lady may also refer to:

- Foxy Lady (Cher album) (1972)
- Foxy Lady (RuPaul album) (1996)
- Foxy Lady (Harisu album) (2004)
- Foxy Lady (Hang on the Box album) (2004)
- Foxy Lady (film), a 1971 film by Ivan Reitman
- Foxy Lady (TV series), a 1982-84 ITV TV Series
- "Fox-y Lady", a 2009 episode of Family Guy
- Foxy Lady (manga), a 2002 fantasy manga
- Foxy Lady, a sailboat captured by the Khmer Rouge on 13 August 1978
