= Yellow Hair 2 =

2001 film by Kim Yu-min

- Theatrical poster
- Hangul: 노랑머리 2
- RR: Norangmeori 2
- MR: Norangmŏri 2
- Directed by: Kim Yu-min
- Written by: Kim Yu-min
- Produced by: Yu Jae-hak
- Starring: Harisu; Shin Yi; Mo Hong-jin; Yoon Chan
- Cinematography: Lee Kang-min; Kim Dong-eun
- Edited by: Kim Yu-mi; Choi Jae-geun
- Music by: Kim Shin
- Distributed by: Fiction Bank
- Release date: 21 July 2001
- Running time: 109 minutes
- Country: South Korea
- Language: Korean
- Budget: $1 million

Yellow Hair 2 (Korean: 노랑머리 2; RR: Norangmeori 2) is a 2001 South Korean film, written, produced, and directed by Kim Yu-min. It is the sequel to Kim's 1999 film Yellow Hair, though it does not continue the same story or feature any of the same characters. The original film gained attention when it was refused a rating due to its sexual content, requiring some footage to be cut before it was allowed a public release. Yellow Hair 2 attracted no less attention from the casting of transgender actress Harisu in her first major film role.

The film's English title is sometimes given as The Blonde 2 or Running Blue.

== Cast ==
- Harisu as J, a transgender biker who works as a nightclub singer
- Shin Yi as Y, a convenience store clerk and aspiring actress
- Mo Hong-jin as R, a videographer
- Yoon Chan as M, J's boyfriend

Character names are not given during the course of the film, but are taken from the end credits.

== Plot ==
The first half of the film is told in a non-consecutive narrative format, introducing the three principal characters in turn and taking them up to the events in the convenience store. There are four chapters: "Pornography in Blue", "A Space Man", "Documentary" and "Last Scene".

=== Pornography in Blue ===
Y breaks up with her boyfriend (also her agent), who she believes has done little to promote her acting career, but he tries to blackmail her with a video of the two of them having sex. She turns to her boss at the store for help, but he only agrees if she will sleep with him. Later that evening, Y makes up with her boyfriend, but then discovers that her boss has also been videotaping her as she changes in the store's back room. Working behind the counter in the convenience store, she takes a cheque from J to pay for some beer.

=== A Space Man ===
J meets M while singing in a club in Thailand. They fall in love and continue seeing each other back in Korea, until one day M announces that he has to go on a trip without her. On the day of his return, J prepares a meal for the two of them at her apartment. She is overjoyed when he finally shows up, until she realizes that his parents are with him. M's father has found out that J is transgender, and demands to see her ID card as proof. When she refuses he starts to fling food at her, and J asks them all to leave.

A short while later, she goes into Y's convenience store and uses a cheque to buy some beer. When the store's boss demands to see her ID, she turns in anger and smashes a bottle of beer over his head.

=== Documentary ===
R carries his camcorder with him wherever he goes, videotaping everyday life. Eventually he walks into Y's convenience store. As he gets something to drink, the boss walks out of the back room and demands to see J's ID card. R begins taping the incident. J smashes the beer bottle over the boss's head. Y tries to comfort him, but he slips on the spilt beer and falls, banging his head against R's camera case. Blood flows out onto the floor, and the boss is apparently dead.

J, Y and R decide to accept joint responsibility for the boss's death. They drag the body into the back room, clean up the blood, then leave. After getting into a fight in a bar, the trio retreat to a hotel room. Y and R have sex, while J lies curled up on the floor, remembering the time she spent with M in Thailand. Meanwhile, M gets drunk at J's apartment, distraught over his feelings for her.

After a few days, the trio go to another bar. As they are drinking and trying to decide what to do next, several police officers come in to check IDs. The three leave without paying their bill, and are chased down a back alley by one of the officers. As they run, Y trips and falls, forcing J to wait and trip the officer, who drops his gun. She picks up the gun and points it at him as he lies on the ground, but he quickly gets the better of her. When the other two come back to help her, he begins berating them one by one, only ending when J clubs the officer over the head with the camera case. Having had enough, R decides to leave.

Y and J find a hotel room, where they console each other and begin goofing around. The following day they leave on J's motorcycle, going to Y's family home. It turns out that Y has a young daughter who is being looked after by her parents, and it's her birthday. Y leaves a birthday cake but refuses to stay, and returns the motorcycle. J, however, is nowhere to be seen. Suddenly someone grabs the clerk's hair.

The convenience store boss is not dead, as they had believed. He and a friend of his have taken Y and J to a private karaoke room. The friend forces Y to undress and dance while he sings karaoke. The boss again demands that J show him her ID card, but instead she pulls the police officer's gun out of her bag and shoots both men dead. Again the two women find a room to stay. They lie tenderly together, naked, and J tells the clerk that one day, they'll go away somewhere warm together.

Later, the two of them are getting their hair styled in a salon when Y sees her ex-boyfriend on TV. He has now become a big star, and she throws the TV to the ground in a fit of rage.

=== Last scene ===
Y meets her ex-boyfriend in a café, and she uses their sex video to blackmail him for money. She then goes with J on a spending spree, in preparation for their trip to Thailand. They return to J's apartment, where M has been waiting. J takes him inside to talk, leaving Y outside. Still feeling distraught, M threatens to kill himself with a bottle of pills. J pours the pills out and sweeps them into the trash, telling him that they won't be enough. She gives him the gun, then leaves, going into the bathroom to cry. M goes out into the street, where he sees Y in a phone booth. Mistaking her for J, he shoots her in the head and then kills himself. J comes outside to find them both dead, and she is now left alone.

== Release and critical response ==
Filmed on a budget of $1 million, Yellow Hair 2 was released in South Korea on 21 July 2001, and received 26,440 admissions in Seoul.

Derek Elley of Variety noted the film's "focus on rootless young people" as a thematic link to the original film, and regarded it as "a semi-verite study of lonesome youth that has its moments between longueurs". Park Soo-in of The Korea Times found the director's message in the film to be unclear, stating that while the film's title was supposed to symbolize the "overthrow of convention", this could not "simply be two naked women lying together to show sisterhood or to freely use guns to solve problems".

Yellow Hair 2 was screened at the 26th San Francisco International LGBT Film Festival.

== Soundtrack ==
Yellow Hair 2 OST

Soundtrack album by various artists
- Released: July 23, 2001
- Length: 39:28
- Languages: Korean, English
- Label: Doremi Records Co.

Besides starring in the film, Harisu also contributed two songs to the soundtrack, "Paradise" and "Sad Love". The soundtrack was released by Doremi Records Co. in 2001.

=== Track listing ===
1. "그리움은 비로울고" – 1.35
2. "Upside Down" – 2.50
3. "Upside Down" (Short Ver.) – 0.45
4. "Chaos" – 2.50
5. "라스트 씬이 열리면" – 0.43
6. "라스트 씬이 열리면" – 3.53
7. "북두의 권" – 3.25
8. "Paradise" – 3.45
9. "Jungle Forever" – 4.20
10. "추억의 거울 #1" – 1.08
11. "지구로의 귀환" – 1.28
12. "지구로의 귀환" – 0.58
13. "We Wanna F.L.B" – 2.42
14. "Sad Love" – 4.06
15. "추억의 거울 #2" – 2.14
16. "바다가 꾸는 꿈은...너" – 2.39

== See also ==
- Transgender in film and television
