= Kim Seok-Kwun =

South Korean plastic surgeon (born 1952)

- Born: 1952; Seoul, South Korea
- Occupation: Plastic surgeon
- Years active: 1986–present

Kim Seok-Kwun (Korean: 김석권; Hanja: 金碩權; born 1952) is a South Korean surgeon at Dong-A University Hospital. Kim is regarded as a key figure in advancing transgender healthcare and shaping public attitudes about gender identity in South Korea. He has faced criticism in the country for his surgical work.

== Early life and education ==
Kim was born into an upper middle-class family in Hadong County, near the city of Busan. He graduated from Dong-A High School in Busan and Pusan National University School of Medicine, where he initially studied craniofacial surgeries. In the 1980s, several individuals approached him for sex reassignment procedures. Kim subsequently left Korea to study at the University of California, Davis.

== Career ==
In 1986, Kim performed the first known male-to-female sex reassignment surgery in South Korea. In 1991, he carried out his first female-to-male surgery.

Kim's work remained largely unpublicized until he performed feminizing surgery for Harisu in 1995. This garnered international media attention, and helped bring transgender issues into mainstream awareness in South Korea.

Most of Kim's patients are in their 40s and 50s.
