= Hi Honey =

Hi Honey may refer to:

- Hi! Honey (TV series), 2004 Taiwanese TV series
- Hi Honey, 2011 short film with Marco Grazzini
- Hi Honey (album), 2015 album by Low Cut Connie
