= The First Live Concert =

Video by Harisu
- Released: July 29, 2002
- Genre: K-Pop
- Label: Spectrum DVD

The First Live Concert is a live music video by South Korean entertainer Harisu. The video is a recording of Harisu's first concert, and mostly highlights songs from her debut album, Temptation, though she also covers songs by the likes of Robert Palmer and Eurythmics. The video was released on VHS and VCD formats on July 29, 2002.

== Track listing ==
1. "Opening"
2. "Prologue"
3. "Knife"
4. "Shadow"
5. "D-Day"
6. "비밀 (Secret)"
7. "Memory"
8. "Dancing Team (WaWa)"
9. "악몽 (Nightmare)"
10. "Love Hurt"
11. "하리수 동영상 (Harisu's Video Clip)"
12. "Sweet Dreams (Are Made of This)"
13. "She Bop"
14. "She Works Hard for the Money"
15. "Bad Case of Loving You (Doctor, Doctor)"
16. "여행을 떠나요 (Let's Go on a Trip)"
17. "하리수 동영상 (Harisu's Video Clip)"
18. "Temptation" (remix)
19. "Don't Stop"
20. "Shadow"
21. "Fantasy"
22. "Love Hurt"
23. "Temptation" (encore)
24. "D-Day" (concert version)
25. "Temptation" (music video)
26. "Love Hurt" (music video)
