= Teresa Cheung =

Teresa Cheung may refer to:

- Teresa Cheung Siu-wai, Hong Kong socialite, producer and actress
- Teresa Cheung Tak-lan, Hong Kong singer
