= Han Ji-sang =

South Korean actor (born 1982)

- Born: July 25, 1982 (age 44); Seoul, South Korea
- Occupation: Actor
- Years active: 2003–present

Korean name
- Hangul: 한지상
- RR: Han Jisang
- MR: Han Chisang

Han Ji-sang (born July 25, 1982) is a South Korean actor. Han debuted as a stage actor in the musical Grease.

Han Ji Sang is also one of the top 5 most wanted actors in musicals.

On July 25, 2014, Han successfully held his concert Han Ji Sang Premium Concert in Tokyo at Tokyo Hall in Tokyo, Japan.

In 2019 Han Ji Sang was cast as the voice of "Jack" for Disney's Marry Poppins Returns, the actor sang several songs for the movie including "Lovely London Sky" and the biggest musical sequence in the movie "Trip a little light fantastic".

== Early life ==
Han was born in Seoul. One month after his birth, his family suddenly left for France. He was in Paris until 4-years old and attended Kindergarten there. Then he was fluent in French but could not remember any of it now.

Jisang's family resided in New York City for two years where he attended elementary school before returning to Korea.

According to Jisang he suffered from Dyslexia and Obsessive Compulsive Disorder but was an honor student with good grades and served as the vice president of his class.

== Theater ==
Year	Title	Role
2003	Grease	
2009	Don Juan	Raphael
2009	Assassins	Samuel Byck
2013	Next to Normal	Gabe
2013	Jesus Christ Superstar	Judas Iscariot
2013	The Scarlet Pimpernel	Percy Blakeney
2013	Bonnie & Clyde	Clyde Barrow
2013	Red	Ken
2014	Murder Ballad	Tom
2014	Frankenstein	Henry/monster
2014	The Devil	X
2015	Jesus Christ Superstar	Judas Iscariot
2015	Frankenstein	Henry/Monster
2017	Death Note: The Musical	Light Yagami
2017	Napoleon	Napoleon
2018	Amadeus	Salieri
2018	Frankenstein	Henry/Monster
2018	Sand Glass	
2018	A Gentleman's Guide to Love and Murder	
2019	Benhur	Benhur
2019	King Arthur	Arthur
2019	A Better Tomorrow	Ja Geol
2022	Musical M	M

== Filmography ==
=== Film ===
Year	Title	Role
2015	Three Summer Nights	Chief of criminal investigation (cameo)
2017	Blue Busking	Min-woo

=== Television series ===
Year	Title	Role	Network
2014	Rosy Lovers	Park Kang-tae	MBC
2016	Working Mom Parenting Daddy	Cha Il-mok	MBC
2018	Welcome to Waikiki	Tae-hyun (cameo, ep. 2 & 3)	JTBC
2019	Haechi	Do Ji-kwang	SBS
2019	Catch the Ghost	Ko Do Nam	tvN
2022	Unlock My Boss	Choi Seong-jun	ENA

=== Entertainment ===
Year	Title	Role	Episode(s)	Network
2014–2015	Immortal Songs: Singing the Legend	Contestant	157, 183, 184, 213, 227	KBS
2020	Double Casting	Judge		tvN

== Awards and nominations ==
Year	Award	Category	Nominated work	Result
2012	6th Daegu International Musical Festival	Best Actor		Won
2013	Seoul Musical Festival	Yegreen Award for Best Actor		Won
2019	3rd Korea Musical Awards	Best Supporting Actor	Gentleman's Guide	Won
