= Blue Busking =

2017 film directed by Ahn Jae-seok

- Theatrical poster
- Hangul: 마차 타고 고래고래
- Lit.: Riding a wagon, shouting at the top of one's lungs
- RR: Macha tago goraegorae
- MR: Mach'a t'ago koraegorae
- Directed by: Ahn Jae-seok
- Screenplay by: Ahn Jae-seok; Cho Won-dong
- Produced by: Shin Byoung-hun
- Cinematography: Jung Kee-won
- Edited by: Jung Jin-hee; Kim Hyung-joo
- Music by: Kim Shin-eui
- Production company: Asia Bridge Contents
- Distributed by: Wide Release, Inc.
- Release dates: August 2016 (JIMFF); 18 May 2017 (South Korea)
- Running time: 97 minutes
- Country: South Korea
- Language: Korean
- Box office: US$48,983

Blue Busking (Korean: 마차 타고 고래고래; RR: Macha tago goraegorae; lit. 'Riding a wagon, shouting at the top of one's lungs') is a 2016 South Korean musical comedy film directed by Ahn Jae-seok.

It is a remake of the Italian film Basilicata Coast to Coast by Rocco Papaleo.

== Plot ==
Four friends from Mokpo who formed a band in high school are now grown men dealing with the challenges of life. Frontman Min-woo is a lecturer tied down by work and marriage; drummer Ho-bin is a struggling actor; guitarist Young-min has withdrawn into silence due to a heartbreak; and bassist Byeong-tae—Ho-bin’s younger brother—is on the verge of losing his job at a stable. They are accepted to perform at the Jarasum Music Festival, a dream they have held since their teenage days and their last chance to make music together. The group comes up with an adventurous plan: to travel on foot rather than by car. They decide to spend a month walking from Mokpo to Gapyeong, busking along the way, with a donkey named Jjang-a pulling a cart full of their luggage as their travel companion. Hye-kyung, a TV producer from a regional station, is persuaded to join them to film a documentary. She is far from enthusiastic about the proposal, viewing their endeavor as a childish stunt, but as time goes by, she becomes captivated by their initiative and the motivations behind it. The journey alternates between moments of joy and tension that put their trip to the festival at risk. Ultimately, this plan proves fundamental for them to rediscover themselves and face a new chapter of their lives.

== Cast ==
- Jo Han-sun as Ho-bin
- Han Ji-sang as Min-woo
- Park Hyo-joo as Hye-kyung
- Kim Shin-eui as Young-min
- Kim Jae-bum as Byeong-tae
- Yoon Kyung-ho as Hyeon-woo
- Yang Ye-seung as Min-sook

=== Special appearance ===
- Cho Jin-woong as Reporter Seo
- Linzy as Jane

== Production ==
The film was shot in various South Korean locations, following National Route 1 (from which the band's name is also derived), connecting the country's north and south along the western coast. It was developed alongside a 2015 musical called Goraegorae (Korean: 고래고래; lit. 'Shouting at the top of one's lungs'), which featured actors from the film, such as Han Ji-sang, Kim Shin-eui, and Kim Jae-bum. It is the first work in South Korea to be conceived as both a film and a musical. The music was directed by Kim Shin-eui and includes rearranged songs by rock band Monni, of which he is the lead singer.

== Release ==
The film premiered at the Jecheon International Music & Film Festival in 2016. All the tickets were sold out in nineteen seconds. The film was released in theatres in South Korea on 18 May 2017.

== Reception ==
=== Box office ===
As an independent film, it grossed $48,983 from 8,971 admissions

=== Critical response ===
The film was met with average reviews. It scored 4 out of 10 on Cine21; reviewer Kim Soo-bin appreciated the concept and the music but felt the film, unlike the original, failed to organically blend the soundtrack with the narrative. She noted it was more concentrated on the characters' relationship rather than their busking performances. She also found the cinematography focused too much on the characters, missing the opportunity to showcase the scenery along the route. Baek Jong-hyun writing for Magazine M considered the film enjoyable, yet criticized its simplistic narrative, with moments of crisis and joy both bypassed too easily. William Schwartz of HanCinema praised the music and the background scenery, and found several scenes amusing, but he was not impressed by the plot and the character development. While professional critics were somewhat unenthusiastic, viewers on Naver responded positively to the film, giving it an average score of 8.76 out of 10.

=== Accolades ===
Award	Category	Recipient	Result	Year	Ref
38th Golden Cinematography Awards	Best New Director	Ahn Jae-seok	Won	2018	
38th Golden Cinematography Awards	Best New Actor	Kim Shin-eui	Won	2018	
