= Syndrome (TV series) =

- Promotional poster
- Genre: Romance; Medical drama
- Written by: Kim Sol-ji
- Directed by: Lee Sung-joo
- Starring: Han Hye-jin; Song Chang-eui; Park Gun-hyung
- Country of origin: South Korea
- Original language: Korean
- No. of episodes: 20

Production
- Production location: Korea
- Production companies: Urban Works Media iWill Media

Original release
- Network: JTBC
- Release: February 13 – April 17, 2012

Syndrome (Korean: 신드롬) is a 2012 South Korean medical drama series, starring Han Hye-jin, Song Chang-eui and Park Gun-hyung. It is set in the world of neurosurgery where a medical student finds herself in a love triangle with two fellow doctors. The television series aired on JTBC from February 13 to April 17, 2012 on Mondays and Tuesdays at 21:55 (KST) for 20 episodes.

== Synopsis ==
Lee Hae-jo (Han Hye-jin) is a first year resident specializing in neurosurgery. She didn't graduate from a premier medical school, but she is determined to become the best neurosurgeon. Cha Yeo-wook (Song Chang-eui) is also a first year neurosurgery resident. Unlike Hae-jo, Cha Yeo-wook graduated from the best medical school and is the grandson of the chairman of the board at the Korea University Hospital. His background to become a doctor is impeccable. Kang Eun-hyun (Park Gun-hyung) is the chief resident of neurosurgery. A love triangle begins between these three people.

== Cast ==
- Han Hye-jin as Lee Hae-jo
- Song Chang-eui as Cha Yeo-wook
- Park Gun-hyung as Kang Eun-hyun
- Jo Jae-hyun as Cha Tae-jin
- Kim Sung-ryung as Oh Eun-hee
- Kim Yu-seok as Min Sung-joon
- Im Byung-gi as Lee Gyu-jo (Hae-jo's father)
- Im Won-hee as Oh Gwang-hee
- Um Hyo-sup as Park Sun-woo
- Yoon Ji-min as Kim Yi-joon
- Jang Sung-won as Heo Jo-kang
- Kim Dong-hyeon as Lee Jae-yoon
- Baek Ok-dam as Ko Ah-reum
- Cha Min-ji as Min-jee

== International broadcast ==
Country	Network(s)/Station(s)	Series premiere	Title
South Korea	JTBC	February 13, 2012 – April 17, 2012 (JTBC月火連續劇)	신드롬 (드라마) ( ; lit: )
Thailand	AMRIN TV HD (อมรินทร์ทีวี)	August 3, 2015 – August 28, 2015 (every Monday to Friday at 14:00 – 15:50)	ผ่าปมปริศนา ( ; lit: )
