= Harisu =

South Korean entertainer (born 1975)

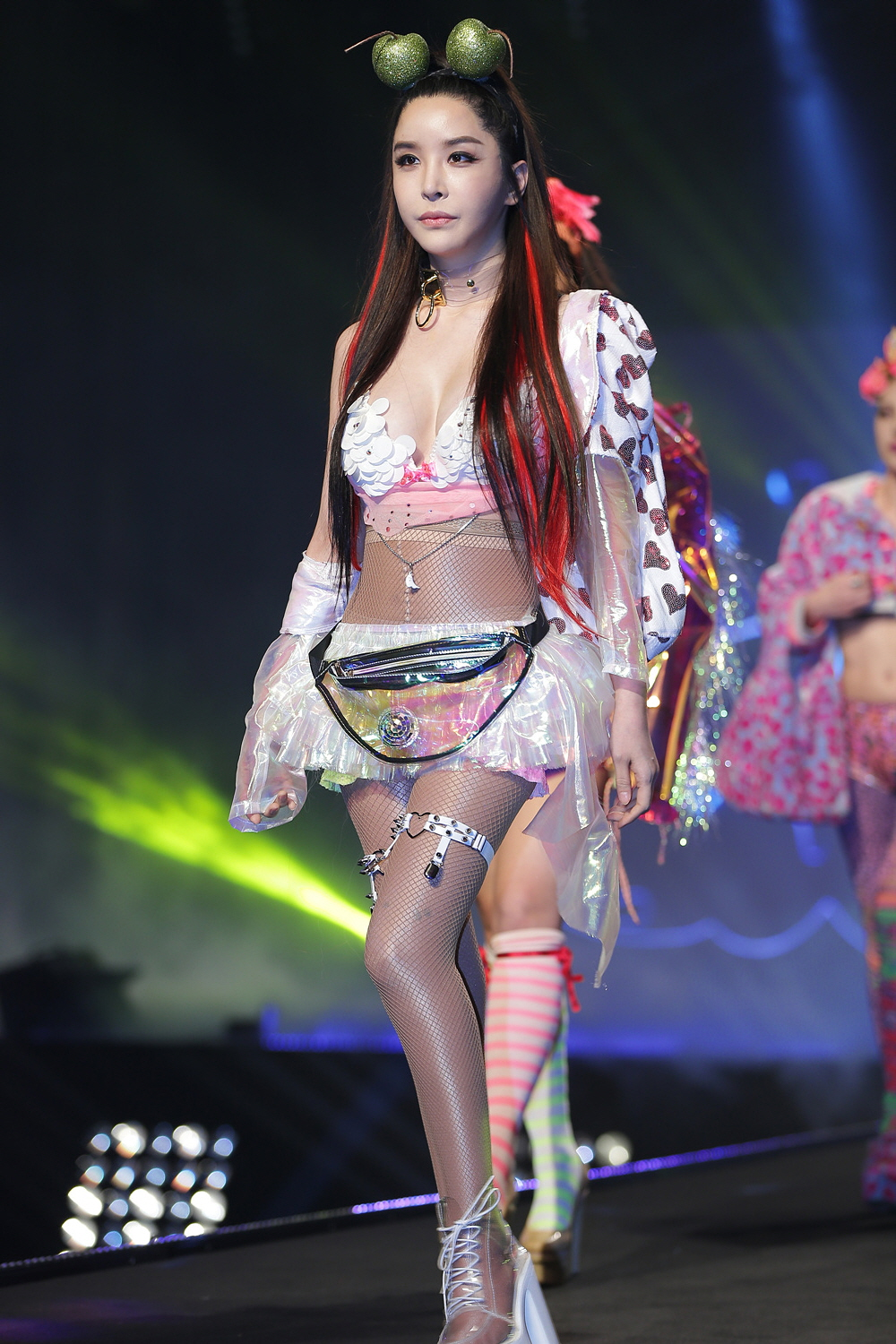
- Harisu in 2018
- Born: February 17, 1975 (age 51); Seongnam, South Korea
- Other name: He Li Xiu (Chinese name)
- Spouse: Micky Jung (m. 2007; div. 2017)
- Modeling information
- Height: 1.68 m (5 ft 6 in)
- Hair color: Black
- Eye color: Brown

Korean name
- Hangul: 이경은
- Hanja: 李慶恩
- RR: I Gyeongeun
- MR: I Kyŏngŭn

Stage name
- Hangul: 하리수
- Hanja: 河莉秀
- RR: Harisu
- MR: Harisu

Lee Kyung-eun (Korean: 이경은; born February 17, 1975), better known by her stage name Harisu (하리수), is a South Korean pop singer, model, and actress. In 2002, she became the second person in Korea to legally change their gender. Her stage name is an adaptation of the English phrase "hot issue".

She first gained public attention in 2001, after appearing in a television commercial for DoDo cosmetics. The commercial was a success and marked the launch of her career, which allowed her to branch out into other fields such as music and acting. She has recorded five Korean musical albums, switching genres between techno and R&B, and her overseas releases have featured songs recorded in Mandarin. Her first major acting role was in the 2001 film Yellow Hair 2, and since then her credits have included Hi! Honey, a Taiwanese drama series, and Colour Blossoms, an erotic drama by Hong Kong filmmaker Yonfan. On May 19, 2007, Harisu married Micky Jung, but the couple divorced in 2017.

== Early life and transition ==
Harisu was born in Seongnam, Korea, and is one of five children.^{[a]} Although assigned male at birth, she knew she was female from an early age, recalling, "I was always a girl who loved playing with dolls." This did not go unnoticed by her family or school friends, who often remarked that she looked and acted like a girl. A failed relationship with a boy during her teenage years convinced Harisu of the need to change her sex, and by the time she graduated from the all-boys Naksaeng High School, she was already undergoing hormone replacement therapy. It was for this reason that she was exempted from the military service usually required of males in the Republic of Korea, being rejected on the grounds of "mental illness". By the end of the 1990s, Harisu had undergone several surgeries in Korea and Japan, including breast augmentation, sex reassignment surgery, rhinoplasty, and surgery to increase the size of her hips.^{[b]}

Harisu lived in Japan for several years, where she studied to be a hair stylist. It was while working as a nightclub singer that she was discovered by a talent agency, and soon after she began her career as a model. After returning to Korea in 2000, she signed with management company TTM Entertainment, and first began using the stage name "Harisu", derived from the English phrase "hot issue".^{[c]}

== Career ==
=== Debut ===
Harisu first gained public attention when she appeared in this TV commercial for DoDo cosmetics. The appearance of an Adam's apple was added digitally.

Harisu made her acting debut in 1991—prior to her transition—as a supporting actor in a high school TV drama series, and this was followed by other minor film and TV roles as an extra during the 1990s.

Her big break came in early 2001, when she appeared in a TV commercial for DoDo cosmetics. The commercial hinted at the fact she is transgender, zooming in to reveal her Adam's apple (although this was added digitally, since Harisu herself does not have a prominent Adam's apple). DoDo were initially cautious about using the commercial and had been prepared to withdraw it if the response was negative, but the commercial turned out to be a big success and quickly established her as a celebrity. As the Republic of Korea's first transgender entertainer, there was a great deal of media interest in Harisu, and she was routinely described as being "more beautiful than a woman". Explaining her reasons for "coming out", she said, "I don't want to face people dishonestly. I won't be able to hide it after all. It's better to make it clear from the start." In June 2001, Harisu was the subject of a television documentary produced by KBS, which covered her childhood, family relationships, and debut as an entertainer.

Later that year she was cast in the film Yellow Hair 2, her first leading role. In addition to contributing songs for the film's soundtrack, Harisu played a transgender woman who goes on the run after the apparent death of a convenience store owner. Regarding her decision to appear in the film, she said, "I wanted to break the stereotype of transsexuals — the demureness and extreme weakness with which they are often portrayed." The film was released on July 21.

In 2001, Harisu published her autobiography, Eve from Adam, and appeared in a music video for dance group Turbo. In September, she entered the K-pop music scene with her debut album, Temptation, a mix of techno-style pop music and slow ballads, which peaked at number 32 on the MIAK (Music Industry Association of Korea) K-pop albums chart. She released her second album, Liar, in October 2002, describing it as "a high-energy dance record with a very upbeat rhythm." Liar became her biggest domestic chart success, reaching number 23 in its first month of release.

=== 2003–2005 ===
In October 2003, Harisu made the decision to leave her management company, TTM Entertainment. However, TTM claimed to hold the rights to her stage name, and announced their intentions to use that name to promote other artists. The matter was taken to court, and in early 2004 the ruling went in favour of Harisu, allowing her to keep the name. She subsequently set up her own company, G&F Entertainment, in order to make her own decisions regarding her career. In February she released her third album, Foxy Lady, which marked a change from the sound of her previous albums towards a more hip-hop/R&B style, with Harisu saying "now I am on my own, and showing my true colors, doing exactly the kind of music that I've always wanted." The album, however, failed to make the top 50 in the Korean charts.

In 2004, Harisu began to develop her career overseas, expressing frustration at being "pigeon-holed" as a transgender individual in Korea. She starred in the Taiwanese drama series Hi! Honey alongside local celebrity Pace Wu, despite not being fluent in Mandarin (her lines were spoken in Korean and later dubbed). She drew attention by promoting sanitary napkins in a series of advertisements for Taiwanese company UFT, for which she was paid an estimated ₩100 million per ad. Although she had been initially reluctant to take on the project, observers hailed the casting of a trans woman in such a campaign as a sign of progress. Towards the end of the year Harisu appeared in Yonfan's Colour Blossoms, an erotic drama film from Hong Kong in which she shared a role with veteran Japanese actress Keiko Matsuzaka. Released on October 18, 2004, it was poorly received at the box office and by the media, though it had some success at film festivals, and picked up several awards and nominations.

Harisu made a return to Korean screens in early 2005, after being cast in the MBC miniseries Beating Heart, her first major role in a Korean drama. She starred in several episodes as a transgender woman, returning to her family after a lengthy absence in a bid to gain acceptance. Later that year her Foxy Lady album was released in Taiwan and China with the inclusion of songs re-recorded in Mandarin, and she was even promoted by her Taiwanese record label as the "Kylie Minogue of the East". In September 2005, Harisu gained a foothold in Malaysia after signing a three-year memorandum of understanding with Hock Star Entertainment, a deal which included the production of two feature films and secured the Malaysian release of her album.

=== 2006–present ===
After a prolonged absence from the Korean music scene, Harisu returned in January 2006 with her fourth, self-titled album. Although her comeback was originally scheduled for the summer of 2005, this had been prevented by other commitments overseas. The album was preceded by a digital single, "Winter Story",^{[d]} and marked a change in her image, with an emphasis on being "cute" rather than "sexy". Harisu charted at number 46 in Korea, and as with her previous album it was released in Taiwan and China with extra songs recorded in Mandarin. Her fifth Korean album, Summer, was released just six months later, though it failed to chart in the top 50.

Her next film—the first as part of the deal with Hock Star Entertainment—was Possessed, a Malaysian horror film released on November 30, 2006, in which she starred alongside Amber Chia. Harisu played Lisu, a murdered pop singer who becomes a vengeful ghost, and also performed the films theme song, though it was necessary for her dialogue to be spoken in Korean and later dubbed. She was praised by director Bjarne Wong for her hard work and professionalism, and has hinted that they may collaborate on another film in the future.

In early 2007, Harisu was cast as the lead actress in Police Line, a Korean drama series produced for cable network On-Media. The series, based around a special unit for victims of sexual abuse, starred Harisu as a policewoman who was molested as a child by her stepfather. Filming for Police Line began in April 2007, and the series was launched in June with Harisu's husband Micky Jung making a cameo appearance. In December 2007, Harisu released a digital mini-album, Winter Special, which featured a duet with her husband on the track "First Snow".

Harisu published a collection of essays in Japan in March 2008, titled Haris Beauty (sic). The essays formed a comprehensive guide to beauty, diet and fashion, and contained photographs of Harisu taken by Yamagishi Shin, who had traveled to Seoul the previous December for a four-day photo shoot. Harisu also provided narration for the visually impaired for the 2008 film If You Were Me: Anima Version 2, an animated film about human rights.

As of 2008, Harisu believed that she still faced discrimination within the entertainment industry, saying on television, "Many people pretend to smile and welcome me, but after the filming, they'd scold me behind my back".

== Personal life ==
Harisu's decision to undergo sex reassignment surgery placed a strain on her relationship with her family, and she noted that when her parents first found out they "were very upset. They weren't angry, but very sad."^{[e]} Her father in particular had great difficulty accepting his child as a daughter, but her family have since accepted this and show great pride in her career.

Harisu has been given credit for raising social awareness of transgender people in the Republic of Korea, and has said in interviews that she hopes to be a role model for other trans people. In April 2007, she came to the aid of a Chinese trans woman unable to afford surgery, giving her the financial support needed to undergo this costly procedure. Affected by the 2008 suicides of gay actor Kim Ji-hoo and transgender television personality Jang Chae-won, Harisu opened a transgender club "Mix-Trans" in Apgujeong-dong, southern Seoul, in June 2009.

=== Legal recognition of gender ===
On November 29, 2002, Harisu filed a petition with the Incheon District Court to have her sex corrected on her family register, and that her birth name be changed to Lee Kyung-eun. The subsequent court ruling went in her favour, and on December 13, 2002, she became the second person in the Republic of Korea to legally change their sex. Speaking of the difficulties she had previously encountered, Harisu has said: "My most embarrassing moments were when I have had to show my personal identification card in public... I couldn't get a passport, visa or even my own bank accounts because I was legally a man".

=== Marriage ===
Since her debut in 2001, Harisu has consistently expressed a desire to marry and have a family of her own. In 2005, she began dating Micky Jung (real name Jung Yong-jin), a rapper whom she had met online. Jung, who had been a member of dance group EQ during the 1990s, later joined Harisu's management company and worked on her fourth and fifth albums. The couple briefly separated in 2006, but were reunited after Jung saw her dating another man on a TV show. Rumours that the two were to marry began circulating in November 2006, and a date for the wedding was announced in February, following meetings between their respective families. Harisu and Jung starred in a reality television show on cable network Mnet showing their everyday lives and preparations for their wedding, but the couple were subjected to harsh criticism from netizens.

On May 19, 2007, Harisu and Jung were married at Central City Millennium Hall in the Seocho District of Seoul. The ceremony was presided over by KBS anchor Shin Young-il, and officiated by Kim Seok-Kwun, a Dong-A University professor who had performed Harisu's sex change surgery in the 1990s. The couple honeymooned on the Thai island of Ko Samui, and began their married life at Harisu's family home in Nonhyun-dong, in the Gangnam District of Seoul. The couple have said that they plan to adopt four children, though the news prompted a mixed public reaction. A poll by Mnet found that 69% of 1,300 respondents were in favour of Harisu's decision to adopt, while in a similar poll by Daum, 58% of 8,094 respondents were against the idea. Harisu and Jung divorced in 2017 after ten years of marriage.

=== Welfare and politics ===
In November 2007, Harisu unveiled plans to build and run an orphanage, stating that it was one of her "long-cherished dreams". With the support of her husband and mother-in-law, she purchased a 3,300 m^{2} (3,900 sq yd) plot of land in Janghowon, Gyeonggi Province, and studied for a community service license. Harisu campaigned for the New Progressive Party in the 2008 Republic of Korea legislative elections, supporting the legalization of marijuana.

== Discography ==
As of 2007, Harisu has released five Korean language studio albums, though her song lyrics typically include English as well. While her early work has been described as "techno-flavored K-pop", her more recent albums have leaned towards the R&B, hip-hop, and disco genres. She has named Madonna and Janet Jackson as her musical influences; of her contemporaries, she holds Chae Rina in high esteem.

=== Studio albums ===
Title	Release date	Chart position	Sales	Notes
Temptation	September 22, 2001	32	25,474 (as of October 2001)	Also released in Taiwan.
Liar	October 28, 2002	23	15,760 (as of October 2002)	
Foxy Lady	February 2, 2004	—	—	Released in Taiwan, China and Malaysia in 2005, with extra tracks recorded in Mandarin.
Harisu	January 24, 2006	46	1,596 (as of January 2006)	Also released in Taiwan and China, with extra tracks recorded in Mandarin.
Summer	July 25, 2006	—	—	

=== Other releases ===
Title	Release date	Notes
Yellow Hair 2 OST	July 23, 2001	Film soundtrack by various artists; includes two songs by Harisu, "Paradise" and "Sad Love".
The First Live Concert	July 29, 2002	Live concert, released on VHS and VCD.
Dance Fever #01	June 12, 2003	Compilation by various artists; includes Harisu's version of "The Cheeky Song", originally recorded by The Cheeky Girls.
"Winter Story"	December 5, 2005	Digital single, taken from the album Harisu.
Winter Special	December 6, 2007	Five track digital mini-album; includes a Korean language version of "Santa Claus Is Coming to Town".

=== Compilation albums ===
The Queen/11th Anniversary(2012)

=== Single albums ===
Re:Su(2018)

=== Music videos ===
- "History" by Turbo (2001)
- "Temptation" (2001)
- "Always" by Kang Sung (2002)
- "Liar" (2002)
- "Foxy Lady" (2004)
- "Reaction" (2006)
- "Shopping Girl" (2012)
- "Make Your Life" (2018)

== Filmography ==
Year	Title	Role	Notes
2001	Yellow Hair 2	J	Also performed two songs on the soundtrack.
2002	City Horror Series (TV)	General Bai Lan	Appeared in "The Song of the Dead".
2002	Emergency Act 19	Herself	Brief cameo appearance.
2004	Hi! Honey (TV)	Lu Jia Ling	
2004	Colour Blossoms	Madam Umeki	
2004	Free As Love		
2005	Beating Heart (TV)	Kim Hae-jung	Appeared in episodes 3, 4, 9 and 12.
2006	Possessed	Lisu	Also sang the films main theme song.
2007	Police Line (TV)		
2009	The Return of Iljimae (TV)	Ki Seon-nyeo	

== Bibliography ==
- Eve from Adam (2001) Dai San Media, ISBN 89-372-0868-7
- Beauty Goddess's Change (2002) Taiwan Kadokawa, ISBN 986-7993-33-0
- Perfect Woman (2005) Bo Shi, ISBN 986-7224-80-9
- Haris Beauty (2008) Takeshobo, ISBN 978-4-8124-3425-3

== Awards and nominations ==
Year	Award-Giving Body	Category	Work	Result
2001	Mnet Asian Music Awards	Best New Female Artist	"Temptation"	Nominated
2002	Mnet Asian Music Awards	Best Dance Performance	"Liar"	Nominated

== See also ==
- LGBTQ rights in South Korea
- Lady (group)
- Lee Si-yeon
- Hong Seok-cheon

== Notes ==
- a. Although the cited source states that Harisu has an older brother, other sources refer to her as being an "only child".
- b. The exact dates that Harisu underwent surgery are unclear. Some sources state that she had sex change surgery in 1995, while others give the year as 1998 (or when she was 23 years old).
- c. Harisu is sometimes written as Ha Ri-su, Ha Ri-soo, or Ha Risu.
- d. The actual title for this song is in Korean. Alternative translations include "When it Snows" and "Falling Snow".
- e. In a more recent interview, Harisu seems to contradict herself by saying that "There wasn't any reaction at all" from her family.
