= Innocent Steps =

- Hangul: 댄서의 순정
- Hanja: 댄서의 純情
- RR: Daenseoui sunjeong
- MR: Taensŏŭi sunjŏng
- Directed by: Park Young-hoon
- Written by: Park Gye-ok
- Produced by: Choi Sun-sik; Heo Jae-cheol; Lee Jae-hyeok; Shin Jae-hyeon
- Starring: Moon Geun-young; Park Gun-hyung
- Cinematography: Kim Jong-yun
- Edited by: Shin Min-kyung
- Music by: Choi Man-sik
- Distributed by: Show East
- Release date: 28 April 2005
- Running time: 110 minutes
- Country: South Korea
- Languages: Korean; Mandarin
- Box office: US$13,195,678

Innocent Steps (Korean: 댄서의 순정; RR: Daenseoui sunjeong; lit. 'Dancer's Purity') is a 2005 South Korean comedy drama film directed by Park Young-hoon. Another English title for the movie is "Dancing princess".

There's a director's cut version of the movie featuring additional 17 minutes of footage and alternative cut of the dance scene at competition.

== Plot ==
Former acclaimed dancer Na Young-sae (Park Gun-hyung) attempts to make a comeback after his opponent, Hyun-soo (Yoon Chan), purposely injures him at a dance competition. At the suggestion of dance studio manager Ma Sang-doo (Park Won-sang), Young-sae then brings to Korea Jang Chae-ryn (Moon Geun-young), an ethnic Korean from China whom he presumes is a renowned, talented dancer. To his surprise, Young-sae learns Chae-ryn knows nothing about dancing and her soon-to-be married, older sister, Jang Chae-min, is the talented dancer. With only three months until the national dance championship, Young-sae trains Chae-ryn, vowing to turn her into a world-class dancer.

== Cast ==
- Moon Geun-young as Jang Chae-min
- Park Gun-hyung as Na Young-sae
- Park Won-sang as Ma Sang-doo
- Yoon Chan as Jung Hyun-soo

== Awards and nominations ==
2005 Grand Bell Awards

- Nomination – Best Actress – Moon Geun-young
- Nomination – Best New Actor – Park Gun-hyung
- Nomination – Best Costume Design – Lee Ji-young

2005 Blue Dragon Film Awards

- Nomination – Best New Actor – Park Gun-hyung

2005 Korean Film Awards

- Best New Actor – Park Gun-hyung

== Critical reception ==
The film received mixed to negative reviews. Variety reviewer, Derek Elley favorably compared the film to Dance with the Wind, citing Moon Geun-young and Park Gun-hyung's performances, but wrote "the plot holds no water." Koreanfilm.org critic Tom Giammarco called the film "disappointing and cliche," and Darcy Paquet credited the film's box office success to Moon's celebrity status and noted that the ending was disappointing: "We never even really get to see the knock-em-dead dance sequence that you'd expect."

== Remake ==
In 2015, Culture Cap Korea announced that it will co-produce a Chinese remake, which will cast a Chinese actor and a Korean actress. 60% of filming will take place in China, and 40% in Busan.
