= Pace Wu =

Taiwanese model, actress, and singer

- Born: 4 October 1978 (age 48); Taiwan
- Occupations: Model; actress; singer

Chinese name
- Traditional Chinese: 吳佩慈
- Simplified Chinese: 吴佩慈
Transcriptions
Standard Mandarin
- Hanyu Pinyin: Wú Pèicí
- Musical career
- Origin: Taiwan
- Label: Huayi Brothers

Pace Wu (Chinese: 吳佩慈; pinyin: Wú Pèicí; born 4 October 1978) is a Taiwanese former model, actress, and singer.

== Biography ==
After transferring to Taipei Hwa Kang Arts School, Wu befriended classmates Barbie Hsu, Dee Hsu, and Aya Liu. She made her debut in 1998 as a member of the girl group “Girl Specimens,” along with Yuki Hsu, Angelica Lee, and Cheer Chen, under Rock Records, releasing one compilation album before disbanding. She then pursued a solo career spanning advertising, film, television, music, and hosting.

Wu has 4 kids with her boyfriend, Ji Xiaobo, the son of Cui Lijie. Following the birth of her first child in 2014, she largely retired from the entertainment industry. In 2023, Ji became a fugitive, reportedly hiding in Japan after being declared a “mafia kingpin” by the Chinese government. Following this, Wu divided her time between Japan, Hong Kong, and Taiwan.

== Filmography ==
=== Film ===
Year	English title	Chinese Title	Role
2000	A War Named Desire	愛與誠	Jess
2001	United We Stand and Swim	4*100水著份子	Audrey
2004	Photo Album of the Village	村之寫真集	Rin
2005	Into the Sun	烈日血戰	Mai Ling
2006	Undercover Hidden Dragon	至尊無賴	Yen Shu-hsien
2006	Marriage with a Fool	獨家試愛	Josephine
2009	Tracing Shadow	追影	Ming Yue Xin
2009	Panda Express	熊猫大侠	Er Mazi's wife
2010	Go Lala Go!	杜拉拉升职记	Helen
2010	Preliminary Trial	预审	Jia Ying
2010	The Perfect Match	終極匹配	
2010	Reign of Assassins	劍雨	Qing Jian
2010	Lost in Panic Room	密室之不可告人	Zhang Hui
2013	A Wedding Invitation	分手合约	Zhou Rei
2013	Thrilling Eve	夜幕惊魂	
2013	One Night Surprise	一夜惊喜	Weiwei

=== Television ===
Year	Title	English title	Role
2002	流星花園 II	Meteor Garden II	Ying Xiao Qiao
2004	嗨！親爱的	Hi! Honey	Xu Tian Zhen
2007	食神	God of Cookery	
2009	協奏曲	The Concerto	Yuan Zhe

== Discography ==
=== Albums ===
- 1998: All My Pace
- 2005: Look at Me
- 2008: Glittering Night Course
