= Colour Blossoms =

2004 Hong Kong film by Yonfan

- Directed by: Yonfan
- Written by: Yonfan
- Produced by: Fruit Chan; Yonfan
- Starring: Teresa Cheung; Keiko Matsuzaka; Harisu; Carl Ng; Sho Yokouchi
- Cinematography: Wang Yu
- Music by: Surender Sodhi
- Distributed by: Far Sun Film Co.
- Release date: 28 October 2004
- Running time: 106 minutes
- Country: Hong Kong
- Languages: Cantonese; English; Japanese
- Budget: HK$10 million

Colour Blossoms (Chinese: 桃色; Jyutping: Toh sik) is a 2004 Hong Kong art film written and directed by Yonfan, and the third in an informal trilogy of films inspired by Tang Xianzu's The Peony Pavilion. The original Chinese title of Colour Blossoms literally translates as "Peach Colour", a euphemism for sexual desire, one of the central themes in the film.

== Production ==
Yonfan began writing the script for Colour Blossoms in Venice, following the screening of his previous film, Breaking the Willow, at the Venice Film Festival. He had all three lead actresses in mind from the outset, in particular longtime friend Teresa Cheung for the part of Meili. Despite being a Hong Kong production, the cast and crew of the film came from a number of Asian countries, with actors from Japan (Matsuzaka and Yokouchi) and Korea (Harisu), and a filmmaking crew from mainland China, led by cinematographer Wang Yu. For the film's score Yonfan travelled personally to India to find a local composer, eventually hiring the talents of Surender Sodhi, a veteran of the Indian film industry.

Although Colour Blossoms had initially been planned as a low budget production, the actual cost ran to HK$10 million. It was largely funded by Yonfan himself, but financing problems resulted in an extended filming period of 13 months. The film had difficulty attracting potential investors due to its risqué subject matter, and a number of local actors had also been dissuaded from participating by their agents.

== Main cast ==
- Teresa Cheung as Meili. Yonfan has stated that Cheung was his inspiration for the film, although the character was not directly based on her personality. A first time actress, Cheung was initially reluctant to perform the nude and sexual scenes, but has defended the film's artistic qualities.
- Keiko Matsuzaka as Madam Umeki. Regarded by Yonfan as one of his cinematic idols, Matsuzaka has said that Colour Blossoms was her most demanding film.
- Harisu as young Madam Umeki.
- Carl Ng as 4708. Ng was originally approached to play the role of Kim, but after reading the script "fell in love with the cop 4708". The character has no dialogue in the film, instead relying on gestures and movement, something Ng recognised as a challenge.
- Sho Yokouchi as Kim. A former male model with no previous acting experience, Yokouchi had great difficulty with the film, admitting that he "just couldn't grasp the meaning." As a result, he has since stated that he will never make another film, believing he is not suited to the work. Credited in the film as Sho.

== Reception ==
Prior to its release, Colour Blossoms received strong criticism from the Hong Kong media for its strong sexual themes and the involvement of lead actress Teresa Cheung, herself a controversial figure. It premiered in Hong Kong on 27 October 2004, and opened to the public the following day. During its opening weekend it was the second highest-grossing film in Hong Kong, but total box office earnings of HK$4,584,092 failed to recoup the film's budget. Colour Blossoms also received a cinema release in both Singapore and Japan, and was screened at a number of film festivals worldwide, including Berlinale, Cinemanila, and the Chicago International Film Festival.

In 2011, the film was screened at the 16th Busan International Film Festival, as part of a retrospective of Yonfan's films, which featured seven of his restored and re-mastered films from the 1980s through 2000s.

=== Critical response ===
The film has received a very mixed response from critics. In a particularly scathing review for Firecracker magazine, Alison Wong dismissed Colour Blossoms as "a sexual melting pot that is all style, little substance and virtually no chemistry", describing the S&M scenes as "almost laughable", and going on to say "that for all its lofty aspirations, the film has no driving purpose beyond attempting to titillate." Another critic wrote that the film is "incredibly dense, emotionally cold, and moves at a glacial pace", and that "Everything looks and sounds absolutely stunning [but] it just doesn't make any sense." Other negative reviews have nevertheless also praised the films visual aspects: Carl Davis at DVD Talk stated "There is no arguing that Colour Blossoms is a gorgeous looking movie", but that the director ultimately "gives us style over substance." A review at Fridae.com called the film "an undeniable feast for the eyes", but added that it "also veers dangerously into campy excess and plain old weirdness" while criticising the "weak and unconvincing" characters and plot. However, some critics have defended the film's artistic merit. In a review for DVDActive, Bodhi Sarkar described the film as "a profoundly mesmerising journey of human sensuality and spirituality", going on to add that the "poetic camerawork, luminous cinematography and Surender Sodhi's tranquilising soundtrack help create an enjoyable and thought provoking visual treat".

=== Awards and nominations ===
Colour Blossoms has both won, and been nominated for, a number of awards.

It has won the following accolades:

Year	Award	Category – Recipient(s)
2005	Hong Kong Film Critics Society Awards	Film of Merit
2005	7th Cinemanila International Film Festival Awards	Tribute – Yonfan
2005	7th Cinemanila International Film Festival Awards	Rising Star Award – Teresa Cheung
2005	2nd Chennai International Film Festival Awards	Most Promising Actress – Teresa Cheung

It has also been nominated for the following awards:

- 25th Hong Kong Film Awards (2005)
  - Best New Performer – Teresa Cheung
  - Best Art Direction – Man Lim Chung
  - Best Costume & Make Up Design – Yonfan, Ho Tsz Leung
  - Best Original Film Score – Surender Sodhi
- Hong Kong Film Critics Society Awards (2005)
  - Best Actress – Teresa Cheung
