= List of South Korean films of 1999 =

A list of films produced in South Korea in 1999:

Title	Director	Cast	Genre	Notes
1999
Attack the Gas Station	Kim Sang-jin	Lee Sung-jae; Yu Oh-seong; Kang Sung-jin; Yoo Ji-tae		
L'Amour	Lee Doo-yong			
The Bird Who Stops in the Air	Jeon Soo-il			
Black Hole	Kim Kuk-hyung			
Black Honeymoon	Na Hong-kyun			
Calla	Song Hae-sung	Song Seung-heon; Kim Hee-sun		
City of the Rising Sun	Kim Sung-su	Jung Woo-sung; Lee Jung-jae		
The Cut Runs Deep	John H. Lee			
Dance Dance	Moon Seong-wook			
Dr. K	Kwak Kyung-taek			
Fin de Siècle	Song Neung-han			
Fly Low	Kim Sion			
Ghost in Love	Lee Kwang-hoon	Lee Sung-jae; Kim Hee-sun		
The Great Chef	Kim Ui-seok			
Gojitmal	Jang Sun-wu	Lee Sang-hyun; Kim Tae-yeon		
The Harmonium in My Memory	Lee Young-jae			
Happy End	Jung Ji-woo	Choi Min-sik; Jeon Do-yeon		
Love	Lee Jang-soo	Jung Woo-sung; Ko So-young		
Love Wind Love Song	Park Dae-young			
Mayonnaisee	Yoon In-ho			
Memento Mori	Min Kyu-dong; Kim Tae-yong	Lee Young-jin; Park Ye-jin		
My Heart	Bae Chang-ho			
Mystery of the Cube	Jonathan You			
Nowhere to Hide	Myung Se-Lee	Park Joong-hoon; Ahn Sung-ki		
The Opening	Kim Sung-hong			
Peppermint Candy	Lee Chang-dong	Sul Kyung-gu		
Phantom, the Submarine	Min Byung-chun	Choi Min-soo; Jung Woo-sung		
Rainbow Trout	Park Chong-won			
Reptilian	Shim Hyung-rae	Dan Cashman	Kaiju	
The Ring Virus	Kim Dong-bin	Shin Eun-kyung; Lee Seung-hyun; Jung Jin-young		
Rush	Lee Sang-in			
Shiri	Kang Je-gyu	Han Suk-kyu; Choi Min-sik; Song Kang-ho		
The Spy	Jang Jin			
A Sudden Crash of Thunder	Lee Ji-sang			
Tell Me Something	Chang Yoon-hyun	Han Suk-kyu; Shim Eun-ha		
The Uprising	Park Kwang-su	Lee Jung-jae; Shim Eun-ha		
White Valentine	Yang Yun-ho	Park Shin-yang; Jun Ji-hyun		
Yellow Hair	Kim Yu-min	Lee Jae-eun; Kim Ki-yeon; Kim Hyeon-cheol	Drama	
Yonggary	Shim Hyung-rae			
