= Liar (Harisu album) =

Studio album by Harisu
- Released: October 28, 2002
- Genre: K-Pop
- Length: 47:03
- Language: Korean, English
- Label: EnterOne Music/Neowiz Bugs
- Producer: Scott Shin

Harisu chronology
Temptation (2001)	Liar (2002)	Foxy Lady (2004)

Liar is the second studio album by South Korean entertainer Harisu, released on October 28, 2002. Musically similar to her first album, Temptation, Harisu describes Liar as being "very Euro/techno/house... a high-energy dance record with a very upbeat rhythm." A music video was filmed for the album's title track.

Liar peaked at #23 on the MIAK K-pop albums chart, selling 15,760 copies in its first month of release.

== Track listing ==
1. "Prologue" – 1:23
2. "Asura" – 3:09
3. "Angel Eyes" – 3:55
4. "Liar" – 3:33
5. "Chapter" – 0:28
6. "Emotion" – 3:54
7. "Red" – 3:49
8. "Go Away" – 3:58
9. "Chapter" – 0:34
10. "Ending" – 3:43
11. "Happy My Life" – 3:54
12. "Catch Me" – 3:44
13. "Trust of My Heart" – 3:55
14. "Asura" (remix) – 3:09
15. "Happy My Life" (remix) – 3:48
