= Park Gun-hyung =

South Korean actor

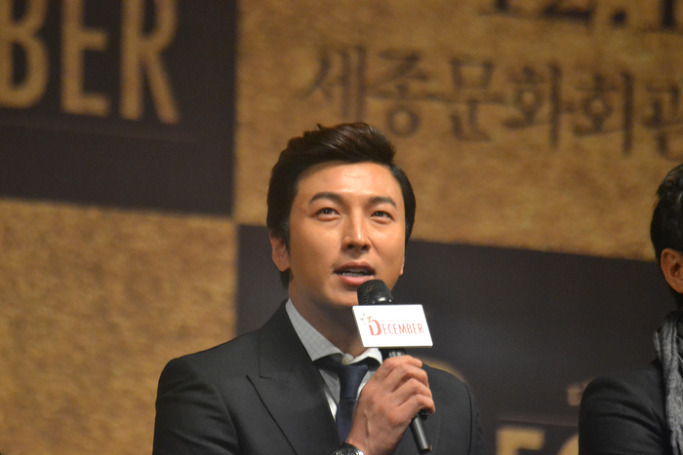
- Park in 2013
- Born: November 1, 1977 (age 48); Seoul, South Korea
- Education: Seoul Institute of the Arts - Theater
- Occupation: Actor
- Years active: 2001–present
- Agent(s): Namoo Actors (2004–2017)
- Spouse: Lee Chae-rim (m. 2014)
- Children: 1 son

Korean name
- Hangul: 박건형
- Hanja: 朴健衡
- RR: Bak Geonhyeong
- MR: Pak Kŏnhyŏng

Park Gun-hyung (Korean: 박건형; born November 1, 1977) is a South Korean actor. Park made his acting debut in musical theatre in 2001 and has since been active on both television and stage. He starred in the ballroom dancing film Innocent Steps (2005), the period drama The Kingdom of the Winds (2008), as well as played doctors in medical drama Syndrome, and romantic comedy I Do, I Do (2012).

== Filmography ==
=== Film ===
Year	Title	Role
2004	DMZ	Sgt Lee Min-ki
2005	Innocent Steps	Lee Young-sae
2006	Mr. Wacky	Woo Joo-ho
2006	Three Fellas	Park Jung-kwon
2011	Smile Bus (short film)	Sang-ho
2014	The Royal Tailor	special appearance

=== Television ===
Year	Title	Role	Network
2004	Ms. Kim's Million Dollar Quest	Yoo Young-hun	SBS
2007	When Spring Comes	Lee Jung-do	KBS2
2008	The Kingdom of the Winds	Do Jin	KBS2
2012	Syndrome	Kang Eun-hyun	jTBC
2012	I Do, I Do	Jo Eun-sung	MBC
2013	Goddess of Fire	Lee Yuk-do	MBC
2016	Working Mom Parenting Daddy	Kim Jae-min	MBC

=== Variety show ===
Year	Title	Network	Notes/Ref.
2014	Real Men	MBC	Main cast
2017	The Return of Superman	KBS2	Ep 185–186
2021	Wild Cave	tvN STORY	Cast Member

== Theater ==
- Something Rotten (2020)
- Taxi Driver (2015)
- December (2013–2014)
- The Scarlet Pimpernel (2013)
- Hedwig and the Angry Inch (2012)
- Zorro (2011–2012)
- The Sorrows of Young Werther (2010)
- Mozart! (2010)
- Fool for Love (2010)
- The Wedding Singer (2009–2010)
- The Three Musketeers (2009)
- I Am Sam (2008)
- Hamlet: The Rock Opera (2008–2009)
- The Beautiful Game (2007–2008)
- Go! Go! Beach (2004)
- Saturday Night Fever (2003–2004)
- Singin' in the Rain (2002–2003)
- The Rehearsal (2002)
- The Play (2001)

== Awards and nominations ==
Year presented, name of the award ceremony, category, nominated work and the result of the nomination
Year	Award	Category	Nominated work	Result
2004	10th Korea Musical Awards	Best New Actor	Saturday Night Fever	Won
2005	4th Korean Film Awards	Best New Actor	Innocent Steps	Won
2005	26th Blue Dragon Film Awards	Best New Actor	Innocent Steps	Nominated
2005	42nd Grand Bell Awards	Best New Actor	Innocent Steps	Nominated
2007	43rd Baeksang Arts Awards	Best New Actor (TV)	When Spring Comes	Nominated
2007	KBS Drama Awards	Best New Actor	When Spring Comes	Nominated
2008	KBS Drama Awards	Netizen Award, Actor	The Kingdom of the Winds	Nominated
2008	KBS Drama Awards	Best Couple Award with Choi Jung-won	The Kingdom of the Winds	Nominated
2009	5th Golden Ticket Awards	Best Musical Actor		Won
2014	MBC Entertainment Awards	Excellence Award in a Variety Show	Real Men	Won
2016	MBC Drama Awards	Top Excellence Award, Actor in a Serial Drama	Working Mom Parenting Daddy	Nominated
