= Yoon Chan (actor, born 1972) =

South Korean actor

- Born: January 3, 1972 (age 54); Seoul, South Korea
- Education: Dankook University - Theater and Film
- Occupation: Actor
- Years active: 2001–present

Korean name
- Hangul: 윤찬
- RR: Yun Chan
- MR: Yun Ch'an

Yoon Chan (born January 3, 1972) is a South Korean actor. He played supporting roles in the films Yellow Hair 2 (2001), Natural City (2003), Hypnotized (2004) and Innocent Steps (2005).

== Filmography ==
=== Film ===
Year	Title	Role
2001	Friend	Dong-su's subordinate
2001	Yellow Hair 2	M
2003	Natural City	Noma
2004	Hypnotized	Min-seok
2005	Innocent Steps	Jung Hyun-soo

=== Television series ===
Year	Title	Role
2009	Primitive Family: Tutta Family	Ppabu

=== Music video appearances ===
Year	Song title	Artist
1997	"21C Monolith"	015B
2001	"With Coffee"	Brown Eyes
2005	"Confession (Go Back)"	Dynamic Duo

== Musical theatre ==
Year	Title	Role
1995-2000	The Last Empress	Chorus
