= Working Mom Parenting Daddy =

2016 South Korean television series

- Promotional poster
- Genre: Family drama Slice of life Comedy
- Created by: Park Sung-eun
- Written by: Lee Sook-jin
- Directed by: Choi Yi-seop; Park Won-gook
- Starring: Hong Eun-hee; Park Gun-hyung; Oh Jung-yeon; Han Ji-sang; Shin Eun-jung; Gong Jung-hwan
- Country of origin: South Korea
- No. of episodes: 120

Production
- Executive producers: Kim Dong-gu; Yoon Yong
- Running time: 35 minutes
- Production company: DK E&M

Original release
- Network: MBC
- Release: May 9 – November 11, 2016

Working Mom Parenting Daddy (Korean: 워킹 맘 육아 대디) is a 2016 South Korean television series starring Hong Eun-hee, Park Gun-hyung, Oh Jung-yeon, Han Ji-sang, Shin Eun-jung and Gong Jung-hwan. It aired on MBC every Mondays to Fridays at 20:55 (KST) for 120 episodes from May 9 to November 11, 2016.

== Cast ==
=== Main cast ===
- Hong Eun-hee as Lee Mi-so
- Park Gun-hyung as Kim Jae-min
- Oh Jung-yeon as Joo Ye-eun
- Han Ji-sang as Cha Il-mok
- Shin Eun-jung as Yoon Jeong-hyun
- Gong Jung-hwan as Park Hyuk-gi

=== People around Lee Mi-so ===
- Goo Geon-min as Kim Bang-geul
- Gil Hae-yeon as Lee Hae-soon

=== People around Joo Ye-eun ===
- Go Seung-bo as Cha Min-ho
- Lee Kyung-jin as Ok Soo-ran
  - Kim Ha-rin as young Soo-ran

=== People around Yoon Jeong-hyun ===
- Go Na-hee as Park Eun-sol

=== Ritz Electronic ===
- Son Geon-woo as Oh Sang-sik
- Kim Kyung-nam as Park Jin-sung
- Choi Sung-min as Yoo Han-moo
- Kim Yong-woon as Kim Heung-bok
- Lee Jeong-hoon as Kwon Jeong-hoon (Human Resource Management team's vice-chief)
- Baek Min as Go Jin-ho (Head of Disciplinary Committee)
- N/A as Deputy Choi

=== Extended cast ===
- Jung Myung-joon as Park Hyuk-gi's friend
- Lee Yeon-seon as Yoo-ra's mother
- N/A as Chan-ho's mother
- Yang So-min
- Kim Bibi
- Han Young-kwang
- Kwon Young-kyung
- Choi Moon-jeong
- Gook Jeong-sook
- Kim Hyun
- Choi Min-geum
- Kim Mi-rim
- Park Gi-hoon
- Baek Min
- Yeo Woon-bok

=== Cameo appearances ===
- Yoo Jun-sang as Lee Moon-han

== Ratings ==
In the table below, the blue numbers represent the lowest ratings and the red numbers represent the highest ratings.

Episode #	Original broadcast date	Average audience share			
Episode #	Original broadcast date	TNmS Ratings		AGB Nielsen Ratings	
Episode #	Original broadcast date	Nationwide	Seoul National Capital Area	Nationwide	Seoul National Capital Area
1	May 9, 2016	8.8%	8.8%	9.1%	9.8%
2	May 10, 2016	8.1%	7.9%	10.0%	10.6%
3	May 11, 2016	9.6%	9.0%	9.0%	9.4%
4	May 12, 2016	8.2%	8.3%	8.3%	9.2%
5	May 13, 2016	7.4%	7.3%	6.8%	7.8%
6	May 16, 2016	8.2%	8.7%	8.3%	8.8%
7	May 17, 2016	9.2%	9.4%	8.6%	8.6%
8	May 18, 2016	8.7%	8.9%	8.1%	8.6%
9	May 19, 2016	7.6%	8.1%	7.4%	8.1%
10	May 20, 2016	7.0%	6.9%	7.8%	8.4%
11	May 23, 2016	9.0%	9.0%	8.9%	9.3%
12	May 24, 2016	8.0%	8.1%	8.8%	9.2%
13	May 25, 2016	8.6%	9.1%	9.5%	10.3%
14	May 26, 2016	7.3%	7.5%	8.6%	9.3%
15	May 27, 2016	7.0%	6.8%	7.9%	8.0%
16	May 30, 2016	9.2%	8.6%	9.7%	10.8%
17	May 31, 2016	7.9%	7.9%	8.5%	9.7%
18	June 1, 2016	8.5%	8.7%	8.8%	9.1%
19	June 2, 2016	8.4%	8.1%	9.5%	11.1%
20	June 3, 2016	7.7%	6.4%	7.3%	7.7%
21	June 6, 2016	9.1%	9.5%	9.2%	9.9%
22	June 7, 2016	8.4%	8.7%	9.0%	10.2%
23	June 8, 2016	8.8%	8.7%	8.9%	9.2%
24	June 9, 2016	8.5%	8.4%	9.2%	10.0%
25	June 10, 2016	7.4%	7.3%	7.6%	7.8%
26	June 13, 2016	9.2%	9.6%	10.4%	11.3%
27	June 14, 2016	8.8%	9.7%	9.8%	10.8%
28	June 15, 2016	9.7%	9.0%	10.5%	11.6%
29	June 16, 2016	8.0%	8.0%	9.5%	10.4%
30	June 17, 2016	7.6%	7.0%	8.2%	8.7%
31	June 20, 2016	9.0%	9.3%	10.0%	10.6%
32	June 21, 2016	9.2%	10.6%	9.3%	10.0%
33	June 22, 2016	9.4%	8.8%	9.8%	10.6%
34	June 23, 2016	8.2%	8.2%	8.3%	9.7%
35	June 24, 2016	8.2%	7.8%	7.6%	8.0%
36	June 27, 2016	9.4%	8.6%	9.7%	11.2%
37	June 28, 2016	8.9%	9.3%	10.6%	12.1%
38	June 29, 2016	8.6%	7.9%	9.2%	10.2%
39	June 30, 2016	8.9%	8.7%	9.3%	10.0%
40	July 1, 2016	8.6%	9.1%	8.4%	8.8%
41	July 4, 2016	9.9%	9.7%	10.5%	11.6%
42	July 5, 2016	9.8%	10.0%	10.5%	12.4%
43	July 6, 2016	9.3%	9.6%	9.7%	10.6%
44	July 7, 2016	9.4%	9.2%	9.4%	10.1%
45	July 8, 2016	9.2%	9.3%	8.1%	9.0%
46	July 11, 2016	10.6%	10.5%	10.5%	11.6%
47	July 12, 2016	9.6%	9.1%	9.7%	11.2%
48	July 13, 2016	10.3%	9.2%	10.1%	10.9%
49	July 14, 2016	9.6%	10.0%	9.6%	10.5%
50	July 15, 2016	8.2%	7.4%	8.6%	9.5%
51	July 18, 2016	10.8%	10.7%	10.1%	11.1%
52	July 19, 2016	9.8%	10.1%	9.7%	10.7%
53	July 20, 2016	9.9%	10.0%	9.5%	9.9%
54	July 21, 2016	9.0%	9.3%	10.0%	11.0%
55	July 22, 2016	8.5%	7.0%	8.1%	8.9%
56	July 25, 2016	11.3%	11.7%	10.2%	10.6%
57	July 26, 2016	10.8%	10.6%	9.5%	10.2%
58	July 27, 2016	10.9%	11.2%	10.7%	11.9%
59	July 28, 2016	10.5%	9.9%	9.8%	10.8%
60	July 29, 2016	9.0%	9.3%	8.7%	9.2%
61	August 1, 2016	11.1%	11.9%	10.3%	11.2%
62	August 2, 2016	11.0%	10.7%	10.3%	10.8%
63	August 3, 2016	10.3%	10.4%	8.6%	8.8%
64	August 4, 2016	10.2%	9.9%	9.7%	10.5%
65	August 5, 2016	9.4%	9.6%	8.5%	8.7%
66	August 8, 2016	10.7%	10.1%	10.2%	10.4%
67	August 9, 2016	11.7%	12.3%	9.4%	9.4%
68	August 10, 2016	11.2%	11.7%	9.9%	10.4%
69	August 22, 2016	10.4%	10.2%	9.1%	9.5%
70	August 23, 2016	10.3%	10.5%	10.1%	10.8%
71	August 24, 2016	11.2%	10.4%	9.9%	10.7%
72	August 25, 2016	9.8%	9.6%	10.3%	11.4%
73	August 26, 2016	9.4%	9.0%	8.6%	9.0%
74	August 29, 2016	10.4%	10.6%	10.7%	11.8%
75	August 30, 2016	10.0%	9.6%	10.5%	11.2%
76	August 31, 2016	11.4%	12.2%	9.5%	9.9%
77	September 1, 2016	10.0%	9.6%	8.8%	9.1%
78	September 2, 2016	9.9%	9.6%	8.7%	8.9%
79	September 5, 2016	11.5%	11.6%	10.2%	10.6%
80	September 6, 2016	10.1%	10.8%	9.5%	9.3%
81	September 7, 2016	11.3%	12.0%	9.5%	9.6%
82	September 8, 2016	9.7%	10.5%	9.9%	10.3%
83	September 12, 2016	7.6%	8.6%	8.0%	8.2%
84	September 13, 2016	9.7%	9.6%	10.1%	10.6%
85	September 16, 2016	5.2%	<7.1%	5.1%	<7.1%
86	September 19, 2016	9.3%	9.5%	8.5%	9.7%
87	September 20, 2016	10.2%	10.5%	10.5%	11.6%
88	September 21, 2016	10.2%	10.4%	9.9%	10.2%
89	September 22, 2016	10.4%	10.7%	9.4%	9.5%
90	September 23, 2016	10.0%	10.1%	10.1%	10.7%
91	September 26, 2016	10.8%	10.5%	10.0%	10.0%
92	September 27, 2016	10.4%	10.4%	10.1%	10.3%
93	September 28, 2016	10.5%	10.0%	10.1%	10.5%
94	September 29, 2016	10.6%	10.4%	9.6%	9.9%
95	September 30, 2016	9.3%	8.2%	9.0%	9.5%
96	October 3, 2016	10.7%	10.8%	10.5%	10.8%
97	October 4, 2016	10.8%	10.7%	9.5%	9.4%
98	October 6, 2016	9.2%	9.1%	8.5%	8.6%
99	October 7, 2016	9.4%	8.5%	9.0%	9.4%
100	October 10, 2016	11.9%	12.0%	10.4%	10.9%
101	October 12, 2016	10.3%	10.4%	9.4%	10.0%
102	October 13, 2016	10.8%	11.7%	9.4%	9.7%
103	October 17, 2016	10.0%	10.5%	9.7%	10.1%
104	October 18, 2016	11.0%	11.4%	10.0%	10.3%
105	October 19, 2016	9.4%	9.3%	8.9%	9.1%
106	October 20, 2016	10.6%	11.6%	9.4%	9.3%
107	October 24, 2016	10.8%	11.1%	9.1%	9.5%
108	October 26, 2016	9.2%	8.8%	8.9%	9.5%
109	October 27, 2016	8.6%	8.6%	8.5%	8.6%
110	October 28, 2016	9.1%	8.5%	7.4%	7.6%
111	October 31, 2016	9.5%	9.9%	8.9%	9.1%
112	November 2, 2016	9.6%	9.2%	8.6%	8.9%
113	November 3, 2016	9.2%	9.6%	7.6%	8.0%
114	November 4, 2016	8.7%	8.5%	7.7%	7.7%
115	November 7, 2016	9.3%	8.7%	8.1%	8.3%
116	November 8, 2016	9.3%	9.2%	9.0%	9.6%
117	November 9, 2016	10.5%	10.4%	10.0%	10.0%
118	November 10, 2016	9.1%	8.9%	8.8%	9.1%
119	November 10, 2016	8.6%	8.3%	8.4%	8.6%
120	November 11, 2016	9.1%	9.0%	8.3%	7.9%
Average		9.455%	9.458%	9.208%	9.806%

== Awards and nominations ==
Year	Award	Category	Recipient	Result
2016	5th APAN Star Awards	Excellence Award, Actress in a Serial Drama	Hong Eun-hee	Nominated
2016	36th MBC Drama Awards	Top Excellence Award, Actress in a Serial Drama	Hong Eun-hee	Nominated
2016	36th MBC Drama Awards	Top Excellence Award, Actor in a Serial Drama	Park Gun-hyung	Nominated
2016	36th MBC Drama Awards	Golden Acting Award, Actor in a Serial Drama	Han Ji-sang	Nominated
2016	36th MBC Drama Awards	Best New Actress	Oh Jung-yeon	Nominated
2016	36th MBC Drama Awards	Best Young Actress	Goo Geon-min	Won
