= Foxy Lady (manga) =

Japanese manga series

- Foxy Lady: Volume 1

疾風可憐迅雷狐娘! (Shippū Karen Jinrai Komusume!)
- Genre: Romance, Fantasy, kemonomimi
- Manga
- Written by: Ayun Tachibana
- Published by: Studio DNA
- English publisher: NA / UK: Tokyopop
- Original run: November 26, 2002 – March 3, 2005
- Volumes: 5

Foxy Lady (疾風可憐迅雷狐娘!, Shippū Karen Jinrai Komusume!) is a manga created by Ayun Tachibana. It is a mixture of romantic fantasy which also fits into the kemonomimi genre. It is about Kogane Mikasa, a kitsunemimi (fox-girl), who is half-human and half-demon. She enters the human world via a shrine run by her aunt and uncle, and dedicated to her father. When she arrives into the human world, she encounters a trainee priest and heir to the shrine Jin Mikasa. Kogane forms a friendship with Jin after she kisses him. When they kiss, Kogane is able to achieve her ambition of turning into a human, albeit temporarily.

The series published five volumes published by Studio DNA in Japanese between November 26, 2002, and March 3, 2005. The work has been published in English, with the first volume released by Tokyopop on May 1, 2008, and the second in July 2010.

== Plot ==
Jin Mikasa is the heir to the Mikasa shrine, currently seen over by his father and dedicated to Doukan-San. One day, a mysterious fox-girl called Kogane Mikasa appears at the shrine, who claims to be half-human and half-demon. She first stays with Jin and Sogo Aoyagi, a childhood friend of Jin's who is self-centered at times. Worried about Doukan-San discovering her, Jin and Kogane hide in Sogo's wardrobe, where they accidentally kiss. The kiss causes her to lose her fox-like appearances and turn into a human, something she has always wanted. However, the change is only temporarily and she needs to be kissed repeatedly to remain human. Also, she cannot use magic when she is human. Her fate is determined by who she marries, and she wants to marry a human, specifically Jin, and be human.

Doukan-San discovers where Kogane is hiding, but Jin is surprised to learn that she is Doukan-San's daughter, with him being a demon and his wife being a human. Jin is also surprised to learn that Kogane's mother is his aunt and that Kogane is his cousin. Kogane stays in the human world and learns to adapt to it. She eventually goes to Jin's school, where she meets Kanoto Okubo, another of Jin's school friends, and occult club member Sachi Usui, who brings Izume-Chan, a weasel-girl who was Kogane's long-time friend [currently angry at Kogane], to the human world.

== Reception ==
Foxy Lady has had mixed reviews. Leroy Douresseaux from comicbookbin.com praised the art, but went onto say that, "For the most part, Foxy Lady is a comic fantasy romp, although there are many romantic moments. The narrative feels awkward when Tachibana tries to force this to be a fantasy romance and the pace becomes clunky with too many dry spots – more stops than starts. In the second half of this volume, the stories focus on fantasy scenarios with comic implications, rather than romantic one; then, Foxy Lady really starts to come to life. It will be interesting to see where this goes."

Nadia Oxford of mania.com was more critical saying, "Foxy Lady isn't terrible; it's just manga at its most typical. The jokes are stale, as are the character designs. With dozens of quality titles out there, there's simply no reason to pick it up. Thinking about it though, creating a mediocre title is worse than creating a bad one: bad books, movies and manga are acknowledged through word of mouth. Mediocre works just fade into obscurity and then fall into the bargain bin, which is the next dimension Foxy Lady is destined for."

Holly Ellingwood from activeanime.com was more positive about Foxy Lady, stating that, "Foxy Lady has a rich and glossy style that is imminently attractive. Being a romantic comedy, bordering on harem, it has excellent and gorgeous female character designs. But the artist doesn't shirk on the male characters either, giving them appealing detail and style as well. The illustrations are competent and confident enough that it makes the manga easily imagined as an anime due to its fluidity and high quality imagery."
