= Teresa Cheung Siu-wai =

Teresa Cheung
- Born: June 10, 1963 (age 63); Hong Kong
- Occupations: Actress; singer; writer
- Spouse: Kenny Bee (m. 1987; div. 1997)
- Musical career
- Also known as: Cheung Yung-fong; Teresa Bee
- Website: teresa.cc

Teresa Cheung Siu-wai (Chinese: 章小蕙) (born June 10, 1963), is a Hong Kong–Canadian socialite and columnist. She used the stage name Cheung Yung-fong (章蓉舫) in the 1990s. Although she dabbled in acting and singing, she is best known for her glamorous profile as a fashion icon.

== Early life ==
Cheung was born in Hong Kong to a family of Jiangnan descent. Her grandfather was a senior official in the Republic of China. Her father, Francis Cheung (章建国), born in Shaoxing, was a illustrator before establishing an advertisement agency in Hong Kong. She has three brothers and two sisters. In 1980, when she was 15, the Cheung family immigrated to Toronto, Canada.

Cheung appeared in her first advertisement at the age of three. In 1984, her father founded Chinavision, which became Canada’s first nationwide Chinese-language television network, before it was acquired in 1992 by Fairchild Television. At the age of 19, Cheung served as her father’s Chinese–English interpreter before the Canadian Radio-television and Telecommunications Commission (CRTC) during hearings for the issuance of a cable broadcasting licence.

Cheung attended primary and secondary school at Maryknoll Convent School, Hong Kong. After relocating to Canada, she entered the University of Toronto, majoring in Fine Arts History and English literature. Just months away from completing a master’s degree in museology/museum studies at the Fashion Institute of Technology in New York, with the intention of becoming a curator, her plans were cut short by her "flash marriage" to Kenny Bee in January 1988. After her marriage, she returned to Hong Kong, where she initially adopted Cheung Yung-fong (章蓉舫), her grandfather's courtesy name, as her stage name when entering public life, and later also became known as Teresa Bee (B嫂).

== Career ==
Cheung first gained public recognition as the wife of Kenny Bee, with media attention drawn to her glamorous public image as a fashionista. She briefly pursued a singing career in Taiwan in the early 1990s, including recording duets with Bee. After the couple suffered major financial losses during the 1997 Asian financial crisis and subsequently divorced, Cheung began writing columns to support herself, notably for Ming Pao Weekly from 1997 to 2005. At her peak, she wrote up to twenty columns across Hong Kong publications, with a style influenced by Joan Didion and Carrie Bradshaw from Sex and the City. In 1999, she temporarily suspended her other columns to write exclusively for Emperor Group's newly launched website in exchange for an advance on one year’s fees, which she used to open a fashion boutique that operated from 1999 to 2003 until she shut it down during the SARS epidemic. Afterward, she increasingly spent time outside Hong Kong, in Los Angeles, Taipei, and Beijing.

She played her first and only major role in the film Colour Blossoms (2004), which director Yonfan stated was inspired by her. From 2005 to 2006, she signed with an agency under China Central Television (CCTV). However, before she explored her career in mainland China, she left Hong Kong in mid-2006 for Los Angeles, where her son had been enrolled in a military academy in 2003. In 2006, Cheung signed with a US agency. Although she did not receive many acting roles during her time in Hollywood, she was involved in fundraising and production work, including financing for Oliver Stone’s film W. (2008) through connections she had built in the Asian film industry during her time with CCTV; she was subsequently credited as an executive producer on the film and appeared in a cameo role as the journalist “Miss China.”

After spending 12 years in Los Angeles, Cheung moved back to Asia in 2018 and experienced a renewed public profile through her WeChat official account "a rose is a rose is a rose”, gaining popularity especially among younger generation as a fashion icon. Since 2021, she has resided in Shanghai and has primarily focused on self-media activities and e-commerce livestreaming in China.

== Personal life ==
In January 1988, Cheung married Hong Kong pop singer and actor Kenny Bee, whom she first met at his concert in Toronto in 1986 and began dating after reconnecting in Hong Kong. She withdrew from a master’s program at the Fashion Institute of Technology in New York to marry him, against her family’s wishes. The couple had a son, born in February 1990, and a daughter, born in March 1995.

In 1996, Cheung and Bee borrowed approximately HK$154 million to invest in Hong Kong real estate, with Bee signing the loan agreements and businessman Edmund Chan acting as guarantor. Following the 1997 Asian financial crisis, the speculative investments failed. Including accrued interest, the couple's outstanding debt rose to around HK$250 million. The financial collapse led to a highly publicized divorce, finalized in 1999, after which they were each held liable for their debt. During the divorce battle, Bee attributed the losses to Cheung’s investment decisions, while both parties accused each other of extramarital relationships—Bee with Fan-Chiang Su-zhen and Cheung with Chan, who was married to Cheung's friend and model Susanna Chung. Cheung, however, stated that after the birth of their daughter, amid the breakdown of their relationship, she reached a mutual understanding regarding an open marriage with Bee, along with Bee’s precedent affair with Fan-Chiang, leading to her relationship with Chan.

With Cheung went public with Chan in 1996, he divorced Chung the next year. Chung, who had publicly denounced Cheung and Chan in her final days, died of cancer in 1998. Cheung and Chan briefly broke up in 1999 when she accused him of physical assault, before reconciling in the same year. Their relationship ended in 2002, following the consecutive bankruptcies of both Bee and Chan that year, due to longstanding debt stemming from the 1997 Asian financial crisis. In 2003, Cheung prevailed in litigation against the lender, which reduced her financial liability from her share of the marital debt, half of HK$250 million, to about HK$2.5 million.

In the late 1990s and early 2000s, Cheung was widely labeled as a symbol of extravagance and excess, and was sometimes characterized as a “femme fatale” in connection with the financial collapses of both Bee and Chan. Amid sustained and unfavorable media scrutiny in Hong Kong, she relocated to Los Angeles in 2006, where her son had been enrolled in a military academy since 2003. Following her return to Asia in 2018, Cheung experienced a noticeable rehabilitation of her public image, particularly among younger audiences, amid broader reflections on the early media treatment of female celebrities.

== Filmography ==
Year	Title	Role	Notes
2004	Colour Blossoms	Meili	
2008	W.	Asian journalist	Cameo; also credited as executive producer.

== Awards and nominations ==
Year	Awards group	Award category—Film	Result	Ref.
2005	Cinemanila International Film Festival	Rising Star Award—Colour Blossoms	Won	
2005	Chennai International Film Festival Awards	Most Promising Actress—Colour Blossoms	Won	
2005	Hong Kong Film Awards	Best New Performer—Colour Blossoms	Nominated	
2005	Hong Kong Film Critics Society Awards	Best Actress—Colour Blossoms	Nominated	
