= Harisu (album) =

- Korean CD cover

Studio album by Harisu
- Released: January 24, 2006 (S. Korea); 2006 (Taiwan and China)
- Genres: K-Pop, Mandopop
- Length: 48:35 (S. Korea); 56:30 (Taiwan); 44:34 (China)
- Languages: Korean, Mandarin, English
- Labels: G&F/Universal (S. Korea); Himalaya Records (Taiwan); Yi Zhou (China)

Harisu chronology
Foxy Lady (2004)	Harisu (2006)	Summer (2006)

Alternative covers
- Taiwanese CD cover

Alternative cover
- Chinese CD cover

Harisu is the self-titled fourth studio album by Harisu, released in South Korea by Universal Music on January 24, 2006. It was seen as her comeback album following a two-year absence from the Korean music scene, and marked a change in her image with an emphasis on being "cute" rather than "sexy". The album itself features pop music that ranges in style between R&B, hip hop, disco and slow ballads. Harisu's then boyfriend (now ex-husband) Micky Jung also worked on the album, his contributions including a rap on "Winter Story", which was released as a digital single in December 2005. A music video was filmed for lead track "Reaction", a song written by Shin Myeong-gu, who had previously produced albums for Diva and NRG. The album peaked at #46 on the MIAK K-pop albums chart, selling 1,596 copies in its first month of release.

Harisu was also released in Taiwan and China, with the addition of Mandarin-language versions of "Reaction" and "Sleeping Beauty". The Chinese CD omitted several other tracks, but was packaged with a photo booklet and bonus VCD, containing music videos and TV footage.

== Track listing (Korea) ==
1. "Prologue" – 0:51
2. "Reaction" – 3:10
3. "One More Time" – 3:58
4. "One Time" – 3:06
5. "눈이 내리면... (Winter Story)" – 3:28
6. "잠자는 숲속의 공주 (Sleeping Beauty)" – 4:11
7. "Shake Song" – 3:43
8. "I’m OK" – 3:41
9. "Baby Boo" – 3:48
10. "마지막 바램" – 3:21
11. "Secret" – 3:24
12. "그대가 그대를..." – 4:37
13. "Shadow" (remix) – 3:32
14. "눈이 내리면... (Winter Story)" (remix) – 3:39

== Track listing (Taiwan) ==
Note: Tracks 2 and 3 are Mandarin-language versions of tracks 4 and 8, respectively.

1. "Prologue" – 0:51
2. "舞法自拔" – 3:14
3. "被愛的機會" – 4:14
4. "Reaction" – 3:10
5. "One More Time" – 3:58
6. "One Time" – 3:06
7. "눈이 내리면... (Winter Story)" – 3:28
8. "잠자는 숲속의 공주 (Sleeping Beauty)" – 4:11
9. "Shake Song" – 3:43
10. "I’m OK" – 3:41
11. "Baby Boo" – 3:48
12. "마지막 바램" – 3:21
13. "Secret" – 3:24
14. "그대가 그대를..." – 4:37
15. "Shadow" (remix) – 3:32
16. "눈이 내리면... (Winter Story)" (remix) – 3:39

== Track listing (China) ==
Note: Tracks 1 and 4 are Mandarin-language versions of tracks 2 and 7, respectively.

1. "舞法自拔" – 3:14
2. "Reaction" – 3:10
3. "One More Time" – 3:58
4. "被爱的机会" – 4:14
5. "One Time" – 3:06
6. "눈이 내리면... (Winter Story)" – 3:28
7. "잠자는 숲속의 공주 (Sleeping Beauty)" – 4:11
8. "I’m OK" – 3:41
9. "마지막 바램" – 3:21
10. "그대가 그대를..." – 4:37
11. "Shadow" (remix) – 3:32
12. "눈이 내리면... (Winter Story)" (remix) – 3:39

=== Bonus VCD ===
1. "Good-Bye 0点10分"
2. "愛的DNA出錯"
3. "Reaction"
4. "狐狸 (Foxy Lady)"
5. "Temptation"
6. "Always" by Kang Sung
7. Harisu TV commercials for Perfect Beauty, DoDo and Sock Stop
8. "Love Hurt"
9. TV and video clips
