= Foxy Lady (Harisu album) =

- Korean CD cover

Studio album by Harisu
- Released: February 2, 2004 (S. Korea); 2005 (Taiwan, China, Malaysia)
- Genres: K-Pop, Mandopop
- Length: 58:22 (S. Korea); 74:47 (Taiwan); 69:52 (China, Malaysia)
- Languages: Korean, Mandarin, English
- Labels: Plyzen (S. Korea); EMI (Taiwan); Jiangwen Records (China); Acclaim (Malaysia)

Harisu chronology
Liar (2002)	Foxy Lady (2004)	Harisu (2006)

Alternative covers
- Chinese CD cover

Alternative cover
- Malaysian CD cover

Foxy Lady is the third studio album by South Korean singer Harisu, released on February 2, 2004, following an acrimonious split with her management company. It marked a change in her musical style, moving away from the techno sound of her previous albums and focusing more on hip hop and R&B. Working titles for the album included Happy My Life, also the name of a song on Liar, and No. 1, to signify a new stage in her career. A music video was filmed for the title track, "Foxy Lady", but it failed to make the top 50 in the MIAK K-pop album chart.

In 2005, Foxy Lady was released in Taiwan, China, and Malaysia, with the addition of several tracks re-recorded in Mandarin, though she required a tutor to help with the pronunciation of the Chinese words. The album was released by EMI in Taiwan, where she was promoted as the "Kylie Minogue of the East". In China it was accompanied by a DVD of her music videos, and was also released in a special hardback photo book format.

== Track listing (Korea) ==
1. "Intro" – 1:03
2. "Foxy Lady" – 3:43
3. "사랑하는 동안 (While Love)" – 3:25
4. "Just in Time" – 4:00
5. "Good-Bye" – 3:58
6. "해봐 (Tell)" – 3:27
7. "난 대기중, 넌 부재중 (I'm Waiting, You're Not Here)" – 3:50
8. "Do it Like This, Do it Like That" – 3:37
9. "바보 (Fool)" – 3:30
10. "왜 (Why)" – 3:42
11. "Just for You" – 3:44
12. "뒤로 (Back)" – 3:51
13. "우리들의 겨울 (Winter in the US)" – 5:04
14. "난 대기중, 넌 부재중" (I'm Waiting, You're Not Here remix) – 3:49
15. "Good-Bye" (acoustic) – 3:55
16. "Foxy Lady" (chorus instrumental) – 3:36

== Track listing (overseas) ==
Note: Tracks 6–19 are the same as tracks 2–15 on the Korean release. Tracks 2–5 are Mandarin-language versions of tracks 6, 7, 9 and 19, respectively. Track #19 is included on the Taiwanese release only.

1. "Intro" – 1:03
2. "狐狸 (Foxy Lady)" – 3:46
3. "爱的DNA出错" – 3:27
4. "Good-Bye 0点10分" – 4:09
5. "Good-Bye 0点10分" (acoustic) – 4:00
6. "Foxy Lady" – 3:43
7. "相爱的时候" – 3:25
8. "Just in Time" – 4:00
9. "Good-Bye" – 3:58
10. "试试看" – 3:27
11. "我等待, 你不在" – 3:50
12. "Do it Like This, Do it Like That" – 3:37
13. "生疏的爱" – 3:30
14. "为什么" – 3:42
15. "Just for You" – 3:44
16. "向后走" – 3:51
17. "我们的冬天" – 5:04
18. "我等待, 你不在" (remix) – 3:49
19. "Good-Bye" (acoustic) – 3:55
20. "狐狸 (Foxy Lady)" (karaoke) – 3:37

=== Bonus DVD ===
Note: The bonus DVD is included with the Chinese release only.

1. "狐狸 (Foxy Lady)"
2. "Good-Bye 0点10分"
3. TV clips
4. "爱的DNA出错"
