= Hi! Honey (TV series) =

Taiwanese television drama series

- Starring: Pace Wu; Shi Yi Nan; Harisu
- Country of origin: Republic of China (Taiwan)
- Original language: Mandarin
- No. of episodes: 21

Production
- Running time: 45-50 mins.

Original release
- Network: CTV

Hi! Honey (Traditional Chinese: 嗨！親愛的) is a Taiwanese television drama series that aired on CTV in 2004. The series ran for a total of 21 episodes, and starred Pace Wu, Shi Yinan and Harisu. Harisu's lines were spoken in her native Korean and later dubbed into Mandarin.

== Cast list ==
- Pace Wu — Xu Tianzhen
- Shi Yinan — Shu Li
- Harisu — Lu Jialing
- Margaret Lin Liwen — Xu Tianqing
- Eddie Xu Junhao — Guan Shang'en
- Gao Congkai — Gao Chenwei
- Chen Baiyu — Xiao Man
- Fu Lei — Shu Hanji
- Sun Xing — Xu Shude
- Liu Yukai — Xiao Ye
- Li Chenxi — Zhi Zhi
- Xu Jiehui — Cheng Jie
