= Temptation (Harisu album) =

Studio album by Harisu
- Released: September 22, 2001 (S. Korea)
- Genre: K-pop
- Length: 43:28
- Language: Korean, English
- Label: Seoul Records Co. (S. Korea); Power International (Taiwan); Formula Recordings (Japan)

Harisu chronology
Temptation (2001)	Liar (2002)

Temptation is the debut studio album by South Korean entertainer Harisu, released on September 22, 2001. The songs are a mix of techno-style K-pop and slow ballads, and a music video was filmed for the title track, "Temptation". It peaked at #32 on the MIAK K-pop albums chart, and sold 25,474 copies in its first two months of release.

Temptation was also released in Taiwan, where it was packaged with a hardcover photobook and bonus VCD.

== Track listing ==
1. "Prologue" – 2:04
2. "악몽 (Nightmare)" – 3:26
3. "D-Day" – 3:48
4. "Temptation" – 3:43
5. "Knife" – 3.54
6. "Love Hurt" – 3:43
7. "비밀 (Secret)" – 3:43
8. "Shadow" – 3:47
9. "이별속에서 (Separation)" – 4:01
10. "Fantasy" – 3:29
11. "Memory" – 4:03
12. "Don't Stop" – 3:46
