= Summer (Harisu album) =

Studio album by Harisu
- Released: July 25, 2006
- Genre: K-Pop
- Length: 41:13
- Language: Korean, English
- Label: G&F/Seoul Media

Harisu chronology
Harisu (2006)	Summer (2006)

Summer is the fifth studio album by South Korean entertainer Harisu, released on July 25, 2006. The music is similar in style to her previous album, and it again features the rapping skills of Micky Jung, Harisu's then boyfriend, now husband.

== Track listing ==
1. "What is "Risu" Summer Time" (Intro) – 0:37
2. "멋진남자" – 3:32
3. "Funky Girls" – 3:12
4. "벌(罰)" – 3:23
5. "Summer Summer" – 3:25
6. "I Wish Fly" – 3:09
7. "나의 7전8기" – 3:12
8. "여름아" – 3:23
9. "Time Out" – 3:25
10. "잘못된 만남" – 3:19
11. "인형" – 3:37
12. "Summer Summer" (Summer remix) – 3:30
13. "벌(罰)" (MR) – 3:24
