= Dong-a University Hospital =

Dong-A University Hospital

Geography
- Location: 3-1Ga, Dongdaeshin-Dong, Seo-gu, Busan 602-714,, Gyeongsangnam-do, South Korea
- Coordinates: 35°07′12″N 128°01′03″E

Organisation
- Type: General hospital, Teaching hospital
- Affiliated university: Dong-A University

Services
- Beds: 992

History
- Opened: March 26, 1990

Links
- Website: www.damc.or.kr/damc_home/main.jsp
- Lists: Hospitals in South Korea

- Dong-a University Hospital
- Hangul: 동아대학교병원
- Hanja: 東亞大學校病院
- RR: Donga daehakgyo byeongwon
- MR: Tonga taehakkyo pyŏngwŏn

Located in Busan, South Korea

Dong-A University Hospital (Korean: 동아대학교병원) is a major general hospital affiliated with Dong-A University in Busan, South Korea.

The hospital is situated in the Seo-gu area of Busan, within 20 minutes of Dong-A University's Seunghak and Bumin campuses. The land which it covers is at the foot of Mt. Gudeok and Daeshin Citizens' Park, and is shared between the College of Social Sciences, College of Arts, College of Medicine, School of Mass Communication and Graduate School of Social Welfare. The campus also contains the Dong-A University Museum building.

In December 2010, a groundbreaking ceremony was held for the construction of a new main building that will house the Regional Clinical Trial Center, ER and a Heart-Brain Center. The new building covers 8.7 square kilometers and has an estimated budget of 28.2 billion South Korean won.

== Overview ==
- Total Licensed Beds: 992
- Outpatients: Approximately 2,800/day
- Staff: Approximately 1,700
- Land Area: 81,286m^{2}

== Founding purposes ==
Grounded on both the founding ideas of Dong-A University and the policies of Korean medical education, DAUH's aims are to produce qualified medical personnel to serve for the improved health and welfare of the regional community and the nation. The following points were identified as operating criteria:

- To focus on clinical and medical research as an educational hospital and enhance creative medical development
- Clinical education of medical students into specialists
- Supply of quality medical services to meet the medical demands of regional residents and practice humanitarianism
- Consistent professional development training for medical staff

== Research and study ==
Dong-A University Hospital specializes in heart and brain research. A new 'Heart-Brain Center' is under construction and due for completion in June 2012.

Other areas of research at the Center include: Gastroenterology, Cardiology, Pulmonology, Allergy, Endocrinology, Nephrology, Hemato-oncology, Hepato-oncology, Infection, Rheumatology, Orthopedics, General Surgery, Plastic Surgery, Thoracic Surgery, Neurosurgery, Obstetrics & Gynecology, ENT, Family Medicine, Rehabilitation Medicine, Pediatrics, Anesthesiology, Dermatology, Neurology, Psychiatry, Diagnostics, Pathology, Radiology, Radiological Oncology, Ophthalmology, Urology, Nuclear Medicine.

== Medical equipment ==
Dong-A University Hospital is equipped with medical equipment, funded through regular government and industry grants.

- Da Vinci Robotic Surgery
- Novalis
- PET CT
- MRI
- CT
- RITA
- Gamma Camera
- LINAC

== Regional clinical trial center ==
The Dong-A University Regional Clinical Trial Center performs clinical research services for the academic and private sectors. The Center completed 105 investigator-initiated and 96 sponsor-initiated trials in 2010. An MOU was recently signed between this trial center and the clinical trial unit at Asan Medical Center in Seoul. The center is also actively participating in nationwide collaborative research with other prominent Korean institutions.

The CTC's director is Dr Moo-Hyun Kim, a cardiologist.

== Specialist divisions ==
In fulfilling its role as a hub for medical specialists, Dong-A University Hospital is home to various centers of expertise, including: the Robotic Surgery Center, General Health Promotion Center, Stroke Center, Cancer Center, Breast Center, Parkinson's Disease Center, Spine Center, Transfusion-free Medicine & Surgery Center, Cardiovascular Center, Gastroenterology Center, Novalis Radiosurgery Center, Organ Transplant Center, Emergency Medical Center, Clinical Test Research Center, Mental Health Center, and the Sunflower Children's Center.

=== Robotic Surgery Center ===
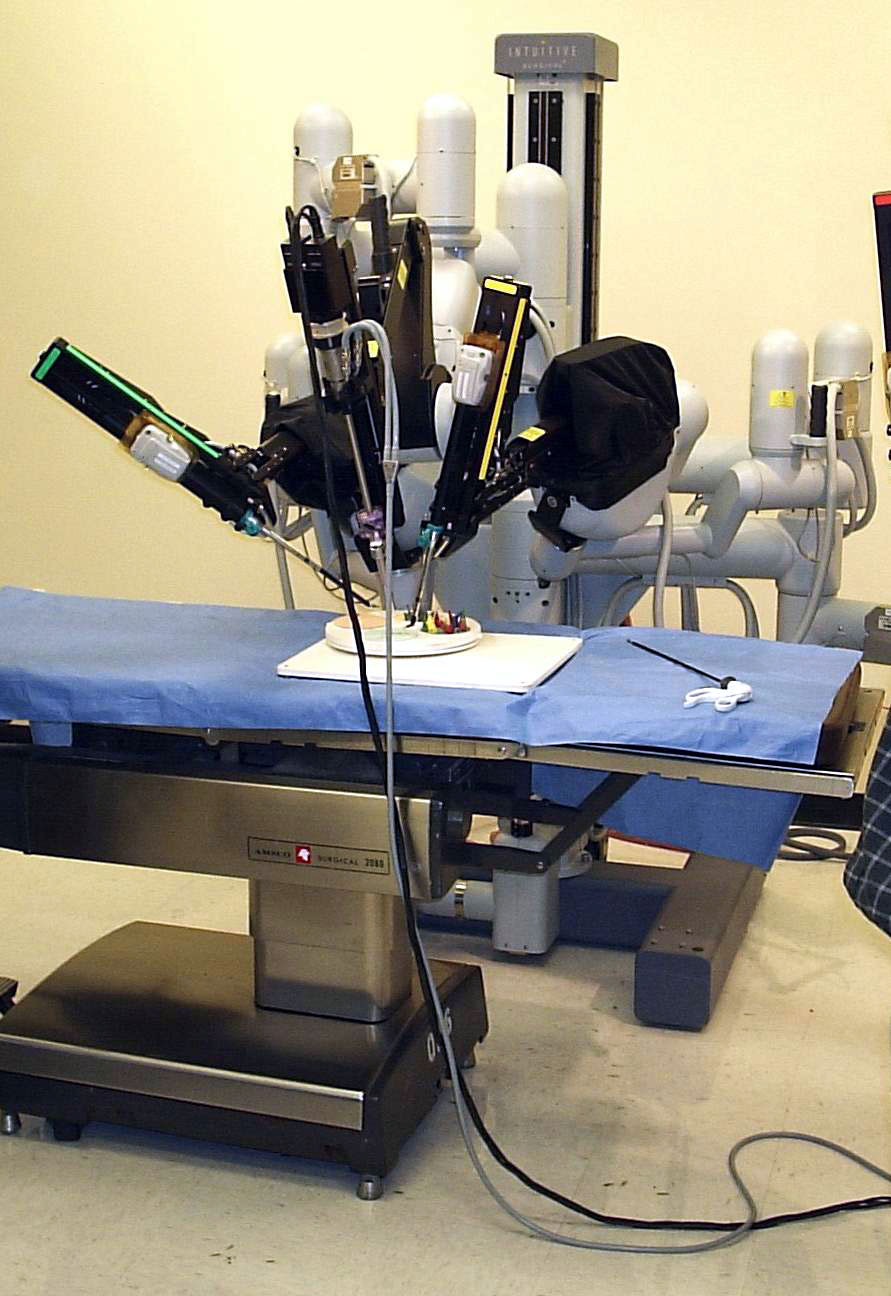
The Robotic Surgery Center operates the da Vinci Surgical system

The Da Vinci Surgical system is a surgical operating system approved by the US Food and Drug Administration in 2002. In April 2004, a robotic-assisted radical prostatectomy was first performed successfully in a Korean patient with localized prostate cancer by the urology team at the Robotic Surgery Center of Dong-A University Hospital in Singapore. Currently, more than 20 Da Vinci Robots are presently in Korea for the application of various surgical procedures. The system provides dexterous surgical precision with 10-15X magnified 3D images and improves the rate of successful delicate surgical movements when compared with skilled human hands. Other advantages of the Da Vinci System include:

- Shortened hospitalization periods
- Decreased pain
- Earlier recovery and return to social life
- Minimal surgical scars and a subsequent reduction in the risk of infection
- Significantly decreased blood loss resulting in reduced transfusion requirements

Current indications for robotic cancer surgery

- Prostatectomy: prostatic cancer
- Nephrectomy: renal cancer
- Cystectomy: bladder cancer
- Pyeloplasty: ureteral stricture
- Gastrectomy: stomach cancer
- Thyroidectomy: thyroid cancer
- Esophagectomy: esophageal cancer
- Lobectomy of lung: lung cancer
- Hysterectomy: uterine cancer

=== Regional cardiocerebrovascular center ===
Dong-A University Hospital is a major location for cardiovascular and cerebrovascular care in Busan-Gyeongnam region.

=== Cancer center ===
Quality treatment is provided in DAUH's cancer-specialization center in cooperation with the departments of hemato-oncology, plastic and reconstructive surgery, radiology, radiation oncology and general surgery. The Breast Center focuses on early diagnosis of breast cancer, surgical intervention and breast reconstructive surgery.

=== Parkinson's Disease Center ===
The Parkinson's Disease Center is a full service diagnostic center for Parkinson's disease. The center offers comprehensive approaches for diagnostic, surgical and rehabilitative services for patients with Parkinson's disease and parkinsonism. Detailed diagnostic procedures can determine origins as an occupational disease, the presence of accompanying dementia, and the need for the surgical intervention.

=== Gastroenterology Center ===
Operated by the division of digestive diseases, this center is divided into a stomach-esophagus clinic, colon-anus clinic, liver clinic and pancreas-bile clinic. Centered on the departments of gastroenterology and general surgery, the center also provides follow-up counseling after treatment.

=== Novalis Radiosurgery Center ===
Novalis is a modern surgical device for non-invasive treatment of cancerous tissue. Also accessible to the departments of neurosurgery and radiation oncology, it is primarily used for brain tumors, spine tumors and malignant transformations.

=== Sunflower Women & Children's Center ===
The Sunflower Women & Children's Center is an outreach effort to protect children from sexual violence. The center also offers diagnosis and counseling by specialists from obstetrics & gynecology, psychiatry and clinical psychology as well as provides advisory lawyers.

== Location ==
Dong-A University Hospital is located in Seo-gu.
