= Yellow Hair =

- Theatrical poster
- Hangul: 노랑머리
- RR: Norangmeori
- MR: Norangmŏri
- Directed by: Kim Yu-min
- Written by: Son Jeong-seob
- Produced by: Yeo Han-ku
- Starring: Lee Jae-eun; Kim Ki-yeon; Kim Hyeon-cheol
- Cinematography: Lee Eun-gil
- Edited by: Kim Sang-bum
- Music by: Ahn Ji-hong
- Distributed by: Korean Motion Picture Promotion Corporation
- Release date: 26 June 1999
- Running time: 85 minutes
- Country: South Korea
- Language: Korean

Yellow Hair (Korean: 노랑머리) is a 1999 South Korean erotic thriller film, written and directed by Kim Yu-min, and starring former child actress Lee Jae-eun. The film caused controversy for its strong sexual content, and was only approved for release after some of the more explicit material was cut. The film's English title is sometimes given as The Blonde.

A sequel, Yellow Hair 2, was released in 2001.

== Plot ==
Yu-na and Sang-hee are two young women with dyed-yellow hair who live and sleep together, and do not care for the usual responsibilities of life, simply doing what they want. At a club that they frequent, they meet Yeong-kyu, another person drifting through life, and Yu-na brings him back to their apartment. Yu-na and Yeong-kyu strike up a sexual relationship, and Sang-hee joins in as well. They two girls are very sexually open with one another, but they become furious when they learn that Yeong-kyu has started seeing an ex-girlfriend, and the girls kill her out of anger. Delirious after a group of young men beat him and the two girls, and rape Yu-na, Yeong-kyu tells the girls that he needs to go see the woman they just murdered. Furious, Yu-na and Sang-hee kill Yeong-kyu, and proceed to vandalize the closed bar that they had taken Yeong-kyu to. When the police catch up with the two girls at the bar, yellow hair having been found in the murdered woman's apartment, they find the two girls having sex with one another.

== Cast ==
- Lee Jae-eun as Yu-na. A former child actress, Lee admitted to being shocked when she first read the script, but was won over by her character's "childlike spontaneity and pure instincts."
- Kim Ki-yeon as Sang-hee
- Kim Hyeon-cheol as Yeong-kyu

== Controversy over sexual content ==
In March 1999, Yellow Hair became the first film to be rejected outright by the Korean Performing Arts Promotion Committee (KPAPC), the organization responsible for film certification and censorship within South Korea. The sexual content of the film, including one scene depicting a threesome, was deemed to be in breach of the committee's guidelines on explicit sex. Committee member Cho Hee-mun stated that "The film contains scenes which are disgusting and totally unacceptable to our moral standards." This decision effectively banned the film from release.

Director Kim Yu-min defended his film, explaining that "The girls use sex to communicate... The sex scenes draw out the characters. I took pains not to sensationalize them." Producer Yeo Han-ku added to this, maintaining that the film "has an important social message." Other critics argued that the committee's ruling was out of touch with the views of contemporary society. An edited version of the film, having roughly a minute of sexual content removed and several scenes darkened and blurred, was later approved for release by the committee.

== Release and critical response ==
Yellow Hair was released in South Korea on 26 June 1999, receiving approximately 200,000 admissions in Seoul. It was also screened at the 3rd Puchon International Fantastic Film Festival, held in July 1999.

In a review for Koreanfilm.org, Tom Giammarco considered it "unfortunate" that many people dismissed the film as "simple pornography", because "there is so much more going on... than gratuitous sex and nudity". However, he also stated, "the film fails to pull itself into the cohesive social satire it aspired to be and must settle for being a straight-forward thriller, interesting but not gripping".

== Awards ==
Year	Awards group	Award category—Recipient	Result	Ref.
1999	Blue Dragon Film Awards	Best New Actress—Lee Jae-eun	Won	
2000	Grand Bell Awards	Best New Actress—Lee Jae-eun	Won	
