= Dong-A University =

University in South Korea

Coordinates: 35.1159°N 128.9673°E

- Seal of the university
- Established: 1946; 80 years ago
- President: Han Suk-Jung
- Undergraduates: 19,000
- Postgraduates: 2,450
- Location: Busan, South Korea
- Campus: Seunghak, Gudeok, Bumin
- Website: www.donga.ac.kr

- Dong-A University
- Hangul: 동아대학교
- Hanja: 東亞大學校
- RR: Donga daehakgyo
- MR: Tonga taehakkyo

Dong-A University (Korean: 동아대학교) is a private university in Busan, South Korea. It is the only private university and one of two universities that has both a medical school and a law school in Busan, the second-largest city in South Korea.

== History ==
In August 1947, the organization established for the creation of Dong-A College, along with Dr. Jae-hwan Jeong pen-named Sokdang as its leader, applied to the Ministry of Education for permission to establish the Dong-A Foundation. Permission was granted and the foundation opened Dong-A College as a four-year college on December 30, 1947 with five departments divided into two schools: School of Liberal Arts and Natural Sciences and School of Law. Departments such as History and English were founded in the mid-1950s. The Central Library was completed in 1957. At present, the university has 9 graduate schools and 11 colleges including 28 divisions and 13 departments with 55 majors.

The Dong-A University Museum was established in 1959. As of 2007, its collection includes over 30,000 artifacts, among them 2 national treasures and 10 treasures. It has published over 75 archaeological reports and annually showcases new material at the joint exhibition sponsored by the Korean Association of University Museums.

Among the alumni are several ministers of the Korean government as well as leaders of major Korean companies.

== Campuses ==
Dong-A University has Seunghak, Gudeok, and Bumin campuses. Seunghak is main campus and Gudeok is smallest campus. Bumin campus is small, but it has high buildings. Many students can use this campus.

=== Seunghak Campus ===
The Seunghak Campus is on the slopes of Mt. Seunghak, where one can get a view of Ulsuk-do, an islet that is home to migratory birds near the mouth of the Nakdong River. With a total area of 704,917 m^{2}, the Seunghak campus accommodates the offices of university administration and the offices of colleges such as the College of Humanities, the College of Natural Sciences, the College of Human Ecology, the College of Business Administration, the College of Natural Resources and Life Sciences, the College of Engineering, and the College of Physical Education. The Seunghak Campus is the location of four graduate schools: the Graduate School of Business Administration, Graduate School of Education, and Graduate School of Industrial Information, as well as 18 research institutes, and 18 subsidiary organizations.

=== Gudeok Campus ===
The Gudeok Campus is 20 minute from the other campuses and is found at the foot of Mt. Gudeok and Daeshin Citizens' Park. The campus is set beside the heavily forested entrance to Daeshin Citizen's Park. The land area of the campus is 45,542 m^{2}. There are three colleges and two graduate schools here including the College of Social Sciences, College of Arts, College of Medicine, School of Mass Communication, and Graduate School of Social Welfare. Additionally, the Gudeok Campus hosts 7 subsidiary research institutes and 2 subsidiary organs. The Dong-A University Medical Center plays a leading medical role in research and treatment in Busan and South Gyeongsang Province areas.

The Gudeok Campus contains some of the oldest buildings on the university, including the Dong-A University Museum building. The museum's exhibit halls were to move to the stately Old Law Courts building at the Bumin Campus and re-open in September 2007.

=== Bumin Campus ===
The Bumin Campus is in the central part of the old heart of Busan. This campus accommodates the College of Law, Graduate school of Law and Police, Graduate School of Northeast Asian Studies, and the Adult Continuing Education Centre. The Bumin Campus also houses research laboratories of the Dong-A University Museum.

== Academic organization ==
=== Seunghak Campus ===
- College of Humanities
- College of Natural Sciences
- College of Engineering
- College of Natural Resources and Life Science
- College of Health Sciences
- College of Design and Environment
- College of Arts and Sports
- Division of Computer Engineering and Artificial Intelligence

=== Gudeok Campus ===
- College of Medicine
- Division of Nursing

=== Bumin Campus ===
- College of Business Administration
- College of Social Sciences
- College of SeokDang Honors
- College of Global Business

=== Graduate school ===
- Graduate School
- Graduate School of Northeast Asian Studies
- Graduate School of Business Administration
- Graduate School of Education
- Graduate School of Industrial Information
- Graduate School of Mass Communication
- Graduate School of Social Welfare
- Graduate School of Law and Police
- Graduate School of Arts
- Graduate School of Computer Engineering and Artificial Intelligence

== Notable alumni ==
Politicians

- Cho Moo-je, former Supreme Court Judge
- Kim Gi-hong, former Supreme Court Judge
- Huh Sung-gwan (Former Minister of Government Administration and Home Affairs, Former Ministry of Oceans and Fisheries)
- Bak Woonchan (Commissioner of the Korea Customs Service)
- Yu Donghoon (Former Permanent Secretary of Culture and Sports)
- Kim Doo-kwan (Congressman of Republic Of Korea, Cabinet of generation 20th, 21st)
- Kim Woo-suk (Former Minister of Public Administration and Security)
- Park Kwan-yong (Congressman of Republic Of Korea, Former Chairman of Congress)
- Moon Daesung (Congressman of Republic Of Korea)
- Bae Deokkwang (Congressman of Republic Of Korea)
- Kim Doeup (Congressman of Republic Of Korea)
- Kim Doo-kwan (Congressman of Republic Of Korea)
- Kim Miae (Congressman of Republic Of Korea)
- Yoon Jun Ho (Congressman of Republic Of Korea)

Military

- Nam Yeong-shin (Chief of Staff of the Republic of Korea Army)

Entrepreneurs

- Kwak Sin-ae (CEO of Barunson Entertainment, winner of the Academy Award for Best Picture at the 2020 Academy Awards for Parasite)
- Kang Byung-joong (CEO of Nexen Tire)
- Shin Chun-ho (Founder, former CEO of Nongshim)
- Aan Yoo-soo (Founder of Ace Bed)

Entertainers

- Hanhae, singer (Phantom)
- Park Ji-il
- Choi Young-joon

== See also ==
- List of colleges and universities in South Korea
- Education in South Korea
