= Outline of North Korea =

Country in East Asia

The Flag of North Korea

The Emblem of North Korea

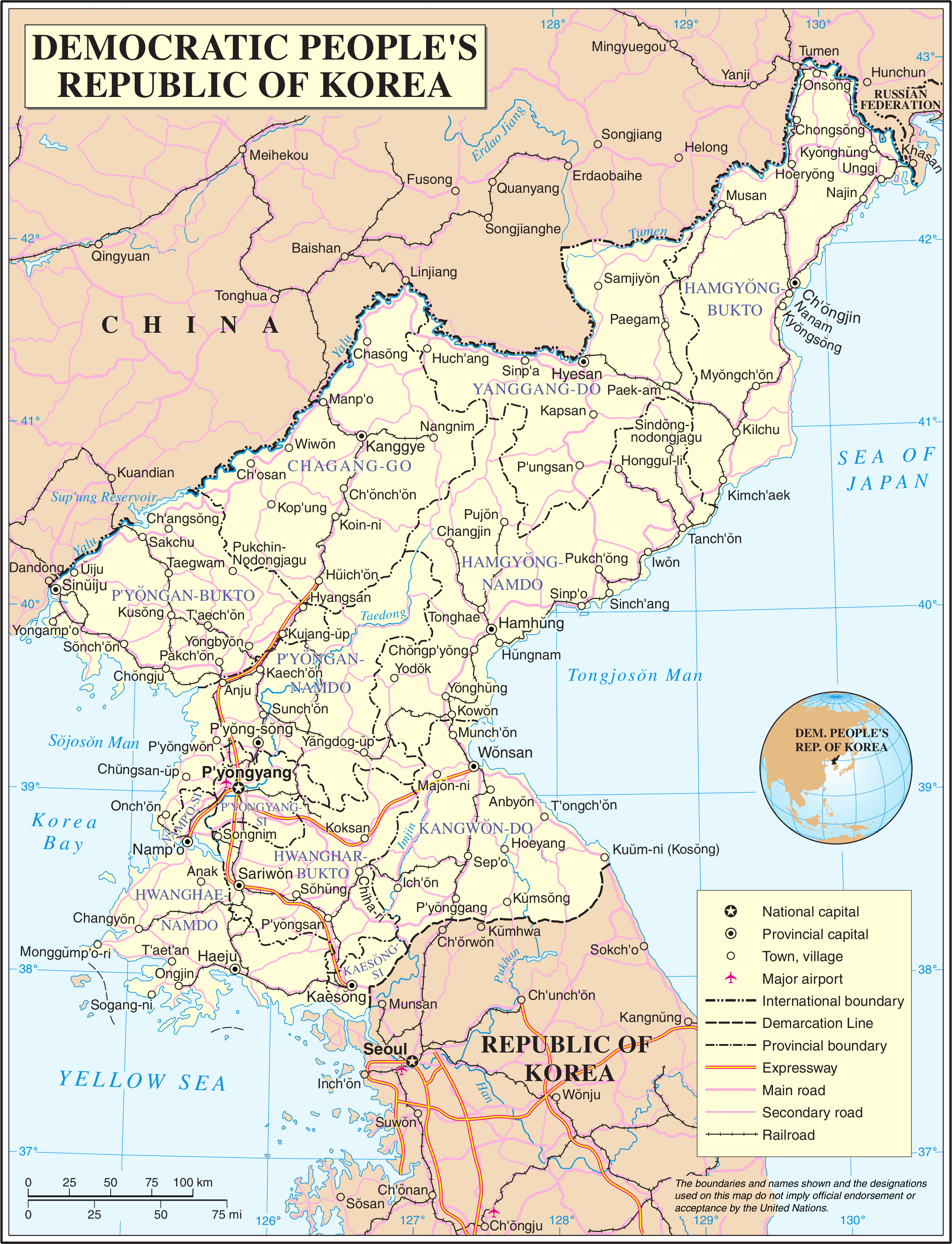
An enlargeable map of North Korea

The following outline is provided as an overview of and topical guide to North Korea:

North Korea is a sovereign country located on the northern half of the Korean Peninsula in East Asia. To the south, separated by the Korean Demilitarized Zone, lies South Korea, with which it formed one nation until division following World War II. At its northern Amnok River border are China and, separated by the Tumen River in the extreme north-east, Russia. The capital of North Korea is the city of Pyongyang.

North Korea is widely considered to be a Stalinist dictatorship. The country's government styles itself as following the Juche ideology of self-reliance, developed by Kim Il Sung, the country's former leader. The current supreme leader is General Secretary Kim Jong Un, the first leader Kim Il Sung's grandson and son of deceased leader Kim Jong Il. Relations are strongest with other officially socialist states: Cuba, Vietnam, Laos, and China, as well as with Russia, Cambodia, and Myanmar. Following a major famine in the early 1990s, due partly to the collapse of the Soviet Union (previously a major economic partner), leader Kim Jong Il instigated the "Military-First" policy in 1995, increasing economic concentration and support for the military.

North Korea's culture is officially promoted and heavily controlled by the government. The Arirang Festivals or "Mass Games" are government-organized events glorifying the regime, involving over 100,000 performers.

== General reference ==
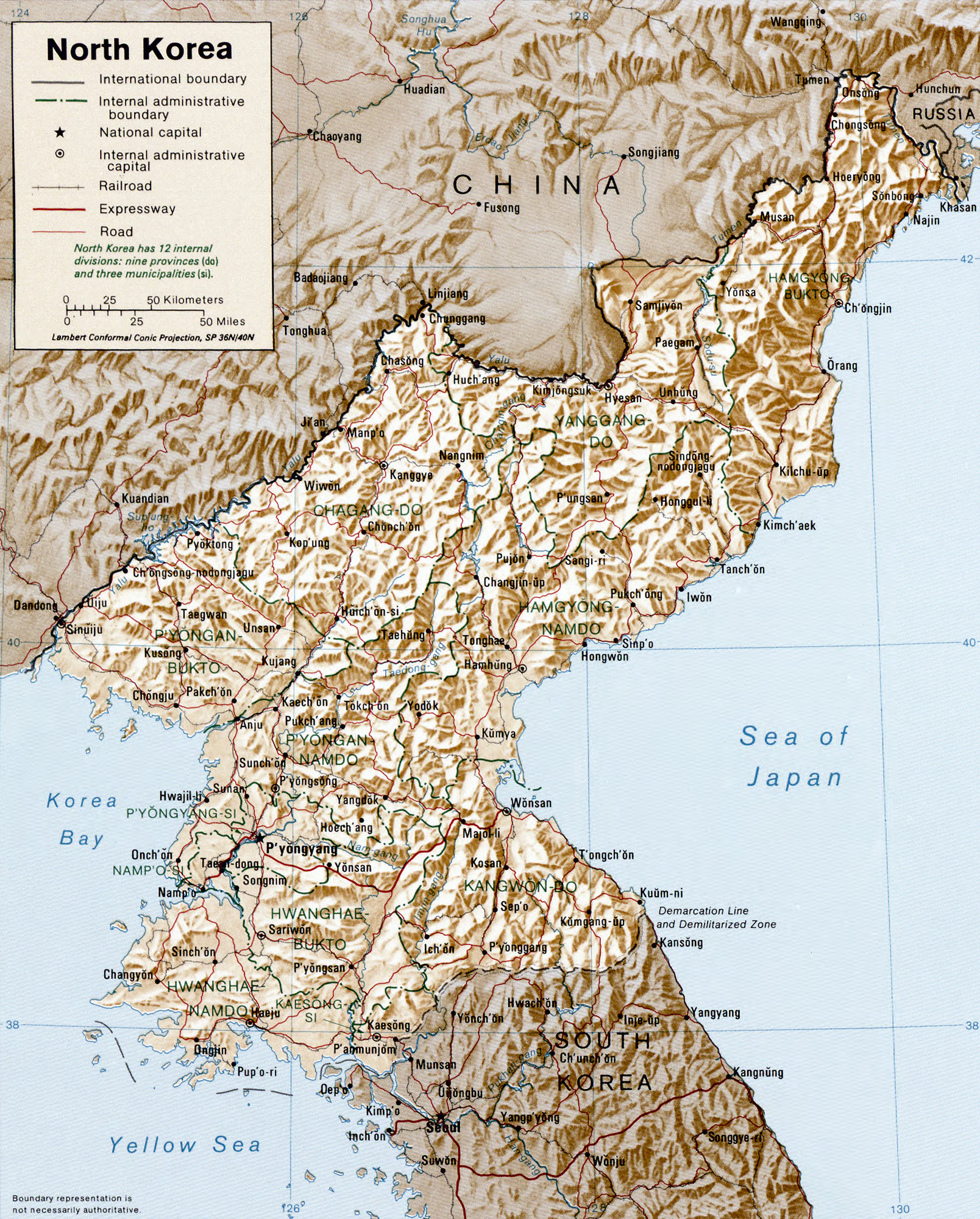
An enlargeable relief map of North Korea

- Pronunciation:
- Common English country name: North Korea
- Official English country name: The Democratic People's Republic of Korea
- Common endonym(s): 조선 (Chosŏn), 북조선 (Bukchosŏn)
- Official endonym(s): 조선민주주의인민공화국 (Chosŏn Minjujuŭi Inmin Konghwaguk)
- Adjectival(s): North Korean
- Demonym(s): Korean, North Korean
- Etymology: Name of North Korea
- ISO country codes: KP, PRK, 408
- ISO region codes: See ISO 3166-2:KP
- Internet country code top-level domain: .kp
- Time in North Korea
  - North Korean calendar
- International rankings of North Korea

== Geography of North Korea ==
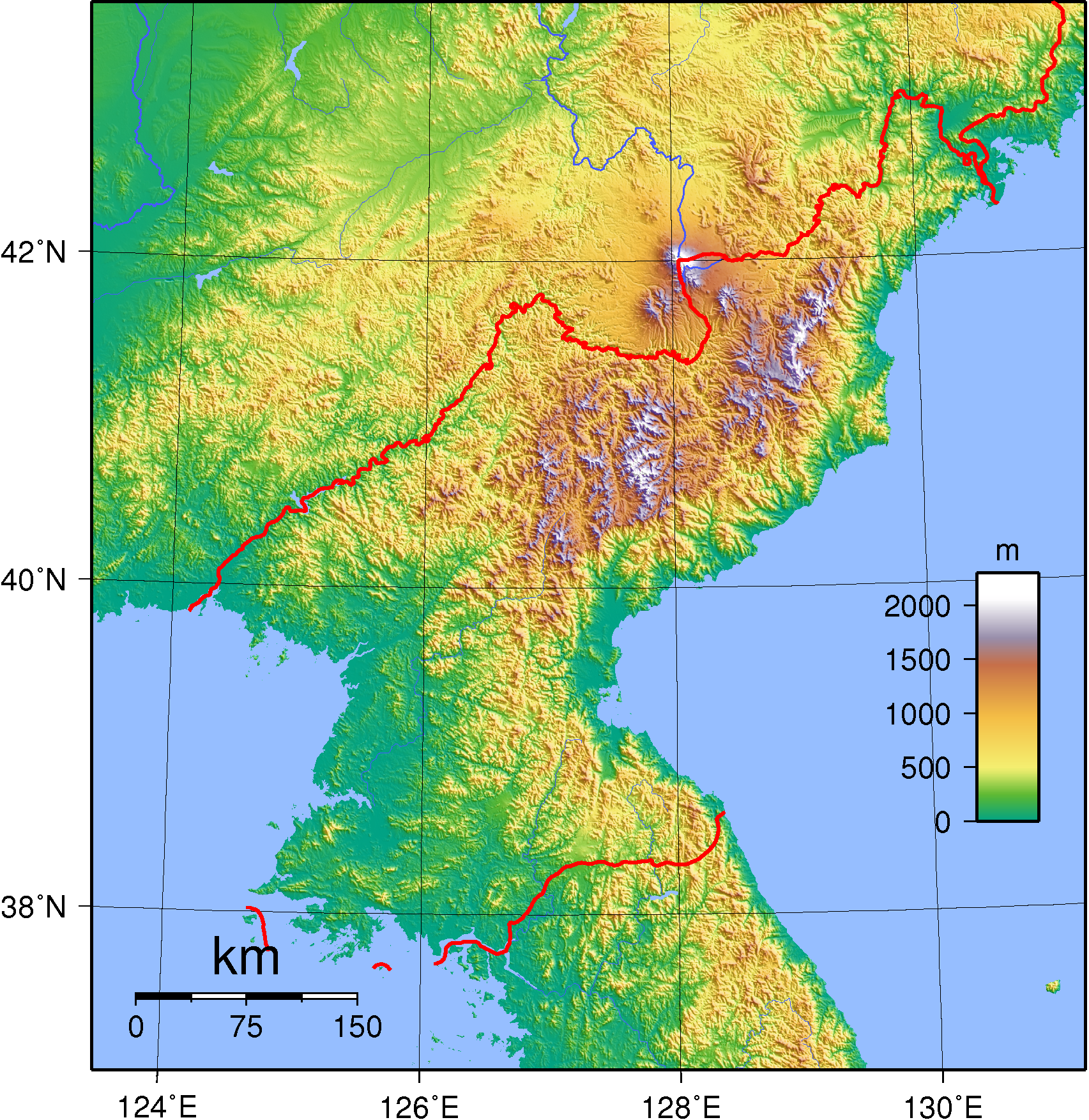
An enlargeable topographic map of North Korea

Geography of North Korea

- North Korea is: a country
- Location:
  - Northern Hemisphere and Eastern Hemisphere
  - Eurasia
    - Asia
      - East Asia
        - Korean Peninsula
  - Time zone: Pyongyang Time (UTC+09:00)
  - Extreme points of North Korea
    - High: Paektu-san 2,744 m (9,003 ft)
    - Low: Sea of Japan and Yellow Sea 0 m
  - Land boundaries: 1,673 km (1,040 mi)

China 1,416 km (880 mi)
South Korea 238 km (148 mi)
Russia 19 km (12 mi)

- Coastline: 2,495 km (1,550 mi)

- Population of North Korea: 23,790,000 – 55th most populous country
- Area of North Korea: 120,540 km^{2} (46,540 sq mi)
- Atlas of North Korea

=== Environment of North Korea ===
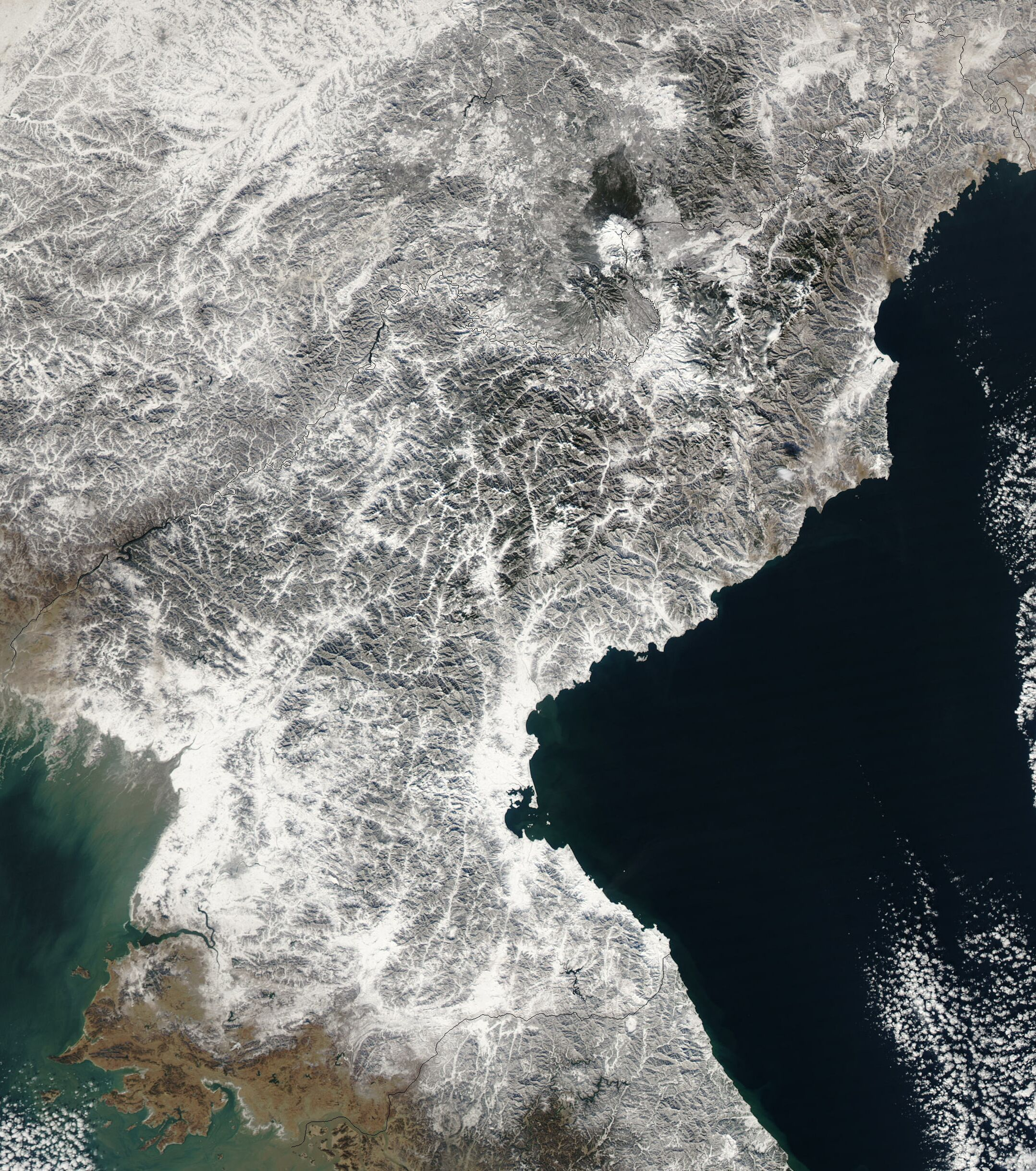
An enlargeable satellite image of North Korea

- Climate of North Korea
- Environment of North Korea
- Climate change in North Korea
- Wildlife of North Korea
  - Flora of North Korea
  - Fauna of North Korea
    - Birds of North Korea
    - Mammals of North Korea

==== Natural geographic features of North Korea ====
- Natural monuments of North Korea
- Islands of North Korea
- Lakes of North Korea
- Mountains of North Korea
  - Volcanoes in North Korea
- Rivers of North Korea
- Valleys of North Korea
- List of World Heritage Sites in North Korea

=== Regions of North Korea ===
Regions of North Korea

- China–North Korea border
- North Korea–Russia border

==== Administrative divisions of North Korea ====
Administrative divisions of North Korea

- First-level divisions
  - Second-level divisions
    - Third-level divisions

===== Provinces of North Korea =====
Provinces
Special Administrative Regions
Directly governed cities

Provinces of North Korea

- Chagang Province (Chagang-do; 자강도; 慈江道)
- North Hamgyŏng Province (Hamgyŏng-pukto; 함경 북도; 咸鏡北道)
- South Hamgyŏng Province (Hamgyŏng-namdo; 함경 남도; 咸鏡南道)
- North Hwanghae Province (Hwanghae-pukto; 황해 북도; 黃海北道)
- South Hwanghae Province (Hwanghae-namdo; 황해 남도; 黃海南道)
- Kangwŏn Province (Kangwŏndo; 강원도; 江原道)
- North P'yŏngan Province (P'yŏngan-pukto; 평안 북도; 平安北道)
- South P'yŏngan Province (P'yŏngan-namdo; 평안 남도; 平安南道)
- Ryanggang Province (Ryanggang-do; 량강도; 兩江道)1

Note:Sometimes also spelled as "Yanggang" in English.

- Kaesŏng Industrial Region (Kaesŏng Kongŏp Chigu; 개성 공업 지구; 開城工業地區)
- Mount Kumgang Tourist Region (Kŭmgangsan Kwan'gwang Chigu; 금강산 관광 지구; 金剛山觀光地區)
- Sinŭiju Special Administrative Region (Sinŭiju T'ŭkpyŏl Haengjŏnggu; 신의주 특별 행정구; 新義州特別行政區)
- P'yŏngyang (P'yŏngyang Chikhalsi; 평양 직할시; 平壤直轄市)
- Rasŏn (Rajin-Sŏnbong)(Rasŏn (Rajin-Sŏnbong) Chikhalsi; 라선 (라진-선봉) 직할시; 羅先 (羅津-先鋒) 直轄市)

===== Second-level administrative districts of North Korea, by province =====
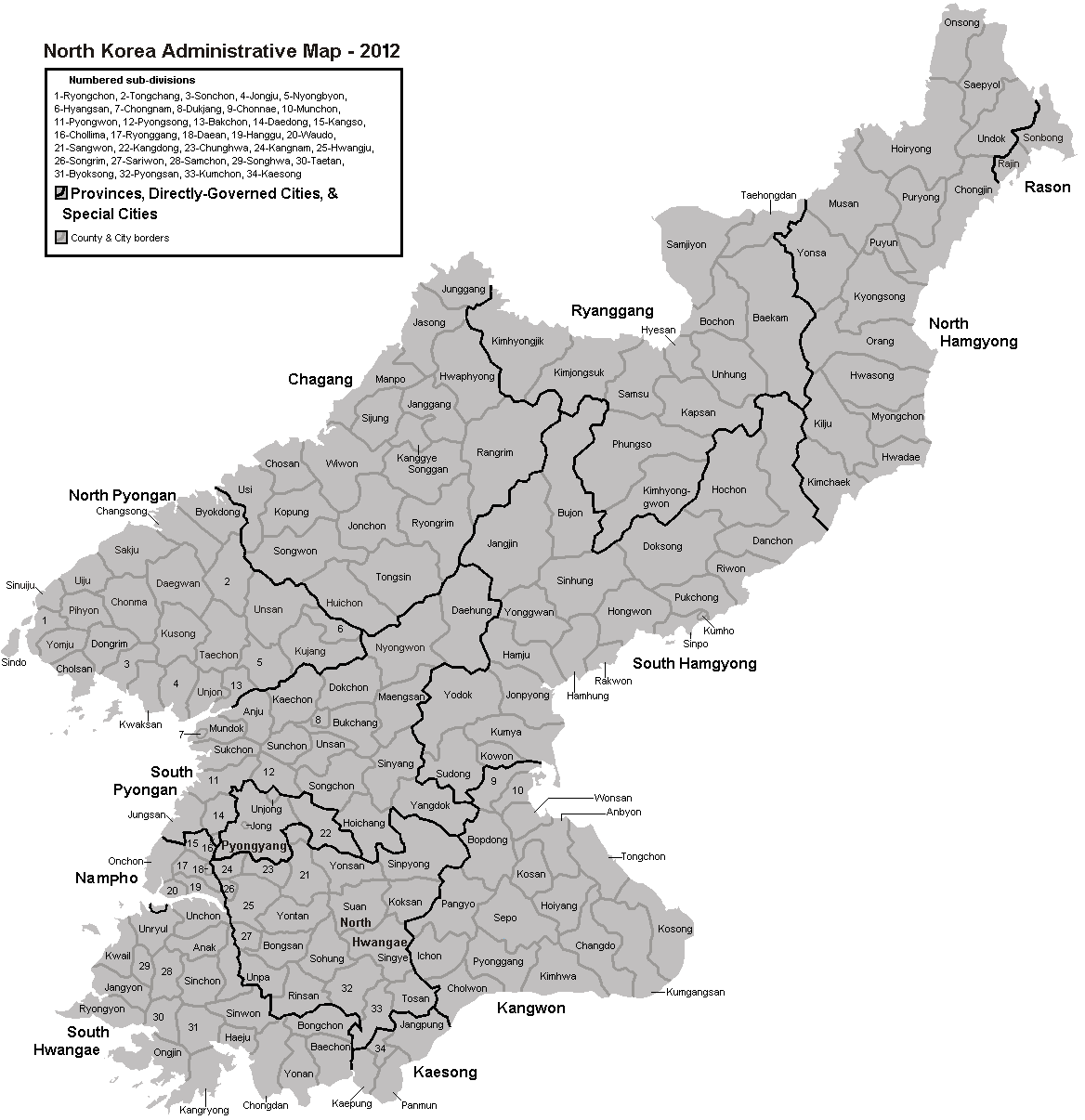
The second-level divisions of North Korea as of 2012

====== Pyongyang Directly Governed City ======
Pyongyang Directly Governed City

- 19 wards (guyok):
  - Chung-guyok
  - Pyongchon-guyok
  - Potonggang-guyok
  - Moranbong-guyok
  - Sosong-guyok
  - Songyo-guyok
  - Tongdaewon-guyok
  - Taedonggang-guyok
  - Sadong-guyok
  - Taesong-guyok
  - Mangyongdae-guyok
  - Hyongjesan-guyok
  - Ryongsong-guyok
  - Samsok-guyok
  - Ryokpo-guyok
  - Rangnang-guyok
  - Sunan-guyok
  - Unjong-guyok
  - Hwasong-guyok
- 2 counties (kun):
  - Kangdong
  - Kangnam County
- 1 neighbourhood
  - Panghyŏn-dong

====== Rason Special City ======
Rason Special City

- 2 ward (guyok):
- Rajin
- Sonbong

====== Chagang Province ======
Chagang Province

- 3 cities (si):
  - Kanggye
  - Huichon
  - Manpo
- 15 counties (kun):
  - Changgang County
  - Chasong County
  - Chonchon County
  - Chosan County
  - Chunggang County
  - Hwapyong County
  - Kopung County
  - Rangrim County
  - Ryongrim County
  - Sijung County
  - Songgan County
  - Songwon County
  - Tongsin County
  - Usi County
  - Wiwon County

====== North Hamgyŏng Province ======
North Hamgyong Province

- 3 cities (si):
  - Chongjin
  - Hoeryong
  - Kimchaek
- 12 counties (kun):
  - Myonggan County
  - Hwadae County
  - Kilju County
  - Kyongsong County
  - Musan County
  - Myongchon County
  - Onsong County
  - Orang County
  - Puryong County
  - Kyongwon County
  - Kyonghung County
  - Yonsa County

====== South Hamgyŏng Province ======
South Hamgyong Province

- 4 cities (si):
  - Hamhung
  - Hungnam
  - Sinpo
  - Tanchon
- 1 district (ku): Sudong
- 1 area (chigu): Kumho (North Korea)
- 15 counties (kun):
  - Changjin County
  - Chongpyong County
  - Hamju County
  - Hochon County
  - Hongwon County
  - Kowon County
  - Kumya County
  - Pujon County
  - Pukchong County
  - Ragwon County
  - Riwon County
  - Sinhung County
  - Toksong County
  - Yonggwang County
  - Yodok County

====== North Hwanghae Province ======
North Hwanghae Province

- 3 cities (si):
  - Sariwon
  - Kaesong (City with special status / Kaesong Industrial Region)
  - Songrim
- 19 counties (kun): Changpung County
  - Chunghwa County
  - Hwangju County
  - Kaepung County
  - Kangnam County
  - Koksan County
  - Kumchon County
  - Pongsan County
  - Pyongsan County
  - Rinsan County
  - Sangwon County
  - Singye County
  - Sinpyong County
  - Sohung County
  - Suan County
  - Tosan County
  - Unpa County
  - Yonsan County
  - Yontan County

====== South Hwanghae Province ======
South Hwanghae Province

- 1 city (si): Haeju
- 19 counties (kun):
  - Anak County
  - Chaeryong County
  - Changyon County
  - Chongdan County
  - Kangryong County
  - Kwail County
  - Ongjin County, South Hwanghae
  - Paechon County
  - Pongchon County
  - Pyoksong County
  - Ryongyon County
  - Samchon County
  - Sinchon County
  - Sinwon County
  - Songhwa County
  - Taetan County
  - Ullyul County
  - Unchon County
  - Yonan County

====== Kangwon Province ======
Kangwon Province (North Korea)

- 2 cities (si):
  - Munchon
  - Wonsan
- 1 special administrative region: Mount Kumgang Tourist Region
- 15 counties (kun):
  - Anbyon County
  - Changdo County
  - Chorwon County
  - Chonnae County
  - Hoeyang County
  - Ichon County
  - Kimhwa County
  - Kosan County
  - Kosong County
  - Kumgang County
  - Pangyo County
  - Poptong County
  - Pyonggang County
  - Sepo County
  - Tongchon County

====== North P'yŏngan Province ======
North Pyongan Province

- 3 cities (si):
  - Sinuiju
  - Chongju
  - Kusong
- 22 counties (kun):
  - Changsong County
  - Cholsan County
  - Chonma County
  - Hyangsan County
  - Kujang County
  - Kwaksan County
  - Nyongbyon County
  - Pakchon County
  - Pihyon County
  - Pyoktong County
  - Ryongchon County
  - Sakchu County
  - Sindo County
  - Sonchon County
  - Taechon County
  - Taegwan County
  - Tongchang County
  - Tongrim County
  - Uiju County
  - Unjon County
  - Unsan County
  - Yomju County

====== South P'yŏngan Province ======
South Pyongan Province

- 6 cities (si):
  - Pyongsong
  - Anju, South Pyongan
  - Kaechon
  - Nampo (City with special status)
  - Sunchon
  - Tokchon
- 1 district (ku): Chongnam
- 2 districts (chigu):
  - Tukchang
  - Ungok
- 16 counties (kun):
  - Chungsan County
  - Hoechang County
  - Maengsan County
  - Mundok County
  - Nyongwon County
  - Pukchang County
  - Pyongwon County
  - Sinyang County
  - Songchon County
  - Sukchon County
  - Taedong County
  - Taehung County
  - Unsan County, South Pyongan
  - Yangdok County

====== Ryanggang Province ======
Ryanggang Province

- 1 city (si): Hyesan
- 11 counties (kun):
  - Kapsan County
  - Kimjongsuk County
  - Kimhyonggwon County
  - Kimhyongjik County
  - Paegam County
  - Pochon County
  - Pungso County
  - Samjiyon County
  - Samsu County
  - Taehongdan County
  - Unhung County

===== Municipalities of North Korea =====
Municipalities of North Korea

- Capital of North Korea: Pyongyang
- Cities of North Korea
  - Special cities of North Korea

=== Demography of North Korea ===
Demographics of North Korea

- 1993 North Korea Census
- 2008 North Korea Census

== Government and politics of North Korea ==
Politics of North Korea

- Form of government:Unitary one-party socialist republic under a totalitarian hereditary dictatorship
- Capital of North Korea: Pyongyang
- North Korean abductions of Japanese citizens
- North Korean abductions of South Koreans
- Corruption in North Korea
- North Korean defectors
  - North Korean defectors in Thailand
  - List of North Korean defectors in South Korea
- Elections in North Korea
  - 1948 North Korean parliamentary election
  - 1957 North Korean parliamentary election
  - 1962 North Korean parliamentary election
  - 1967 North Korean parliamentary election
  - 1972 North Korean parliamentary election
  - 1977 North Korean parliamentary election
  - 1982 North Korean parliamentary election
  - 1986 North Korean parliamentary election
  - 1990 North Korean parliamentary election
  - 1998 North Korean parliamentary election
  - 2003 North Korean parliamentary election
  - 2009 North Korean parliamentary election
  - 2014 North Korean parliamentary election
  - 2019 North Korean parliamentary election
- North Korea's illicit activities
- Mass surveillance in North Korea
- Political parties in North Korea
  - Workers' Party of North Korea
    - 1st Central Committee of the Workers' Party of North Korea
    - 1st Central Inspection Commission of the Workers' Party of North Korea
    - 1st Congress of the Workers' Party of North Korea
    - 2nd Congress of the Workers' Party of North Korea
- Propaganda in North Korea

=== Branches of the government of North Korea ===
Government of North Korea

==== Executive branch of the government of North Korea ====
- Head of state: Chairman of the State Affairs Commission
- Head of government: Premier of North Korea
- Residences of North Korean leaders
- North Korean leaders' trains
- Cabinet of North Korea
  - Minister of Foreign Affairs (North Korea)
- Departments of the government of North Korea
  - Ministry of Post and Telecommunications (North Korea)

==== Legislative branch of the government of North Korea ====
- Parliament of North Korea (unicameral)

==== Judicial branch of the government of North Korea ====
- Judiciary of North Korea

=== Foreign relations of North Korea ===
Foreign relations of North Korea

- Diplomatic missions in North Korea
- Diplomatic missions of North Korea
  - Embassy of North Korea in Moscow
  - Embassy of North Korea, London
- North Korea–South Korea relations
- Australia–North Korea relations
- Botswana–North Korea relations
- Brazil–North Korea relations
- Burkina Faso–North Korea relations
- Burundi–North Korea relations
- Cambodia–North Korea relations
- Canada–North Korea relations
- Central African Republic–North Korea relations
- China–North Korea relations
- Comoros–North Korea relations
- Denmark–North Korea relations
- Equatorial Guinea–North Korea relations
- Foreign relations of North Korea
- France–North Korea relations
- Germany–North Korea relations
- Grenada–North Korea relations
- Guinea-Bissau–North Korea relations
- Hong Kong–North Korea relations
- Hungary–North Korea relations
- Iceland–North Korea relations
- India–North Korea relations
- Indonesia–North Korea relations
- Iran–North Korea relations
- Israel–North Korea relations
- Italy–North Korea relations
- Japan–North Korea relations
- Kenya–North Korea relations
- Malaysia–North Korea relations
- Mauritania–North Korea relations
- Mongolia–North Korea relations
- Namibia–North Korea relations
- New Zealand–North Korea relations
- North Korea–Norway relations
- North Korea–Pakistan relations
- North Korea–Palestine relations
- North Korea–Philippines relations
- North Korea–Poland relations
- North Korea–Russia relations
- North Korea–Rwanda relations
- North Korea–Serbia relations
- North Korea–Seychelles relations
- North Korea–Singapore relations
- North Korea–Somalia relations
- North Korea–Tanzania relations
- North Korea–Togo relations
- North Korea–United Kingdom relations
- North Korea–United States relations
  - CIA activities in North Korea
- North Korea–Vietnam relations
- The Gambia–North Korea relations

==== International organization membership ====
The Democratic People's Republic of Korea is a member of:

- Association of Southeast Asian Nations Regional Forum (ARF)
- Food and Agriculture Organization (FAO)
- Group of 77 (G77)
- International Civil Aviation Organization (ICAO)
- International Federation of Red Cross and Red Crescent Societies (IFRCS)
- International Fund for Agricultural Development (IFAD)
- International Hydrographic Organization (IHO)
- International Maritime Organization (IMO)
- International Olympic Committee (IOC)
- International Organization for Standardization (ISO)
- International Red Cross and Red Crescent Movement (ICRM)
- International Telecommunication Union (ITU)
- International Telecommunications Satellite Organization (ITSO)
- Inter-Parliamentary Union (IPU)
- Nonaligned Movement (NAM)
- United Nations (UN)
- United Nations Conference on Trade and Development (UNCTAD)
- United Nations Educational, Scientific, and Cultural Organization (UNESCO)
- United Nations Industrial Development Organization (UNIDO)
- Universal Postal Union (UPU)
- World Federation of Trade Unions (WFTU)
- World Health Organization (WHO)
- World Intellectual Property Organization (WIPO)
- World Meteorological Organization (WMO)
- World Tourism Organization (UNWTO)

North Korea is one of only seven U.N. members which is not a member of the Organisation for the Prohibition of Chemical Weapons.

=== Law and order in North Korea ===
Law of North Korea

- Cannabis in North Korea
- Capital punishment in North Korea
- Citizenship in North Korea
- Constitution of North Korea
- Copyright law of North Korea
- Crime in North Korea
- Human rights in North Korea
  - Censorship in North Korea
  - Human experimentation in North Korea
  - Human trafficking in North Korea
  - LGBT rights in North Korea
  - Freedom of religion in North Korea
  - Mass surveillance in North Korea
- Taxation in North Korea
- Law enforcement in North Korea
  - Prisons in North Korea
- Visa policy of North Korea
  - Visa requirements for North Korean citizens

=== Military of North Korea ===
Military of North Korea

- Command
  - Commander-in-chief
    - Central Military Commission
    - Ministry of Defence of North Korea
- Forces
  - Army of North Korea
    - 105th Armored Division (North Korea)
    - 1st Division (North Korea)
    - 3rd Division (North Korea)
    - 6th Division (North Korea)
    - I Corps (North Korea)
    - II Corps (North Korea)
    - III Corps (North Korea)
    - IV Corps (North Korea)
    - V Corps (North Korea)
    - XII Corps (North Korea)
    - Tanks of North Korea
  - Navy of North Korea
  - Air Force of North Korea
- Military history of North Korea
- Military ranks of North Korea

=== Local government in North Korea ===
Local government in North Korea

- 1946 North Korean local elections
- 1947 North Korean local elections
- 1949 North Korean local elections
- 1956 North Korean local elections
- 1959 North Korean local elections
- 1963 North Korean local elections
- 1967 North Korean local elections
- 1972 North Korean local elections
- 1975 North Korean local elections
- 1977 North Korean local elections
- 1979 North Korean local elections
- 1981 North Korean local elections
- 1983 North Korean local elections
- 1985 North Korean local elections
- 1987 North Korean local elections
- 1989 North Korean local elections
- 1991 North Korean local elections
- 1993 North Korean local elections
- 1999 North Korean local elections
- 2003 North Korean local elections
- 2007 North Korean local elections
- 2011 North Korean local elections
- 2015 North Korean local elections
- 2019 North Korean local elections

== History of North Korea ==
History of North Korea

- Military history of North Korea

=== History of North Korea, by period ===
- History of Korea
  - Korea under Japanese rule – Japan endeavored to integrate Korea into its empire, exploiting its resources and its people
  - Surrender of Japan – marked the end of World War II, and the end of Japanese occupation of Korea
  - Division of Korea – at the end of World War II, the Soviets and Americans occupied Korea, dividing the region at the 38th parallel. Two governments emerged, one in the North, and another in the South, both claiming sovereignty over the whole of Korea. This led to the...
- Kim dynasty
  - North Korean cult of personality
  - Kim Il Sung (ruled from 1948 to 1994)
  - Korean conflict – conflict that began with the division of Korea and continues to the present day
    - Korean War – war that began when North Korea invaded South Korea.
      - Korean Armistice Agreement – document that ended the Korean War. However, no peace treaty followed, so North and South Korea are technically still at war.
      - Korean Demilitarized Zone (DMZ) – strip of land running across the Korean Peninsula. It was established at the end of the Korean War to serve as a buffer zone between North and South Korea.
      - Korean War POWs detained in North Korea
    - Korean DMZ Conflict (1966–69)
    - Death and state funeral of Kim Il Sung
  - Kim Jong Il (ruled from 1994 to 2011)
  - Kim Jong Un (ruled from 2011 to present)
    - 2018–19 Korean peace process
      - Peace Treaty on Korean Peninsula

==== History of North Korea, by year ====
List of years in North Korea 1948 1949 1950
1951 1952 1953 1954 1955 1956 1957 1958 1959 1960
1961 1962 1963 1964 1965 1966 1967 1968 1969 1970
1971 1972 1973 1974 1975 1976 1977 1978 1979 1980
1981 1982 1983 1984 1985 1986 1987 1988 1989 1990
1991 1992 1993 1994 1995 1996 1997 1998 1999 2000
2001 2002 2003 2004 2005 2006 2007 2008 2009 2010
2011 2012 2013 2014 2015 2016

=== History of Korea, by subject ===
- North Korea flooding
  - 2006 North Korean floods
  - 2007 North Korean floods
  - 2012 North Korean floods
- Massacres in North Korea
- Military history of North Korea
  - Historical military units
    - 2nd Division (North Korea)
    - 4th Division (North Korea)
    - 5th Division (North Korea)
    - 8th Division (North Korea)
    - 9th Division (North Korea)
    - 10th Division (North Korea)
    - 12th Division (North Korea)
    - 13th Division (North Korea)
    - 15th Division (North Korea)
    - 18th Division (North Korea)
    - 19th Division (North Korea)
    - 27th Division (North Korea)
    - 43rd Division (North Korea)
    - 25th Infantry Brigade (North Korea)
    - 766th Independent Infantry Regiment (North Korea)
    - 78th Independent Infantry Regiment (North Korea)
  - North Korea and weapons of mass destruction
    - Timeline of the North Korean nuclear program
      - Missile tests
        - 1993
        - 2006
        - 2009
          - more
        - 2013
        - 2014
        - 2016
      - Nuclear tests
        - 2006 (reactions)
        - 2009 (reactions)
        - 2013 (reactions)
        - January 2016 (reactions)

== Culture of North Korea ==
Culture of North Korea

- Architecture of North Korea
- Cuisine of North Korea
  - List of North Korean dishes
- Cultural assets of North Korea
- Languages of North Korea
  - North Korean standard language
  - North Korean Russian
- Media in North Korea
- National symbols of North Korea
  - Emblem of North Korea
  - Flag of North Korea
  - National anthem of North Korea
- Prostitution in North Korea
- Public holidays in North Korea
- Religion in North Korea
  - Buddhism in North Korea
  - Christianity in North Korea
    - Roman Catholicism in North Korea
  - Hinduism in North Korea
  - Islam in North Korea
- List of museums in North Korea
- List of World Heritage Sites in North Korea

=== Art in North Korea ===
- Art in North Korea
- Cinema of North Korea
- Literature of North Korea
- Music of North Korea
- * Smoking in North Korea
- North Korean films
- North Korean literature
- List of North Korean actors
- List of North Korean films
- List of North Korean flags
- List of North Korean football champions
- List of North Korean musicians
- List of North Korean operas
- List of North Korean records in athletics
- List of North Korean television series
- Television in North Korea
- Theatre in North Korea
  - List of theatres in North Korea

=== People of North Korea ===
People of North Korea

- Koreans
- North Korean diaspora
  - North Koreans in Russia
  - North Koreans in South Korea
- Ethnic groups in North Korea
  - Americans in North Korea
  - Chinese North Korean
  - French North Korean
  - German North Korean
  - Japanese North Korean
  - Japanese people in North Korea
- Women in North Korea

=== Sports in North Korea ===
Sport in North Korea

- Football in North Korea
  - North Korea at the FIFA World Cup
  - North Korea national football team
  - North Korea national under-17 football team
  - North Korea national under-20 football team
  - North Korea national under-23 football team
  - North Korea women's national football team
  - North Korea women's national under-17 football team
  - North Korea women's national under-20 football team
  - 2010 North Korea national football team results
  - 2011 North Korea national football team results
  - 2012 North Korea national football team results
  - 2009 North Korea national football team results
  - List of football clubs in North Korea
  - List of football stadiums in North Korea
  - North Korea–South Korea football rivalry
- Ice hockey in North Korea
  - North Korea men's national ice hockey team
  - North Korea men's national junior ice hockey team
  - North Korea men's national under-18 ice hockey team
  - North Korea women's national ice hockey team
- North Korea at the Asian Games
  - North Korea at the 1974 Asian Games
  - North Korea at the 1982 Asian Games
  - North Korea at the 1998 Asian Games
  - North Korea at the 2002 Asian Games
  - North Korea at the 2006 Asian Games
  - North Korea at the 2007 Asian Winter Games
  - North Korea at the 2009 Asian Indoor Games
  - North Korea at the 2010 Asian Games
  - North Korea at the 2011 Asian Winter Games
  - North Korea at the 2014 Asian Games
  - North Korea at the Olympics
  - North Korea at the 1964 Winter Olympics
  - North Korea at the 1972 Summer Olympics
  - North Korea at the 1972 Winter Olympics
  - North Korea at the 1976 Summer Olympics
  - North Korea at the 1980 Summer Olympics
  - North Korea at the 1984 Winter Olympics
  - North Korea at the 1988 Winter Olympics
  - North Korea at the 1992 Summer Olympics
  - North Korea at the 1992 Winter Olympics
  - North Korea at the 1996 Summer Olympics
  - North Korea at the 1998 Winter Olympics
  - North Korea at the 2000 Summer Olympics
  - North Korea at the 2004 Summer Olympics
  - North Korea at the 2006 Winter Olympics
  - North Korea at the 2008 Summer Olympics
  - North Korea at the 2010 Winter Olympics
  - North Korea at the 2012 Summer Olympics
  - North Korea at the 2016 Summer Olympics
- North Korea at the Paralympics
  - North Korea at the 2012 Summer Paralympics
  - North Korea at the 2016 Summer Paralympics
- North Korea at the 2009 East Asian Games
- North Korea at the 2009 World Championships in Athletics
- North Korea at the 2010 Summer Youth Olympics
- North Korea at the 2011 World Aquatics Championships
- North Korea at the 2013 World Aquatics Championships
- North Korea at the 2015 World Aquatics Championships
- North Korea at the 2013 World Championships in Athletics
- North Korea at the 2014 Summer Youth Olympics
- North Korea at the 2015 World Championships in Athletics
- Volleyball in North Korea
  - North Korea women's national volleyball team
- North Korea national amateur boxing athletes
- North Korea national baseball team
- North Korea national basketball team
- North Korea national under-17 basketball team
- North Korea women's national basketball team
- North Korea women's national handball team
- North Korea women's national softball team
- North Korea women's national under-19 basketball team
- North Korean records in Olympic weightlifting
- North Korean Championship (ice hockey)
- North Korean Figure Skating Championships

== Economy and infrastructure of North Korea ==
Economy of North Korea

- Economic rank, by nominal GDP (2007): 155th (one hundred and fifty fifth)
- Agriculture in North Korea
  - Potato production in North Korea
- Banking in North Korea
  - National Bank of North Korea
  - List of banks in North Korea
- Companies of North Korea
- Currency of North Korea: Won
  - ISO 4217: KPW
- Defense industry of North Korea
- Energy in North Korea
  - Nuclear power in North Korea
- Health care in North Korea
- Mining in North Korea
- Poverty in North Korea
- Shadow economy of North Korea
- Taxation in North Korea
- Tourism in North Korea
- List of amusement parks in North Korea

=== Communications in North Korea ===
Communications in North Korea

- North Korean postal service
  - Postage stamps and postal history of North Korea
- Telecommunications in North Korea
  - Internet in North Korea
  - Telephone numbers in North Korea
- Media of North Korea
  - List of magazines in North Korea
  - List of newspapers in North Korea
  - List of radio stations in North Korea

=== Transport in North Korea ===
Transport in North Korea

- List of highway airstrips in North Korea
- Airports in North Korea
- Rail transport in North Korea
  - List of railway stations in North Korea
  - Railway lines in North Korea
- Vehicular transport in North Korea
  - Automotive industry in North Korea
  - Bridges in North Korea
  - Vehicle registration plates of North Korea
  - Roads in North Korea
  - Trams and trolleybuses in North Korea

== Education in North Korea ==
Education in North Korea

- List of universities in North Korea

== Health in North Korea ==
Health in North Korea

- Disability in North Korea
- HIV/AIDS in North Korea

== Bibliographies ==
Bibliography of North Korea

== See also ==
North Korea

- List of international rankings
- Member state of the United Nations
- Outline of Asia
- Outline of geography
- Outline of South Korea
- 2008 New York Philharmonic visit to North Korea
- 2009 imprisonment of American journalists by North Korea
- Active North Korean ships
- Ambassadors from China to North Korea
- Ambassadors of Russia to North Korea
- Ambassadors of the United Kingdom to North Korea
- Australian Ambassadors to North Korea
- Border incidents involving North Korea
- Diplomatic missions of North Korea
- Flag bearers for North Korea at the Olympics
- Foreign nationals detained in North Korea
- Heads of state of North Korea
- Hotels in North Korea
- Leaders of North Korea
- Media coverage of North Korea
- North Korean merchant ships
- North Korean occupation of South Korea, June to September, 1950
- North Korean support for Iran during the Iran–Iraq war
- North Korean websites banned in South Korea
- Prime Ministers of North Korea
- United Nations Security Council resolutions concerning North Korea
- United States Special Representative for North Korea Policy
- International Coalition to Stop Crimes Against Humanity in North Korea
- Iran North Korea Syria Nonproliferation Act
- Japan–North Korea Pyongyang Declaration
- National Treasure (North Korea)
- North Hamgyeong Province (Republic of Korea)
- North Pyeongan Province (Republic of Korea)
- North–South differences in the Korean language
- Order of Friendship (North Korea)
- Orders and medals of North Korea
- U.S. Committee for Human Rights in North Korea
- North Korea Sanctions Enforcement Act of 2013
- North Korean Human Rights Act of 2004
- North Korean studies
