= 1959 in Korea =

1959 in Korea may refer to:

- 1959 in North Korea
- 1959 in South Korea
