= 1960 in Korea =

1960 in Korea may refer to:

- 1960 in North Korea
- 1960 in South Korea
