= 1962 in Korea =

1961 in Korea may refer to:

- 1961 in North Korea
- 1961 in South Korea
