= 1963 in Korea =

1963 in Korea may refer to:

- 1963 in North Korea
- 1963 in South Korea
