= 1964 in Korea =

1964 in Korea may refer to:

- 1964 in North Korea
- 1964 in South Korea
