= 1970 in Korea =

1970 in Korea may refer to:

- 1970 in North Korea
- 1970 in South Korea
