= 1971 in Korea =

1971 in Korea may refer to:

- 1971 in North Korea
- 1971 in South Korea
