= 1968 in Korea =

1968 in Korea may refer to:

- 1968 in North Korea
- 1968 in South Korea
