= 1960 in South Korea =

- Centuries: 20th; 21st
- Decades: 1940s; 1950s; 1960s; 1970s; 1980s
- See also: Other events in 1960; Years in South Korea; Timeline of Korean history 1960 in North Korea

Events from the year 1960 in South Korea.

== Incumbents ==
- President: Rhee Syng-man (until 26 April), Yun Posun (starting 12 August)
- Vice President: Chang Myon (until 23 April), Yun Posun (23 April-26 April)
- Prime Minister: Heo Jeong (15 June-18 August)

== Events ==
- 26 January – According to National Police Agency of ROK official confirmed report, a human stampede by Lunar New Year rush in Seoul Station, total 31 persons were crush to death, 40 persons were hurt.
- 2 March – According to South Korea Fire Service official confirmed report, a fire and explosion in Kukje Rubber and Manufacturing plant in Busan, 68 persons were fatalities.
- 19 April - April Revolution
- 5 September – Samyang Tires, as predecessor of Kumho Tires has founded.

=== Full date unknown ===
- Kim Yong-kap is the South Korean Deputy Minister of Finance.

== Births ==
- 6 April - Kim Kyu-chul, actor
- 3 June - Kim Hyun-jun, basketball player (died 1999)
- 11 October - Kim Byeong-ok, actor
- 25 October – Hong Sang-soo, film director.
- 9 November - Seo Hajin, writer.
- 18 December - Yoon Suk Yeol, lawyer and politician, president of South Korea.
- 20 December - Kim Ki-duk, film director (died 2020).

== Deaths ==
- 15 February - Chough Pyung-ok, politician
- 28 April - Lee Ki-poong, politician and vice president.
- April - Kim Ju-yul
- 16 October - Hyun Jae-myung.

== See also ==
- List of South Korean films of 1960
- Years in Japan
- Years in North Korea
