= 1965 in Korea =

1965 in Korea may refer to:

- 1965 in North Korea
- 1965 in South Korea
