= 1953 in Korea =

1953 in Korea may refer to:

- 1953 in North Korea
- 1953 in South Korea
