= 1966 in Korea =

1966 in Korea may refer to:

- 1966 in North Korea
- 1966 in South Korea
