= 1969 in Korea =

1969 in Korea may refer to:

- 1969 in North Korea
- 1969 in South Korea
