= 1967 in Korea =

1967 in Korea may refer to:

- 1967 in North Korea
- 1967 in South Korea
