= 1953 in South Korea =

- Centuries: 20th; 21st
- Decades: 1940s; 1950s; 1960s; 1970s
- See also: Other events in 1953; Years in South Korea; Timeline of Korean history 1953 in North Korea

Events from the year 1953 in South Korea.

== Incumbents ==
- President: Rhee Syng-man
- Vice President: Ham Tae-young
- Prime Minister: Paik Too-chin (until 24 April), Paik Too-chin (starting 24 April)

== Events ==
- 9 January – According to South Korea's Coast Guard official confirmed report, a passenger ferry Changgyeong-ho capsized off the coast of Busan, and 229 persons perished.
- 1 August – Cheil Jedang (now CJ CheilJedang), a food manufacturer, was founded.
- The Korea Herald newspaper was founded.
- 1 October – The Mutual Defense Treaty (United States–South Korea) was signed,

== Births ==
- 18 January - Chon Song-Cha.
- 22 January - Myung-whun Chung, Korean conductor and pianist
- 24 January - Moon Jae-in, former South Korean president
- 29 January - Hwang Woo-suk, veterinarian
- 25 February -Kim Yeong-cheol, South Korean actor
- 10 March - Cho Hun-hyun. Go (game) player.
- 5 April - Tae Jin-ah, South Korean singer
- 22 May - Cha Bum-kun, former football manager and player
- 28 May - Moon Sung-keun, Korean actor
- 27 July - Chung Dong-young, Korean politician
- 18 August - Bae Cheol-soo, Korean musician and radio host
- 28 October - Park Yeong-gyu, Korean actor
- 13 December - Dokgo Young-jae, Korean actor
- Kim Byung-jong, South Korean painter

== Death ==
- 17 April - Yi Si-yeong, Korean independence activist

== See also ==
- List of South Korean films of 1953
- Years in Japan
- Years in North Korea
