= 1954 in South Korea =

- Centuries: 20th; 21st
- Decades: 1940s; 1950s; 1960s; 1970s
- See also: Other events in 1954; Years in South Korea; Timeline of Korean history 1954 in North Korea

Events from the year 1954 in South Korea.

== Incumbents ==
- President: Rhee Syng-man
- Vice President: Ham Tae-young
- Prime Minister: Paik Too-chin (until 17 June), Pyon Yong-tae (28 June-28 November)

== Events ==
=== February ===
- February 16 – After honeymooning with Joe DiMaggio in Japan, actress Marilyn Monroe performs ten USO shows in four days for American soldiers, airmen, Marines and sailors in Korea.

== Births ==
- Hi Kyung Kim.
- 22 February-Kim Chang-wan
- 4 September-Jeon In-kwon
- 27 September - Hyun In-taek.
- 15 October - Lim Chulwoo.
- 3 December - Yang Hee-kyung.
- Lee Chang-dong-Korean film director and novelist

== See also ==
- List of South Korean films of 1954
- Years in Japan
- Years in North Korea
