= List of years in Korea =

List of years in Korea may refer to:

- List of years in North Korea
- List of years in South Korea

== See also ==
- Timeline of Korean history
