= 1956 in Korea =

1956 in Korea may refer to:

- 1956 in North Korea
- 1956 in South Korea
