= 1955 in Korea =

1955 in Korea may refer to:

- 1955 in North Korea
- 1955 in South Korea
