= 1954 in Korea =

1954 in Korea may refer to:

- 1954 in North Korea
- 1954 in South Korea
