= 1957 in Korea =

1957 in Korea may refer to:

- 1957 in North Korea
- 1957 in South Korea
