= 1971 in South Korea =

- Centuries: 20th; 21st
- Decades: 1950s; 1960s; 1970s; 1980s; 1990s
- See also: Other events in 1971; Years in South Korea; Timeline of Korean history 1971 in North Korea

Events from the year 1971 in South Korea.

== Incumbents ==
- President: Park Chung-hee
- Prime Minister: Chung Il-kwon (until 4 June), Kim Jong-pil (starting 4 June)

== Events ==
- January 18 – A South Korean marine kills 6 people in a mass shooting in Kimpo.
- April 27 – Presidential election, Park Chung-hee reelected.
- December 25 – Daeyeonggak Hotel fire, according to official confirmed report, 164 fatalities in Jung-gu, Seoul.

== Births ==
- January 30 - Lee Seo-jin, actor and television host
- January 31 - Lee Young-ae, actress
- February 17 - Shin Dong-yup
- April 5 - Kim Soo-nyung, archer
- August 27 - Kyung Lah, journalist
- September 10 - Yun Young-sook, archer
- October 18 - Yoo Sang-chul, football player and manager. (d. 2021)

== See also ==
- List of South Korean films of 1971
- Years in Japan
- Years in North Korea
