= 1964 in South Korea =

- Centuries: 20th; 21st
- Decades: 1940s; 1950s; 1960s; 1970s; 1980s
- See also: Other events in 1964; Years in South Korea; Timeline of Korean history 1964 in North Korea

Events from the year 1964 in South Korea.

== Incumbents ==
- President: Park Chung-hee
- Prime Minister: Choi Tu-son (until 10 May), Chung Il-kwon (starting 10 May)

== Events ==
- June 3 - June 3 Resistance movement

== Births ==
- 22 January – Kim Kwang-seok, singer (d. 1996).
- 5 February - Ha Seung-moo, poet, pastor and historical theologian.
- 13 May - Bae Jong-ok.
- 10 July – Eom Yeong-seop, cyclist.
- 9 December - Hyeon Taeghwan.
- 22 December - Lee Jae-myung, politician.
- Undated
  - Chung Hyung-min, biotechnology professor.

== Deaths ==
- January 13 - Kim Byung-ro

== See also ==
- List of South Korean films of 1964
- Years in Japan
- Years in North Korea
