= 1958 in Korea =

1958 in Korea may refer to:

- 1958 in North Korea
- 1958 in South Korea
