= 1970 in South Korea =

- Centuries: 20th; 21st
- Decades: 1950s; 1960s; 1970s; 1980s; 1990s
- See also: Other events in 1970; Years in South Korea; Timeline of Korean history 1970 in North Korea

Events from the year 1970 in South Korea.

== Incumbents ==
- President: Park Chung-hee
- Prime Minister: Chung Il-kwon (until 20 December), Paik Too-chin (starting 20 December)

== Events ==
- October 14 – 1970 Onyang-dong level crossing accident, according to MLIT of ROK official announced, 42 persons fatalities in Chungcheongnam-do.
- December 14 – Sinking of Namyoung-Ho, according to Coast Guard of ROK, official announced, 326 persons were fatalities, only seven persons were rescued.

== Births ==
- April 8 - Kim Byung-ji, footballer
- April 18 - Kim Kyung-Wook, archer
- July 16 - Wang Hee-kyung, archer
- September 13 - Kim Sun-il, interpreter and Christian missionary (d. 2004)
- December 27 - Kim Byung-chan, weightlifter (d.2015)

== Deaths ==
- November 13 - Jeon Tae-il, workers' rights activist (b. 1948)

== See also ==
- List of South Korean films of 1970
- Years in Japan
- Years in North Korea
