= 1965 in South Korea =

- Centuries: 20th; 21st
- Decades: 1940s; 1950s; 1960s; 1970s; 1980s
- See also: Other events in 1965; Years in South Korea; Timeline of Korean history 1965 in North Korea

Events from the year 1965 in South Korea.

== Incumbents ==
- President: Park Chung-hee
- Prime Minister: Chung Il-kwon

== Births ==
- 24 January – Kim Sung-moon, wrestler
- 14 August – Moon Kyung-ja
- 25 December – Sung Jung-a

== Deaths ==
- 19 July – Syngman Rhee

== See also ==
- List of South Korean films of 1965
- Years in Japan
- Years in North Korea
