= Outline of Korea =

Outline of Korea can refer to:

- Outline of North Korea
- Outline of South Korea
