= 1966 in South Korea =

- Centuries: 20th; 21st
- Decades: 1940s; 1950s; 1960s; 1970s; 1980s
- See also: Other events in 1966; Years in South Korea; Timeline of Korean history 1966 in North Korea

Events from the year 1966 in South Korea.

== Incumbents ==
- President: Park Chung Hee
- Prime Minister: Chung Il-kwon

== Events ==
The Second Korean Conflict, also referred to as the Korean DMZ Conflict, was a low intensity conflict between North Korean, South Korean, and United States forces. The conflict mainly occurred between 1966 and 1969 along the Korean DMZ.

Following the Korean War, both North Korea (Democratic People's Republic of Korea) and South Korea (Republic of Korea) were developing plans for reunification. Neither country was ready, nor willing, to accept the other's plan and relinquish control of their country. This contributed to growing tensions between North Korea and South Korea.

North Korean Premier Kim Il Sung planned to strengthen and increase the North Korean People's Army (NKPA) by 1967. Kim's plan is thought to be inspired by the war between North Vietnam and South Vietnam. The main objective of this plan was to infiltrate South Korea to enlist sympathizers who would then commit acts of sabotage, gather intelligence, and cause civil unrest among the citizens of South Korea. North Korea would provide the arms, training, and troops needed. Kim would then wait for American troops to pull out of the country and for the South Korean government to be destabilized.

In 1966, South Korean President, Park Chung Hee, increased tensions between North Korea and South Korea by increasing diplomatic ties with other countries. South Korea hosted a meeting to organize and create The Asian and Pacific Council. The council met in Seoul, South Korea on June 14–16, 1966 and helped establish the ROK as a rising Asian power. One month later, Park signed the Status of Forces Agreement, allowing the United States military to legally operate in South Korea and establish bases in the country.

With the Vietnam War happening at the same time, Kim Il-Sung believed the American troops to be easily defeated by the NPKA. This led him to broadcast a radio message on October 5, 1966, stating his intentions to launch an attack against the South Korean and American forces. Kim stated that “the unification of both Koreas was the greatest national task” following that “U.S. occupation and its colonial rule over South Korea is the root of all misfortunes and sufferings the South Korean people are undergoing”.

In mid-October, President Park sent 46,000 South Korean combat troops to aid with the war in Vietnam, dividing ROK forces for the first time since 1953.. Among these troops were three main divisions: the 25th “Tiger” and 9th “White Horse” infantry divisions, and the “Blue Dragon” marine unit. With three less units for the NKPA to fight, Kim Il-Sung moved forward with his attack plans.

On November 2, 1966, the NKPA ambushed a 2nd division United States patrol unit 1 km south of the DMZ. Six American soldiers were killed in the attack and one GI survived by pretending to be dead. The next attack happened about three months later in 1967, having been pushed back due to severe winter weather. These events started a significant escalation of hostilities between North Korea, South Korea, and the United States. These hostilities lasted 3 years and made up what is known as “The Second Korean Conflict”.

== Births ==
- Mi-Jung Lee.
- 23 October - Heung Jin Moon.

== See also ==
- List of South Korean films of 1966
- Years in Japan
- Years in North Korea
