= 1969 in South Korea =

- Centuries: 20th; 21st
- Decades: 1940s; 1950s; 1960s; 1970s; 1980s
- See also: Other events in 1969; Years in South Korea; Timeline of Korean history 1969 in North Korea

Events from the year 1969 in South Korea.

== Incumbents ==
- President: Park Chung-hee
- Prime Minister: Chung Il-kwon

== Events ==
- August 8 – MBC Television officially launched service to nationwide.
- December 3 – End of Korean DMZ Conflict
- December 11 – Korean Air Lines YS-11 hijacking

== Births ==
- 16 May - Kim Wan-sun, pop singer and dancer
- 8 August - Song Sung-il, Greco-Roman wrestler (d. 1995)
- 14 September - Bong Joon-ho, director and screenwriter
- 29 September - Cho Youn-jeong, archer
- 6 October - Hyun Jung-hwa, table tennis player

== See also ==
- List of South Korean films of 1969
- Years in Japan
- Years in North Korea
