= 1967 in South Korea =

- Centuries: 20th; 21st
- Decades: 1940s; 1950s; 1960s; 1970s; 1980s
- See also: Other events in 1967; Years in South Korea; Timeline of Korean history 1967 in North Korea

Events from the year 1967 in South Korea.

== Incumbents ==
- President: Park Chung-hee
- Prime Minister: Chung Il-kwon

== Births ==
- 27 April - Sung Dong-il, actor
- 8 July - Seo Hyang-soon, archer
- 11 September - Sung Jae-gi, anti-feminist (d. 2013)

== See also ==
- List of South Korean films of 1967
- Years in Japan
- Years in North Korea
