= 1955 in South Korea =

- Centuries: 20th; 21st
- Decades: 1940s; 1950s; 1960s; 1970s
- See also: Other events in 1955; Years in South Korea; Timeline of Korean history 1955 in North Korea

Events from the year 1955 in South Korea. In the wake of the 1953 Korean Armistice Agreement, this was a period of relative prosperity.

== Incumbents ==
- President: Rhee Syng-man
- Vice President: Ham Tae-young

== Events ==
- September 18-Democratic Party was founded.

== Births ==
- 1 January - Lee Sang-hyun
- 8 January-Jun Won-tchack, Korean lawyer and broadcaster
- 13 January-Huh Jung-moo South Korean football player and manager
- 16 February - Jeong Sun-ok
- 1 July - Yang Gui-ja, Korean novelist
- 11 July - Sim Soo-bong, Korean singer
- 28 September - Lee Soon-ok

== Death ==
- 18 February - Kim Seong-su, Korean educator, independence activist, journalist
- 16 August - Yi Kang, former royal

== See also ==
- List of South Korean films of 1955
- Years in Japan
- Years in North Korea
