= 1956 in South Korea =

- Centuries: 20th; 21st
- Decades: 1940s; 1950s; 1960s; 1970s
- See also: Other events in 1956; Years in South Korea; Timeline of Korean history 1956 in North Korea

Events from the year 1956 in South Korea.

== Incumbents ==
- President: Rhee Syng-man
- Vice President: Ham Tae-young (until 14 August), Chang Myon (starting 15 August)

== Births ==
- 10 April – Kwon Hee-deok, voice actress and writer (d. 2018)
- 18 June - Yoo Dong-geun.
- 1 December - Yim Tae-hee.

== Deaths ==
- 30 January - Kim Chang-ryong
- 20 March - Park In-hwan, Korean poet
- 5 May - Sin Ik-hui
- 6 September - Lee Jung-seob, Korean painter

== See also ==
- List of South Korean films of 1956
- Years in Japan
- Years in North Korea
