= 1952 in South Korea =

- Centuries: 20th; 21st
- Decades: 1940s; 1950s; 1960s; 1970s
- See also: Other events in 1952; Years in South Korea; Timeline of Korean history 1952 in North Korea

Events from the year 1952 in South Korea. The Korean War continued this year; United States President Dwight Eisenhower vowed in his first campaign to seek a peaceful resolution.

== Incumbents ==
- President: Rhee Syng-man
- Vice President: Kim Seong-su (until 29 May), Ham Tae-young (starting 15 June)
- Prime Minister:
  - until 24 April: Chang Myon
  - 24 April-6 May: Yi Yun-yong
  - starting 6 May: Chang Taek-sang

== Events ==
- October 28 – Korea Explosives, as predecessor of Hanhwa Group was founded.

== Births ==
- January 1 - Ahn Sung-ki, actor (d. 2026)
- January 5 - Jang Gwang, actor
- February 2 - Park Geun-hye, former South Korean president
- February 22 - Soon-Mi Chung, South Korean-born Norwegian musician and director
- May 8 - Lee Deok-hwa, actor
- May 16 - Lee Kye-in, actor
- June 18 - Lee Soo-man, South Korean record producer, best known as the founder of SM Entertainment,
- August 13 - Yang Hee-eun, South Korean singer
- October 5 - Jo O-ryeon, known for swimming the Korea Strait in 1980 (d. 2009)
- October 31 - Im Ha-ryong, actor
- Il Lee

== See also ==
- List of South Korean films of 1952
- Years in Japan
- Years in North Korea
