= 1958 in South Korea =

- Centuries: 20th; 21st
- Decades: 1940s; 1950s; 1960s; 1970s
- See also: Other events in 1958; Years in South Korea; Timeline of Korean history 1958 in North Korea

Events from the year 1958 in South Korea.

== Incumbents ==
- President: Rhee Syng-man
- Vice President: Chang Myon

== Events ==
- Korean Publishers Cooperative is established.

== Births ==
- 20 June - Jang Jung-hee.
- Lee Won-woo.
- Dae Sung Lee.

== See also ==
- List of South Korean films of 1958
- Years in Japan
- Years in North Korea
