= 1962 in South Korea =

- Centuries: 20th; 21st
- Decades: 1940s; 1950s; 1960s; 1970s; 1980s
- See also: Other events in 1962; Years in South Korea; Timeline of Korean history 1962 in North Korea

Events from the year 1962 in South Korea.

== Incumbents ==
- President: Yun Bo-seon (until 24 March), Park Chung-hee (starting 24 March)

== Events ==
- Park Chung-hee became president of the country.

== See also ==
- List of South Korean films of 1962
- Years in Japan
- Years in North Korea
