= 1968 in South Korea =

- Centuries: 20th; 21st
- Decades: 1940s; 1950s; 1960s; 1970s; 1980s
- See also: Other events in 1968; Years in South Korea; Timeline of Korean history 1968 in North Korea

Events from the year 1968 in South Korea.

== Incumbents ==
- President: Park Chung-hee
- Prime Minister: Chung Il-kwon

== Events ==
- January 17–29 - Blue House Raid
- January 23 - USS Pueblo (AGER-2) captured by North Korea
- February 6 - U.S. 2nd Infantry Division guard post attacked. 3 North Koreans killed by U.S. forces.
- March 27 - U.S. 2nd Infantry Division and ROK 25th Infantry Division ambush North Korean infiltrators. 3 North Koreans killed.
- April 1 – POSCO founded in Gyeongsangnam-do, as predecessor name was Pohang Steel.
- April 14 - U.S. Army Support Group truck ambushed south of the Joint Security Area in daylight.
- April 21 - 5 North Koreans killed and 15 North Koreans wounded by U.S. forces.
- July 3 - U.S. 2nd Infantry Division patrol ambushed in the DMZ.
- July 20 - U.S. 2nd Infantry Division patrol ambushed in the DMZ.
- July 21 - U.S. 2nd Infantry Division patrol ambushed in the DMZ.
- July 30 - U.S. 2nd Infantry Division patrol ambushed in the DMZ.
- August 5 - U.S. 2nd Infantry Division patrol ambushed south of the DMZ in daylight. 1 North Korean killed by U.S. forces.
- September 19 - 4 North Koreans killed by U.S. forces.
- September 27 - U.S. 2nd Infantry Division jeep ambushed in the DMZ.
- October 3 - one North Korean killed by U.S. forces.
- October 5 - U.S. 2nd Infantry Division patrol ambushed in the DMZ.
- October 11 - U.S. 2nd Infantry Division patrol ambushed North Korean Army infiltrators in the DMZ. 2 North Koreans killed by U.S. forces.
- October 23 - U.S. 2nd Infantry Division patrol engaged KPA infiltrators in the DMZ. one North Korean killed by U.S. forces.
- October 30 - Ulchin-Samcheok (Gangwon-do) landings by 120 men of North Korean Army Unit 124; 110 of them were killed, 7 were captured and 3 escaped. 40 South Korean soldiers and police officers and 23 South Korean civilians were killed.
- December 23 - Crew of USS Pueblo released at Panmunjom.

== Births ==
- January 14 - Kim Byung-joo, judoka
- February 22 - Kim Jung-ju, businessman (d. 2022)
- July 14 - Hwang Sun-Hong, football player and manager

== See also ==
- List of South Korean films of 1968
- Korean DMZ Conflict (1966–69)
