= 1959 in South Korea =

- Centuries: 20th; 21st
- Decades: 1940s; 1950s; 1960s; 1970s
- See also: Other events in 1959; Years in South Korea; Timeline of Korean history 1959 in North Korea

Events from the year 1959 in South Korea.

== Incumbents ==
- President: Rhee Syng-man
- Vice President: Chang Myon

== Events ==
- July 17 – Busan Municipal Stadium stampede, 67 persons died after heavy rain triggered a rush towards the upper areas of the stadium, according to National Police Agency of South Korea.
- December 1 – Hana Bank, present day of Hana Financial Group was founded.

== Births ==
- March 26 - Shin Jae-heum.

== Deaths ==
- Woo Jang-choon.

== See also ==
- List of South Korean films of 1959
- Years in Japan
- Years in North Korea
