= 1963 in South Korea =

- Centuries: 20th; 21st
- Decades: 1940s; 1950s; 1960s; 1970s; 1980s
- See also: Other events in 1963; Years in South Korea; Timeline of Korean history 1963 in North Korea

Events from the year 1963 in South Korea.

== Incumbents ==
- President: Park Chung-hee
- Prime Minister: Choi Tu-son (starting 17 December)

== Births ==
- 20 July - Moon Sung-kil.

== See also ==
- List of South Korean films of 1963
- Years in Japan
- Years in North Korea
