= Bibliography of North Korea =

List of works important to the study of North Korea

This is a list of works important to the study of North Korea.

== General reference ==
- Buzo, Adrian, ed. (2020). Routledge Handbook of Contemporary North Korea. Oxon: Routledge. ISBN 978-0-429-80399-4.
- Cumings, Bruce (2011). North Korea: Another Country. New York: New Press. ISBN 978-1-59558-739-8.
- A Handbook on North Korea (1st revised ed.). Seoul: Naewoe Press. 1998. OCLC 469900828.
- Hoare, James E. (2019). Historical Dictionary of Democratic People's Republic of Korea (Second ed.). Lanham: Rowman & Littlefield. ISBN 978-1-5381-1974-7.
- Hoare, James E. (2005). North Korea in the Twenty-First Century, an Interpretive Guide. Kent: Global Oriental Ltd. ISBN 978-1901903966.
- Kim, Ilpyong J. (2003). Historical Dictionary of North Korea. Lanham: Scarecrow Press. ISBN 978-0-8108-4331-8.
- North Korea Handbook. Seoul: Yonhap News Agency. 2002. ISBN 978-0-7656-3523-5.
- Understanding North Korea. Seoul: Institute for Unification Education, Ministry of Unification. 2017. OCLC 1013975057.
- Smith, Hazel; et al., eds. (1996). North Korea in The New World Order. London: Macmillan Press. ISBN 978-0333626337.
- Sweeney, J (2013). North Korea Undercover, Inside the World's Most Secretive State. London: Transworld Publishers. ISBN 978-0552170345.
- Worden, Robert L., ed. (2008). North Korea: A Country Study (5th ed.). Washington, D.C.: Government Printing Office. ISBN 978-0-16-088278-4.

=== Bibliographies ===
- Catalogue of Korean Publications. Pyongyang: Korea Publications Export & Import Corporation. 2016. ISBN 978-9946-29-343-1.
- Cha, Victor; Lee, Ji-Young (2013). "Politics of North Korea". Oxford Bibliographies. doi:10.1093/obo/9780199756223-0109.
- Clemens, Walter C. (2016). "North Korea and the World: A Bibliography of Books and URLs in English, 1997–2007". Journal of East Asian Studies. 8 (2): 293–325. doi:10.1017/S1598240800005336. ISSN 1598-2408.
- Fraser, Stewart E.; et al. (1972). North Korean Education and Society: A Select and Partially Annotated Bibliography Pertaining to the Democratic People's Republic of Korea. London: University of London Institute of Education. ISBN 978-0-900008-16-0.
- Grote, Rainer (2008). "The Democratic People's Republic of Korea: Select Bibliography". Oxford Constitutions of the World. Oxford University Press. OCW CM 58 (KP).
- Guide to Official Publications of Foreign Countries. Chicago: American Library Association cop. 1990. North Korea. OCLC 470790578.
- Halliday, Jon (2019). "Bibliographies on Korea". Bulletin of Concerned Asian Scholars. 11 (4): 45–50. doi:10.1080/14672715.1979.10424021. ISSN 0007-4810.
- Halliday, Jon (2019). "Further bibliography on North Korea". Bulletin of Concerned Asian Scholars. 16 (4): 56–57. doi:10.1080/14672715.1984.10412625. ISSN 0007-4810.
- Kang, Suk-Young; Watts, Thomas D. (2012). "Historical perspectives on North Korea: a brief introduction and bibliography". Journal of Comparative Social Welfare. 28 (3): 235–240. doi:10.1080/17486831.2012.755932. ISSN 1748-6831. S2CID 143582074.
- Kim, Yong-jin (1971). "Annotated Bibliography of North Korean Publications in Archaeology". Asian Perspectives. 14: 29–32. JSTOR 42927734.
- Robinson, Kenneth R. (October 2011). "Korean History Bibliography: North Korea". Center for Korean Studies, University of Hawaii. Archived from the original on 2020-10-25.

== Geography ==
- Corfield, Justin (2014). Historical Dictionary of Pyongyang. London: Anthem Press. ISBN 978-1-78308-341-1.

== Government and politics ==
- Buzo, Adrian (2017). The Guerilla Dynasty: Politics and Leadership in North Korea (Second ed.). New York: Routledge. ISBN 978-1-317-28497-0.
- Cha, Victor (2012). The Impossible State: North Korea, Past and Future. London: The Bodley Head. ISBN 978-1-4481-3958-3.
- Fifield, Anna (2019). The Great Successor: The Divinely Perfect Destiny of Brilliant Comrade Kim Jong Un. PublicAffairs. ISBN 978-1541742482.
- French, Paul (2016). Our Supreme Leader: The Making of Kim Jong-un. London: Zed Books. ISBN 978-1-78360-900-0.
- Kihl, Young W. (1984). Politics and Policies in Divided Korea: Regimes in Contest. Boulder: Westview Press. ISBN 978-0-86531-700-0.
- Lankov, Andrei (2014). The Real North Korea: Life and Politics in the Failed Stalinist Utopia (Fully updated and revised ed.). New York: Oxford University Press. ISBN 978-0-19-939003-8.
- McEachern, Patrick (2010). Inside the Red Box: North Korea's Post-totalitarian Politics. New York: Columbia University Press. ISBN 978-0-231-52680-7.
- Myers, B.R. (2011). The Cleanest Race: How North Koreans See Themselves and Why It Matters. Brooklyn: Melville House. ISBN 978-1-935554-97-4.
- Myers, B.R. (2015). North Korea's Juche Myth. Busan: Sthele Press. ISBN 978-1-5087-9993-1.
- Pak, Jung H. (2020). Becoming Kim Jong Un: A Former CIA Officer's Insights into North Korea's Enigmatic Young Dictator. New York: Ballantine Books. ISBN 978-1-9848-1972-7.
- Scalapino, Robert A.; Chong-Sik Lee (1972). Communism in Korea: The Movement. Vol. 1. Berkeley: University of California Press. ISBN 0-520-02274-2.
- Scalapino, Robert A.; Chong-Sik Lee (1972). Communism in Korea: The Society. Vol. 2. Berkeley: University of California Press. ISBN 0-520-02274-2.
- Suh, Dae-Sook (1981). Korean Communism, 1945–1980: A Reference Guide to the Political System. Honolulu: The University Press of Hawaii. ISBN 978-0-8248-0740-5.
- Suh, Dae-sook (1988). Kim Il Sung: The North Korean Leader. New York: Columbia University Press. ISBN 0231065736.
- Yang, Sung Chul (1994). The North and South Korean Political Systems: A Comparative Analysis. Boulder: Westview. ISBN 9788972250210.

=== Foreign relations ===
- Kim, Ilpyong J. (1998). Two Koreas in transition: implications for U.S. policy. Rockville: In Depth Books. ISBN 978-0-88702-067-4.
- Gills, BR (1996). Korea Verses Korea, a Case of Contested Legitimacy. London: Routledge.
- Schapiro, RA (June 1963). "The Foreign Policy of North Korea". The China Quarterly. 14: 30–50.
- Young, B (2017). A Revolutionary State: North Korea's Support of Non-State Actors, Past Policies and Future Issues. Academic Paper Series. Washington, D.C.: Korean Economic Institute of America.

=== Military ===
- Bermudez, Joseph S. (2001). Shield of the Great Leader: The Armed Forces of North Korea. Sydney: Allen & Unwin. ISBN 978-1-86448-582-0.
- Mitzer, Stijn; Oliemans, Joost (2015). North Korea's Armed Forces: On the Path of Songun. Solihull: Helion. ISBN 978-1-910777-14-5.

== History ==
- Buzo, Adrian (2004). The Making of Modern Korea. London: Routledge. ISBN 0-203-64512-X.
- Cumings, Bruce (2005). Korea's Place in the Sun: A Modern History (Updated ed.). New York: W. W. Norton. ISBN 978-0-393-34753-1.
- Hunter, Helen-Louise (1999). Kim Il-song's North Korea. Westport: Praeger. ISBN 978-0-275-96296-8.
- Lankov, Andrei (2002). From Stalin to Kim Il Song: The Formation of North Korea, 1945-1960. London: C. Hurst & Co. Publishers. ISBN 978-1-85065-563-3.
- Lankov, Andrei (2007). Crisis in North Korea: The Failure of De-Stalinization, 1956. Honolulu: University of Hawaii Press. ISBN 978-0-8248-3207-0.
- Oberdorfer, Don; Carlin, Robert (2013). The Two Koreas: A Contemporary History (Revised and updated third ed.). New York: Basic Books. ISBN 978-0-465-05088-8.
- Robinson, Michael Edson (2007). Korea's Twentieth-century Odyssey: A Short History. Honolulu: University of Hawaii Press. ISBN 978-0-8248-3174-5.
- Seth, Michael J. (2018). North Korea: A History. Macmillan International Higher Education. ISBN 978-1-352-00219-5.
- Szalontai, Balázs (2005). Kim Il Sung in the Khrushchev Era: Soviet-DPRK Relations and the Roots of North Korean Despotism, 1953-1964. Stanford: Stanford University Press. ISBN 978-0-8047-5322-7.

=== Korean War ===
- Cumings, Bruce (1981). The Origins of the Korean War: Liberation and the Emergence of Separate Regimes, 1945-1947. Vol. 1. Princeton University Press. ISBN 978-0-691-10113-2.
- Cumings, Bruce (1981). The Origins of the Korean War: Roaring of the Cataract, 1947-1950. Vol. 2. Princeton University Press. ISBN 978-0-691-10113-2.
- Cumings, Bruce (2010). The Korean War: A History. New York: The Modern Library. ISBN 978-0-679-60378-8.
- MacDonald, C (1990). Britain and the Korean War. Oxford: Basil Blackwell Ltd. ISBN 978-0631167716.

== Culture ==
- Demick, Barbara (2010). Nothing to Envy: Ordinary Lives in North Korea (Paperback ed.). New York: Spiegel & Grau. ISBN 978-0-385-52391-2.
- Fischer, Paul (2015). A Kim Jong-Il Production: The Extraordinary True Story of a Kidnapped Filmmaker, His Star Actress, and a Young Dictator's Rise to Power. New York: Flatiron Books. ISBN 978-0-241-96999-1.
- Gabroussenko, Tatiana (2010). Soldiers on the Cultural Front: Developments in the Early History of North Korean Literature and Literary Policy. Honolulu: University of Hawaii Press. ISBN 978-0-8248-6078-3.
- Hassig, Ralph; Oh, Kongdan (2009). The Hidden People of North Korea: Everyday Life in the Hermit Kingdom. Plymouth: Rowman & Littlefield. ISBN 978-0-7425-6718-4.
- Howard, Keith (2020). Songs for 'Great Leaders': Ideology and Creativity in North Korean Music and Dance. Oxford: Oxford University Press. ISBN 978-0-19-007752-5.
- Kim, Suk-Young (2010). Illusive Utopia: Theater, Film, and Everyday Performance in North Korea. Ann Arbor: University of Michigan Press. ISBN 978-0-472-02689-0.
- Lankov, Andrei (2014). North of the DMZ: Essays on Daily Life in North Korea. Jefferson: McFarland. ISBN 978-0-7864-5141-8.
- Myers, Brian (1994). Han Sorya and North Korean Literature: The Failure of Socialist Realism in the DPRK. Ithaca: East Asia Program, Cornell University. ISBN 978-0-939657-84-1.
- Portal, Jane (2005). Art Under Control in North Korea. London: Reaktion Books. ISBN 978-1-86189-236-2.
- Schönherr, Johannes (2012). North Korean Cinema: A History. Jefferson: McFarland. ISBN 978-0-7864-6526-2.

== Economy and infrastructure ==
- Schwekendiek, Daniel (2011). A Socioeconomic History of North Korea. Jefferson: McFarland. ISBN 978-0-7864-8541-3.
- Winstanley-Chesters, Robert (2020). Fish, Fishing and Community in North Korea and Neighbours: Vibrant Matter(s). Singapore: Springer Open. doi:10.1007/978-981-15-0042-8. ISBN 978-981-15-0042-8. S2CID 203625857.

== Education ==
- Kim, Hyung-chan; Kim, Dong-kyu (2005). Human Remolding in North Korea: A Social History of Education. Lanham: University Press of America. ISBN 978-0-7618-3172-3.

== See also ==
- Outline of North Korea
- Wikipedia:List of bibliographies
- North Korean studies
- Kim Il-sung bibliography
- Kim Jong-il bibliography
- Kim Jong-un bibliography
