= 1957 in South Korea =

- Centuries: 20th; 21st
- Decades: 1940s; 1950s; 1960s; 1970s
- See also: Other events in 1957; Years in South Korea; Timeline of Korean history 1957 in North Korea

Events from the year 1957 in South Korea. This was a year of relative prosperity after the Korean War.

== Incumbents ==
- President: Rhee Syng-man
- Vice President: Chang Myon

== Births ==
- June 2 - Djong Victorin Yu
- April 5 - Insooni
- April 7 - Kim Kap-soo, Kim Soo-chul
- November 6 - Kim Ki-taek

== Death ==
- October 10-Choe Nam-seon

== See also ==
- List of South Korean films of 1957
- Years in Japan
- Years in North Korea
