= 1961 in South Korea =

- Centuries: 20th; 21st
- Decades: 1940s; 1950s; 1960s; 1970s; 1980s
- See also: Other events in 1961; Years in South Korea; Timeline of Korean history 1961 in North Korea

Events from the year 1961 in South Korea.

== Incumbents ==
- President: Yun Posun
- Prime Minister: Chang Myon (until 18 May)

== Events ==
- 16 May - May 16 Coup

== Births ==
- 20 September - Na Young-hee, actress
- 1 December - Kim Jin-ho, archer

== See also ==
- List of South Korean films of 1961
- Years in Japan
- Years in North Korea
