= 1971 in North Korea =

- Centuries: 20th; 21st
- Decades: 1950s; 1960s; 1970s; 1980s; 1990s
- See also: Other events in 1971; Years in North Korea; Timeline of Korean history 1971 in South Korea

Events from the year 1971 in North Korea.

== Incumbents ==
- Premier: Kim Il Sung
- Supreme Leader: Kim Il Sung

== Births ==
- 10 May – Kim Jong-nam.
- 25 July – Kim Il.
- 27 September – Shin Je-bon.

== See also ==
- Years in Japan
- Years in South Korea
