= 1970 in North Korea =

- Centuries: 20th; 21st
- Decades: 1950s; 1960s; 1970s; 1980s; 1990s
- See also: Other events in 1970; Years in North Korea; Timeline of Korean history 1970 in South Korea

Events from the year 1970 in North Korea.

== Incumbents ==
- Premier: Kim Il Sung
- Supreme Leader: Kim Il Sung

== Events ==
5th Congress of the Workers' Party of Korea

== Births ==
- 5 March - Ri Gwang-sik.
- 24 August - Pak Yong-hui.

== See also ==
- Years in Japan
- Years in South Korea
