= 1955 in North Korea =

- Centuries: 20th; 21st
- Decades: 1940s; 1950s; 1960s; 1970s
- See also: Other events in 1955; Years in North Korea; Timeline of Korean history 1955 in South Korea

Events from the year 1955 in North Korea.

== Incumbents ==
- Premier: Kim Il Sung
- Supreme Leader: Kim Il Sung

== Events ==
- 28 December: Kim Il Sung delivers his "Juche Speech", On Eliminating Dogmatism and Formalism and Establishing Juche in Ideological Work.

== Establishments ==
- Foundation of Ice Hockey Association of North Korea.

== See also ==
- Years in Japan
- Years in South Korea
