= Lee Sang-hyun =

South Korean sculptor (born 1955)

Lee Sang-hyun (이상현) (born January 1, 1955) is a South Korean sculptor.
