= North Korea national amateur boxing athletes =

North Korea national amateur boxing athletes represents Democratic People's Republic of Korea or North Korea in regional, continental and world matches and tournaments sanctioned by the Amateur International Boxing Association (AIBA).

== Olympics ==
=== 2004 Athens Olympics ===
Two boxers represented North Korea in this edition of the Olympiad. Featherweight Kim Song Guk won a silver medal.

==== Entry list ====
- Kwak Hyok-Ju (Light Flyweight)
- Kim Song-Guk (Featherweight) - Silver

== Asian Games ==
=== 2006 Doha Asian Games ===
Four boxers represented North Korea in this edition of the Asiad. Ranked 11th with one bronze medal in a four-way tie with Japan, Syria and the host country Qatar.

==== Entry list ====
- Kim Song-Guk Featherweight - Bronze
- Kim Won Guk (Bantamweight)
- Kwak Hyok Ju (Flyweight)
- Ro Sok (Light Flyweight)
