= Chung Hyung-min =

South Korean biotechnologist (born 1964)

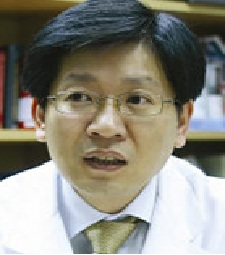
- Chung Hyung-min
- Born: 1964 (age 61–62); South Korea
- Education: Konkuk University
- Known for: Animal Biotechnology & Stem cell research
- Awards: 2004: Society for Assisted Reproductive Technology (SART) Prize Paper; 2009: "CEO of Next generation" (for Bio Technology), Ministry of Knowledge Economy
- Scientific career
- Fields: Stem cell research
- Workplaces: CHA Stem Cell Institute, CHA University
- Doctoral advisor: Chung Kil-saeng

Chung Hyung-min (born 1964) is a South Korean biotechnology professor. He was appointed professor at CHA University in 1997 after obtaining his BA, MA and Ph.D degree at Konkuk University.

Currently, he is a professor of biomedical science at CHA University, Director of CHA Stemcell Institute, President of CHA Bio & Diostech Inc., Member of LMO Assessment Advisory Committee for Ministry of Health and Welfare, and Advisor for the Ministry of Knowledge Economy under the National Technical Advisory Committee. Dr Chung is a prominent leader in the field of stem cell research with over 20 years of experience.

His research aims at the development of stem cell therapies using human adult and embryonic stem cells. Primarily, his study focusses on the clinical applications of human embryonic stem cell-derived retinal cells, artificial blood and cardiovascular cells.

His research group became only the second in the world to be approved to conduct clinical application of human embryonic stem cells for the treatment of an orphan disease named Stargardt's macular dystrophy.

== Education ==
- 1987: B.Sci., Kon-Kuk University, Department of Animal Biotechnology (major: Animal Biotechnology)
- 1993: Ph.D., Kon-Kuk University, Department of Animal Biotechnology (major: Animal Biotechnology)
- 1998: Visiting scientist, Columbia University, Department of Obstetrics and Gynecology.

== Awards ==
- October 3, 1998: Second Place Prize Paper, International Federation of Fertility Societies (IFFS) 16th World Congress on Fertility and Sterility and 54th Annual Meeting of the American Society for Reproductive Medicine (ASRM) in San Francisco ("In Vitro Blastocyst Formation of Human Oocytes Vitrified at the Immature, Maturing or Mature Stage"), California, United States.
- October 21, 2000: Best Video Award Winner, American Society for Reproductive Medicine (ASRM), ("Birth of a Baby Developed from Vitrified Oocytes"), 56th Annual Meeting at San Diego, California, United States.
- October 16, 2004: The 2004 Society for Assisted Reproductive Technology (SART) Prize Paper "Genes differentially expressed in primordial, primary and secondary follicles by cDNA microarray", 60th Annual Meeting of American Society for Reproductive Medicine (ASRM) at Philadelphia, USA.
- 2009: "CEO of Next generation" (for Bio Technology), Ministry of Knowledge Economy, South Korea.

== Publications ==
1. Lee, MJ; Kim, J; Lee, KI; Shin, JM; Chae, JI; Chung, HM (2011). "Enhancement of wound healing by secretory factors of endothelial precursor cells derived from human embryonic stem cells". Cytotherapy. 13 (2): 165–78. doi:10.3109/14653249.2010.512632. PMID 21235296.
2. Kim, MJ; Park, JS; Kim, S; Moon, SH; Yang, HN; Park, KH; Chung, HM (2011). "Encapsulation of bone morphogenic protein-2 with Cbfa1-overexpressing osteogenic cells derived from human embryonic stem cells in hydrogel accelerates bone tissue regeneration". Stem Cells and Development. 20 (8): 1349–58. doi:10.1089/scd.2010.0311. PMID 21126165.
3. Kim, EY; Jeon, K; Park, HY; Han, YJ; Yang, BC; Park, SB; Chung, HM; Park, SP (2010). "Differences between cellular and molecular profiles of induced pluripotent stem cells generated from mouse embryonic fibroblasts". Cellular Reprogramming. 12 (6): 627–39. doi:10.1089/cell.2010.0013. PMC 2998986. PMID 20958217.
4. Moon, SH; Kim, JS; Park, SJ; Lim, JJ; Lee, HJ; Lee, SM; Chung, HM (2011). "Effect of chromosome instability on the maintenance and differentiation of human embryonic stem cells in vitro and in vivo". Stem Cell Research. 6 (1): 50–9. doi:10.1016/j.scr.2010.08.006. PMID 20920899.
5. Park, SW; Jun Koh, Y; Jeon, J; Cho, YH; Jang, MJ; Kang, Y; Kim, MJ; Choi, C; et al. (2010). "Efficient differentiation of human pluripotent stem cells into functional CD34+ progenitor cells by combined modulation of the MEK/ERK and BMP4 signaling pathways". Blood. 116 (25): 5762–72. doi:10.1182/blood-2010-04-280719. PMID 20884805.
