= List of South Korean films of 1954 =

This is a list of films produced in South Korea in 1954.

Released	English title	Korean title	Director	Cast	Genre	Notes
1954
10 February	Glorious Construction	빛나는 건설	Yu Jang-san		Documentary	
6 April	A Turbid Water	탁류	Lee Man-heung		Gangster	
28 April	A Street of Temptation	유혹의 거리	Jeong Chang-hwa		Gangster, enlightenment	
1 May	Korea	코리아	Shin Sang-ok		Documentary	
15 May	Viva Chang-Su!	창수만세	Eo Yak-seon		Enlightenment	
11 June	Arirang	아리랑	Lee Kang-cheon		Drama, anticommunism	
15 June	The Bloody Road	혈로	Shin Kyeong-gyun		Anticommunism, war	
1 September	41 Degrees North latitude	북위 41도	Kim Seong-min		Action, military	
16 September	Assail Order	출격명령	Hong Seong-ki		Military	
5 December	Land of Love	애원의 향토	Kim Seong-min		Melodrama	
14 December	The Hand of Destiny	운명의 손	Han Hyung-mo		Noir, anticommunism	
?	A Woman Soldier	여군	Jo Jeong-ho		Documentary	
?	Chungnam Tour Account	충남만유기	Yim Woon-hak		Cultural film	
?	Song of Hometown	고향의 노래	Yun Bong-chun		Melodrama, enlightenment	
?	The Star of Million	백만의 별	Lee Yong-min		Military	
?	The Ten Years of Country Foundation	건국십년	Lee Chang-chun		Documentary	
