= Kim Yong-kap =

South Korean politician (1919–2007)

- Hangul: 김용갑
- Hanja: 金容甲
- RR: Gim Yonggap
- MR: Kim Yonggap

Kim Yong Kap (Korean: 김용갑; born January 6, 1919) was the Deputy Minister of Finance of South Korea in 1960.
