= 1956 in North Korea =

- Centuries: 20th; 21st
- Decades: 1940s; 1950s; 1960s; 1970s
- See also: Other events in 1956; Years in North Korea; Timeline of Korean history 1956 in South Korea

Events from the year 1956 in North Korea. Andrei Lankov calls 1956 a turning point in North Korean history. It marked the 3rd Congress of the Workers' Party of Korea (WPK) followed by two important plenums of the Central Committee of the WPK. The plenum in August became known as the August Faction Incident as Kim Il Sung's opponents unsuccessfully tried to oust him. It was followed by another plenum in September that saw Kim being pressured by China and the Soviet Union to tone down his political line. Kim, however, retaliated by beginning the purge of his party's Soviet faction that year.

== Incumbents ==
- Premier: Kim Il Sung
- Supreme Leader: Kim Il Sung

== Events ==
- 3rd Congress of the Workers' Party of Korea
- August Faction Incident
- September plenum of the Central Committee of the WPK
- 1956 North Korean local elections

== See also ==
- List of years in North Korea
- List of years in Japan
- List of years in South Korea
