= Kwon Hee-deok =

South Korean voice actress and writer (1956–2018)

Kwon Hee-duk
- Portrait of Kwon
- Born: 10 April 1956; Daejeon, South Korea
- Died: 16 March 2018 (aged 61); South Korea
- Occupations: Voice actress; writer
- Spouse: Koo Ja-heung
- Children: 2

Kwon Hee-duk (10 April 1956 – 16 March 2018) was a South Korean voice actress and writer. She developed her skills as a voice actress when she was young and was involved in more than 3,000 works in commercials, dramas and films during her professional career. Kwon authored a series of collection readings containing 14 lyrical poems from the two Koreas and an essay collection.

== Biography ==
On 10 April 1956, Kwon was born in Daejeon, and was brought up a Protestant. She developed her voice acting skills from an early age, taking on the role of master of ceremonies for a children's programme when she was in the second grade of elementary school. Kwon graduated from the Department of Broadcasting and Entertainment of the Seoul Institute of the Arts. In 1976, she passed the Broadcasting Voice Actor Recruitment Test against 700 competitors, making her debut not long. She was the dubbed voice of major actress from the Western world such as Meg Ryan in her roles of Sally in When Harry Met Sally... and The French Kiss, Ingrid Bergman, Lim Chung-ha, and Catherine Deneuve. Kwon also voiced the dub of Marie Antoinette in Lady Oscar, Shira in Queen of the Universe She Ra, and the role of Cordelia in the animated film Py Story.

Kwon received popularity voicing the character of her stepmother Yoo Ji-ae in the animation series Run Hani. She was the dubbed voice of the protagonist Lara in Doctor Zhivago, and was the narrator of a 1988 television advertisement for a Samsung Electronics video player product featuring the actress Choi Jin-sil with the tagline "It's up to you to be a man or a woman", which earned her national recognition. In 1996, she won the Grand Prize in the radio acting section at the Korea Broadcasting Awards. Kwon authored a series of collection readings, Do not grow old, mother, which contains 14 lyrical poems from the two Koreas. In 1999, she authored the essay collection entitled A woman's voice is up to her, which received a positive review from Yes24, and was the CEO of Seoul Sound Design. Kwon produced an animation parody called of a traditional fairy tale four years later. Overall, she was involved in more than 3,000 works in commercials, dramas and films during her professional career.

She was a disability campaigner, and held a fundraising dinner show to raise funding for disabled people's welfare. From May 2009, Kwon taught voice acting to nine students at Seoul Blind School.

== Personal life ==
She was a registered member of the Myeongdong Cathedral. Kwon was married to the former director of the Myeongdong Arts Theater Koo Ja-heung, with whom she had two children. She died suddenly of an acute myocardial infarction that gradually worsened whilst she was in hospital on 16 March 2018. Kwon's funeral took place at St. Mary's Hospital in Seoul three days later.
