= Seo Hajin =

South Korean writer (born 1960)

Seo Ha-jin
- Born: November 9, 1960 (age 65)
- Writing career
- Language: Korean

Korean name
- Hangul: 서하진
- RR: Seo Hajin
- MR: Sŏ Hajin

Seo Hajin (Korean: 서하진; born in 1960) is a South Korean writer.

== Life ==
So Hajin was born in 1960, in Yeongcheon, North Gyeongsang Province in Korea. Seo, whose given name is Seo Deoksun, writes under the pen name of Seo Hajin. Her father held considerable power during the military regime of the 1980s as the Prosecutor General and director general of the National Security Planning Agency (NSPA). Although she rejected her father's extreme right-wing ideological leanings, Seo recalls her childhood and adolescence as being relatively conflict-free with no instance of rebellious behavior. However, despite her outward obedience, she confesses to having a dark side to her nature, and claims her closest friends were her aunt's books; these books ultimately formed Seo's desire to become a writer. Seo debuted in the journal Hyeondae Munhak (Contemporary Literature) in 1994 with her short story A Shadow Outing.

== Work ==
Seo has attempted to explain feminine desire and challenge the patriarchal nature of Korean society and its customs. Seo debuted in the journal Hyeondae Munhak (Contemporary Literature) in 1994 with her short story "A Shadow Outing." In 1995, she began to receive more widespread attention with her story "Tidal Path," which has as its backdrop a mysterious island connected to land by a path that disappears and reappears with the changing of the tide. This story, which deals with the tragic outcome of an adulterous affair, was shortlisted for the Yi Sang Literature Award, ultimately drawing more attention than the winning work, and is still considered to be one of Seo's representative works. As in the case of "Tidal Path," many of Seo's early works, such as "A Shadow Outing," "A Shadow Journey," and "A Shadow You," are linked to the "shadow" theme and deal with the subjects of marital conflict and extramarital affairs. Her story "Hong Gildong" is a modern retelling of the classic Korean myth of the same name. Although the stories may explore conventional subject matter, Seo's writing features subtle psychological descriptions and a spare literary style.

Recently, Seo has gone beyond the subject of marital problems in order to tackle the meaning of the modern family. Her work portrays not the restored or disintegrated family, but instead an ordinary community that we all belong to, just as every person is a parent, child, or sibling. Seo carefully examines the conflicts and reconciliations within families.

== Works in Translation ==
- Hong Gildong (2007) (two short stories "Hong Gildong" and "The Woodcutter and the Nymph") ISBN 978-8988095911
- A Good Family (2008) (eight short stories) ISBN 978-1628971187

== Works in Korean (Partial) ==
Short Story Collections

- The Man Who Reads Us Books (1996)
- The Scent of Lavender (2000)
- Secret (2004)
- Yacht (2006)
- A Good Family (2009)

Novel

- Should I Tell You I Love You Again? (2005)

== Awards ==
- 10th HMS Literary Award in 2004 for her short story collection Secret
- Kim Jun Sung Literary Prize in 2009 with her short story "Who Are You?"
