= 1953 in North Korea =

- Centuries: 20th; 21st
- Decades: 1940s; 1950s; 1960s; 1970s
- See also: Other events in 1953; Years in North Korea; Timeline of Korean history 1953 in South Korea

Events from the year 1953 in North Korea.

== Incumbents ==
- Premier: Kim Il Sung
- Supreme Leader: Kim Il Sung

== Events ==
- July 27 – The Korean War ends, with the Korean Armistice Agreement: The United Nations Command (Korea) (United States), People's Republic of China and North Korea sign an armistice agreement at Panmunjom, and the north remains communist, while the south remains capitalist.
- August 17 - 12 high ranking government officials are arrested and forced to confess to spying for South Korea during the Korean war in a show trial. Lee Sung Yup, the Justice minister is declared to be the ringleader, former Foreign minister Pak Hong Wong and military officer Pae Choi were declared his accomplices.

== Establishments ==
- North Korea Peace Museum

== See also ==
- Years in Japan
- Years in South Korea
