= 1957 in North Korea =

- Centuries: 20th; 21st
- Decades: 1940s; 1950s; 1960s; 1970s
- See also: Other events in 1957; Years in North Korea; Timeline of Korean history 1957 in South Korea

Events from the year 1957 in North Korea. The second parliamentary elections were held, and only the first since the Korean Armistice Agreement was signed.

== Incumbents ==
- Premier: Kim Il Sung
- Supreme Leader: Kim Il Sung

== Events ==
- 1957 North Korean parliamentary election

== See also ==
- Years in Japan
- Years in South Korea
