= 1965 in North Korea =

- Centuries: 20th; 21st
- Decades: 1940s; 1950s; 1960s; 1970s; 1980s
- See also: Other events in 1965; Years in North Korea; Timeline of Korean history 1965 in South Korea

Events from the year 1965 in North Korea.

== Incumbents ==
- Premier: Kim Il Sung
- Supreme Leader: Kim Il Sung

== Births ==
- 4 November - Ri Yong-ae

== See also ==
- Years in Japan
- Years in South Korea
