= Korean Publishers Cooperative =

Korean Publishers Cooperative 한국출판협동조합
- Type: Cooperative
- Industry: distribution of publication
- Founded: 1958
- Headquarters: Seoul office : 448-6, Sinsu-dong, Mapo-gu, Seoul; Paju office : 202, Ogeum-ri, Tanhan-myeon, Paju, Gyeonggi
- Key people: Kim Jung-yung (Chairman); Hong Sung-de (executive director )
- Subsidiaries: Korea Publishing Logistics Co.Ltd.
- Website: Korean Publishers Cooperative

The Korean Publishers Cooperative was established in 1958. It is the nation's sole public-profit oriented book distribution center authorized in 1962 pursuant to the Enforcement Decree of the Small and Medium Enterprise Cooperative Act. A total of some 813 domestic publishing companies have joined this cooperative as members to seek development in the publishing culture and information industry, promote mutual welfare among members, and operate joint business. Books and other publications are distributed through approximately 500 bookstores and cooperatives across the nation. The cooperative chairman is Kim Jung-yung (2008 ~ present).

== History ==
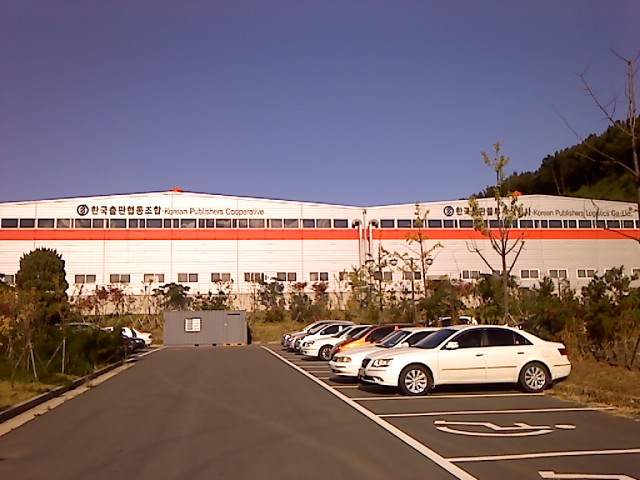
Korean Publishers Cooperative Paju Logistics Center and office

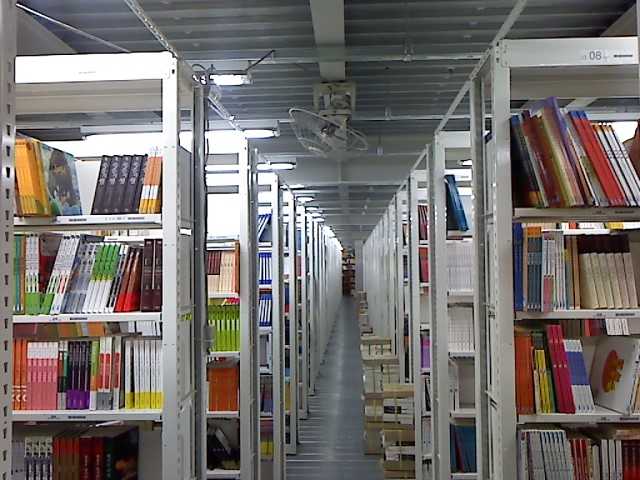
Korean Publishers Cooperative Paju Logistics Center

=== Korean Publishers cooperative ===
Established in 1958 (46 member companies with headquarters in Insa-dong, Jongno-gu, Seoul) with warehouse located in Paju Book City for joint sale of publications.

=== Commencement of business ===
- 1962 Company office building relocated (Sinmun-ro, Jongno-gu, Seoul)
- 1962 Approved as a Small and Medium Business Cooperative by the Ministry of Education
- 1966 Adopted Code of Ethics for joint supply of publications
- 1970 Published catalogs for children's books
- 1975 Won Good Cooperative award from the Korea Federation of Small and Medium Businesses
- 1977 Won Prime Minister's commendation at the 'Commerce-Industry Day ' commemorative ceremony
- 1980 Company building relocated (Sinsu-dong, Mapo-gu, Seoul)
- 1981 Inspected Japan's book distribution structures
- 1982 Received training at the U.S. publishing industry
- 1983 Jointly sponsored 1983 national book market for two years with KBS
- 1985 Won Good Organization award from the Minister of Commerce and Industry at the General meeting of the Korea Federation of Small and Medium Businesses
- 1991 Introduced and implemented unified supply system
- 1992 Won Presidential citation for meritorious publishing achievements
- 1993 Invited to Netherlands Central Book House for meetings
- 1994 Opened 'Bookstore school'
- 1998 Launched a ‘Send books to North Korea’ campaign with the Help our Race Together Campaign department
- 2001 Won Presidential citation in the Excellent Supporting organization sector at the 13th small and medium enterprise operators contest
- 2001 Opened a book school
- 2001 Took over Korea Publishing Logistics Co.Ltd.
- 2001 Ground-breaking ceremony for the construction of Paju Logistics Center
- 2002 Inspected Frankfurt International Book Fair and logistics facilities in Europe
- 2003 Completed Paju Logistics Center
- 2004 Held Korea-Germany book distribution and marketing seminars
- 2005 Signed an Industrial-education complex agreement with Open Cyber University
- 2005 Signed a business cooperation agreement with the Korea Federation of Bookstores Association
- 2006 Upgraded cooperative computer systems (under the support of the Small Medium Business Administration)
- 2007 Selected as a supporting company for the [Innovative task consulting] project being pursued under the sponsorship of the Small Medium Business Administration
- 2007 Cooperative project practice program approved by the Small and Medium Industry Promotion Corporation (3.94 billion won grant)
- 2007 Extension work started for the 99,600 square feet (9,250 m^{2}) warehouse located in Ogeum-ri, Tanhan-myeon, Paju
- 2008 Completed the extension work for Paju warehouse (101,500 square feet)
- 2008 Implemented an integrity contract system
- 2008 Signed a ‘5678 Happy bookstore’ agreement with the Seoul Metropolitan Rapid Transit Corporation (Bookstores opened at Yeongdeungpo Ward station, Taeneung station, Onsu station, Seokgye station and Wangsimni station)
- 2008 Completed rack facilities inside Paju warehouse. (Stacking racks, high racks and other types)
- 2009 Korea Occupational Safety and Health Agency decided to provide financial support for the improvement of harmful working environment
- 2009 Relocated Mapo Distribution Department to Paju Logistics Center
- 2009 Participated in the Small and Medium Enterprise Employment Maintenance Program sponsored by Shinhan Bank
- 2005 ~ 2009 Distribution of books for the Arts Council of Korea
- 2002 ~ 2009 Receiving and distributing academic (culture) books for the Ministry of Culture, Sports and Tourism.

== Major business ==
=== Book distribution ===
The publishing industry is suffering from the ever-increasing shortage of warehouse space, distribution facilities and workforce. To protect member companies from such difficulties, the Korean Publishers Cooperativeformed a unified supply system for the joint storage, delivery and marketing. All books published by member companies are distributed to all bookstores in the nation only through the cooperative. The unified supply system allows member companies to concentrate on only publication planning, which in turn allows the supply of books to readers, helping create higher earnings. Furthermore, books are also supplied to bookstores doing business with the nationwide cooperatives in addition to the direct-dealing of books of the member companies through general distribution services. In 2008, the cooperative signed an MOU with the Seoul Metropolitan Rapid Transit Corporation to operate seven Happy Bookstores in subway lines 5, 6, 7 and 8. Approximately 20 more bookstores will be opened in the future.

=== Book delivery ===
The cooperative has supplied books ordered by the Ministry of Culture, Sports and Tourism for the past seven years. This experience enables the cooperative to supply books needed by the state and public university libraries, schools, government offices, enterprises and research institutes. In addition, the cooperative provides consulting services to the government offices or ordinary enterprises so they can more effectively plan, select, and buy books needed on an irregular basis. To help librarians, the cooperative puts new book catalogs in the cooperative Home Page on a daily basis. The cooperative has built MARC Data and supplied them to all libraries operating in the nation, maintaining a more than 95% delivery rate by collecting books based on the order catalogs.

=== Credit Extension ===
Using the funds raised through contributions and loans, the cooperative makes monetary grants to members so they may publish books and build a solid foundation for the publishing and culture business.

=== Joint purchases ===
To reduce publishing companies’ expenses, the cooperative operates a coop paper purchasing and distribution program and a PR program where information on new publications and weekly/monthly bestsellers is provided.

== Subsidiary ==
=== Korea Publishing Logistics Co.Ltd. ===
Recognizing the importance of the book distribution business, the cooperative in October 2001 established Korea Publishing Logistics Co.Ltd, which is charged with the operation of warehouses and distribution centers. The building was built in Tanhyeon-myeon, Paju-si on a site of approximately 569,300 square feet (52,890 m^{2}) with total architectural area of approximately 213,500 square feet (19,830 m^{2}). Korea Publishing Logistics Co.Ltd. stores and manages books, the valuable assets of publishing companies, on a consignment basis. The warehouse can accommodate approximately 50,000,000 books. Backed up by such infrastructure, the cooperative uses its 10 years of experience to provide advanced IT-based logistics innovation services, 1:1 tailored service capable of verifying systems on a real-time basis, and SCM (Supply Chain Management system) +WMS (Warehouse Management System) + OMS (Order Management System). Through such services, logistics expenses are minimized, and books are handled from storage to final delivery. The nationwide distribution routes are subdivided to achieve same-day delivery for Seoul and neighboring Metropolitan areas, and delivery during the following day for rural areas. The cooperative operates four departments (General Affairs, Management, Marketing and Distribution). The cooperative chairman is also the CEO of Korea Publishing Logistics Co.Ltd.

== Organization ==
As of October 2009, there were 813 member companies, 73 unified companies, and approximately 500 bookstores operating under special agreement. The head office is located at Sinsu-dong, Mapo-gu, Seoul, and currently, the logistics and distribution department has moved to the logistics center in Paju. There are approximately 68 officers and employees including one chairman, one chief executive officer directly or indirectly, 20 directors and two auditors. The organization is composed of five departments and 13 teams. The Board of Directors operates four subcommittees and one branch committee under its control (management rationalization, real estate management, distribution innovation, loans, and the unified supply strengthening branch committee) to help the cooperative implement ethical operation. The chairman is appointed from among members at the general meeting to a 4-year term. The chairman is Kim Jung-yung, CEO of Ohsung Publishing Company, and the executive director is appointed by the chairman at the recommendation of the chairman from among those who are not cooperative members and who possess qualifications prescribed in Article 11–2, Enforcement Decree of the Small and Medium Enterprise Cooperative Act. Hong Sung-de is working as a full-time executive director at the cooperative.
