= List of South Korean films of 1953 =

This is a list of films produced in South Korea in 1953.

Released	English title	Korean title	Director	Cast	Genre	Notes
1953
15 July	The March	진격만리	Yun Bong-chun		Documentary	
15 November	The Final Temptation	최후의 유혹	Chung Chang-wha		Melodrama, Action	
15 December	The Load of Glory	영광의 길	Yun Bong-chun		Enlightenment, Military	
20 December	The Youth	청춘	Lee Man-heung		Melodrama	
?	Light of Hometown	고향의 등불	Jang Hwang-yeon		Enlightenment, Anticommunism	
?	Rifles and Swords	총검은 살아있다	Jo In-bok		Documentary	
?	The Love Mountains	태양의 거리	Lee Man-heung		Drama, Anticommunism	
