= 1971 Kimpo killings =

1971 Kimpo Mass Shooting
- Location: Kimpo, South Korea
- Date: January 18, 1971
- Weapons: M-16 rifle; hand grenades
- Deaths: 7 (Including the perpetrator)
- Injuries: 4
- Perpetrator: Kyung-yul King

On January 18, 1971, Kyung-yul King (Korean: 공경렬), a South Korean marine corps sergeant killed six people and wounded four others in a mass shooting in Kimpo, South Korea, before committing suicide.

After a drinking bout that night, King detonated two hand grenades inside the marine camp, and then ran into a nearby village, where he shot dead two soldiers and four villagers with his M-16 assault rifle and also injured four other villagers. Afterwards the 27-year-old fled into the mountains, where he committed suicide.
