= 1954 in North Korea =

- Centuries: 20th; 21st
- Decades: 1940s; 1950s; 1960s; 1970s
- See also: Other events in 1954; Years in North Korea; Timeline of Korean history 1954 in South Korea

Events from the year 1954 in North Korea. It was the first full year after the Korean Armistice Agreement, which led to a period of relative prosperity.

== Incumbents ==
- Premier: Kim Il Sung
- Supreme Leader: Kim Il Sung

== Establishments ==
- Korean Art Gallery

== See also ==
- Years in Japan
- Years in South Korea
