= Son Jong-nam =

North Korean defector

- Hangul: 손정남
- Hanja: 孫正男
- RR: Son Jeongnam
- MR: Son Chŏngnam

Son Jong-nam (11 March 1958 – 7 December 2008) was a North Korean defector and Christian missionary, who died in a Pyongyang prison after being arrested in 2006.

== Early life ==
Son was born in Chongjin, North Hamgyong. From 1973 to 1983, he served in the Korean People's Army as part of the presidential security service, rising to the rank of master sergeant; following his discharge, he began working at performing arts centre run by the military. Around 1992, he had one daughter. In 1997, his wife, pregnant with their second child, was arrested for allegedly insulting Kim Jong-il's mismanagement of the economy and blaming him for the North Korean famine. She was beaten while in custody, suffering a miscarriage as a result. That same year, Son's brother Son Jong-hun (손정훈) was charged with the illegal export of strategic items, and fled to China; he maintains that the charges were false.

== Defection ==
In January 1998, Son took his wife and daughter and fled North Korea, joining his brother in Yanji, Yanbian Korean Autonomous Region in northeast China's Jilin province. A South Korean missionary, who lived in the region on the pretext of involvement in the lumber business, sheltered them for some time after their arrival. However, Son's wife died of leukaemia seven months later. Son, distraught, began to grow closer to the missionary, leading to his eventual conversion to Christianity; he then aided the missionaries in converting other North Korean defectors in China. He was arrested by Chinese police and deported back to North Korea in January 2001, where his brother says he suffered electrical shocks and beatings with clubs, causing a limp in his leg and the loss of 32 kilograms (71 lb) of body weight. After his release in 2004, he sneaked back into China to see his daughter.

== Final return to North Korea ==
Son did not remain in China for long; he soon returned to North Korea with Bibles and cassette tapes in an effort to proselytise people in his home country. However, in January 2006, police found the Bibles at his home in Hoeryong and arrested him again. According to his brother, the charges were illegal border crossing, meeting with enemies of the state, and disseminating anti-state literature. Son was imprisoned in the basement of the State Security Department in Pyongyang.

In April, his brother submitted a petition to South Korea's National Human Rights Commission (NHRC) to halt his public execution, and held a press conference criticising the NHRC for their inaction on issues of human rights in North Korea. However, NHRC officials stated that the petition was without effect because North Korea was not subject to their intervention. Christian Solidarity Worldwide also planned a protest in front of the North Korean embassy in London around the same time as Son's brother submitted his petition. In July, Son's brother went on to meet with the United States Department of State officials and members of Congress to discuss his brother's case, including senator Sam Brownback, Jim Inhofe of the Senate Committee on Armed Services, and Richard Lugar of the Senate Committee on Foreign Relations. Todd Nettleton of American Christian organisation Voice of the Martyrs also attempted to organise people in the United States and South Korea to bring international pressure to bear on the North Korean government over the issue of Son's imprisonment.

Son's brother believes that the international pressure led North Korean authorities to cancel his public execution, only to switch to torturing him to death as a less public method of killing him. According to a November 2009 statement from a fellow State Security Department prison inmate, Son died there on December 7, 2008.
