= 1963 North Korean local elections =

Elections to provincial, city, county, district, town, neighborhood, village and workers' district people's assemblies (도·시·군·구역·리(동)·읍·로동자구 인민회의 대의원 선거) were held in North Korea on December 3, 1963.

In the elections, 2,517 provincial people's assembly deputies, 14,303 city, county and district people's assembly deputies and 70,250 town, neighborhood, village and workers' district people's assembly deputies were elected.

Voter turnout was reported to be 100%, with candidates allegedly receiving a 100% approval rate.
