= Mauritania–North Korea relations =

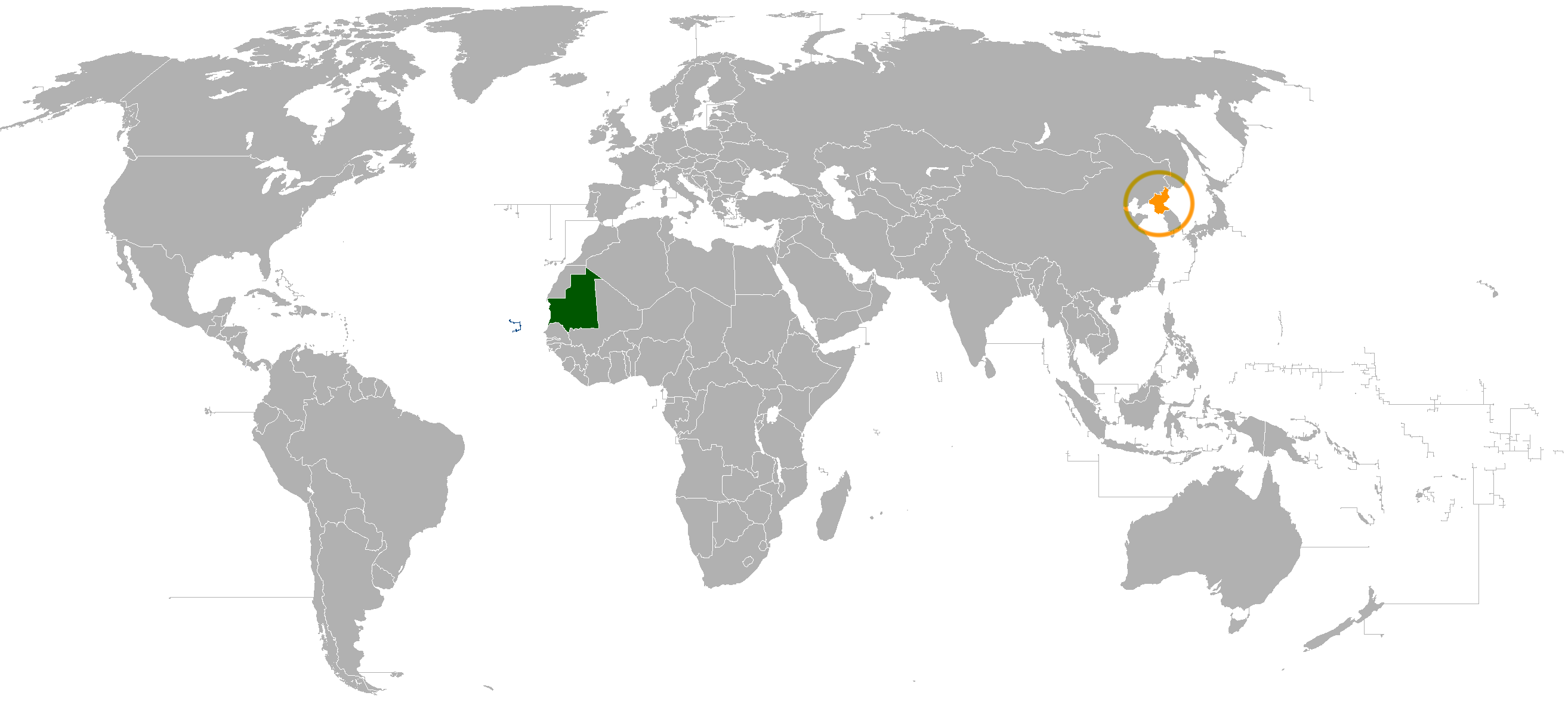

- Mauritania: North Korea

Mauritania–North Korea relations refers to the current and historical relationship between the Islamic Republic of Mauritania and the Democratic People's Republic of Korea (DPRK), commonly known as North Korea. Neither country maintains an embassy in their respective capitals.

== History ==
Despite Mauritania's pro-French stance during the Cold War, the country maintained relatively close ties with the DPRK at times. Diplomatic relations were established on 11 November 1964, which caused South Korea to break off relations with Mauritania. On 4 November 1964, North Korea and Mauritania had issued a Joint Communiqué calling for the withdrawal of all foreign armed forces from Asia, Africa and Latin America, and endorsing the second Afro-Asian conference.

In 1967, President Moktar Ould Daddah of Mauritania went on a state visit to Pyongyang. In 1970, Kang Ryang-uk led an important delegation to Mauritania.

On 30 May 1975, Kim Il Sung made a state visit to Mauritania. This, jointly with a visit to neighboring Algeria during the same trip, was the sole occasion that the North Korean Leader visited a country outside of the East bloc and Asia. During the trip, Kim Il Sung was awarded with the Grand National Order of Merit of Mauritania. The visit is commemorated in the International Friendship Exhibition, which features a world map on which Mauritania and other countries visited by the country's Eternal President are lit up (in addition to a photo of Kim and President Ould Daddah). The visit was also commemorated in a North Korean newsreel. Almost immediately, in 1976, the reel was pulled from circulation because North Korea's relations with Mauritania soured after North Korea recognized the Sahrawi Arab Democratic Republic.

Relations presumably remained strained during the late 1970s and early 1980s, due to North Korean aid to and military backing for the Polisario Front and the Sahrawi Arab Democratic Republic during the Western Sahara War.

In June 1977, diplomatic relations between the two countries were broken off, and remained such for some time.

In April 2017, a delegation from North Korea led by Vice Foreign Minister Sin Hong Chol visited Mauritania, where they paid a courtesy call on Foreign Minister Isselkou Ould Ahmed Izid Bih and discussed strengthening bilateral cooperation and coordination on matters of mutual interest.

In 9 September 2018, President Mohamed Ould Abdel Aziz of Mauritania visited Pyongyang, North Korea, to participate in celebrations marking the 70th anniversary of the country’s founding. He was accompanied by a high-level delegation.

== See also ==
- Foreign relations of Mauritania
- Foreign relations of North Korea
