= Paik Too-chin =

South Korean politician (1908–1993)

His Excellency The Right Honourable Paik Too-chin 백두진
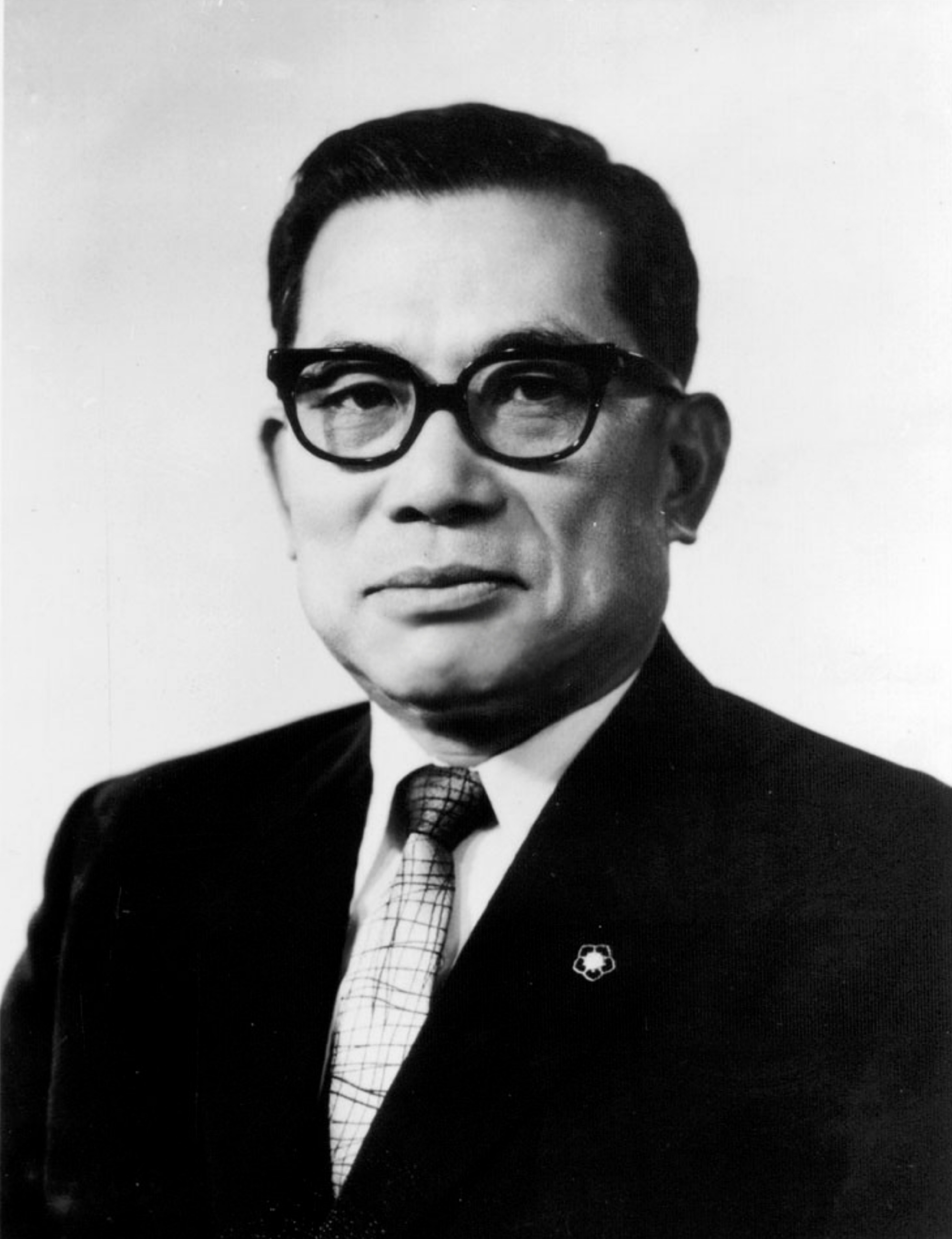

4th & 10th Prime Minister of South Korea
- In office October 9, 1952 – April 23, 1953 (acting)
- President: Syngman Rhee
- Preceded by: Jang Taek-sang
- Succeeded by: (Himself)
- In office April 24, 1953 – June 17, 1954
- President: Syngman Rhee
- Preceded by: (Himself)
- Succeeded by: Pyon Yong-tae
- In office December 21, 1970 – June 3, 1971
- President: Park Chung Hee
- Preceded by: Chung Il-kwon
- Succeeded by: Kim Jong-pil

Personal details
- Born: October 7, 1908 Sinch'ŏn, Hwanghae Province, Korean Empire
- Died: September 5, 1993 (aged 84) Seoul, South Korea
- Party: Democratic Republican Party
- Education: Tokyo College of Commerce

Korean name
- Hangul: 백두진
- Hanja: 白斗鎭
- RR: Baek Dujin
- MR: Paek Tujin

Art name
- Hangul: 소계
- Hanja: 小溪
- RR: Sogye
- MR: Sogye

Paik Too-chin or Baek Du-jin (Korean: 백두진; October 7, 1908 – September 5, 1993) was a South Korean politician. He was acting prime minister until confirmed in office by the National Assembly on April 24, 1953, when he became the prime minister of South Korea.

== See also ==
- List of prime ministers of South Korea

Preceded by Jang Taek-sang	4th Prime Minister of South Korea; 1952 – 53 (acting); 1953 – 54	Succeeded by Byeon Yeong-tae
Preceded by Chung Il-kwon	10th Prime Minister of South Korea; 1970 – 71	Succeeded by Kim Jong-pil
