= Chung Il-kwon =

South Korean general (1917–1994)

His Excellency Chung Il-kwon
- 정일권
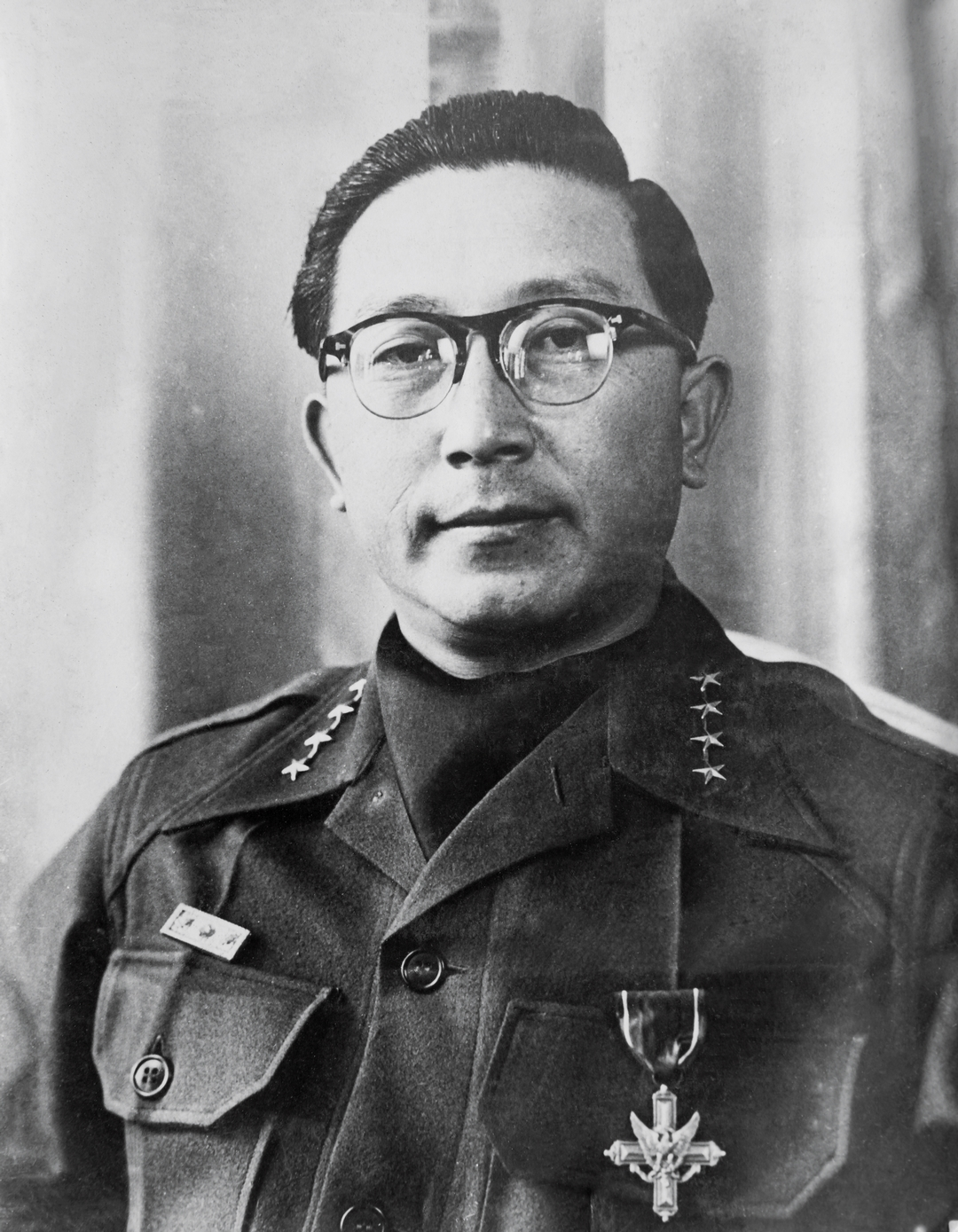
- Chung, 1950s

9th Prime Minister of South Korea
- In office May 10, 1964 – December 20, 1970
- President: Park Chung Hee
- Deputy: Chang Ki-young
- Preceded by: Choi Tu-son
- Succeeded by: Baek Du-jin

Personal details
- Born: November 21, 1917 Nikolsk-Ussuriysky, Primorskaya Oblast, Russian SFSR
- Died: January 17, 1994 (aged 76) Hawaii, United States
- Occupation: Politician, cabinet minister, South Korean prime minister
- Awards: Honorary Grand Commander of the Order of the Defender of the Realm (Malaysia)

Military service
- Allegiance: Manchukuo; South Korea
- Branch/service: Manchukuo Imperial Army (1941–1945); Republic of Korea Army
- Years of service: 1941–1957
- Rank: Captain; General
- Battles/wars: Second Sino-Japanese War; Korean War

- Chung Il-kwon
- Hangul: 정일권
- Hanja: 丁一權
- RR: Jeong Ilgwon
- MR: Chŏng Ilgwŏn

Art name
- Hangul: 청사
- Hanja: 淸史
- RR: Cheongsa
- MR: Ch'ŏngsa

Courtesy name
- Hangul: 일진
- Hanja: 一鎭
- RR: Iljin
- MR: Ilchin
- Japanese name: Nakashima Ikken (中島一權)

Chung Il-kwon (Korean: 정일권; November 21, 1917 – January 17, 1994) was a South Korean politician, diplomat, and soldier. A general in the Republic of Korea Army, he served as foreign minister 1963 to 1964, and prime minister from 1964 to 1970. He was an ally of President Park Chung Hee.

His art name was Chungsa (청사). He was also known by the Japanese pronunciation of his name: Tei Ikken.

== Early life ==
Chung was born in Nikolsk-Ussuriysky in Primorskaya Oblast, Russia, where his father worked as an interpreter for the Imperial Russian Army. After the Bolshevik Revolution of 1917, his father moved the family to his hometown Kyongwon County, Kankyōhoku Province, Korea, Empire of Japan (now North Hamgyong Province, North Korea). However, in 1930, the family relocated to what is now Yanbian Korean Autonomous Prefecture in Manchuria, where Chung grew up in extreme poverty. While living under Japanese occupation, he was given the Japanese name Ikken Nakashima.

== Military Career ==
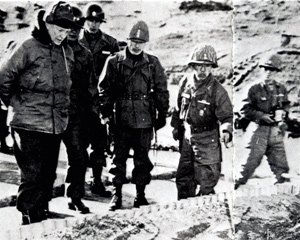
Chung Il-kwon alongside Dwight D. Eisenhower, Kim Baik-Il, Baik Seon-yup during the Korean War

Due to his excellent grades in school, Chung won a place at the Manchukuo Imperial Army academy in Mukden, from which he graduated in September 1937. Again, his performance was regarded as excellent, and he was sent on to attend the 55th class of the Imperial Japanese Army Academy in Tokyo, where he specialized in cavalry operations. He also assumed the Japanese name Nakajima Ikken (中島一權). During the Pacific War, he served in the Manchukuo Imperial Army as a military police captain. Following the Soviet invasion of Manchuria at the end of World War II, he was briefly captured by Soviet forces and interrogated by the KGB.

Chung graduated from the first class of the Korea Military Academy in 1946 and was commissioned into the South Korean army. He was in Hawaii undergoing military training at the start of the Korean War. He arrived in Korea on June 30, and was immediately promoted to major general and replaced General Chae Byong-duk as commander of the Republic of Korea Army. Serving as a tactical commander and then major general in the Korean War, Chung Il Kwon, organized the South Korean soldiers at Inchon. His initial responsibilities included regrouping the routed South Korean military forces and coordinating their efforts with the United Nations Command.

He was the commander of all ROK forces in Pusan from July–August, which would place him at the Battle of Incheon. This was known for incapacitated the North Korean Army and leaving him a well-known war hero. He returned to the United States for additional training in July 1951 following the National Defense Corps Incident and the Geochang massacre. However, on his return in July 1952 he was demoted by President Syngman Rhee to a divisional command and sent to a front-line combat unit. Three months later, he was promoted to deputy commander of the IX Corps (United States) commanding front line UN forces in numerous offensives and counteroffensives. Three months after this, he was again promoted to command the ROK II Corps, which he held until the end of the war.

== Political Career ==
After retiring from the military in 1957, he served as South Korea's ambassador to Turkey. In 1960, he was appointed ambassador to France, and then served as ambassador to the United States from 1960 to 1961 and 1962 to 1963. From 1963 to 1964 Chung served as Foreign Minister of South Korea and was Prime minister of South Korea from 1964 to 1970. During his time as an ambassador, he also took the time to study political science and international relations at prestigious universities such as Oxford and Harvard.

From 1971, Chung served as a member of the National Assembly from the Democratic Republican Party for three consecutive terms. He also served as chairman in the ninth National Assembly of 1973–1979.

In March 1991, Chung received treatment for lymph cancer in Hawaii. Although he continued political activities in 1992 for the Democratic Republican Party in 1993, particularly in support of Kim Young-sam during the 1992 Korean presidential election, he was re-hospitalized in Hawaii in January 1994 due to cancer, and died there. He received a state funeral and was buried at the Seoul National Cemetery. Survived by his four children and his wife, Park Hye-Soo, after his death in Hawaii.

== Honours ==
=== Foreign honours ===
- Malaysia : Honorary Grand Commander of the Order of the Defender of the Realm (S.M.N.) (1965)
- United States : Chief Commander of the Legion of Merit (29 April 1957)

== Works ==
- War and Ceasefire (전쟁과 휴전)
- Chung Il-kwon's Memoir (정일권 회고록, 丁一權 回顧綠)

== See also ==
- Chang Myon
- Kim Jong-pil
- Korean War
- Paik Sun-yup
- Park Chung Hee

Political offices
Preceded by Choi Du-sun	Prime Minister of South Korea; 1964–1970	Succeeded by Baek Du-jin
Preceded by Yang Yu-chan	Republic of Korea Ambassador to USA; 1960–1961	Succeeded by Chang Li-wook
Preceded by Chang Li-wook	Republic of Korea Ambassador to USA; 1962–1963	Succeeded by Kim Jeong-ryul
Preceded by Kim Yong-sik	Foreign minister of South Korea; 1963–1964	Succeeded by Lee Dong-won
Preceded by Lee Dong-won	Foreign minister of South Korea; 1966–1967	Succeeded by Choi Kyu-hah
