= Embassy of Russia, Pyongyang =

Diplomatic mission in North Korea

Embassy of Russia in Pyongyang Russian: Посольство России в КНДР Korean: 조선민주주의인민공화국주재 로씨야련방대사관
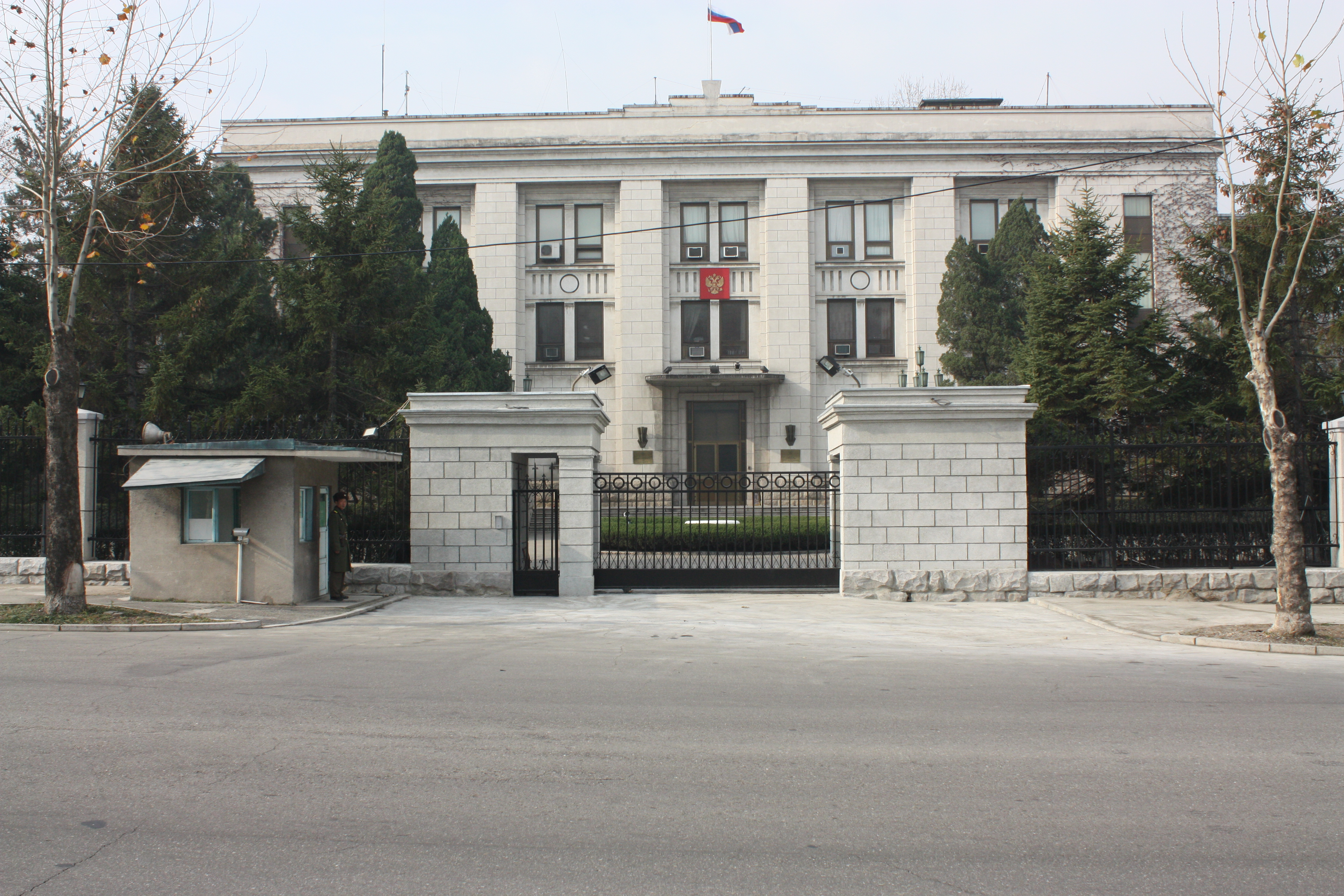
- Location: Jungkuyok, Pyongyang, North Korea
- Coordinates: 39°01′28″N 125°44′46″E
- Ambassador: Position vacant
- Website: dprk.mid.ru/ru

Embassy of Russia in Pyongyang（Russian: Посольство России в КНДР ; Korean: 조선민주주의인민공화국주재 로씨야련방대사관）is the official diplomatic mission of the Russian Federation in the Democratic People’s Republic of Korea. The position of ambassador is currently vacant due the passing of Aleksandr Matsegora.

== History ==
In 1948, following North Korea's independence, the Soviet Union immediately recognized them and established diplomatic relations. Soon afterwards, the embassy became a place where the Soviets discussed with the North Koreans about the military capabilities of the South Koreans and Americans, likely so that they could assess the practicality of ending the Division of Korea by military force.

In 2020, the North Korean government forced a lockdown in the embassy to prevent the spread of COVID-19 pandemic in North Korea. There were claims that the situation was so dire that the Russian delegation and their families left the country by pushing a rail cart due to the closure of rail services in the country. In September 2023, the embassy became the second embassy in North Korea that has allowed for personnel to arrive in the country, after years of lockdown. This was likely in anticipation of the 2023 North Korea-Russia summit that took place later that month.

== List of Ambassadors ==
Name	Appointment	Credentials presented	Termination	Notes
Aleksandr Kapto	December 26, 1991		January 24, 1992	
Yuri Fadeyev	January 24, 1992		August 12, 1996	
Valery Denisov	August 12, 1996		July 9, 2001	
Andrei Karlov	July 9, 2001		December 20, 2006	
Valery Sukhinin	December 20, 2006		April 5, 2012	
Aleksandr Timonin	April 5, 2012		December 26, 2014	
Aleksandr Matsegora	December 26, 2014	March 9, 2015	December 6, 2025	
Andrei Podyolyshev	July 28, 2026			

== Related pages ==
- North Korea–Russia relations
- Embassy of North Korea, Moscow
- List of diplomatic missions of Russia
- List of diplomatic missions in North Korea
