= 1945 in North Korea =

- Centuries: 20th; 21st
- Decades: 1940s; 1950s; 1960s
- See also: Other events in 1946; Years in North Korea; Timeline of Korean history

The following lists events that happened during 1945 in North Korea, then governed by the People's Republic of Korea and Soviet Civil Administration. (To see what happened in South Korea during the same period, see 1945 in South Korea.)

== Incumbents ==
=== Empire of Japan ===
- Emperor:
  - Hirohito (until 12 September)
- Prime minister:
  - Kantarō Suzuki (until 17 August)
  - Naruhiko Higashikuni (from 17 August to 12 September)
- Governor-general:
  - Nobuyuki Abe (until 12 September)

=== Soviet Civil Administration in Korea ===
- Head Administrator (de facto):
  - Terentii Shtykov (from 1945)
- Head of the Civil Administration:
  - Andrei Romanenko (from 1945)

=== People's Committee of North Korea ===
- Chairman: Kim Il Sung

=== Provisional People's Committee of North Korea ===
- Chairman: Kim Il Sung

=== People's Republic of Korea ===
- President: Syngman Rhee (from 1945)
- Chairman of the National People's Representative Conference: Lyuh Woon-hyung (from and until 1945)

== Events ==
=== August ===
- August 15 – Transfer of power happens at 9 a.m. from the Japanese to Lyuh Woon-hyung (head of the People's Republic) in Seoul. This decision was rescinded after the Soviets do not go further down all the way to Seoul. Japan takes back control in August 20th. Korea liberated after the broadcast of the surrender speech of Japanese Emperor Showa. Soviet invasion of Manchuria is ongoing in Chongjin.
- August 16 – Soviet takes over Chongjin. Committee for the Preparation of Korean Independence (CPKI) is founded by Lyuh Woon-hyung.
- August 20 – Soviets arrive in Wonsan.
- August 22 – Soviets occupy Pyongyang.

=== September ===
- September 6 - People's Republic of Korea is officially proclaimed.
- September 11 - The Kyongui line officially ceases operation due to the division of Korea.

=== October ===
- October 3 – The Soviet Civil Administration is officially established.
- October 10 - Kim Il Sung founds the North Korean Branch Bureau of the Communist Party of Korea.

=== November ===
- November 23 – Sinuiju incident occurs.

=== December ===
- December 16 – North Korea is affected by the situation related to the Moscow Conference (1945).

== See also ==
- List of Korean films of 1919–1948
