= 1948 in Korea =

1948 in Korea may refer to:

- 1948 in North Korea
- 1948 in South Korea
