= 1951 in Korea =

1951 in Korea may refer to:

- 1951 in North Korea
- 1951 in South Korea
