= 1949 in Korea =

1949 in Korea may refer to:

- 1949 in North Korea
- 1949 in South Korea
