= 1947 in Korea =

1947 in Korea may refer to:

- 1947 in North Korea
- 1947 in South Korea
