= List of leaders of North Korea =

The following is a list of de jure and de facto leaders of North Korea since its founding in 1948.

== Soviet occupation ==
After the end of World War II in East Asia, Korea was divided into two separate occupation zone, with the US military administration in the south, and the Soviet authority ruled the northern part.

Holders	Took office	Left office	Position
Soviet Civil Administration
Terentii Shtykov	1945	1948	Head administrator of the SCA (de facto).
Andrei Romanenko	1945	1947	Head of Civil Administration (de jure).
Nikolai Lebedev	1947	1948	Head of Civil Administration (de jure).

== People's Committee period (1946–1948) ==
Holders	Took office	Left office	Deputy	Deputy's tenure
Chairmen of the Provisional People's Committee
Kim Il Sung	9 February 1946	22 February 1947	Kim Tu-bong	1946–1947
Chairmen of the People's Committee
Kim Il Sung	22 February 1947	9 September 1948	Kim Chaek	1947–1948
Kim Il Sung	22 February 1947	9 September 1948	Hong Ki-ju	1947–1948

== Supreme Leader ==
The Supreme Leader is the de facto ruler of North Korea, most of whom are descended from the Kim's family who has been ruling the country since 1948.

Holders	Took office	Left office	Connection
Supreme Leader of North Korean
Kim Il Sung	9 September 1948	8 July 1994	Kim family
Kim Jong Il	8 July 1994	17 December 2011	Kim family
Kim Jong Un	17 December 2011	present	Kim family

== See also ==
- Politics of North Korea
- Workers' Party of Korea
- Government of North Korea
