= 1946 in Korea =

1946 in Korea may refer to:

- 1946 in North Korea
- 1946 in South Korea
