= 1950 in Korea =

1950 in Korea may refer to:

- 1950 in North Korea
- 1950 in South Korea
