= 1947 in North Korea =

- Centuries: 20th; 21st
- Decades: 1940s; 1950s; 1960s
- See also: Other events in 1947; Years in North Korea; Timeline of Korean history

The following lists events that happened during 1947 in North Korea, then governed by the People's Committee of North Korea and the Provisional People's Committee of North Korea.

== Incumbents ==
=== Soviet Civil Administration in Korea ===
- Head Administrator (de facto):
  - Terentii Shtykov
- Head of the Civil Administration:
  - Andrei Romanenko (until 1947)
  - Nikolai Lebedev (from 1947)

=== People's Committee of North Korea ===
- Chairman: Kim Il Sung

=== Provisional People's Committee of North Korea ===
- Chairman: Kim Il Sung

== Events ==
- February 24-25 :1947 North Korean local elections
- September 19:Amnokgang Sports Club is founded.

== See also ==
- List of Korean films of 1919–1948
