= 1945 in Korea =

1945 in Korea may refer to:

- 1945 in North Korea
- 1945 in South Korea
