= 1948 in North Korea =

- Centuries: 20th; 21st
- Decades: 1940s; 1950s; 1960s
- See also: Other events in 1948; Years in North Korea; Timeline of Korean history 1948 in South Korea

The following lists events that happened during 1948 in the Democratic People's Republic of Korea.

== Incumbents ==
=== Soviet Civil Administration in Korea ===
- Head Administrator (de facto):
  - Terentii Shtykov (until 1948)
- Head of the Civil Administration:
  - Nikolai Lebedev (until 1948)

=== Democratic People's Republic of Korea ===
- Premier: Kim Il Sung (starting 9 September)
- Supreme Leader: Kim Il Sung (starting 9 September)

== Events ==
- Establishment of North Korea(DPRK).
- 2nd Congress of the Workers' Party of North Korea

=== August ===
- August 25 - 1948 North Korean parliamentary election

== See also ==
- Years in Japan
- Years in South Korea
- List of Korean films of 1919–1948
