= Aleksandr Timonin =

Russian diplomat

- Александр Тимонин

Russian Ambassador to South Korea
- In office 26 December 2014 – 18 July 2018
- President: Vladimir Putin
- Preceded by: Konstantin Vnukov
- Succeeded by: Andrey Kulik

Russian Ambassador to North Korea
- In office 5 April 2012 – 26 December 2014
- President: Vladimir Putin
- Preceded by: Valery Sukhinin
- Succeeded by: Aleksandr Matsegora

Personal details
- Born: 24 July 1952 (age 74) Tula, Russian SFSR, Soviet Union
- Education: Moscow State University; Russian MFA Diplomatic Academy
- Occupation: Diplomat

Aleksandr Andreyevich Timonin (Russian: Александр Андреевич Тимонин; born 24 July 1952) is a Russian diplomat who served as the Russian Ambassador to North Korea from 2012 to 2014.

== Biography ==
He graduated from the Institute of Asian and African Countries at Moscow State University (1975) and the Higher Diplomatic Courses at the Diplomatic Academy of the Ministry of Foreign Affairs of the Russian Federation (1999). He is Candidate of Historical Sciences (1979). He has been in diplomatic service since 1980. In 1975-1980, he was a research and teaching assistant at the Institute of Asian and African Countries at Moscow State University. In 1987-1992, he was the first secretary and adviser to the Soviet and following the dissolution of the Soviet Union, Russian embassy in North Korea. In 1999-2000, he was the Minister-Counselor of the Russian embassy in North Korea. In 2000-2004 and 2006-2011, he was the Minister-Counselor of the Russian embassy in South Korea. In 2004-2006 he served as deputy Director of the First Asian Department of the Russian Foreign Ministry, Deputy Head of the Russian delegation at the Six-party talks on the settlement of the nuclear problem of the Korean Peninsula. In 2011-2012 he was Ambassador-at-Large of the Russian Foreign Ministry. From April 5, 2012 to December 26, 2014 he served as the Ambassador Extraordinary and Plenipotentiary of Russia to the DPRK. From December 26, 2014 to July 18, 2018 he served as Ambassador Extraordinary and Plenipotentiary of Russia to the Republic of Korea. On 30 July he received first-class Envoy title.
