= Valery Denisov =

Russian diplomat (1941–2026)

- Валерий Денисов

Russian Ambassador to North Korea
- In office 12 August 1996 – 9 July 2001
- President: Boris Yeltsin; Vladimir Putin
- Preceded by: Yuri Fadeyev
- Succeeded by: Andrei Karlov

Personal details
- Born: 1 November 1941 Moscow, Russian SFSR, Soviet Union
- Died: 7 May 2026 (aged 84)
- Education: MGIMO; Russian MFA Diplomatic Academy
- Occupation: Diplomat

Valery Iosifovich Denisov (Russian: Валерий Иосифович Денисов; 1 November 1941 – 7 May 2026) was a Russian diplomat who served as the Russian Ambassador to North Korea from 1996 to 2001.

== Life and career ==
Denisov was born on 1 November 1941 to Iosif Vladimirovich Denisov, who died in 1944 during World War II at the front in Poland, and to Maria Mitrofanovna Denisova, a worker. He graduated from the Korean Department of the Faculty of International Relations of the Moscow State Institute of International Relations in 1970 and the Diplomatic Academy of the Soviet Ministry of Foreign Affairs in 1983. He held the degree Candidate of Law (11 August 1976), Doctor of Historical Sciences (12 July 1991) and Academician of the Russian Academy of Natural Sciences in 1996. He was involved in diplomatic work since 1970. In 1970–1974, 1977–1981 and 1983–1987 he was an employee of the Soviet Embassy in the DPRK. In 1992–1994 he was an employee of the Russian Embassy in the DPRK. In 1994–1996 he served as Deputy Director of the 1st Department of Asia of the Russian Ministry of Foreign Affairs. From 12 August 1996 to 9 July 2001 he served as the Ambassador Extraordinary and Plenipotentiary of the Russian Federation to the North Korea. In 2001–2002 he served as Ambassador at Large of the Russian Foreign Ministry, representative of the Russian Foreign Ministry to the Eurasian Economic Community. Over the years, he concurrently taught and researched at the Diplomatic Academy of the Russian Foreign Ministry, Moscow State University, Moscow State Linguistic University, and the Institute of Far Eastern Studies of the Russian Academy of Sciences. Since 2002, he was a professor at the Department of Oriental Studies at MGIMO and a chief research fellow at the Center for East Asian and SCO Studies. In June 2000 he was awarded the rank of Ambassador Extraordinary and Plenipotentiary.

Denisov died on 7 May 2026, at the age of 84.
