= 1950 in South Korea =

- Centuries: 20th; 21st
- Decades: 1940s; 1950s; 1960s; 1970s
- See also: Other events in 1950; Years in South Korea; Timeline of Korean history 1950 in North Korea

Events from the year 1950 in South Korea.

== Incumbents ==
- President: Rhee Syng-man
- Vice President: Yi Si-yeong
- Prime Minister:
  - until 21 April: Yi Pom-sok
  - 21 April–23 November: Shin Song-mo
  - starting 23 November: Chang Myon

== Events ==
- Korean War

== Births ==
- 21 August – Seok Cheoljoo, painter

== See also ==
- List of South Korean films of 1950
- Years in Japan
- Years in North Korea
