= Occupation of Korea =

Occupation of Korea may refer to

- the colonization of Korea by the Empire of Japan between 1910 and 1945, see Korea under Japanese rule
- the occupation of the former Japanese colony Korea by the two victorious Allies of World War II Soviet Union and the USA after the surrender of Japan in 1945, see
  - Soviet Civil Administration
  - United States Army Military Government in Korea
