= Yuri Fadeyev =

Russian diplomat (1932–2014)

- Юрий Фадеев

Russian Ambassador to North Korea
- In office 24 January 1992 – 12 August 1996
- President: Boris Yeltsin
- Preceded by: Aleksandr Kapto
- Succeeded by: Valery Denisov

Personal details
- Born: 24 January 1932 Moscow, Russian SFSR, Soviet Union
- Died: 22 December 2014 (aged 82) Moscow, Russia
- Education: Moscow Institute of Oriental Studies; Russian MFA Diplomatic Academy
- Occupation: Diplomat
- Awards: Medal "For Distinguished Labour"; Medal "Veteran of Labour"

Yuri Dmitriyevich Fadeyev (Russian: Юрий Дмитриевич Фадеев; 24 January 1932 – 22 December 2014) was a Russian diplomat who served as the Russian Ambassador to North Korea from 1992 to 1996.

== Life and career ==
Fadeyev graduated from the Moscow Institute of Oriental Studies, specializing in "regional studies on Korea" (1954), the Higher Diplomatic School of the Soviet Ministry of Foreign Affairs (1965) and the Faculty of Advanced Studies at the Diplomatic Academy of the Soviet Ministry of Foreign Affairs. In 1954-1958 he worked as a translator at the Soviet Embassy in the North Korea. In 1958-1959 he was senior economist in the Department of Economics of Eastern Countries in the State Committee for Foreign Economic Relations under the Council of Ministers of the Soviet Union. In 1959-1963 - attaché, third secretary of the Soviet Embassy in North Korea. In 1965-1973 he served as first secretary, counselor of the Soviet Embassy in North Korea. In 1973-1984 he served as Advisor to the 1st Far Eastern Department, Head of the Korean Sector, Deputy Head of the Department of the Soviet Ministry of Foreign Affairs. In 1984-1987 he served as Senior Advisor to the Permanent Mission of the Soviet Union to the UN in New York. In 1987-1990 he served as Deputy Head of the Department of Socialist Countries of Asia of the Soviet Ministry of Foreign Affairs. In 1990-1992 he served as Deputy Head of the Department of Far East and Indochina Countries of the Soviet, and following the dissolution of the Soviet Union, Russia Ministry of Foreign Affairs. On January 24, 1992 he was bestowed the rank of Ambassador Extraordinary and Plenipotentiary and was concurrently appointed to the Ambassador Extraordinary and Plenipotentiary of the Russian Federation to the DPRK, a position in which he served until 12 August 1996. In 1996-1998 he served as Ambassador-at-Large of the Russian Ministry of Foreign Affairs, Chairman of the Russian delegation to the intergovernmental Joint Russian-Korean Demarcation Commission. He retired from duty in 1998.

Fadeyev died in Moscow on 22 December 2014, at the age of 83. He was married and had two daughters.
