= 1946 in North Korea =

- Centuries: 20th; 21st
- Decades: 1940s; 1950s; 1960s
- See also: Other events in 1946; Years in North Korea; Timeline of Korean history

The following list shows events that happened during 1946 in North Korea, then governed by the Provisional People's Committee of North Korea and the People's Committee of North Korea.

== Incumbents ==
=== Soviet Civil Administration in Korea ===
- Head Administrator (de facto):
  - Terentii Shtykov
- Head of the Civil Administration:
  - Andrei Romanenko

=== People's Committee of North Korea ===
- Chairman: Kim Il Sung

=== People's Republic of Korea ===
- President: Syngman Rhee (until 1946)
- Chairman of the National People's Representative Conference: Lyuh Woon-hyung (until 1946)

== Events ==
- Kim Il Sung, in March 1946, issued his 20-Point Platform.
- An eight-hour workday was implemented in June 1946.
- In August, 90% of the country's major industrial facilities were nationalized.
- In December, farmers were mandated to provide 25% of their harvest as an agricultural tax.
- 1946 North Korean local elections
- 1st Congress of the Workers' Party of North Korea

== See also ==
- List of Korean films of 1919–1948
