= 1952 in Korea =

1952 in Korea may refer to:

- 1952 in North Korea
- 1952 in South Korea
