= Aleksandr Kapto =

Russian sociologist and diplomat (1933–2020)

- Александр Капто
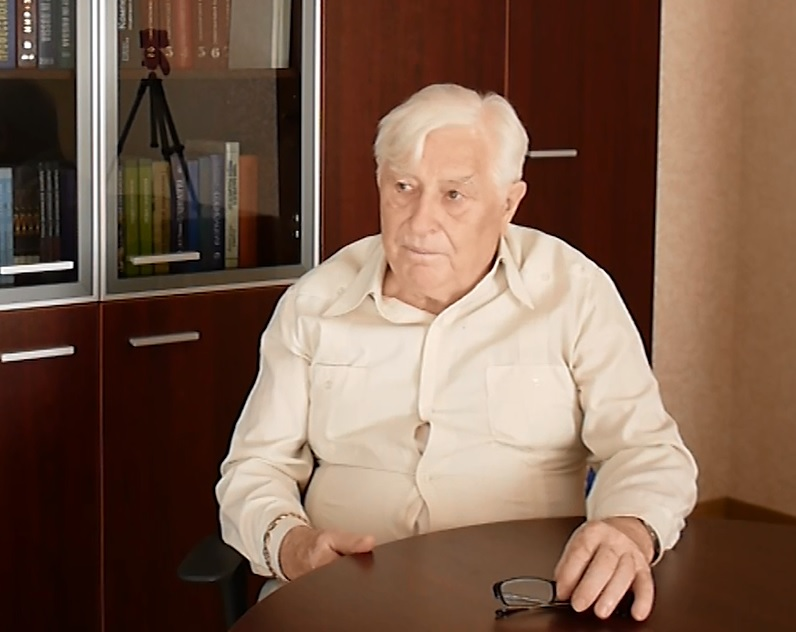
- Kapto in 2014

Russian Ambassador to North Korea
- In office 10 October 1990 – 24 January 1992
- President: Mikhail Gorbachev; Boris Yeltsin
- Preceded by: Gennady Bartoshevich
- Succeeded by: Yuri Fadeyev

Personal details
- Born: Aleksandr Semyonovich Kapto; 14 April 1933 Vyshchetarasivka, Tomakivka Raion, Dnipropetrovsk Oblast, Ukrainian SSR, Soviet Union
- Died: 19 April 2020 (aged 87) Moscow, Russia
- Education: Dnipropetrovsk University
- Occupation: Diplomat, author
- Aleksandr Kapto's voice Recorded 15 May 2012

Aleksandr Semyonovich Kapto (Russian: Александр Семёнович Капто; 14 April 1933 – 19 April 2020) was a Soviet, Russian and Ukrainian sociologist, political scientist, diplomat, journalist and politician. He earned a philosophy degree in 1967 and his Ph.D. in 1985. In 2008 he was head of the UNESCO International Board of the Institute of Socio-Political Research under the Russian Academy of Sciences (RAS).

== Education ==
Kapto graduated from the History and Philosophy Faculty of the Dnipropetrovsk University in 1957 with a philosophy degree and specialization in "Ukrainian Philology", studying the problems of war and peace, international relations, political sociology, sociology of morality and education, social activity of youths, and professional ethics.

== Career ==
In addition to his duties with UNESCO, Kapto served as Chairman of the Expert Council under the Top Certifying Commission for Political Science; Chairman of the Council for Defending a Doctoral Thesis under the Institute of Socio-Political Research (ISPR RAS) (sociology of spiritual life and management); Vice-President of the Academy of Social Sciences; and was a member of the Presidium of the Academy of Political Science. He was a Soviet Ambassador to Cuba from 1985-9, and the last Soviet and first Russian Ambassador to the Democratic People's Republic of Korea.

== Writing career ==
Kapto was a member of the Union of Russian Writers. In 1971 and 1974 he received a first-degree diploma certificate for winning the All-Union Competition for the best popular science works.

== Awards and prizes ==
- Three Orders of the Red Banner of Labour
- Order of Friendship of Peoples
- Order of Honour (2003)
- Cuban Order of Solidarity
- S. Vavilov Medal for Outstanding Contribution to Spreading Scientific Knowledge, Enlightened and Humanitarian Activities
- Honorary Citizen of Denver

== Bibliography ==
- Social activity as a moral trait of an individual. Kiev, 1968.
- Public activity of youths. Moscow, 1971.
- Class education: methodology, theory, practice. M., 1985.
- Political memoirs. Moscow, 1996.
- Nobel peacemakers. Moscow, 2002.
- Encyclopedia of the world. Moscow, 2002 and 2005.
- From the bellicose culture to the culture of peace. Moscow, 2002.

== See also ==
- Institute of Socio-Political Research

== References and sources ==
- A. Kapto’s biography (in Russian)
