= Aleksandr Matsegora =

Russian diplomat (1955–2025)

Alexander Matsegora
- Александр Мацегора

Russian Ambassador to North Korea
- In office 26 December 2014 – 6 December 2025
- President: Vladimir Putin
- Preceded by: Aleksandr Timonin
- Succeeded by: Andrei Podyolyshev

Personal details
- Born: 21 November 1955 Odessa, Ukrainian SSR, Soviet Union
- Died: 6 December 2025 (aged 70) Pyongyang, North Korea
- Education: MGIMO
- Occupation: Diplomat
- Awards: Order of Alexander Nevsky; Order of Friendship; DPRK Order of Friendship

Aleksandr Ivanovich Matsegora (Russian: Александр Иванович Мацегора; 21 November 1955 – 6 December 2025) was a Soviet and Russian diplomat who served as Ambassador of Russia to North Korea from 2014 until his death in 2025.

== Life and career ==
Matsegora was born in 1955, in Odessa, Ukrainian SSR and the USSR.

In 1978, he graduated from the Faculty of International Economic Relations of the Moscow State Institute of International Relations (MGIMO) of the Soviet Ministry of Foreign Affairs. He was in diplomatic service from 1999 onwards. From 2005 to 2006, he served as head of department in the First Department of Asia of the Russian Ministry of Foreign Affairs. From 2006 to 2011, he served as Minister-Counselor of the Embassy of Russia in the DPRK. From 2011 to 2014, he served as deputy director of the First Department of Asia of the Russian Ministry of Foreign Affairs.

From 26 December 2014 until his death, he served as Extraordinary and Plenipotentiary Ambassador of the Russian Federation to North Korea. He presented his credentials on 9 March 2015. In December 2024, he hosted a reception to mark the signing of the North Korean–Russian Treaty on Comprehensive Strategic Partnership. He spoke Russian, Korean and English.

Matsegora died in the North Korean capital Pyongyang on 6 December 2025, at the age of 70, having made his last public appearance on 2 December. A close link to North Korean leader Kim Jong Un, his death was characterised as sudden, and his cause of death was undisclosed by the Ministry of Foreign Affairs.
