= Gennady Bartoshevich =

Soviet politician (1934–1993)

- Геннадий Бартошевич

Soviet Ambassador to North Korea
- In office 13 October 1987 – 10 October 1990
- President: Mikhail Gorbachev
- Preceded by: Nikolai Shubnikov
- Succeeded by: Aleksandr Kapto

Mayor of Minsk
- In office 1977
- Preceded by: Mikhail Kovalev
- Succeeded by: Stanislau Lukashevich

Personal details
- Born: 24 September 1934 Minsk, Byelorussian SSR, Soviet Union
- Died: 8 October 1993 (aged 59) Minsk, Belarus
- Resting place: Eastern Cemetery, Minsk
- Party: CPSU
- Education: Belarusian Politechnical Institute
- Occupation: Politician, diplomat
- Awards: Order of Lenin; Order of the October Revolution; Order of the Red Banner of Labour; Order of the Badge of Honour

Gennady Georgyevich Bartoshevich (Russian: Геннадий Георгиевич Бартошевич, Belarusian: Генадзь Георгіевіч Барташівіч (Hienadz Bartashevich); 24 September 1934 - 8 October 1993) was a Soviet and Belarusian party and government figure, diplomat, and second secretary of the Central Committee of the Communist Party of Byelorussia (1983–1987). was a Russian diplomat who served as the Soviet Ambassador to North Korea from 1987 to 1990.

== Biography ==
Born into Belarusian family he was member of the Communist Party of the Soviet Union since 1957. He began his career in 1950 as a turner at the October Revolution Minsk Machine-Tool Plant (MSZOR). In 1954–1957 he served in the Soviet Armed Forces. From 1962, he was an engineer-technologist, head of a bureau, deputy head of a department at MSZOR. In 1963, he graduated from the Belarusian Polytechnic Institute, and in 1977, from the Minsk Higher Party School. Since 1967, he has been the secretary of the Molodechno city committee of the Communist Party of Byelorussia, and chairman of the executive committee of the Minsk City Council of People's Deputies. In 1977-1983 he served as First Secretary of the Minsk City Committee of the Communist Party of Belarus, In 1983-1987 - Second Secretary of the Central Committee of the Communist Party of Belarus, In 1987-1991 - Ambassador Extraordinary and Plenipotentiary of the USSR to the Democratic People's Republic of Korea. In 1993 - Ambassador at Large of the Ministry of Foreign Affairs of the Republic of Belarus.

Member of the Central Committee of the CPSU in (1986–1991). Deputy of the Council of Nationalities of the Supreme Soviet of the USSR of the 10th and 11th convocations (1979–1989) from the Byelorussian SSR. Central Committee and Bureau of the Central Committee of the Communist Party of Belarus (1983–1987), deputy of the Supreme Soviet of the BSSR (1975–1980, 1985–1990).
