= Vladimir Razuvayev =

- Владимир Разуваев

2nd Ambassador of the Soviet Union to North Korea
- In office 14 December 1950 – 31 July 1953
- Premier: Joseph Stalin
- Preceded by: Terentii Shtykov
- Succeeded by: Sergey Suzdalev

Personal details
- Born: 3 January 1900 Shchigrovsky Uyezd, Kursk Governorate, Russian Empire
- Died: 5 August 1980 (aged 80) Moscow, Russian SFSR, Soviet Union
- Resting place: Tbilisi, Georgian SSR, Soviet Union
- Party: Communist Party of the Soviet Union
- Education: Frunze Military Academy; General Staff Academy

Military service
- Allegiance: Soviet Union
- Branch/service: Red Army
- Years of service: 1921−1968
- Rank: Lieutenant general
- Battles/wars: World War II

Vladimir Nikolayevich Razuvayev (Russian: Владимир Николаевич Разуваев; January 3, 1900, Alekseyevka village, Kursk Governorate – August 5, 1980, Moscow) was Soviet military officer and diplomat who served as the Soviet Ambassador Extraordinary and Plenipotentiary to North Korea.

== Biography ==
He joined the Red Army in 1921 and served in a Red Army barrier detachment at the end of the Russian Civil War. He became a member of the Communist Party in 1924. He graduated from the Frunze Military Academy (1934) and the General Staff Academy (1939). He was promoted to Colonel and Major General (May 13, 1942).

During the war with Winter War, he served as Chief of Staff of the 9th Army, after which he held the position of Deputy Chief of Staff of the Transcaucasian Military District.

=== Great Patriotic War ===
During the Great Patriotic War, he held various positions:

In 1941, he served as Deputy Chief of Staff of the Transcaucasian Front. From March 1942, he served as Chief of the Operations Department and Deputy Chief of Staff of the Crimean Front.

In 1942, he was Chief of the Operations Department, Deputy Chief of Staff of the North Caucasus Front, and promoted to Major General.

Until October 1942, he was Chief of the Operations Department and Deputy Chief of Staff of the Black Sea Group of Forces. From October 1942 to January 1943, he was Chief of Staff of the 37th Army. From January to April 1943, he was Chief of Staff of the 44th Army. From April to August 1943, he was Chief of Staff of the 2nd Guards Army. From August to November 1943, he was Chief of Staff of the 44th Army. From November 1943 to February 1944, he was Deputy Commander of the 28th Army. From February 1944 to January 1945, he was Deputy Commander of the 51st Army. From January to July 1945, he commanded the 1st Shock Army. Having held senior staff and command positions, he participated in the development and execution of the Rostov, Donbass, Melitopol, and Nikopol-Krivoy Rog offensive operations, the liberation of Crimea, and the blockade of the Wehrmacht's Courland group of troops in the Baltics.

He supervised the transport of Soviet troops across the Syvash to the Syvash bridgehead in preparation for the Crimean offensive (February–March 1944).

On April 13, 1944, he led a strike group of troops in the operation to liberate the capital of Crimea, Simferopol.

He participated in the 1945 Moscow Victory Parade.

=== Post-war career ===
From July 9, 1945, to February 4, 1946, he was Commander of the Minsk Military District. From July 1946 to 1950, he was First Deputy Chief Military Inspector of the Soviet Armed Forces. From 1946 to 1950, he was a Deputy of the Soviet of the Union of the Supreme Soviet of the USSR of the 2nd convocation (elected in the Molodechno Region of the Byelorussian SSR). From December 14, 1950, to July 31, 1953, he was Soviet Ambassador Extraordinary and Plenipotentiary to North Korea, and simultaneously Chief Military Advisor to the Commander-in-Chief of the Korean People's Army, Kim Il Sung. From October 1954 to October 1956, he was Chief of Staff of the Soviet Air Defence Forces.

From October 1956 to September 1968, he was Head of the Air Defense Department of the Military Academy of the General Staff. He played a significant role during the Korean War: he led Soviet military advisers in the DPRK, participated in the planning and execution of military operations, coordinated the supply of military equipment to the country, and ensured the implementation of Soviet foreign policy interests during the conflict.

He died on August 5, 1980, in Moscow. He was buried in Tbilisi.

== Awards ==
- Order of Lenin (May 6, 1946)
- 5 Orders of the Red Banner (December 13, 1942, January 4, 1943, November 3, 1944, May 17, 1951, December 27, 1951)
- Order of Suvorov, 1st Class (May 16, 1944)
- Order of Suvorov, 2nd Class (June 29, 1945)
- Order of Kutuzov, 2nd Class (October 2, 1943)
- 3 Orders of the Red Star (May 21, 1940, February 22, 1968, January 15, 1980)
- Medals
- Order of the National Flag (DPRK)
- Order of Freedom and Independence
- Medal of Sino-Soviet Friendship
