= Sinuiju Incident =

November 1945 anti-communist clashes in Korea

- Native name: 신의주 사건
- Location: Sinuiju, North Pyŏngan Province, Soviet Civil Administration
- Date: 23 November 1945 (80 years ago)
- Target: Anti-communist students and Christian leaders
- Attack type: Mass murder, mass shooting
- Deaths: 15–100
- Injuries: 168–350
- Perpetrators: Red Army; Korean Communists
- Motive: Suppression of anti-communist uprising

The Sinuiju Incident (Korean: 신의주 사건; Hancha: 新義州學生事件 or 신의주 학생사건; 新義州學生事件; lit. 'Sinuiju Student Incident' or 신의주 반공학생의거 "Anti communist student movement in Sinuiju") was an uprising of students and Christian leaders in the port city of Sinuiju, North Pyŏngan Province, Soviet Civil Administration on November 23, 1945. The city of Sinuiju is now in North Korea. It marked the peak of social resistance against the communist regime in the formative period of North Korea, during the Soviet occupation from 1945 to 1948.

Factors leading to the incident included resistance to the violence of the initial Soviet occupation forces and to practices of food procurement by the Red Army, the predominance of communists in the People's Committees, and the deterioration of the elites' social status.

It resulted in high levels of political and social suppression on the part of the Korean Communists and the Soviet occupation. Consequently, the incident accelerated the consolidation of communist power, allowing the Korean Communist Party (KCP) to develop a more solid, Soviet-backed communist regime. Some scholars credit Kim Il Sung, who later became the first Supreme Leader of the North Korea, for resolving the incident.

== Background ==
The incident occurred in the months following the liberation of Korea from Japanese colonial occupation in 1945. The process of establishing a new regime in the North resulted in various forms of conflict and resistance among the parties and the population. Immediately following the withdrawal of Japanese occupation forces, Korean elders in Sinuiju released the colonial prisoners and established an autonomous provisional committee (wiwonhoe) to administer local affairs. The committee members were predominantly conservative nationalists, and for two weeks after the surrender of Japan, the people of Sinuiju had direct control of their own affairs. The entry of the Allied troops, however, completely changed the power dynamics.

The Red Army quickly dissolved the committee and established a new People's Political Committee (PC) that favored Communist leaders over the conservative nationalists of the wiwonhoe. The dissolution of the wiwonhoe led to the formation of the Christian Social Democratic Party (CSDP,기독교사회민주당) by Presbyterian pastors in Sinuiju. The Soviet authorities, despite their initial toleration of religious groups, categorized the CSDP as bourgeois and pressured the party to drop "Christian" from its name and merge with the Joseon Minjudang (Korean Democratic Party or KDP), which was led by the Christian political leader Cho Man-sik.

In addition, Soviet authorities were met with resistance by the Korean elites – landlords, former colonial functionaries, and other figures who had previously enjoyed high social status during the Japanese occupation. Many of the landed elite with strong business influences were Christian nationalists. Farmers who were under Soviet protection gradually began to resist the landlords and the former agricultural structure, which aggravated the already heightened tensions between farmers and the landed elite.

Agricultural problems also exacerbated the problems of the occupation period. Tensions between the landlords and the farmers disrupted grain production at harvest time, resulting in major grain shortages. In addition, the Red Army's drain of foodstuffs from the city worsened the hunger situation. People were further agitated by the Soviets' pillaging of factories and poor railroad transport.

In addition, the people of North Pyeongan province were angered by the Red Army's suppression of Korean troops returning from China. Approximately two thousand Korean Volunteer Army (KVA) troops arrived in Andong, a Chinese city directly across the Yalu River from Sinuiju. In October 1945, the Chinese Kuomintang (KMT) successfully pushed the Chinese Communist Party (CCP) out of Andong, which intensified the urgency of the entry of KVA troops into Sinuiju. In mid-November, the KVA reentered Korea, but the Soviet authorities confiscated all their weapons and sent many of them back to Manchuria. This further fueled the resistance against the Soviets.

== Incident ==
All of these factors culminated in the Sinuiju Incident on November 23, 1945. The incident was sparked by the People's Committee's removal of a middle school principal—Principal Chu—in nearby Yongampo who had previously expressed criticism of the aggressive Soviet troops and the Korean communists. Like other schools in the region, the town's middle school was struggling from a lack of teachers and resources as well as strict Soviet oversight. Upon hearing the news of his arrest, pupils from various nearby schools held an after-school meeting to criticize the arrest and the Korean communists. Prompted by a suggestion to meet Yi Yonghup(이용흡), who was chairman of the Yongampo Council of People's Commissars at the time, the students went out to meet him. When the students were unable to find Yi, a rumor spread that he was running away to Sinuiju. In response, the students all gathered at Sinuiju to wait for him. A pro-Soviet farmers' union violently suppressed the students, who returned home determined to strengthen their resistance efforts.

Several hundred students from seven different schools gathered in front of the former colonial courthouse in Sinuiju to protest the KCP's, and consequently the Soviet authorities', interference in the education system. The protest was influenced and fueled by Christian leaders. The Soviets attempted, without success, to keep Christian pastors from supporting or defending the students by dissolving local religious organizations. In response to the protest, Korean communists and Red Army soldiers fired into the crowd, killing about two dozen and wounding hundreds. Rumors of the Sinuiju incident spread to other parts of North Korea and sparked anti-Soviet and anticommunist demonstrations.

== Aftermath ==
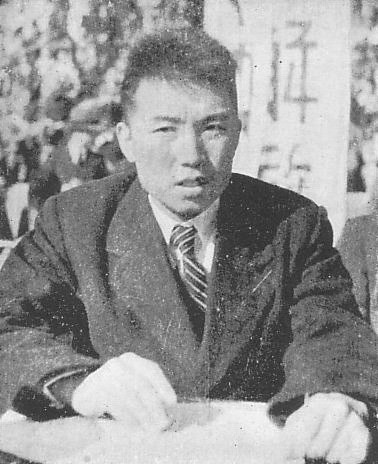
Kim Il Sung in 1946

With regards to the casualties that resulted from Sinuiju, US intelligence services showed estimates of 15–24 student deaths and 168–350 injuries while Soviet military reports showed approximately 100 student deaths. The local communist and Soviet authorities did not acknowledge the deaths of the students; rather, they attempted to remove all evidence of the incident. In addition, they arrested many individuals who were considered figures of political dissent, such as Ham Seok-heon, a Christian leader and the head of education in the Provincial People's Committee.

=== Kim Il Sung's visit ===
Some scholars of North Korea have credited Kim Il Sung for resolving the Sinuiju Incident. Kim flew into Sinuiju within days of the incident and held a "citizens' assembly" (시민대회), during which he denounced the incident and also made remarks on the "rogues lurking in the Communist Party and government organs." This was the first recorded criticism of the party by Kim. Kim utilized the Sinuiju Incident as an opportunity to promulgate nationalist propaganda. In addition, he stressed his own anti-Japanese, communist past and urged students to emulate his nationalistic efforts. Through the Sinuiju Incident, Kim realized that the KCP should not alienate certain groups of people, especially the youth. Various policy changes were implemented thereafter. The Korean Communists were thus able to establish stronger control in the aftermath of Sinuiju.

== Historical significance ==
The Sinuiju Incident was the most severe representation of social resistance against the North Korean regime during the first few months after liberation. Student and Christian participation in the incident showed that cooperation between Communist and democratic parties was not plausible. It led the Soviet Union, Kim Il Sung, and other Korean communists to implement policies that minimized dissent throughout North Korea. In addition, the incident had a significant impact on shaping Kim's political rhetoric and led to his first-ever inspection tour. Consequently, it accelerated the consolidation of communist power, allowing the KCP to develop a stronger regime. Ultimately, the KCP's centralizing power would later survive and outlast the Korean War.

== Commemoration in South Korea ==
In 1956, South Korea passed the law that designates the day of the incident November 23 as the "Day of the Anti-communist student" to rise anti communist sentiment among south Korean students. In the 12th celebration of the day in 1968, the 12 m tower of student anti communism was constructed by the Sinuiju memorial institute at the Anti communist federation square (The square for the Korean anti communist federation now known as the Korea Freedom Federation located in Jangchung-dong) which had the remains of Park Tae-geun who participated in the incident. The day was abolished in 1973.

== Bibliography ==
- Armstrong, Charles K. (2013). The North Korean Revolution: 1945–1950. Ithaca: Cornell University Press. ISBN 978-0-8014-6879-7.
- Cathcart, Adam; Kraus, Charles (2008). "Peripheral Influence: The Sinuiju Incident of 1945 and the Impact of Soviet Occupation in North Korea". The Journal of Korean Studies. 13 (1): 1–27. doi:10.1353/jks.2008.0002. JSTOR 41490245. S2CID 144775147.
- Edelstein, David M. (2008). Occupational Hazards: Success and Failure in Military Occupation. Ithaca: Cornell University Press. ISBN 978-0-8014-4615-3.
- Hwang, Kyung Moon (2010). A History of Korea. New York: Palgrave Macmillan. ISBN 978-0-230-20546-8.
- Lankov, Andrei (2002). From Stalin to Kim Il Sung: The Formation of North Korea, 1945–1960. Rutgers University Press. ISBN 978-0-8135-3117-5.
