= Valery Sukhinin =

Russian diplomat (born 1950)

- Валерий Сухинин

Russian Ambassador to North Korea
- In office 20 December 2006 – 5 April 2012
- President: Vladimir Putin
- Preceded by: Andrei Karlov
- Succeeded by: Aleksandr Timonin

Personal details
- Born: 16 January 1950 (age 76) Moscow, Russian SFSR, Soviet Union
- Education: Kim Il Sung University; Moscow State Institute of International Relations
- Occupation: Diplomat
- Awards: Medal of the Order "For Merit to the Fatherland"; DPRK Order of Friendship

Valery Yevgenyevich Sukhinin (Russian: Валерий Евгеньевич Сухинин; born 16 January 1950) is a Russian diplomat and Koreanist who served as the Russian Ambassador to North Korea from 2012 to 2014.

== Biography ==
He graduated from the Faculty of Korean Philology at Kim Il Sung University (1973) and the Korean Department of the Institute of Asian and African Countries at Moscow State University (1976). Has been in diplomatic service since 1973. Speaks Korean and English. In 1973-1978 he served as a Referent, Attaché of the Soviet Embassy in the DPRK. In 1978-1985 he was served as a Junior Referent of the Department of the CPSU Central Committee for Relations with Communist and Workers' Parties of Socialist Countries. In 1985-1992 he served as First Secretary, advisor to the Soviet Embassy in North Korea. following the dissolution of the Soviet Union, in 1992-1995, he served as Advisor and Senior Advisor to the First Asian Department of the Russian Foreign Ministry. In 1995-2000 he served as Counselor, Counselor-Minister of the Russian Embassy in South Korea. In 2001-2003 he served as Head of the Korea Department of the First Asian Department of the Russian Foreign Ministry. In 2003-2004 he served as Deputy Director of the First Asian Department of the Russian Foreign Ministry, simultaneously Deputy Head of the Russian delegation at the Six-party talks on the nuclear problem of the Korean Peninsula. In 2004-2006 he served as Counselor-Minister of the Russian Embassy in South Korea. From August to December 2006 he served as Ambassador-at-Large of the Russian Foreign Ministry, Deputy Head of the Russian delegation at the six-party talks on the nuclear problem of the Korean Peninsula. From December 20, 2006 to April 5, 2012 he served as the Ambassador Extraordinary and Plenipotentiary of the Russian Federation to the DPRK. He retired in 2012.

Along with his diplomatic career, in 1992-1995 and 2001-2004 he taught Korean at MGIMO. He holds the academic title of associate professor in the Department of Oriental Languages (1995). From 2012 to the present, he has been teaching Korean at MGIMO, and since September 2013, he has been the head of the Korean language section.
