= Andrei Karlov =

Russian diplomat (1954–2016)

Andrei Karlov HRF
- Андрей Карлов
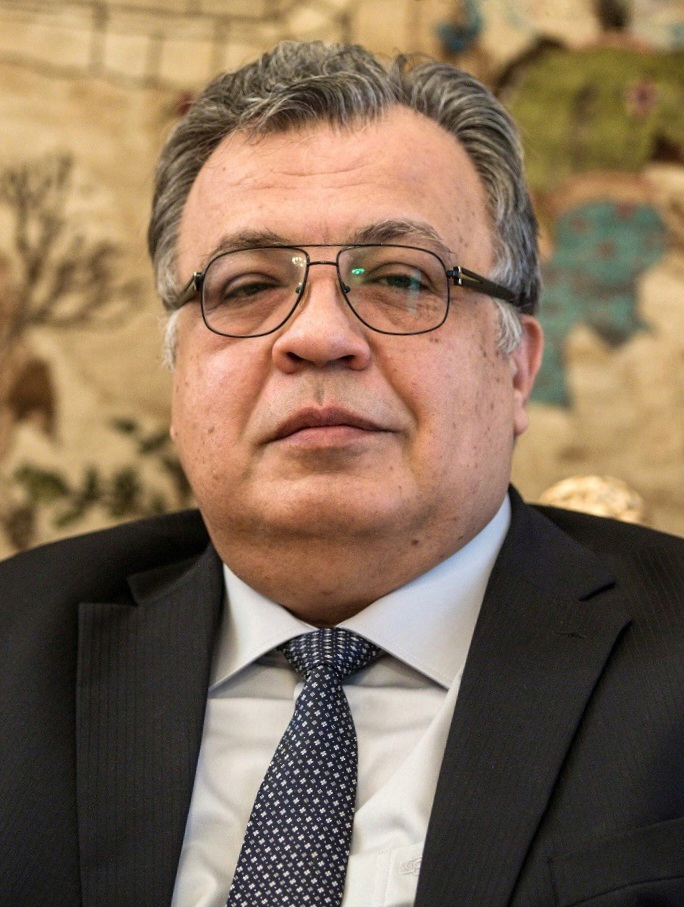

Russian Ambassador to Turkey
- In office 12 July 2013 – 19 December 2016
- President: Vladimir Putin
- Preceded by: Vladimir Ivanovsky
- Succeeded by: Alexei Yerkhov

Russian Ambassador to North Korea
- In office 9 July 2001 – 20 December 2006
- President: Vladimir Putin
- Preceded by: Valery Denisov
- Succeeded by: Valery Sukhinin

Personal details
- Born: Andrei Gennadyevich Karlov; 4 February 1954 Moscow, Soviet Union
- Died: 19 December 2016 (aged 62) Ankara, Turkey
- Cause of death: Assassination
- Spouse: Marina Mikhailovna (m. 1975)
- Children: 1
- Education: Moscow State Institute of International Relations
- Occupation: Diplomat
- Awards: Hero of the Russian Federation (posthumously)

Andrei Gennadyevich Karlov (Russian: Андрей Геннадьевич Карлов; 4 February 1954 – 19 December 2016) was a Russian diplomat who served as the Russian ambassador to Turkey and earlier as the Russian ambassador to North Korea.

On the evening of 19 December 2016, while speaking at an art gallery exhibition in Ankara, Turkey, he was assassinated by Mevlüt Mert Altıntaş, an off-duty Turkish policeman.

== Early life and education ==
Andrei Gennadyevich Karlov was born in Moscow on 4 February 1954 to Gennady Karlov and Maria Alexandrovna. He also had a sister named Yelena Shirankova who was 6 years younger than him. In 1968, Karlov's father died at the age of 37 from heart failure when Karlov was 14 years old.

In 1976, Karlov graduated from the Moscow State Institute of International Relations. That same year, he joined the diplomatic service.

He was also fluent in Korean and English.

== Career ==
In 1992, he graduated from the Diplomatic Academy of the Russian Foreign Ministry. He was fluent in Korean, and served in different roles in the Soviet embassy in North Korea from 1979 to 1984, and 1986 to 1991. Between 1992 and 1997 he worked in the Russian embassy in South Korea, and served as Russia's ambassador to North Korea from June 2001 to December 2006. While serving as ambassador to North Korea, he was instrumental in the building of the Church of the Life-Giving Trinity, a Russian Orthodox church in Pyongyang, through discussions with Kim Jong-il. The church was consecrated in 2006.

From 2006 to 2008, Karlov served as Deputy Director of the Consular Department of the Russian Foreign Ministry. He was later promoted to director of the department and served from January 2009 until December 2012. Later, he was appointed ambassador to Turkey in July 2013.

Karlov was ambassador to Turkey during a tumultuous period between the two countries. Russia and Turkey experienced their worst diplomatic crisis in recent years following the shooting down of a Russian jet in November 2015, after Turkey claimed it had violated its airspace. Russia–Turkey relations were severely strained after the incident, with Russia posing economic sanctions and travel restrictions for its citizens. Karlov blamed Turkey for the crisis, and it was not until June 2016 that diplomatic relations were normalized. During an interview two months after the incident, Karlov also claimed there was no evidence that Russian warplanes were bombing civilians in Syria.

== Assassination ==
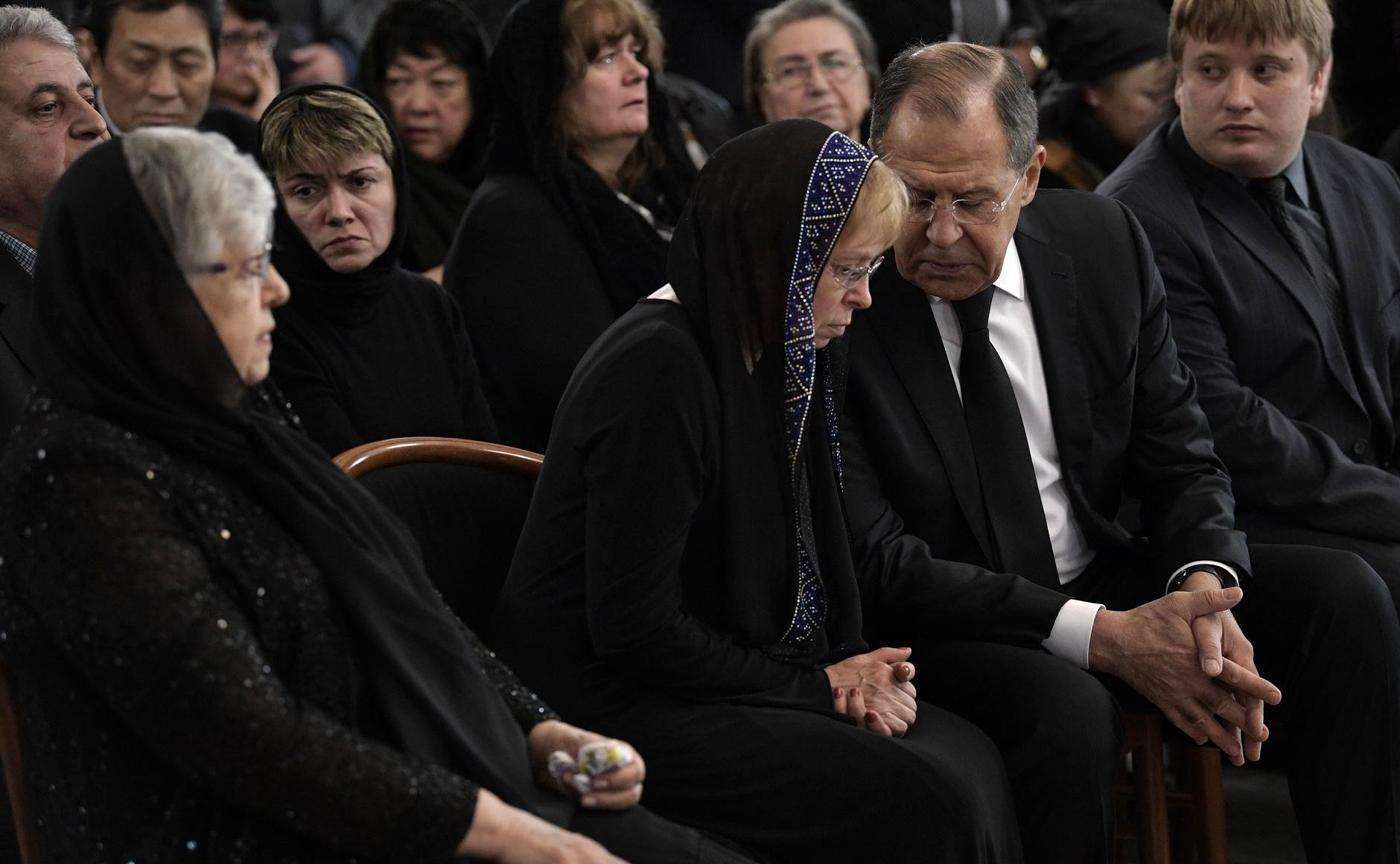
Karlov's widow (centre), his mother (left), his son (far right) and Russian foreign minister Sergey Lavrov (right) during the funeral ceremony at the Cathedral of Christ the Saviour in Moscow, 22 December 2016

On 19 December 2016, at 20:15, Karlov was shot and fatally wounded by Mevlüt Mert Altıntaş, a 22-year-old off-duty Turkish police officer, at an art exhibition in Ankara, Turkey. The attacker, who was dressed in a suit and tie, opened fire at Karlov at point-blank range while the ambassador was delivering his speech in front of journalists, fatally wounding the ambassador and injuring several others. The attacker gained access to the gallery after he showed his police ID to security guards.

A video of the attack showed the assassin crying out: "Don't forget Aleppo, don't forget Syria!" and "Allahu Akbar" (God is Greatest) while holding a gun in one hand and waving the other in the air in the tawhid salute. The assailant shouted in Arabic and Turkish. Altıntaş was subsequently shot by Turkish security forces. Both were rushed to hospital, but they died from their injuries.

The assassination took place after a long period of highly polarized and incited political atmosphere in Turkey, and after several days of protests by Islamist elements of the Turkish public against Russian involvement in the Syrian Civil War and the battle over Aleppo, as well as recent negotiations between Russian and Turkish governments for a ceasefire. The Russian president Vladimir Putin described the assassination as an attempt to damage Turkish–Russian ties. Both Turkish and Russian officials declared the Gülen movement to be responsible for the assassination. Meanwhile the Army of Conquest, which includes the Al-Nusra Front, claimed responsibility for the assassination, according to Russian News Agency TASS.

Andrei Karlov is the fourth Russian ambassador to have died in the line of duty since the 1829 murder of Alexander Griboyedov in Tehran. Before Karlov, Soviet diplomat Vatslav Vorovsky was assassinated in Lausanne in 1923, and Pyotr Voykov, a Soviet envoy to Poland, was also shot to death in Warsaw in 1927.

Zaslon (Russian: «Заслон») was criticized for lack of proper protection of Ambassador Karlov following his 19 December 2016 assassination.

== Personal life ==
In 1975, Karlov married Marina Mikhailovna and together they had a son Gennady who was born a few years later. Gennady graduated from the Moscow State Institute of International Relations and served in the consulate department in the Russian embassy in North Korea. Andrei Karlov was an Orthodox Christian.

== Awards and legacy ==
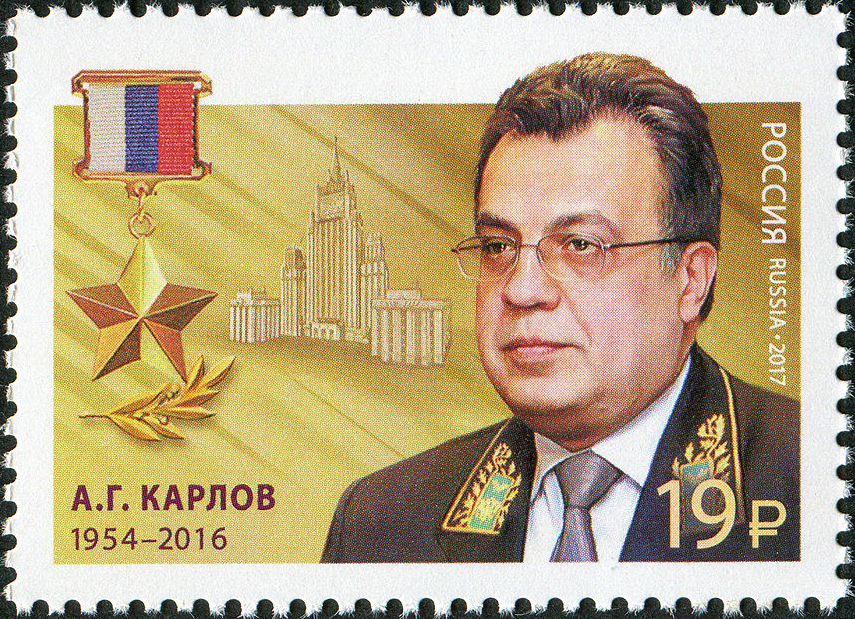
Karlov on a Russian stamp issued in 2017

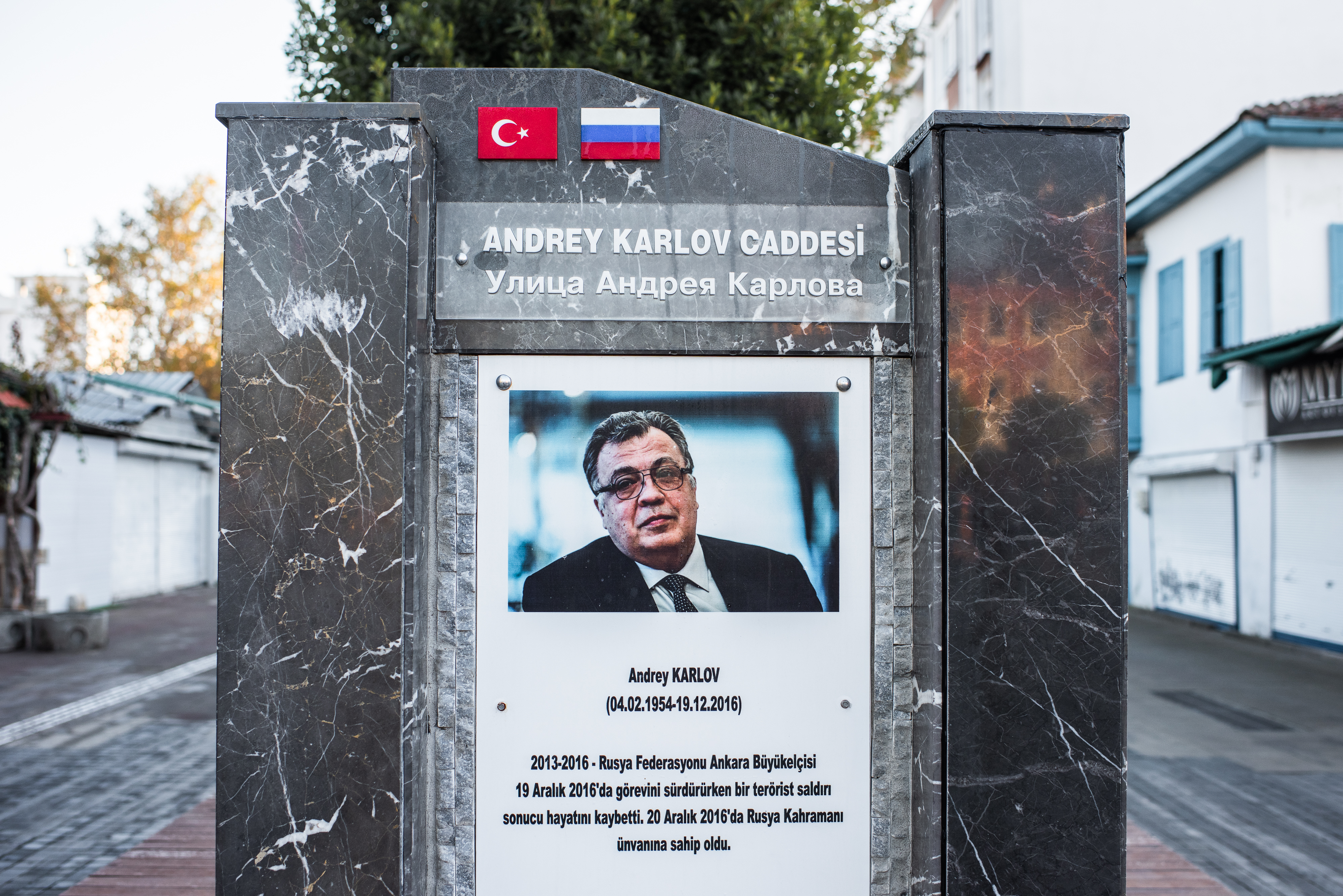
Monument to Andrey Karlov on Andrey Karlov Street in Demre, Turkey

Karlov was awarded the Order of Seraphim of Sarov, 3rd degree, for his role in establishing a Russian Orthodox Church in Pyongyang while ambassador to North Korea. On 21 December 2016, two days after his death, he was posthumously awarded the title of Hero of the Russian Federation by the Kremlin.

The city of Ankara announced that the exhibition hall where Karlov was assassinated would be renamed in his memory. Turkish Foreign Minister Mevlüt Çavuşoğlu said Karyağdı Street in Ankara – where the Russian embassy is located – will also be similarly renamed after Karlov. Russian President Vladimir Putin announced that he has requested that the Ministry of Foreign Affairs "make a proposal for the perpetuation of [Karlov's] memory".

== See also ==
- Russia–Turkey relations
- List of Heroes of the Russian Federation
