= 1948 in South Korea =

- Centuries: 20th; 21st
- Decades: 1940s; 1950s; 1960s
- See also: Other events in 1948; Years in South Korea; Timeline of Korean history 1948 in North Korea

Events from the year 1948 in South Korea.

== Incumbents ==
=== United States Army Military Government in Korea ===
- Military governor:
  - William F. Dean (until 15 August)

=== Republic of Korea ===
- President: Syngman Rhee (starting 15 August)
- Vice President: Yi Si-yeong (starting 24 July)
- Prime Minister: Yi Pom-sok (starting 31 July)

== Events ==
- August 1945 – 1948 – Due to Korea being under Japanese rule during World War II, Korea was considered an Axis belligerent against the Allies. The surrender of Japan led to the division of Korea into southern and northern occupation zones. The southern being administered by the United States and the area north of the 38th parallel being administered by the Soviet Union. The division was to be temporary and was meant to return a unified Korea back to its people after the United States, United Kingdom, Soviet Union, and China could implement a single government for Korea. Due to differing opinions between the two parties on the implementation of Joint Trusteeship over Korea, two separate governments were established in 1948 with two opposing ideologies; the Democratic People's Republic of Korea (DPRK) and the First Republic of Korea – both claiming to be the legitimate government of the entire Korean peninsula.
- January 7-UNCOK visits South Korea.
- January 30 - South Korea sends ski athletes for the 1948 Winter Olympics.
- February 7 - United strike against the UNCOK, now known as the 2/7 incident happened.
- February 26 - United Nations resolved that the votes will go on only in South Korea.
- March – land reform is enacted as a short-term measure to cease the spread of Communist influence in the U.S. zone driven by the Communist threat and expanding land redistribution in North Korea in the spring of 1946.
- April 3rd-Jeju uprising. An uprising led by communist Kim Dalsam occurred against the South Korean Interim Government (SKIG) on Cheju-do (Jejudo) Island in South Korea. Government policemen fired at the demonstrators on Cheju-do (Jejudo) Island; communist rebels attacked 12 police stations in response, which resulted in approximately 50 government policemen fatalities.
- May 10th – First general election held in a democratic manner under the United Nations' "supervision to elect the 198 members of the National Assembly". Legislative elections were held in South Korea in a U.S.-administered territory. In the National Assembly, independent candidates won 85 out of 200 seats. The National Alliance for the Rapid Realization of Korean Independence (NARRKI), led by Syngman Rhee, won 55 seats while the Korea Democratic Party (KDP) won 29 seats. The legislative elections, however, were boycotted by left-wing political groups. About 30 United Nations observers watched the elections from May 7 to May 11, 1948. About 400 U.S. military officers and government officials also watched the elections. There were approximately 600 fatalities in election-related violence between March and May 1948.
- July-National Assembly enacted a Constitution; Rhee Syngman and Yi Si-Yeong (independence fighters) elected as South Korea's first President and Vice President.
- August 12, 1948 – March 21, 1949 – John J. Muccio served as a United States Special Representative to Korea.
- August 15 – Republic of Korea (ROK) was formally established as a liberal democracy. This inherited the legitimacy of the PGK. The United Nations recognized the ROK as the only legitimate government in Korea. The Provisional Military Advisory Group (PMAG) is established by the U.S. government which "consisted of 100 U.S. military advisers commanded by Brigadier General William Lynn Roberts to train the South Korean military."
- September 9, 1948 – Democratic People's Republic of Korea (DPRK) was proclaimed as a communist country; Kim Il-sung, (officer in the Soviet Russian Army) became the President.
- 1948 – 1954 – regime of Syngman Rhee was responsible for at least 200,000 deaths through political murder and massacre; about 30,000 of those were killed due to the suppression brought upon by the Cheju Rebellion.

== Births ==
- February 2 – Kwon Yang-sook, First lady of South Korea
- March 26 – Kyung Wha Chung, Korean violinist
- May 5 – Kim Hoon, Korean novelist
- June 14 – Do-ol, Korean philosopher
- July 28 – Song Min-soon, politician
- August 26 – Jeon Tae-il, Korean worker's right activist (d. 1970)
- September 14 – Chung Mong-hun, Korean businessman (d. 2003)

== Deaths ==
- November 16-Min Yeong-chan:Korean politician. Also was an official during the Japanese colonial days.
- December 10-Na Hye-sok:Korean painter

== See also ==
- List of South Korean films of 1948
- Years in Japan
- Years in North Korea
