= List of ambassadors of Russia to North Korea =

Ambassador of the Russian Federation to the Democratic People's Republic of Korea
- Emblem of the Russian Foreign Ministry
- Incumbent; Vacant since December 6, 2025
- Ministry of Foreign Affairs; Embassy of Russia in Pyongyang
- Style: His Excellency
- Reports to: Minister of Foreign Affairs
- Seat: Pyongyang
- Appointer: President of Russia
- Term length: At the pleasure of the president
- Website: Russian Embassy in North Korea

The ambassador extraordinary and plenipotentiary of the Russian Federation to the Democratic People's Republic of Korea is the official representative of the president and the government of the Russian Federation to the supreme leader and the government of North Korea.

The ambassador and his staff work at large in the Embassy of Russia in Pyongyang. The post of Russian ambassador to North Korea is currently vacant since December 6, 2025 due to the death of Aleksandr Matsegora.

== History of diplomatic relations ==
The Russian Empire established relations with the Joseon Dynasty in 1884. However Korea was deprived of its right to conduct independent foreign policy by the Japan-Korea Treaty of 1905, while the Union of Soviet Socialist Republics (the eventual successor to the Russian Empire) did not formally recognise the Provisional Government of the Republic of Korea in exile. In 1948, three years after the end of Japanese rule in Korea, the USSR recognised only one government on the Korean Peninsula—the Democratic People's Republic of Korea, commonly North Korea. Relations continue up to the present day, with the Russian Federation as the USSR's successor state.

== List of heads of mission ==
=== Ministers from the Russian Empire to the Chosun Dynasty ===
- Karl Ivanovich Weber, appointed October 14, 1885

=== Ministers from the Russian Empire to the Korean Empire ===
- Karl Ivanovich Weber (continued from above)
- Alexey Shpeyer, appointed March 28, 1898
- Paul Pavlov, appointed December 13, 1898.

=== Ambassadors from the Soviet Union to the Democratic People's Republic of Korea (1948–1991) ===
| Name | Appointment | Credentials presented | Termination | Notes |
|---|---|---|---|---|
| Terentii Shtykov | October 16, 1948 | January 14, 1949 | December 14, 1950 | |
| Vladimir Razuvayev | December 14, 1950 | | July 31, 1953 | |
| Sergey Suzdalev | July 31, 1953 | August 28, 1953 | June 17, 1955 | |
| Vasily Ivanov | June 17, 1955 | July 26, 1955 | February 22, 1957 | |
| Aleksandr Puzanov | February 22, 1957 | April 8, 1957 | June 30, 1962 | |
| Vasily Moskovskiy | June 30, 1962 | August 13, 1962 | May 15, 1965 | |
| Andrey Gorchakov | May 15, 1965 | June 4, 1965 | April 15, 1967 | |
| Nikolai Sudarikov | April 15, 1967 | May 18, 1967 | August 8, 1974 | |
| Gleb Kriulin | August 8, 1974 | October 25, 1974 | December 24, 1982 | |
| Nikolai Shubnikov | December 24, 1982 | January 20, 1983 | October 13, 1987 | |
| Gennady Bartoshevich | October 13, 1987 | | October 10, 1990 | |
| Aleksandr Kapto | October 10, 1990 | | December 25, 1991 | |

=== Ambassadors from the Russian Federation to the Democratic People's Republic of Korea (1991–present) ===
| Name | Appointment | Credentials presented | Termination | Notes |
|---|---|---|---|---|
| Aleksandr Kapto | December 26, 1991 | | January 24, 1992 | |
| Yuri Fadeyev | January 24, 1992 | | August 12, 1996 | |
| Valery Denisov | August 12, 1996 | | July 9, 2001 | |
| Andrei Karlov | July 9, 2001 | | December 20, 2006 | |
| Valery Sukhinin | December 20, 2006 | | April 5, 2012 | |
| Aleksandr Timonin | April 5, 2012 | | December 26, 2014 | |
| Aleksandr Matsegora | December 26, 2014 | March 9, 2015 | December 6, 2025 | |
| Andrei Podyolyshev | July 28, 2026 | | | |

== See also ==
- Russia–Korea Treaty of 1884
- List of diplomatic missions in North Korea
- List of Ambassadors from Russia to South Korea
