= Sergey Suzdalev =

- Сергей Суздалев

3rd Ambassador of the Soviet Union to North Korea
- In office 31 July 1953 – 15 June 1955
- Premier: Georgy Malenkov; Nikolai Bulganin
- Preceded by: Vladimir Razuvayev
- Succeeded by: Vasily Ivanov

Personal details
- Born: 21 September 1908 Saint Petersburg, Russian Empire
- Died: 14 March 1969 (aged 60) Moscow, Soviet Union
- Resting place: Vostryakovskoye Cemetery
- Party: Communist Party of the Soviet Union
- Awards: Order of the Badge of Honour; Medal "For Labour Valour"

Sergey Petrovich Suzdalev (Russian: Сергей Петрович Суздалев; 21 September 1908 – 14 March 1969) was a Soviet diplomat and Ambassador Extraordinary and Plenipotentiary who served as the Soviet Ambassador Extraordinary and Plenipotentiary to North Korea.

== Biography ==
From 1940 he worked for the People's Commissariat of Foreign Affairs of the Soviet Union.

From 1946 to 1949, he served as Senior Assistant and Deputy Political Advisor to the Allied Council for Japan. From 1949 to 1951, he served as Advisor to the USSR Mission to the Far Eastern Commission in Washington, D.C. From July 31, 1953, to June 15, 1955, he served as Ambassador Extraordinary and Plenipotentiary of the USSR to the Democratic People's Republic of Korea. His credentials were presented on August 28, 1953. From June 18, 1955, to 1956, he served as Advisor and Deputy Head of the Far Eastern Department of the USSR Ministry of Foreign Affairs. From 1957 to 1958, he was Deputy Secretary General of the USSR Ministry of Foreign Affairs. From 1958 to 1963, he was Minister-Counselor of the USSR Embassy in Japan. From 1963 to 1969, he was Deputy Head of the First African Department of the Soviet Ministry of Foreign Affairs. He is buried at the Vostryakovskoye Cemetery in Moscow.
