= 1952 in North Korea =

- Centuries: 20th; 21st
- Decades: 1940s; 1950s; 1960s; 1970s
- See also: Other events in 1952; Years in North Korea; Timeline of Korean history 1952 in South Korea

Events from the year 1952 in North Korea. The Korean War continued this year; United States President Dwight Eisenhower vowed in his first campaign to seek a peaceful resolution.

== Incumbents ==
- Premier: Kim Il Sung
- Supreme Leader: Kim Il Sung

== Events ==
- Battle of Triangle Hill

== See also ==
- Years in Japan
- Years in South Korea
