= 1949 in South Korea =

- Centuries: 20th; 21st
- Decades: 1940s; 1950s; 1960s
- See also: Other events in 1949; Years in South Korea; Timeline of Korean history 1949 in North Korea

Events from the year 1949 in South Korea.

== Incumbents ==
- President: Rhee Syng-man
- Vice President: Yi Si-yeong
- Prime Minister: Yi Pom-sok

== Events ==
May 23-Committee for the Five Northern Korean Provinces was established.

== Births ==
- 12 February - Hyun Jae-hyun, chairman
- 2 September - Bak Il, actor and voice actor (d. 2019)

== See also ==
- List of South Korean films of 1949
