= Seok Cheoljoo =

- Hangul: 석철주
- Hanja: 石鐵周
- RR: Seok Cheolju
- MR: Sŏk Ch'ŏlchu

Seok Cheoljoo or Suk Chul-Joo (born August 21, 1950) is a South Korean painter and professor. He studied oriental painting in Chugye University for the Arts and art education in the graduate school of Dongguk University. He is now a professor in Chugye University for the Arts.

He started to learn how to draw from well-known artist Lee Sang-beom when he was 16 years old, but did not enter university at the age of 27. Since he started upper education quite late, he started to learn how to describe and draw different kinds of paintings such as figures and still-life objects. His nickname is "the artist of jar" since his works largely used jars in his drawings.

According to the National Arts Institute of Korea, he is said to combine oriental drawings with modern materials such as acrylic paints. Recently, he expanded his reputation by re-interpreting 15c drawing of Ahn Gyeon.
