= 1950 in North Korea =

- Centuries: 20th; 21st
- Decades: 1940s; 1950s; 1960s; 1970s
- See also: Other events in 1950; Years in North Korea; Timeline of Korean history 1950 in South Korea

The following lists events that happened during 1950 in the Democratic People's Republic of Korea.

== Incumbents ==
- Premier: Kim Il Sung
- Supreme Leader: Kim Il Sung

== Events ==
=== June ===
- June 8 - Newspapers in Pyongyang published the manifesto of the "Central Committee of the United Democratic Patriotic Front", adopted the day before, announcing the goal of reunification of North Korea and South Korea starting with meetings on August 15. Seventeen days later, North Korean troops would invade South Korea.
- June 13 - The three North Korean "peace representatives", who had crossed into South Korea on Saturday, were arrested.
- June 25 - The Beginning of the Korean War
  - At 4am KST (June 24 – 7pm UTC), South Korean army bases near the border with North Korea, at Yeoncheon, came under fire without warning. After 45 minutes of shelling, North Korean troops invaded with six infantry divisions, an armored brigade and three border brigades coming across the 38th parallel. With many of their personnel on weekend leave, the four South Korean divisions in the area were quickly overwhelmed, and the invaders proceeded toward the South Korean capital of Seoul, 40 miles to the south.
  - In response to the North Korean invasion, United Nations Security Council Resolution 82 was voted upon, calling for "an immediate cessation of hostilities" and for "North Korea to withdraw forthwith their armed forces to the 38th parallel". The vote was 9-0, with the USSR absent and Yugoslavia abstaining.
- June 26 - Brigadier General Yi Hyong Gun, commander of the Second Division of the South Korean Army, decided against making a counter-attack against invading North Korean troops after determining "that the situation was out of control" and ordered a retreat toward Seoul. "His action," it would be noted later, "meant that there were no means to block the advancing North Korean People's Army", but General Yi would receive a promotion afterward.
- June 27 - Korean War
  - By 7:30 pm, the 9th Regiment of the North Korean Army's Third Division had reached the suburbs of Seoul, the South Korean capital; by 9:30 pm, sixty-seven hours after the attack had started, North Korean tanks had arrived at the gardens of the Changdeokgung Palace.
- *U.S. President Harry S. Truman ordered warships of the United States Seventh Fleet to assist South Korean forces in their resistance of the North Korean invasion.
  - With North Korea refusing to withdraw its forces from South Korea, United Nations Security Council Resolution 83 was voted upon, as a recommendation that "the Members of the United Nations furnish such assistance to the Republic of Korea as may be necessary to repel the armed attack". The vote was 7-1, with Yugoslavia opposing, Egypt and India abstaining, and the USSR — a permanent member which could have vetoed the resolution —absent because it had walked out of the UN on January 10.
- June 28 - As invading North Korean troops advanced toward bridges over the Han River, engineers of the Republic of Korea (ROK) Army of South Korea had rigged explosives. In the meantime, South Korean civilians and soldiers were fleeing across to avoid being trapped behind enemy lines. Detonation of the bombs at the main bridge, at Hangang, had been set for 1:30 a.m. General Kim Pak Il, the ROK Deputy Chief of Staff, delayed the blast for 45 minutes, but at 2:15 a.m., the blast order was given, destroying two spans of the Hangang Bridge and dropping thousands of persons in a 75-foot plunge to the river, killing at least 500 people; a railroad bridge across the river remained standing, however. The ROK Chief Engineer, Choi Chang-sik, would be blamed for the mistake and executed. North Korean forces captured Seoul at noon, three days and eight hours after the invasion began.
- June 30 - U.S. warplanes began bombing installations in North Korea and Communist-held South Korean territory, with 27 attacks on the North Korean capital of Pyongyang.
