= List of South Korean films of 1948 =

This is a list of films produced in South Korea in 1948. For films released prior to August 1948, see List of Korean films.

Released	English title	Korean title	Director	Cast	Genre	Notes
1948
11 February	The Night before Independence Day	독립전야	Choi In-gyu	Kim Shin-jae	Drama, Crime, Noir	
9 August	Su-u	수우	Ahn Jong-hwa		Drama	
20 August	Dance of Jang Chu-Hwa	장추화 무용	Choi In-kyu		Dacumentary	
25 September	The Class of Love	사랑의 교실	Kim Seong-min		Drama	
9 October	The Dawn	여명	An Jin-sang		Action, Crime	
15 November	The Town of Hope	희망의 마을	Choi In-kyu		Educational	
15 November	Yeosu-Suncheon Rebellion	여수순천 반란사건			Documentary	
21 November	A Sea Gull	갈매기	Lee Gyu-hwan		Drama	
28 November	Metropolis	대도시	Lee Jin		Melodrama	
	An Interrupted Route	끊어진 항로	Lee Man-heung		Drama	
	The Rose of Sharon	무궁화 동산	An Cheol-yeong		Documentary	
