= 1947 in South Korea =

- Centuries: 20th; 21st
- Decades: 1940s; 1950s; 1960s
- See also: Other events of 1947; Years in South Korea; Timeline of Korean history

Events from the year 1947 in South Korea.

== Incumbents ==
- Military governor:
  - Archer L. Lerch (until October 1947)
  - William F. Dean (from October 1947)

== Events ==
- January 1 – The Korean Sport & Olympic Committee is recognized by the International Olympic Committee.
- January 5 - Lakhui Chemical (락희화학), as predecessor of LG Chem was founded.
- April - Suh Yun-Bok (서윤복) Completes the Boston Marathon with a time of 2:25:39 becoming the first Asian person to win the event
- May 21 – The Second US-Soviet Joint Commission is held.
- May 25 – Hyundai Togun, the initial name of the Hyundai Group, is founded by Chung Ju-young.
- August 28 – The United States request the Korean issue to be handled by the United States, the Soviet Union, the United Kingdom, and the Republic of China in a four-country conference.
- September 17 – The United States submits the Korean problem to the United Nations (UN).
- November – The United Nations General Assembly recognizes Korea's claim to independence and makes preparations for the establishment of a government and the withdrawal of occupation forces.

== See also ==
- List of Korean films of 1919–1948
