= 1946 in South Korea =

- Centuries: 20th; 21st
- Decades: 1940s; 1950s; 1960s
- See also: Other events of 1946; Years in South Korea; Timeline of Korean history

Events from the year 1946 in South Korea.

== Incumbents ==
- Military governor:
  - Archer L. Lerch

=== People's Republic of Korea ===
- President: Syngman Rhee (until 1946)
- Chairman of the National People's Representative Conference: Lyuh Woon-hyung (until 1946)

== Events ==
=== September ===
Korean general strike of September 1946

=== October ===
1946 South Korean legislative election was held.

October 1-Autumn Uprising of 1946

=== November ===
Standing Committee of the Workers' Party of South Korea was elected in November.

== Births ==
- Song Dae-kwan

== See also ==
- List of Korean films of 1919–1948
