= 1951 in South Korea =

- Centuries: 20th; 21st
- Decades: 1940s; 1950s; 1960s; 1970s
- See also: Other events in 1951; Years in South Korea; Timeline of Korean history 1951 in North Korea

Events from the year 1951 in South Korea.

== Incumbents ==
- President: Rhee Syng-man
- Vice President: Yi Si-yeong (until 9 May), Kim Seong-su (starting 17 May)
- Prime Minister: Chang Myon

== Events ==
- Korean War
- January 4th:January–Fourth Retreat
- February 9th:Geochang massacre

== Births ==
- Bae Yong-kyun, film director
- Chung Mong-joon, Korean businessman and politician
- Kim Ja-ok, Korean actress (d. 2014)

== Deaths ==
- Soh Jaipil, Korean-American political activist and physician who was a noted champion of the Korean independence movement (b.1864)
- Kim Dong-in, Korean novelist (b. 1900)

== See also ==
- List of South Korean films of 1951
- Years in Japan
- Years in North Korea
