= Sociology of morality =

Sociology of morality is the branch of sociology that deals with the sociological investigation of the nature, causes, and consequences of people's ideas about morality. Sociologists of morality ask questions on why particular groups of people have the moral views that they do, and what are the effects of these views on behavior, interaction, structure, change, and institutions.
