= List of South Korean films of 1950 =

This is a list of films produced in South Korea in 1950.

Released	English title	Korean title	Director	Cast	Genre	Notes
1950
23 January	A Sad Story of Woman	여인애사	Shin Kyeong-gyun		Melodrama	
8 May	Heungbu and Nolbu	놀부와 흥부	Lee Gyeong-seon		Historical Drama	
?	Returning to Hometown	귀향	Lee Gyu-dong		Melodrama	
