= Andrei Podyolyshev =

- Андрей Подъёлышев
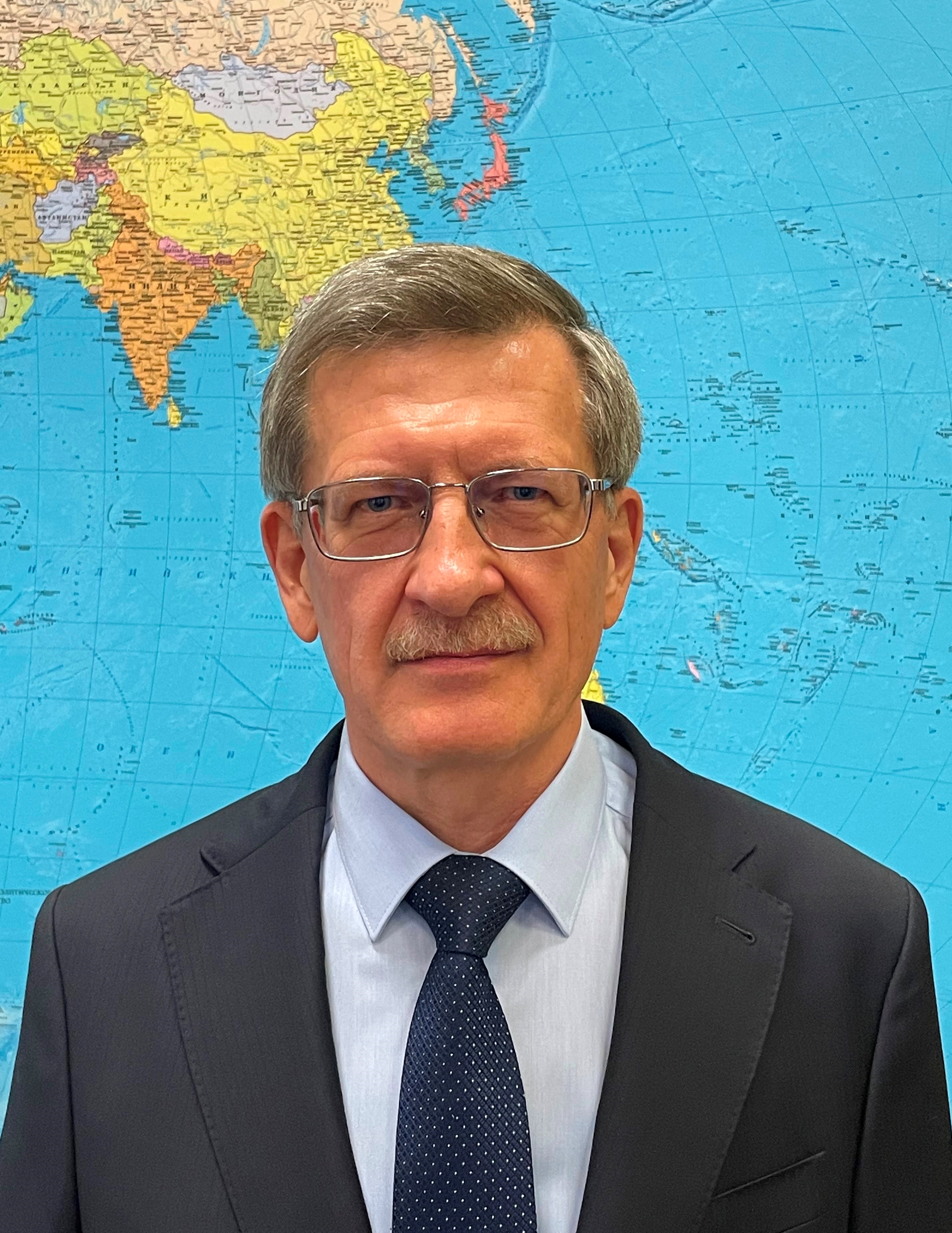

Russian Ambassador to North Korea
- Incumbent
- Assumed office 28 July 2026
- President: Vladimir Putin
- Preceded by: Aleksandr Matsegora

Personal details
- Born: 1 July 1962
- Education: MGIMO
- Occupation: Diplomat
- Awards: Medal of the Order "For Merit to the Fatherland"

Andrei Leonidovich Podyolyshev (Russian: Андрей Леонидович Подъёлышев; born July 1, 1962) is a Soviet and Russian diplomat, Ambassador Extraordinary and Plenipotentiary (2025). Since July 2026 he serves as the Russian Ambassador to North Korea.

== Biography ==
He graduated from the Moscow State Institute of International Relations under the Soviet Ministry of Foreign Affairs in 1984, after which he entered diplomatic service.

From 1984 to 1988, he worked at the Soviet Embassy in the DPRK.

From 1991 to 1996, he worked at the Russian Embassy in the Republic of Korea.

From 2001 to 2004, he was Consul-Counselor at the Consulate General of Russia in San Francisco (USA).

From 2005 to 2015, he was Deputy Director of the Consular Department of the Russian Ministry of Foreign Affairs.

From 2015 to 2019, he was Consul General of Russia in Istanbul, Turkey.

From 2019 to 2024, he was Deputy Director of the Consular Department of the Russian Ministry of Foreign Affairs.

From December 27, 2024 to July 28, 2026, he served as Ambassador Extraordinary and Plenipotentiary of the Russian Federation to Nigeria.

From July 28, 2026, he served as Ambassador Extraordinary and Plenipotentiary of the Russian Federation to the Democratic People's Republic of Korea.

== Awards ==
- Medal of the Order "For Merit to the Fatherland", 2nd class (August 25, 2008) - for a major contribution to the perpetuation of the memory of those who died defending the Fatherland and active work to preserve monuments, memorials and military graves.
