= Nikolai Georgiyevich Lebedev =

Soviet Major general

- Николай Георгиевич Лебедев
- Born: 3 December 1901; Buda village, Zhizdrinsky Uyezd, Kaluga Governorate, Russian Empire
- Died: 10 May 1992 (aged 90); Moscow, Russia
- Military career
- Allegiance: Soviet Union
- Branch: Soviet Army
- Service years: 1920–1966
- Rank: Major General
- Conflicts: World War II; Invasion of Poland; Winter War; Eastern Front; Soviet–Japanese War
- Awards: See below

Nikolai Georgiyevich Lebedev (Russian: Никола́й Гео́ргиевич Ле́бедев; 3 December 1901 – 10 May 1992) was a Red Army major general. Lebedev served in both the Eastern Front and Soviet-Japanese War. He later served as head of the Soviet Civil Administration in Korea (present-day North Korea) from 1947 to 1948. He is considered as one of the founders of North Korea and the ruling Workers' Party of Korea.

== Early life ==
Lebedev was born in 1901 in the Buda village in the Zhizdrinsky Uyezd of Kaluga Governorate (now Duminichsky District, Kaluga Oblast) to a peasant family. Until 1916, he studied at a zemstvo school and later attended a teacher's seminary in Kozelsk until 1918. In 1920, he joined the Communist Party of Soviet Union and began serving in the Red Army.

== Military career ==
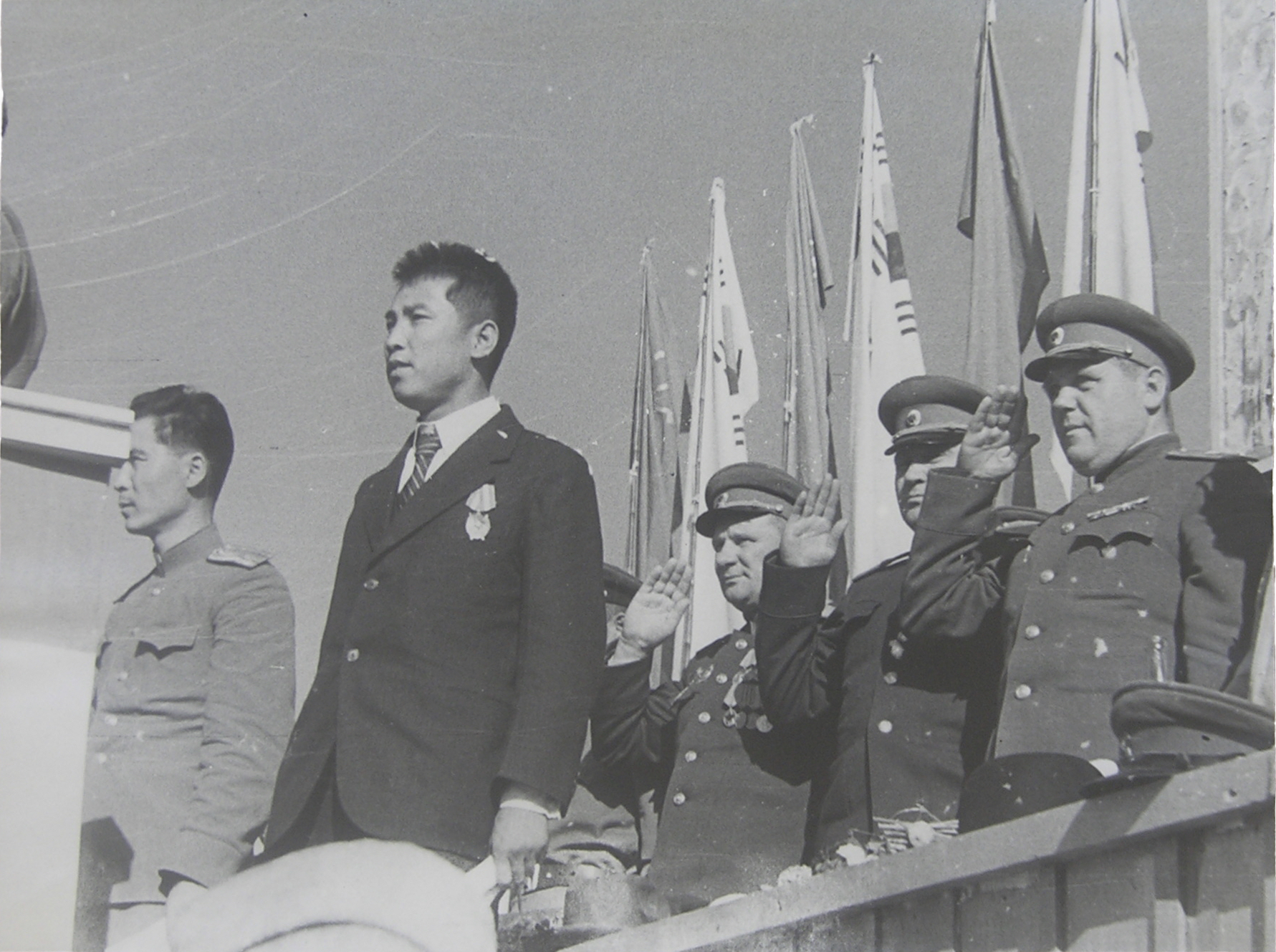
Kim Il-sung (front, right) during his first appearance in front of the public on 14 October 1945 at the Pyongyang City People's Congress. Major General Lebedev is at the far right, behind

In 1924, he graduated from the Higher Military Pedagogical School and in the same year, he was appointed as a teacher of social studies at the Tver Cavalry School of the Comintern named after Leon Trotsky. In December 1927, he completed his post-graduate courses in social studies. Lebedev was appointed as an assistant to the head of the educational unit for party political work at the school of anti-aircraft artillery. In March 1934, he was appointed as the political commissar to the commander of the 45th Artillery Regiment. In November 1936, Lebedev was appointed as the head of the propaganda, agitation and press department of the political department of the Kiev Military District. From 1939, he served as the head of the Military-Political School at the Kiev Military District.

In August 1939, Lebedev was appointed head of the political department of the 49th Rifle Corps. As part of this unit, he participated in the Soviet invasion of Poland and the Winter War. For this, he received the Order of Lenin. In 1940, Lebedev was promoted to brigade commissar.

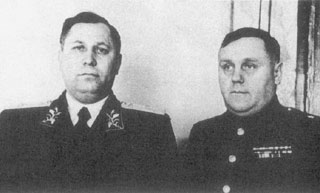
Administrators of Soviet Civil Administration in Korea; Terenty Shtykov (left) and Lebedev

On 15 June 1941, he was appointed a member of the Military Council of the 25th Army. Following the outbreak of Operation Barbarossa in 1941, Lebedev was promoted to major general in 1942. In 1944, he was awarded the Order of the Red Star for good combat and political training of military units transferred from the 25th Army to the Western Front. In August 1945, Lebedev was one of the commanders of military operations of the 25th Army of the Far Eastern Front during the Soviet-Japanese War, which led to the liberation of the Korean Peninsula from Japanese rule.

Following the liberation of Korean Peninsula and the subsequent Soviet occupation of the northern part of Korean Peninsula, Lebedev was appointed as the head of the Soviet Civil Administration. He was in charge of carrying out the instructions from the top officials, such as Terenty Shtykov in Pyongyang.

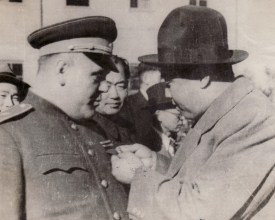
Kim Il-sung decorating Lebedev before his return at the end of 1948 following the establishment of the North Korean government

During his time as the head of Soviet civil administration in Korea, Lebedev directed several political initiatives to make Kim Il Sung, who was an unknown person at home, the leader of North Korea. Il-Sung Park, who taught Marxist-Leninist ideology to Kim at that time, testified that Lebedev was the first person to initiate the idolization and cult of personality of Kim Il Sung.

For his efforts, Lebedev is considered as one of the founders of the Workers' Party of Korea. On 10 September 1948, he returned to the Soviet Union after the official establishment of the North Korean government. Kim invited him to North Korea every year since then.

Following his return to Soviet Union, Lebedev served as the deputy commander for political affairs of the Don Military District from August 1949 to July 1950. He served in numerous positions and assignments until his retirement from the military in 1966.

== Later life ==
After his retirement, he lived a relatively long life. In 1988, he was involved and appeared in the Korean War documentary Korea: The Unknown War by Thames Television. Lebedev was interviewed by the South Korean newspaper JoongAng Ilbo, who visited his home in Moscow in 1991.

Andrei Lankov, a Russian scholar and specialist in Korean studies, writes in his book The DPRK Yesterday and Today: An Unofficial History of North Korea about his meeting with Lebedev:

"I had a chance to meet with N. G. Lebedev in 1989 and 1990. During these conversations, I was amazed that, despite extreme old age, N. G. Lebedev retained a brilliant memory and a sharp, somewhat ironic mind, which contrasted sharply with his extreme physical decrepitude".

Lebedev died in Moscow on 10 May 1992. He is buried at the Troyekurovskoye Cemetery. The memoirs he left are an important historical data related to the Soviet Civil Administration in Korea and the operation of the United States Army Military Government in Korea. There are many testimonies left in response to interviews by various people after the collapse of the Soviet Union.

== Honours and awards ==
USSR

Order of Lenin (three times)
Order of the Red Banner (three times)
Order of the Patriotic War, 1st class
Order of the Red Star
Medal "For the Victory over Germany in the Great Patriotic War 1941–1945"
Medal "For the Victory over Japan"
Medal "Veteran of the Armed Forces of the USSR"
Jubilee Medal "XX Years of the Workers' and Peasants' Red Army"
Jubilee Medal "30 Years of the Soviet Army and Navy"
Jubilee Medal "40 Years of the Armed Forces of the USSR"
Jubilee Medal "50 Years of the Armed Forces of the USSR"
Jubilee Medal "60 Years of the Armed Forces of the USSR"
Jubilee Medal "70 Years of the Armed Forces of the USSR"
Jubilee Medal "In Commemoration of the 100th Anniversary of the Birth of Vladimir Ilyich Lenin"
Jubilee Medal "Twenty Years of Victory in the Great Patriotic War 1941–1945"
Jubilee Medal "Thirty Years of Victory in the Great Patriotic War 1941–1945"
Jubilee Medal "Forty Years of Victory in the Great Patriotic War 1941–1945"

Foreign

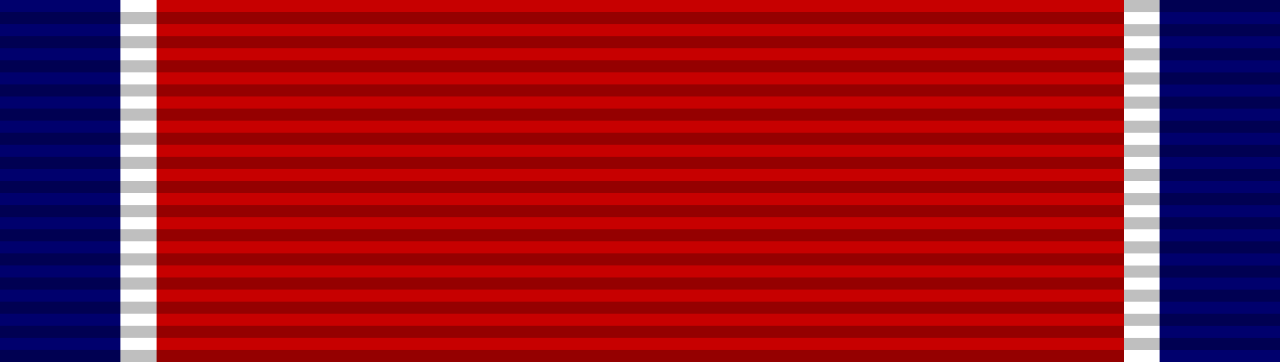
Patriotic Order of Merit in gold (East Germany)
Distinguished Service Medal of the National People's Army, Gold (East Germany)
Order of the National Flag, 1st class (North Korea)
Order of the National Flag, 2nd class (North Korea)
Medal for the Liberation of Korea (North Korea)
