= Medal for the Liberation of Korea =

North Korean award

- Awarded for: Soviet military personnel who have contributed to the liberation of Korea from Japanese occupation
- Presented by: North Korea
- Eligibility: Awarded to soldiers of the Red Army who participated in the war against Japan and its satellites, during the Soviet–Japanese War
- Status: No longer awarded
- Established: 1948

Highlights
- Total: 10,000
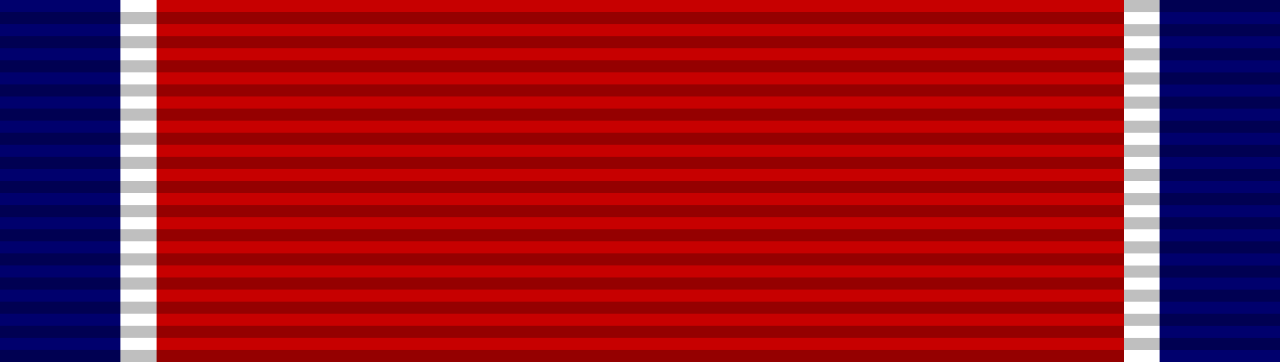
- Ribbon bar of the Medal for the Liberation of Korea

The Medal for the Liberation of Korea (Korean: 조선 1945.8.15) (Russian: Медаль «За освобождение Кореи»), a.k.a. Korea 15.8.1945, was a medal awarded by the Democratic People's Republic of Korea.

== History ==
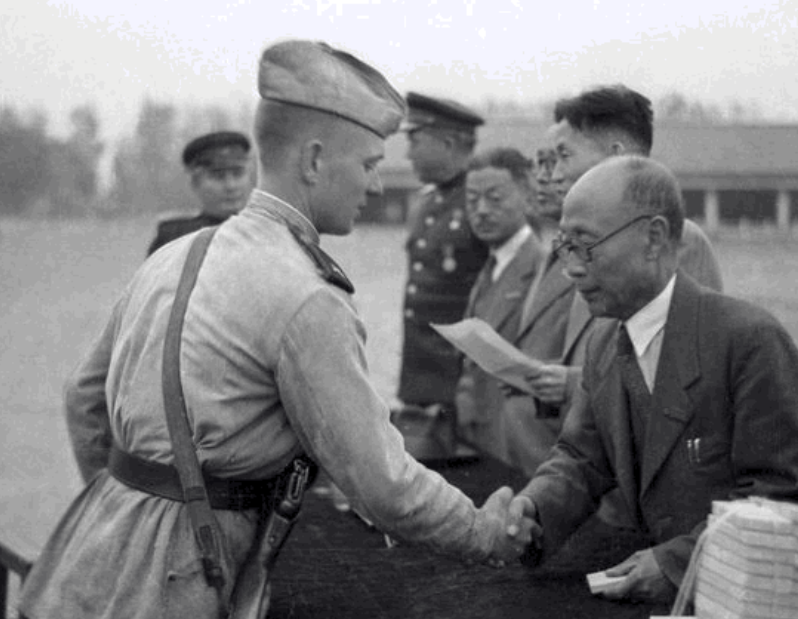
Chairman of the Standing Committee of the Supreme People's Assembly of the DPRK Kim Tu-bong decorates Soviet soldiers with the Medal for the Liberation of Korea in 1948.

The medal was established on October 15, 1948, by the Decree of the Presidium of the Supreme People's Assembly. It was awarded to the Red Army servicemen who participated in the Soviet-Japanese War, which led to the liberation of the Korean Peninsula from Japanese rule. In North Korea, the medal is known as Chosŏn 1945.8.15 (Korean: 조선 1945.8.15), which is the date of National Liberation Day of Korea.

== Appearance ==
The medal is made of silver and has a diameter of 33 mm. On the obverse, in the middle, against the background of the sun's rays, is the image of the Liberation Monument in Pyongyang, which is surrounded by a wreath of laurel branches. At the intersection, there is a ribbon with the inscription 'Liberation' (Korean: 해방).

The reverse side is smooth, in the middle there is an inscription in two lines "Korea / 1945.8.15." (Korean: 조선 1945.8.15). The ribbon is red, with wide blue stripes along both edges, separated from the middle by narrow white stripes. The tape is glued to a pentagonal metal shoe with a horizontal pin on the back for attaching to clothing.

== Notable recipients ==
- Marshal Rodion Malinovsky
- Marshal Kirill Meretskov
- Marshal Aleksandr Vasilevsky
- Admiral of the Fleet Nikolai Kuznetsov
- Captain 2nd Rank Viktor Leonov

== See also ==
- Flag of North Korea
- Orders and medals of North Korea
