= 1945 in South Korea =

- Centuries: 20th; 21st
- Decades: 1940s; 1950s; 1960s
- See also: Other events of 1945; Years in South Korea; Timeline of Korean history

Events from the year 1945 in Southern Korea.

== Incumbents ==
=== Empire of Japan ===
- Emperor:
  - Hirohito (until 12 September)
- Prime minister:
  - Kantarō Suzuki (until 17 August)
  - Naruhiko Higashikuni (from 17 August to 12 September)
- Governor-general:
  - Nobuyuki Abe (until 12 September)

=== United States Army Military Government in Korea ===
- Military governor:
  - Archer L. Lerch (from December 1945)

=== People's Republic of Korea ===
- President: Syngman Rhee (from 1945)

== Events ==
=== August ===
- August 15
  - Transfer of power happens in 9:00 a.m. from the Japanese to Lyuh Woon-hyung, head of the People's Republic of Korea, in Seoul. This decision was rescinded after the Soviets do not go further down all the way to Seoul. Japan takes back control in August 20th.
  - Emperor Hirohito announces Japan's surrender to the Allies.
- August 16 - Committee for the Preparation of Korean Independence (CPKI) is founded by Lyuh Woon-hyung.

=== September ===
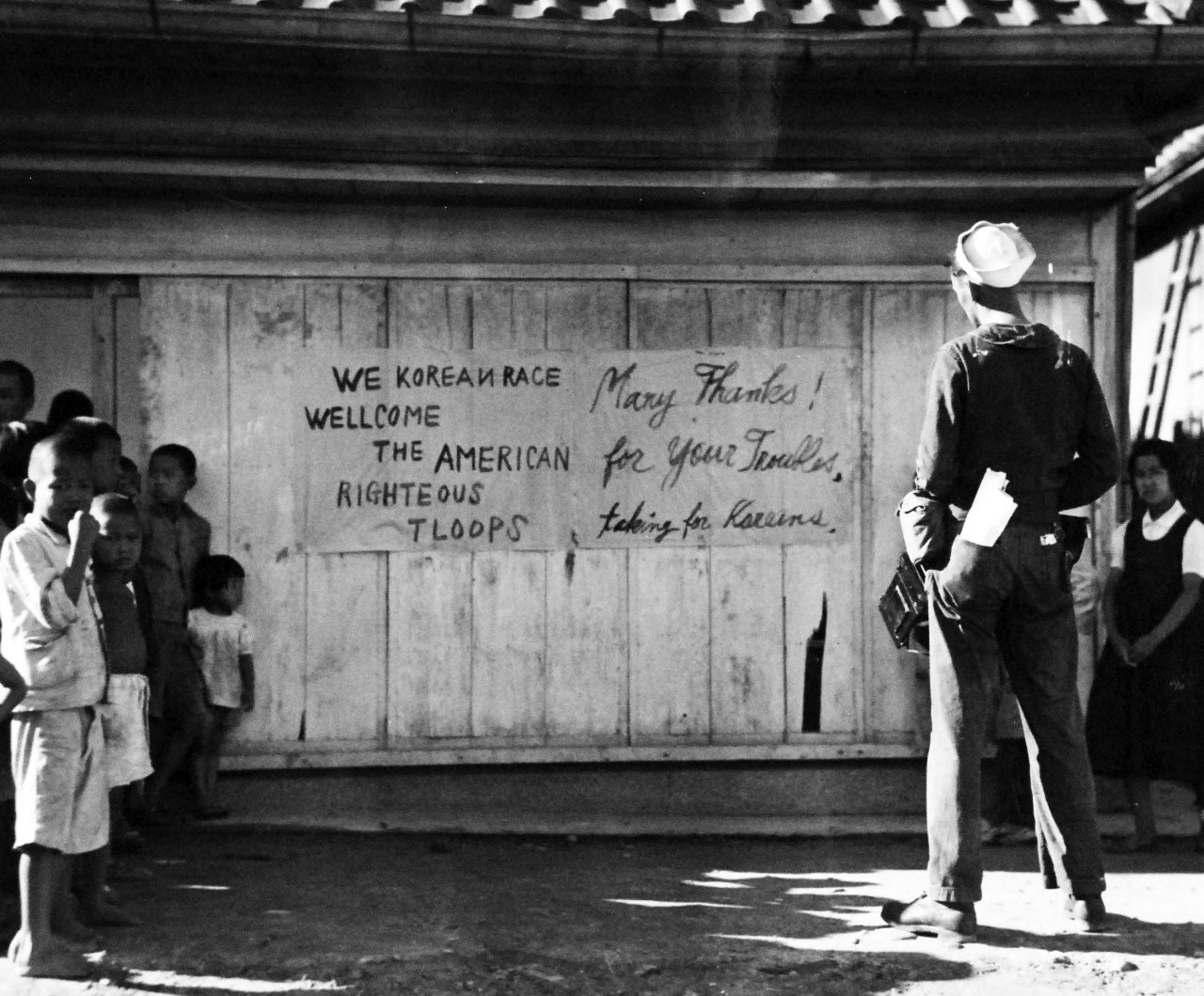
A U.S. Navy sailor reads a sign bearing greetings from "the Korean race" while arriving in Jinsen (present-day Incheon) on September 8, 1945.

- September 7 - The United States announces the establishment of the United States Army Military Government in Korea.
- September 8 - The U.S. military, led by commanding general John R. Hodge, arrives in Jinsen (present-day Incheon).
- September 9
  - U.S. forces take control of Seoul. The Japanese officially surrender control of Southern Korea over to U.S. forces, effectively ending Japan's 35-year rule of Korea.
  - The Chōsen Broadcasting Corporation is renamed as the Korean Broadcasting System.
- September 11 - The Kyongui line officially ceases operation due to the division of korea.
- September 12 - The Japanese office of governor-general of Korea is disbanded by the United States Army Military Government, formally ending Japan's 35-year rule over Korea.
- September 16 - The Korea Democratic Party is founded.
- September 20 - English becomes the official language of the United States Army Military Government in Korea.

=== October ===
- October 16 - Syngman Rhee returns to Korea.

=== December ===
- December 27 - A misreport regarding the results of the Moscow conference of 1945 happens causing mass confusion among the issue of trusteeship.

== See also ==
- List of Korean films of 1919–1948
