= Diplomatic Academy of the Ministry of Foreign Affairs of the Russian Federation =

Diplomatic training institute in Moscow, Russia

Coordinates: 55.7356°N 37.5955°E

- Дипломатическая академия Министерства иностранных дел Российской Федерации
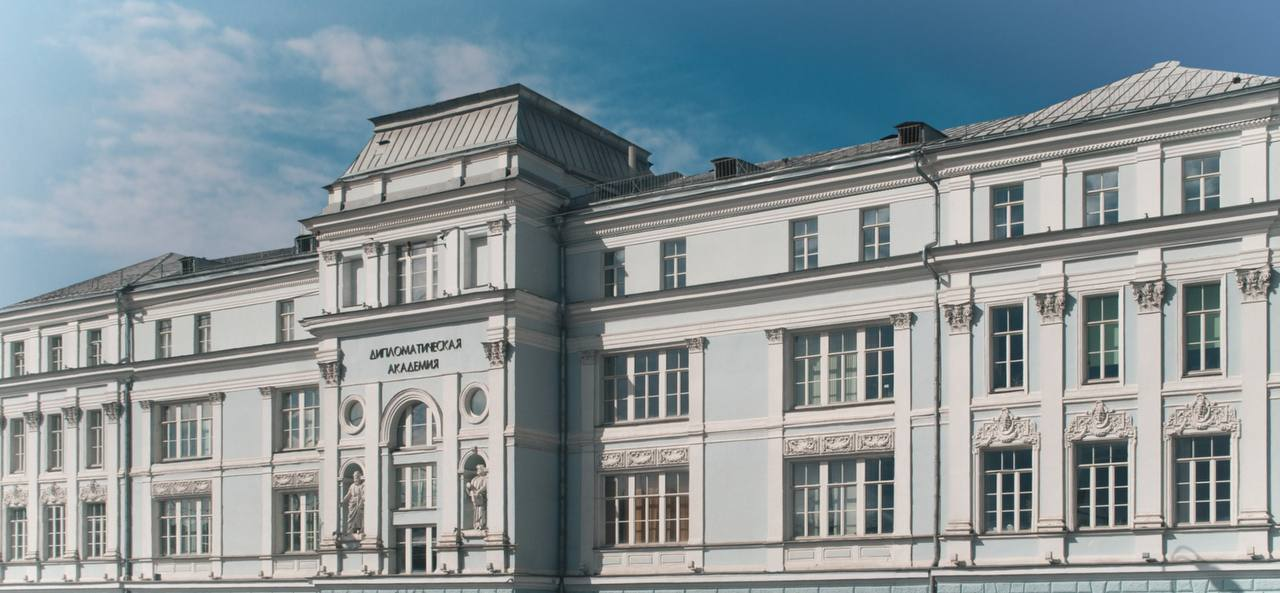
- Type: Public
- Established: 1934
- Rector: Sergey Vladimirovich Shitkov
- Location: Moscow, Russia
- Campus: Urban
- Colors: blue & white
- Website: www.dipacademy.ru
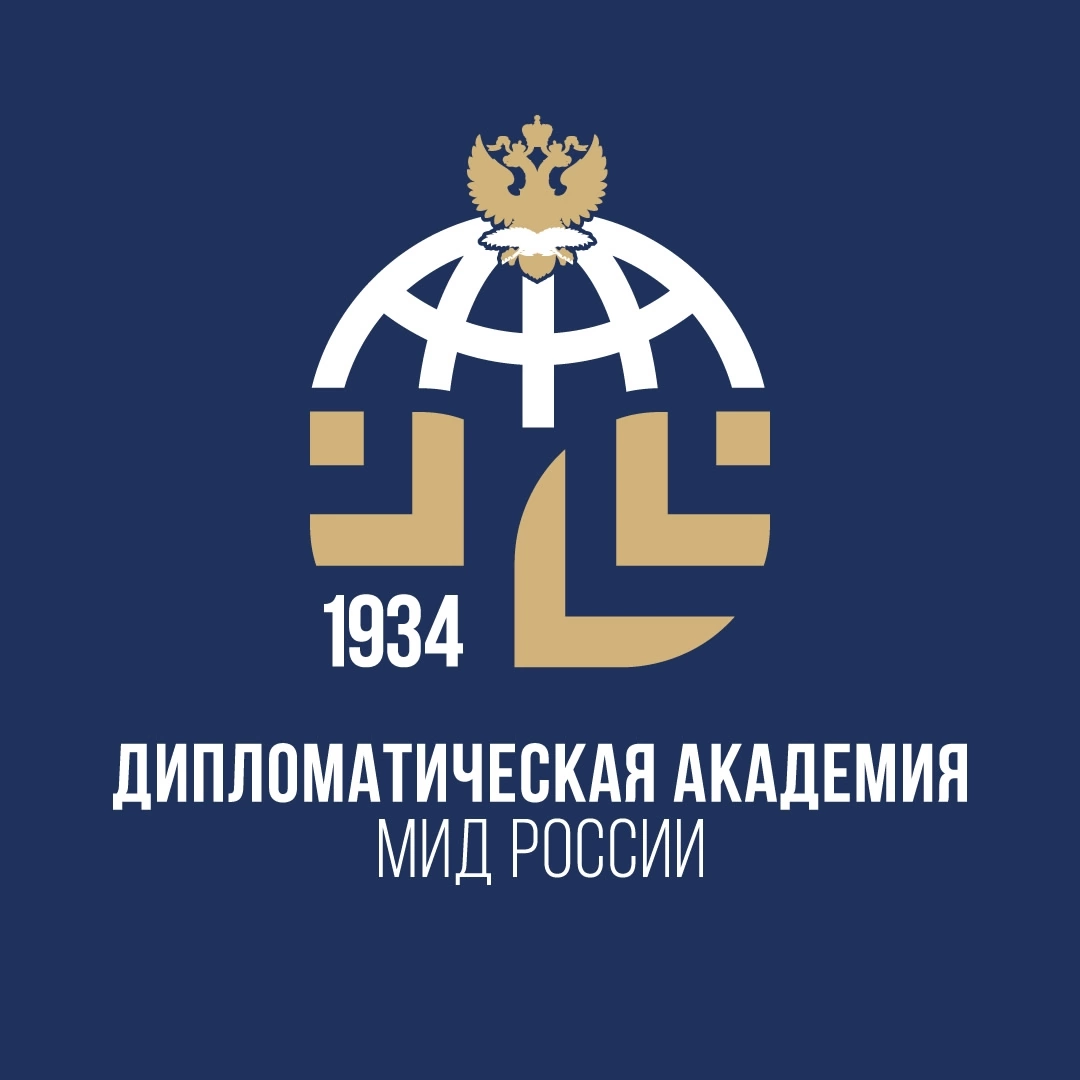

The Diplomatic Academy of the Ministry of Foreign Affairs of the Russian Federation is among the oldest diplomatic institutes in the world, that provides education in the field of international relations, international economic relations and international law.

== History ==
The Diplomatic Academy was established in 1934. The Institute began to work in the building of the former rental house of the First Russian Insurance Society, which the PCFA (since 1946 - MFA) used since 1918 to 1952. In 1974, with the USSR Council of Ministers transformed the Higher Diplomatic School into the Diplomatic Academy of the USSR Ministry of Foreign Affairs. Over the years the Academy has graduated over 7 thousand professional diplomats, among whom over 500 people have received the rank of Extraordinary and Plenipotentiary Ambassador.

The Diplomatic Academy will merge with MGIMO on 31 January 2026.

== Structure ==
The Diplomatic Academy of the Russian Foreign Ministry is one of the most famous and prestigious centres for studying international relations, economics, political science, jurisprudence and journalism. It educates diplomats for the departments of the Russian Foreign Ministry, MFA of the foreign countries.

Traditionally, the Diplomatic Academy is famous for its unique, highly effective method of intensive teaching of foreign languages. Today, the Academy teaches more than 23 foreign languages. The Academy includes the following academic units for students pursuing bachelor's and master's degrees:

- Faculty of International Relations;
- Faculty of Economics;
- Faculty of Law;
- Faculty of Journalism.

In addition to higher professional education programs, the Diplomatic Academy implements additional education programs based on the faculties of training highly qualified personnel and advanced training of diplomatic workers. The Institute of Current International Problems and the Center for Global Studies and International Relations provides scientific work. Three dissertation councils function (international law, political sciences and history).

== Partnership agreements ==
Long-standing cooperations exist with other institutions such as the Diplomatic Academy of Vienna and MGIMO.

== Editions ==
The Diplomatic Academy regularly publishes a collection of scientific articles, the Diplomatic Yearbook. From 2013 to 2019, the Diplomatic Academy Alumni Association published the Alma Mater journal. Since 2014, the journal Bulletin of the Diplomatic Academy of the Russian Foreign Ministry. Russia and the World has been published, which is included in the List of leading peer-reviewed scientific publications of the Higher Attestation Commission. Since 2015, the International Legal Courier journal has been published jointly with the publishing house of the ANO International Analytical and Publishing Center for Legal Information. Since 2017, the Council of Young Scientists of the Diplomatic Academy has been publishing the Bulletin of International Scientists journal. The Academy participates in publishing the journals "Diplomatic Service", "World and Politics", "Obozrevatel", which are included in the List of Recommended Publications of the Higher Attestation Commission. Since 2020, the Academy has been publishing the journal "Diplomatic Service and Practice" - a unique publication, the authors of which are active diplomats, statesmen, and international experts.

== Awards ==
- Order of the Red Banner of Labour (June 12, 1984)
- Presidential Certificate of Gratitude (January 24, 2024) - for service in education and science, training highly qualified specialists in the field of international relations, global economics and international law
- Certificate of Honor of the Secretary of the Security Council of the Russian Federation (March 14, 2024)

== See also ==
- Ministry of Foreign Affairs (Russia)
- Foreign relations of Russia
