= Terentii Shtykov =

Soviet politician (1907–1964)

- Терентий Штыков
- Shtykov in 1939

1st Ambassador of the Soviet Union to North Korea
- In office 10 October 1948 – 13 December 1950
- Premier: Joseph Stalin
- Preceded by: Position established
- Succeeded by: Vladimir Razuvayev

Ambassador of the Soviet Union to Hungary
- In office 29 May 1959 – 5 July 1960
- Premier: Nikita Khrushchev
- Preceded by: Yevgeni Gromov
- Succeeded by: Vladimir Ustinov

Personal details
- Born: 13 March [O.S. 28 February] 1907 Liubki, Vitebsk Governorate, Russian Empire (now Haradok District, Vitebsk Region, Belarus)
- Died: 25 October 1964 (aged 57) Leningrad, Russian SFSR, Soviet Union
- Party: Communist Party of the Soviet Union (1929–64)
- Awards: Order of Lenin

Military service
- Allegiance: Soviet Union
- Branch/service: Red Army
- Years of service: 1939−1959
- Rank: Major General (1942–43); Lieutenant General (1943–44); Colonel General (1944–51); Major General (1951–64)
- Commands: 7th Army (1939–40); Northwestern Front (1941–42); Leningrad Front (1942–43); Volkhov Front (1943–44); Karelian Front (1944); 1st Far Eastern Front (1945)

Terentii Fomich Shtykov (Russian: Тере́нтий Фоми́ч Шты́ков; 13 March [O.S. 28 February] 1907 – 25 October 1964) was a Soviet general who was the de facto head of the Soviet 1945–1948 military occupation of northern Korea and the first Soviet Ambassador to North Korea from 1948 to 1950. Shtykov's support for Kim Il Sung was crucial in his rise to power, and the two persuaded Stalin to allow the Korean War to begin in June 1950.

A protégé of the influential politician Andrei Zhdanov, General Shtykov served as a political commissar during World War II and ended up on the Military Council of the Primorskiy Military District. Through direct access to Joseph Stalin, Shtykov became the "real supreme ruler of North Korea, the principal supervisor of both the Soviet military and the local authorities." Shtykov conceived of the Soviet Civil Administration, supported Kim's appointment as head of the North Korean provisional government, and assisted Stalin with editing the first North Korean constitution.

As the preeminent representative of the Soviet Union's political authority over the nascent North Korea from October 1945 to December 1950, Shtykov's legacy was to aid the Kim family's rise to power. They started the war to free Kim from Soviet domination, but China intervened after North Korea's poor military performance in the early autumn. Shtykov was fired as ambassador in December and demoted to major general the following month. He later served as the Soviet ambassador to Hungary from 1959 to 1960.

Andrei Lankov asserts that Shtykov made more impact on Korean history than any foreigner other than Japanese colonial politicians, and that he was "the actual architect of the North Korean state as it emerged in 1945–50." Several of Shtykov's policies, most notably North Korean land reform, are today credited to Kim by the official North Korean media.

== Early life ==
Shtykov was born in 1907 to a family of farmers in eastern Belarus. In 1929, he joined the Soviet Communist Party in Leningrad and became a Komsomol activist. In 1938, Shtykov became the Second Secretary of the Leningrad Regional Committee, where he became the protege of First Secretary Andrei Zhdanov. Zhdanov's support allowed Shtykov to rise rapidly, and Shtykov even briefly held a leading role during the Great Purge that September.

== World War II ==
During World War II, Shtykov served as a political commissar in several fronts near Leningrad. By the end of the war he was one of only three Colonel general political commissars (the highest rank allowed for political commissars in the Red Army). As political commissar of the Far Eastern Front, Shtykov assisted Marshal Kirill Meretskov in accepting the surrender of Japan in northern Korea on August 19, 1945. After the war, he was made deputy commander of the Primorskiy Military District.

== Soviet Civil Administration in Korea ==
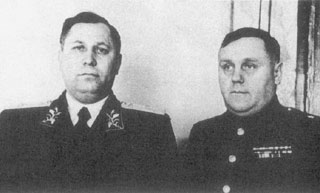
Administrators of Soviet Civil Administration in Korea; Shtykov (left) and Nikolai Lebedev

Following the division of Korea, Joseph Stalin sought to turn northern Korea into a socialist buffer state between the Soviet bloc and the American occupation in the southern half of the peninsula. Shtykov's influence rose in tandem with the rise of his mentor Andrei Zhdanov, who was thought to be Stalin's most likely successor after the war. As member of the Military Council for the Primorskiy District, Shtykov frequently visited Pyongyang and communicated to Zhdanov and Stalin about developments on the Korean Peninsula. Shtykov "exercised extremely close supervision over political events in North Korea" on Stalin's behalf. In January 1946, Shtykov replaced Ivan Chistyakov as the senior officer in charge of North Korea. As the most powerful man in the northern occupation zone of Korea, Shtykov personally selected the composition of the Soviet Civil Administration, and its second leader would comment that "there was not an event [in North Korea] in which Shtykov was not involved." Shtykov and his aides repeatedly urged the Soviet Union to send more aid to Korea. He became friends with Kim Il Sung, and Shtykov's strong support of Kim was decisive in his rise to power.

Shtykov also headed the Soviet delegation to the Joint Soviet-American Commission on Korea. The Americans thought Shtykov was a "hot-tempered authoritarian," and the two governments failed to negotiate a unified government for the Korean Peninsula. In March 1946, Shtykov outlined his vision for a unified Korean Peninsula, in which the head of state would be Lyuh Woon-hyung. A communist would be appointed as one of the two deputy prime ministers, as well as holding positions as ministers of internal affairs, of foreign affairs, of industry, of education and of propaganda, as well as chairman of the Committee for Economic Planning. Kim would be minister of internal affairs, while Pak Hon-yong would be a deputy prime minister. Shtykov shared his plans with Kim and Pak. Several amendments were made to the plan, including the creation of a ministry of the people's armed forces, to be given to Kim, while Choe Yong-gon would be minister of internal affairs. However, those proposals ultimately failed to make ground.

Shtykov continued to be the pre-eminent power in the North after Kim was made chairman of the Provisional People's Committee of North Korea. In December 1946, Shtykov and two other Soviet generals designed the election results of the Assembly for the Provisional Committee. Without any Korean input, the generals decided "the exact distribution of seats among the parties, the number of women members, and, more broadly, the precise social composition of the legislature." The original 1948 North Korean constitution was primarily authored by Stalin and Shtykov in Moscow. The constitution went into effect only after the two had a lengthy discussion on editing the draft though some articles were later rewritten by Soviet supervisors. On 10 July 1948, in response to elections in South Korea, the Soviet Politburo instructed Shtykov to implement the constitution, which was done by the People’s Assembly of North Korea, which led to the establishment of the Democratic People's Republic of Korea. On 27 August, Shtykov wrote a preliminary composition of the North Korean cabinet in his diary, as well as a final one on 30 August. Shtykov was later named the first Soviet Ambassador to the DPRK.

=== Land reform ===
General Shtykov was the main instigator of North Korea's March 1946 land reform program, though Kim Il Sung usually gets the credit for it in both North and South Korea. Originally, the Soviet blueprint for land reform had involved compensating the large landowners and selling the land to the farmers. Shtykov suggested that the land be confiscated from landowners and Japanese collaborators and distributed to poor and landless peasants without compensation. The nationwide land reform broke the feudal socioeconomic structure and proved highly popular with many North Korean peasants. Many rich landowners and collaborators fled to the South, which allowed the reform to happen with little bloodshed.

=== Korean War ===
While Stalin intended to use North Korea as a buffer state to the Western-friendly South Korea and Japan, Shtykov was sympathetic to North Korean attempts to liberate the South through socialism. Shtykov supported Kim Il Sung and Pak Hon-yong's 31 May 1949 proposal to create a Democratic Front for the Reunification of the Fatherland to advocate for peaceful unification of North and South, noting that Syngman Rhee's likely refusal would damage his legitimacy among the Korean population. Shtykov suspected that Rhee would attack the North by June 1950 and backed the DFUF "to slow down southern aggression, cultivate alliances with anti-Rhee forces in the South, and make the West appear opposed to North-South unification." After the victory of the Chinese Communist Party in the Chinese Civil War Kim persistently lobbied the Soviets to support a Northern-led violent unification of the peninsula.

Shtykov was sympathetic to Kim's proposal and helped him persuade a reluctant Stalin to accept Kim's cause. Kim and Shtykov assured Stalin that the war would be a short blitzkrieg "at almost no cost," and Shtykov predicted that it would not provoke a Western involvement. On 30 January 1950, Stalin telegraphed Shtykov to say that an invasion "would need extensive preparations" and that "it should be organised without taking too big a risk". On June 25, 1950, North Korea invaded the South. Seoul fell rapidly, and by late July, the DPRK controlled all of Korea except Busan and the surrounding area. However, after the UN intervention at the Battle of Inchon, the military situation reversed. North Korea was saved only by Chinese intervention, and Shtykov's diplomatic career ended. On 22 November 1950, Shtykov was dismissed from participating in all military affairs, which were now handled by Lieutenant General Vladimir Razuvayev. He was then recalled home and never returned to Korea.

== Later career and death ==
After being fired, Shtykov was demoted to major general on 3 February 1951 and was appointed deputy chairman of Kaluga Oblast. He later served as First Secretary of Novgorod and Primorskiy Oblast, before being named Ambassador to Hungary in 1959. Shtykov's hardline Stalinism clashed with János Kádár's Goulash Communism policies, and he was recalled in 1960. He served as Chairman of the State Control Commission for the Council of Ministers of the Russian Soviet Federative Socialist Republic before dying on vacation in 1964.

== Historic significance ==
Shtykov's decisions proved highly consequential for the Korean Peninsula and the world. Although Shtykov was the pre-eminent leader of North Korea from 1945 to 1950, he allowed Koreans to take the credit for his policies. Shtykov's support of Kim over other Korean communists such as Pak Hon-yong was a chief factor in the Kim family's rise to power. Additionally, Shtykov masterminded the 1946 land reform in North Korea, which was arguably the most popular policy conducted in either Korea. South Korea reversed the land reform during the brief United Nations occupation of the North, which provoked a backlash by local farmers. Most significant was Shtykov's decision to support Kim's effort to violently reunite the peninsula, which ended his career. Shtykov's sympathy to Kim's expansionist aims almost certainly made Stalin authorize the Korean War. The war did not end in the capitulation of the American-backed South but allowed Kim to secure effective North Korean independence from the Soviet Union. All of Shtykov's actions are today attributed to Kim by North Korean official media, and even South Korean media assumes that Kim was the driving force behind land reform.

== Awards and honors ==
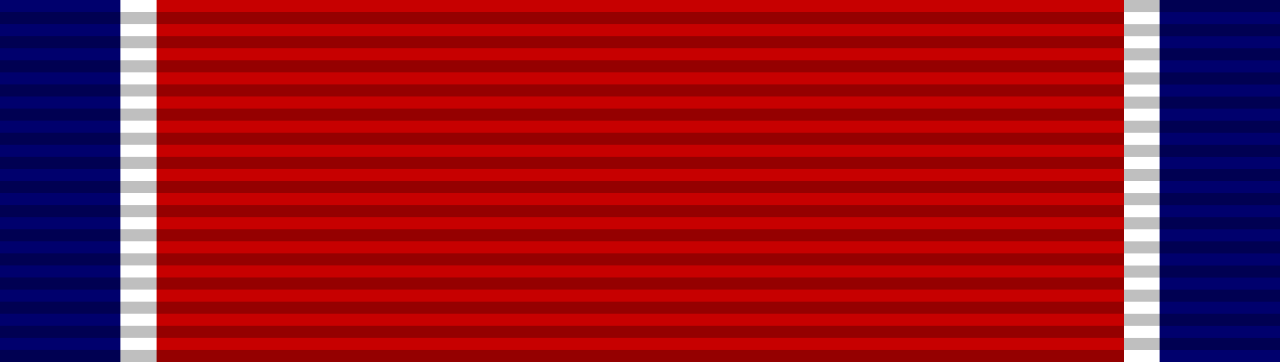
Three Orders of Lenin (4 April 1939, 12 March 1957, ?)
Order of the Red Banner (21 March 1940)
Order of Suvorov, 1st class (2 November 1944)
Order of Kutuzov, 1st class, thrice (21 March 1944, 29 July 1944, 8 September 1945)
Medal "For the Defence of Leningrad" (1942)
Medal "For the Defence of the Soviet Transarctic" (1944)
Medal "For the Victory over Germany in the Great Patriotic War 1941–1945" (1945)
Medal "For the Victory over Japan" (1945)
Jubilee Medal "30 Years of the Soviet Army and Navy" (1948)
Jubilee Medal "40 Years of the Armed Forces of the USSR" (1958)
Medal "In Commemoration of the 250th Anniversary of Leningrad" (1957)
Order of the National Flag, 3rd class (North Korea)
Medal for the Liberation of Korea (North Korea)

A village in Shkotovsky District of Primorsky Krai was named Shtykovo in honor of him. An embankment in Staraya Russa was also named after him. From 1967 to 1991, the Yakovlev Street in Veliky Novgorod was named in honor of Shytkov before its original name was returned.

Political offices
Preceded by office created	Ambassador of the Soviet Union to North Korea; 10 October 1948 – November 1950	Succeeded by Vladimir Razuvayev
Preceded by Yevgeni Gromov	Ambassador of the Soviet Union to Hungary; 29 May 1959 – 5 July 1960	Succeeded by Vladimir Ustinov
Preceded by ?	Deputy Chairman of the Executive Committee of the Kaluga Provincial Council; 1951–1954	Succeeded by ?
Preceded by ?	Chairman of the Commission on State Control, Russian SFSR; 1961–1963	Succeeded by ?
Preceded by ?	Deputy Chairman of the State Committee of Party Control, Bureau of Russian SFSR, Central Committee of the Communist Party; 1963–1964	Succeeded by ?
Military offices
Preceded by ?	Deputy Commander in Chief for Political Affairs, Primorskiy Military District; 1947–1948	Next: ?
Party political offices
Preceded by ?	Second Secretary of the Leningrad Regional Committee; 16 June 1938 – 17 January 1945	Succeeded by ?
Preceded by ?	First Secretary of Novgorod Regional Party Committee; 1954 – January 1956	Succeeded by ?
Preceded by ?	First Secretary of Primorskiy Regional Party Committee; 22 January 1956 – May 1959	Succeeded by ?
