= Soviet Civil Administration =

1945–1948 government in northern Korea

Soviet Civil Administration: 소비에트 민정청; Советская зона оккупации Кореи
- Communist government under a military occupation (1945–1946)
- : Top: Flag of the Soviet Union; Middle 1: Flag of North Korea; Middle 2: Emblem of North Korea; Bottom: Location of the Soviet Civil Administration in the Korean Peninsula
- Formation: 24 August 1945
- Extinction: 9 September 1948
- Occupied territory: North Korea
- Country: Soviet Union

Civilian government
- First: Provisional People's Committee (1946–1947)
- Second: People's Committee (1947–1948)
- Last: Democratic People's Republic of Korea (July–September 1948)

People's Assembly (1947–1948); Supreme People's Assembly (1948)
- Chair: Kim Il Sung
- Deputy Chair: Choe Yong-gon (1947–1948); Kim Tu-bong (1948)
- Meeting place: Pyongyang

Executive
- Head Administrator (de facto) (Note: Shtykov was the de facto leader of the Soviet Civil Administration in North Korea, overseeing the creation of the North Korean communist regime.): Terentii Shtykov (1945–1948)
- Head of the Civil Administration: Andrei Romanenko (1945–1947); Nikolai Lebedev (1947–1948)
- Chairman of the People's Committee (Note: Chairman of the Provisional People's Committee from 1946 to 1947.): Kim Il Sung (1946–1948)
- Headquarters: Pyongyang

The Soviet Civil Administration (Note: Korean: 소비에트 민정청; Russian: Советская зона оккупации Кореи, romanized: Sovetskaya zona okkupatsii Korei, lit. 'Soviet occupation zone in Korea') (SCA) was the official ruling authority of the northern half of Korea from 24 August 1945 to 9 September 1948, governing concurrently with the Provisional People's Committee for North Korea from 1946.

Even though formally referred as civilian administration, it was originally a military organization that included civilians of different professions. The SCA was the administrative structure that the Soviet Union used to govern what would become the Democratic People's Republic of Korea (North Korea) following the division of Korea. General Terentii Shtykov was the main proponent of setting up a centralized structure to coordinate Korean People's Committees.

After the banning of the People's Republic of Korea by the American occupational authorities in the south in late 1945, the Soviet authorities co-opted the PRK committees on 8 February 1946. This setup was officially recommended by General Ivan Chistyakov and headed by General Andrei Romanenko in 1945 and by General Nikolai Lebedev in 1946, to install Kim Il Sung as the leader of a pro-Soviet regime from Moscow, when he followed his rise to power that transitioned him from the Red Army officer to the absolute dictator of North Korea, who would rule until his death in 1994, he was posthumously declared the "Eternal President" on 5 September 1998.

== Postwar period ==
In the postwar period between 1946 and 1949 the Soviet Sakhalin administration, in anticipation of Japanese evacuation of Karafuto and the Kuril Islands, had allegedly established a relationship with the SCA in order to secure a cheap Korean workforce to be used on Sakhalin fisheries that were about to evacuate from the islands along with Japanese civilians. By 1950 the Korean workforce grew up to 10 thousand people on Sakhalin island alone.

During the Soviet occupation, Soviet soldiers committed rape against both Japanese and Korean women alike. Soviet soldiers also looted the property of both Japanese and Koreans living in northern Korea.

== Administration ==
Under the Soviet Civil Administration from 1945 to 1948, North Korea was governed by a group of influential Soviet generals who played key roles in shaping the country's political landscape. Colonel General Ivan Mikhailovich Chistyakov, commanding officer of the 25th Army, played a critical role in deciding the location of the 25th Army headquarters, choosing Pyongyang as the capital of North Korea, a decision that continues to have a lasting impact to this day. Alongside him, Major General Nikolai Georgiyevich Lebedev, the political officer of the 25th Army, trained Kim Il Sung and coined the official name of North Korea, the Democratic People's Republic of Korea, emphasizing the purported rule by the people.

However, the true architect of North Korea's early communist regime during this period was Colonel General Terentiy Fomich Shtykov, the political officer of the 1st Far Eastern Front. De facto leader of North Korea from 1945 to 1948, Shtykov shaped the nation's politics, economy, and education system. He edited the initial draft of North Korea's constitution, formed the first cabinet of ministers, and actively supported Kim Il Sung's invasion plans, which led to the outbreak of the Korean War. Despite being recalled to Moscow and demoted after the military disaster, Shtykov's impact on North Korea's governance was immense. His role in starting the Korean War and overseeing the Soviet influence in North Korean affairs remains a significant aspect of understanding the country's history during this critical period.

During the Soviet Civil Administration, Kim Il Sung, along with other North Korean politicians like Kim Tu Bong and Pak Hon Yong, followed the orders of Shtykov and the Soviet generals. The "Provisional People's Committee for North Korea," though officially presenting itself as the ruling government, had no autonomy and merely executed the decisions made by the Soviet Civil Administration. The generals, including Shtykov, played a decisive role in shaping North Korea's early communist regime, with their actions and decisions significantly influencing the nation's political landscape for years to come.

== Inter-Korean relations ==
At the time of division, the majority of Korean industry was concentrated in the North, while many of the agricultural land was in the South. Power lines and shipping connections were maintained during this period, but were frequently cut off by the Soviets and the supply of electricity or fertilizer to the south, and the U.S. State Department reported it frequently did so. The South, controlled by the United States maintained the power grids and energy.

== Dissolution ==
After the legislative elections held by the Soviet authorities in August 1948, the Democratic People's Republic of Korea was proclaimed on 10 July 1948 after the constitution was enacted; Kim Il Sung became its first premier on 9 September by the Soviet authorities. Soviet forces were withdrawn in December 1948.

== See also ==
- Korea under Japanese rule
- History of North Korea
- People's Republic of Korea
- Provisional People's Committee for North Korea
- United States Army Military Government in Korea
