= Elections in North Korea =

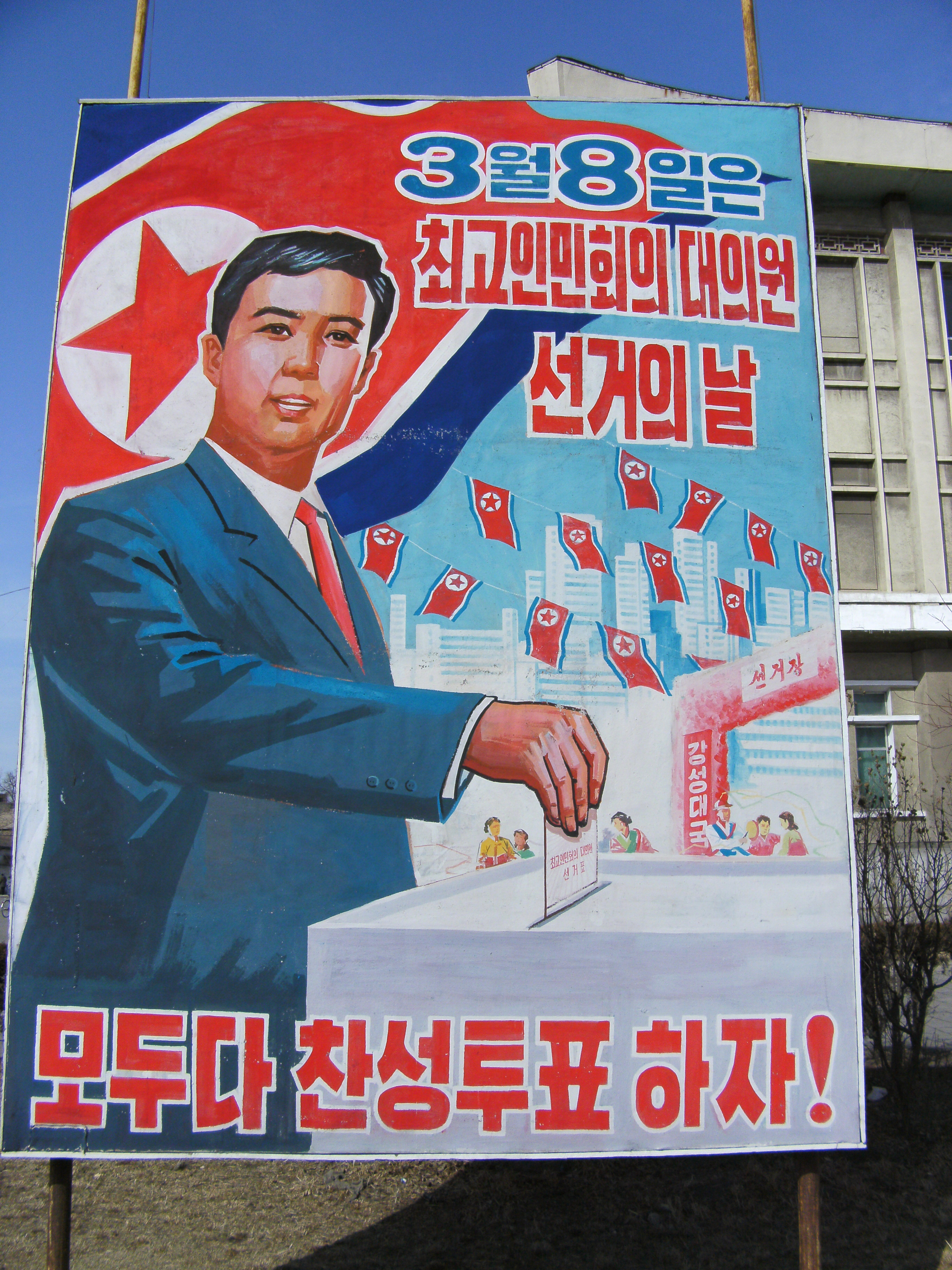
A propaganda poster in Pyongyang with the slogan "Let's all vote yes!" ("모두다 찬성투표 하자!")

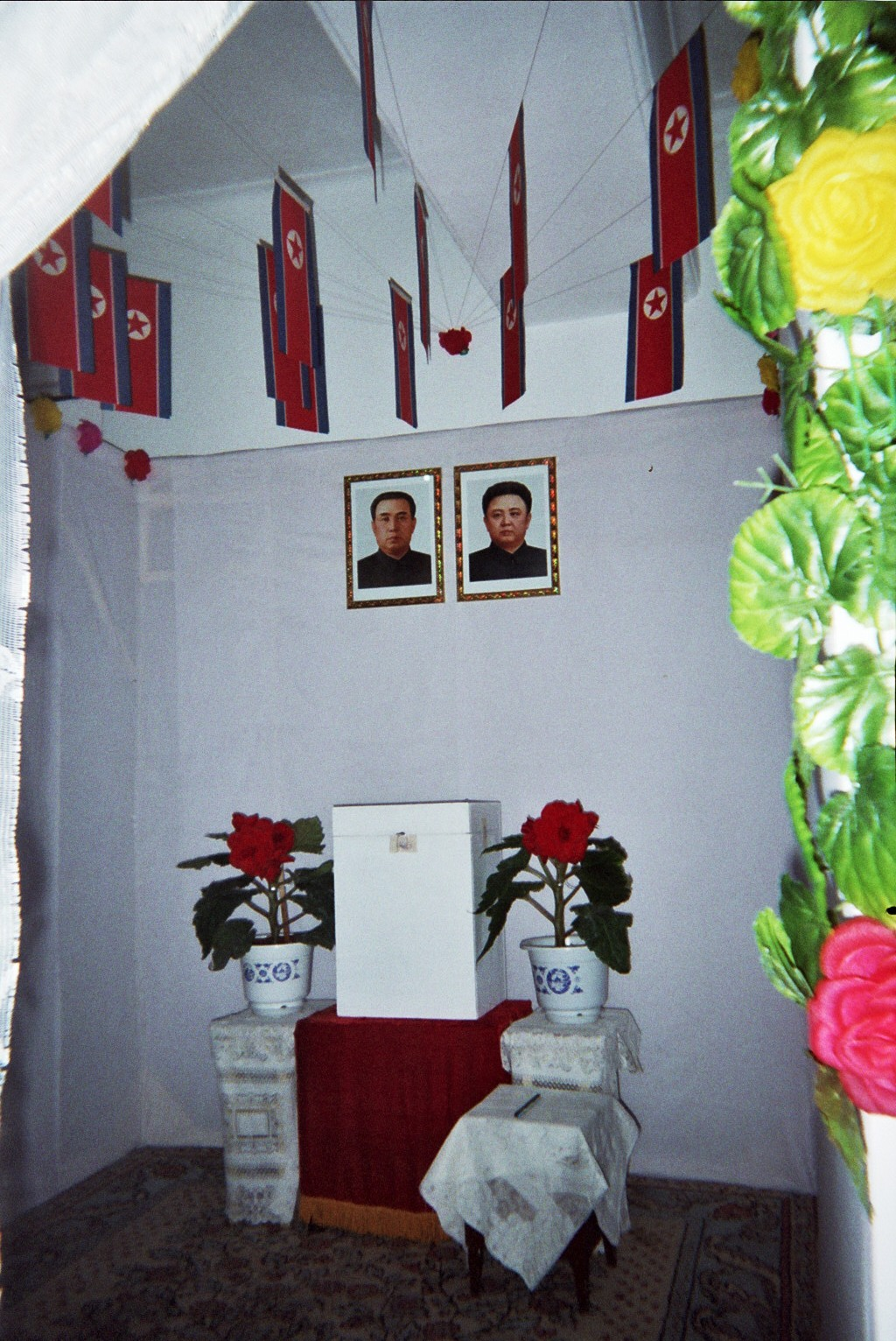
If the voter wishes to cross off the name of the candidate, it must be done with a red pen next to the ballot box.

Elections in North Korea are held every four-to-five years for the Supreme People's Assembly (SPA), the country's national legislature, and every four years for Local People's Assemblies. Each candidate is selected by the Workers' Party of Korea. Voters may either submit the ballot unaltered as a vote of approval, or cross out the name on the ballot to disapprove the candidate. The vast majority of candidates come from the Workers' Party of Korea.

Turnout is near 100% according to official statistics. The elections are also used as a census, and to determine approval of government policies. Critics argue that North Korean elections are show elections, lacking competition and allowing the government to claim a veneer of pseudo-democratic legitimacy.

== Procedure ==
In reply to a question put forth by Michael Marshall, Li Chun Sik of North Korea stated at a meeting of the Association of Secretaries General of Parliaments (ASGP) of the Inter-Parliamentary Union:

While candidates could be nominated by anyone, it was the practice for all candidates to be nominated by the parties. These nominations were examined by the United Reunification Front and then by the Central Electoral Committee, which allocated candidates to seats. The candidate in each seat was then considered by the electors in meetings at the workplace or similar, and on election day the electors could then indicate approval or disapproval of the candidate on the ballot paper.

Only one candidate appears on each ballot. Elections are nominally conducted by secret ballot, although in practice the voting process affords no secrecy for dissent. Voting is mandatory and turnout is habitually near 100%. After elections, North Korea submits data to the United Nations on the seat breakup between the WPK and the minor parties. According to North Korea historian Fyodor Tertitskiy, this data is likely falsified as deputies are simply described as WPK members inside North Korea, without mentions of the smaller parties.

Members of the Supreme People's Assembly are elected to five-year terms, and meet for SPA sessions up to ten days per year. The Assembly in turn elects the members of the Standing Committee, which exercises legislative functions for the remainder of the year, when the Assembly is not in session. It also elects the President of the State Affairs Commission, the country's head of state and highest state office, and the premier, the country's head of government.

In 2023, the Standing Committee of the Supreme People's Assembly amended and supplemented North Korea's election law. Minju Choson, the newspaper of the cabinet and the SPA Standing Committee, stated that North Korea would implement a primary-like system in some constituencies, fielding two candidates to pick the nominee in the single-candidate main elections for People's Assemblies at every level. The candidates would be reviewed for qualifications such as loyalty and "revolutionary mindset". Previously, the candidates were solely picked by the WPK, and this change would mark the first competitive elections in North Korea since 1948. The local elections would also drop using the voting system where the voter would cross off the candidate's name to vote against them, switching to using two different colored ballot boxes for "yes" and "no" votes.

=== Local elections ===
Local elections have been held since 1999. The people elect representatives to city, county, and provincial people's assemblies in local elections every four years. The number of representatives is determined by the population of each jurisdiction. In 2023, the introduction of a two-candidate method in some localities, with a primary election to elect the final candidate for the local assembly in these areas, commenced as a trial method.

Regarding this, scholar Andrei Lankov of Kookmin University in Seoul stated that "They have a dual system: there is a mayor/governor, technically elected (but actually appointed), and there is a city/province party secretary. It is the latter who has real power, but mayor/governor can be important in some cases as long as he knows his proper place and does not challenge the Workers' Party of Korea secretary."

== Criticism ==
The elections have been variously described as show elections or a political census. Seats are uncompetitive as all candidates are chosen by the Democratic Front for the Reunification of Korea. Because of the near 100% turnout, elections double as unofficial censuses. The inminban neighborhood watch-style organization reportedly watches the elections to identify and investigate no-shows.

South Korean news reporter, Dae Young-kim, claims that there are separate boxes for "no" votes, where "nobody dared to put his or her ballot". According to Roger Cavazos, a retired US army lieutenant-colonel, voting against the official candidate, or refusing to vote at all, is considered an act of treason, and those who do face the loss of their jobs and housing, along with extra surveillance. Several North Korean defectors have corroborated the danger voting against the official candidate or abstaining from voting supposes.

== Result in history ==
=== 1948 North Korean parliamentary election ===
Party or alliance		Seats
Fatherland Front	Workers' Party of North Korea	157
Fatherland Front	Chondoist Chongu Party	35
Fatherland Front	Korean Democratic Party	35
Fatherland Front	Laboring People's Party	20
Fatherland Front	People's Republic Party	20
Fatherland Front	Democratic Independent Party	20
Fatherland Front	Other parties	171
Fatherland Front	Independents	114
Total		572
Source: Nohlen et al., Yonhap News Agency

=== 2026 North Korean parliamentary election ===
Party	Votes	%	Seats
Workers' Party of Korea		99.93	671
Social organizations		99.93	10
Friendly parties and religious organizations (Note: Friendly parties of the WPK are the Korean Social Democratic Party and the Chondoist Chongu Party)		99.93	6
Against		0.07	–
Total			687
Registered voters/turnout		99.99	
Source: Korean Central News Agency

== Past elections ==
=== Election of Deputies ===
- 1947
- 1948
- 1957
- 1962
- 1967
- 1972
- 1977
- 1982
- 1986
- 1990
- 1998
- 2003
- 2009
- 2014
- 2019
- 2026

=== By-elections ===
- 1959

=== Local elections ===
- 1946
- 1947
- 1949
- 1950
- 1956
- 1959
- 1963
- 1967
- 1972
- 1975
- 1977
- 1979
- 1981
- 1983
- 1985
- 1987
- 1989
- 1991
- 1993
- 1999
- 2003
- 2007
- 2011
- 2015
- 2019
- 2023

== See also ==
- Politics of North Korea
- List of political parties in North Korea
