= 1989 in Korea =

1989 in Korea may refer to:

- 1989 in North Korea
- 1989 in South Korea
