= 1981 in Korea =

1981 in Korea may refer to:

- 1981 in North Korea
- 1981 in South Korea
