= 1982 in Korea =

1982 in Korea may refer to:

- 1982 in North Korea
- 1982 in South Korea
