= 1987 in Korea =

1987 in Korea may refer to:

- 1987 in North Korea
- 1987 in South Korea
