= 1979 in Korea =

1979 in Korea may refer to:

- 1979 in North Korea
- 1979 in South Korea
