= 1975 in Korea =

1975 in Korea may refer to:

- 1975 in North Korea
- 1975 in South Korea
