= 1983 in Korea =

1983 in Korea may refer to:

- 1983 in North Korea
- 1983 in South Korea
