= 1978 in Korea =

1978 in Korea may refer to:

- 1978 in North Korea
- 1978 in South Korea
