= 1985 in Korea =

1985 in Korea may refer to:

- 1985 in North Korea
- 1985 in South Korea
