= 1976 in Korea =

1976 in Korea may refer to:

- 1976 in North Korea
- 1976 in South Korea
