= 1977 in Korea =

1977 in Korea may refer to:

- 1977 in North Korea
- 1977 in South Korea
