= 1973 in Korea =

1973 in Korea may refer to:

- 1973 in North Korea
- 1973 in South Korea
