= 1972 in Korea =

1972 in Korea may refer to:

- 1972 in North Korea
- 1972 in South Korea
