= 1988 in Korea =

1988 in Korea may refer to:

- 1988 in North Korea
- 1988 in South Korea
