= 1974 in Korea =

1974 in Korea may refer to:

- 1974 in North Korea
- 1974 in South Korea
