= 1986 in Korea =

1986 in Korea may refer to:

- 1986 in North Korea
- 1986 in South Korea
