= 1980 in Korea =

1980 in Korea may refer to:

- 1980 in North Korea
- 1980 in South Korea
