= 1984 in Korea =

1984 in Korea may refer to:

- 1984 in North Korea
- 1984 in South Korea
