= 1994 in Korea =

1994 in Korea may refer to:

- 1994 in North Korea
- 1994 in South Korea
