= 1990 in Korea =

1990 in Korea may refer to:

- 1990 in North Korea
- 1990 in South Korea
