= 1995 in Korea =

1995 in Korea may refer to:

- 1995 in North Korea
- 1995 in South Korea
