= Kim Byung-hoon =

Kim Byung-hoon or Gim Byung-hoon (Korean: 김병훈) may refer to:

- Kim Byung-hoon (field hockey) (born 1982), South Korean field hockey player
- Kim Byung-hoon (entrepreneur) (born 1988), South Korean entrepreneur
