= 1982 in South Korea =

- Centuries: 20th; 21st
- Decades: 1960s; 1970s; 1980s; 1990s; 2000s
- See also: Other events in 1982; Years in South Korea; Timeline of Korean history 1982 in North Korea

Events from the year 1982 in South Korea.

== Incumbents ==
- President: Chun Doo-hwan
- Prime Minister:
  - until 4 January: Nam Duck-woo
  - 4 January-24 June: Yoo Chang-soon
  - starting 24 June: Kim Sang-hyup

== Births ==
- 2 January - Kim Ji-hyun, actress
- 3 January - Park Ji-yoon, singer, actress and model
- 4 January - Kang Hye-jung, actress and singer
- 11 January - Son Ye-jin, actress
- 15 January - Kang Se-jung, actress
- 17 January - Hwanhee, singer and actor
- 26 January - KCM, singer
- 1 February - Kim Jong-wook, singer
- 2 February - Han Ga-in, actress
- 2 February - Kan Mi-youn, singer, actress, radio host, model, fashion designer, and businesswoman
- 5 February - Wheesung, R&B singer, record producer, and musical theatre actor
- 11 February - Hwayobi, R&B singer-songwriter
- 20 February - Chang Kiha, singer-songwriter, actor and radio host
- 1 March - Kim Min-hee, actress
- 4 March - Ha Seok-jin, actor
- 24 March - Han Chae-ah, actor
- 17 April - Lee Joon-gi, actor, singer, dancer, model
- 3 May - Joo Hyun-Jung, archer
- 10 May - Boom, singer, actor, radio host, and television presenter
- 16 May - Ju Ji-hoon, actor, model
- 18 May - Lim Ju-hwan, actor
- 22 May - Kim Mu-yeol, actor
- 5 June - Yoo In-na, actress, DJ
- 25 June - Rain, singer-songwriter, actor, and music producer
- 29 June - Kwon Yul, actor
- 30 July - Kim Min-jung, actress
- 4 August - Jeon Mi-do, actress
- 25 August - Jung Jung-suk, footballer
- 26 August - Lee El, actress
- 13 September - Han Chae-young, actress
- 14 September - Shin Dong-wook, actor
- 23 September - Lee Ha-na, actress
- 25 September - Hyun Bin, actor
- 4 October - Grace Lee, host and radio DJ based in the Philippines
- 13 October - Jo Yoon-hee, actress
- 16 October - Kim Ah-joong, actress
- 18 October - Park Hyun-bin, singer
- 5 November - Han Ji-min, actress
- 16 November - Lim Kyung-hee, athlete
- 23 November - Shin Sung-rok, actor
- 14 December - Koo Kyo-hwan, actor
- 17 December - Song Won-geun, singer and actor
- 25 December - Jang Ja-yeon, actress (d. 2009)

== Deaths ==
- 27 April - Woo Bum-kon, policeman and mass murderer (b. 1955)
- 18 November - Kim Duk-koo, boxer (b. 1959)

== See also ==
- List of South Korean films of 1982
- Years in Japan
- Years in North Korea
