= Gwangsan No clan =

Korean clan from Gwangju

Gwangsan Noh clan
- Country: Korea
- Current region: Gwangju
- Founder: Noh Hae
- Connected members: Roh Moo-hyun; Lho Shin-yong; Noh Joo-hyun; Noh Jin-hyuk

Gwangsan Noh clan (Korean: 광산 노씨; Hanja: 光山 盧氏) was one of the Korean clans. Their Bon-gwan was in Gwangju. According to the research in 2015, the number of Gwangsan Noh clan was 102329. Their founder was Noh Hae. His father, Noh Su, fled from China with his children to avoid An Lushan Rebellion happened in 755. Noh Hae (Hanja: 盧垓), eldest son of Noh Su(Hanja: 盧穂), was appointed as Prince of Gwangsan (Hanja: 光山伯) and began Gwangsan Noh clan.

== See also ==
- Korean clan names of foreign origin
