= 1983 in South Korea =

- Centuries: 20th; 21st
- Decades: 1960s; 1970s; 1980s; 1990s; 2000s
- See also: Other events in 1983; Years in South Korea; Timeline of Korean history 1983 in North Korea

Events from the year 1983 in South Korea.

== Incumbents ==
- President: Chun Doo-hwan
- Prime Minister: Kim Sang-hyup (until 14 October), Chin Iee-chong (starting 14 October)

== Events ==
- 1 September – Korean Air Flight 007 was shot down by a Soviet SU-15 Interceptor.
- 9 October – Rangoon bombing: North Korean agents planted a bomb in an attempt to assassinate President Chun. However, the bomb exploded prematurely, killing several high-ranking South Korean officials and four Burmese nationals. President Chun narrowly escaped the attack.

== Births ==
- January 1 - Park Sung-hyun, archer
- February 7 - Son Suk-ku, actor
- February 16 - Lee Min-jung, actress
- April 18 - Jang Nam-seok, footballer
- April 30 - Yun Mi-jin, archer
- May 11 - Park Hee-von, actress, singer, TV host and model
- May 24 - Woo Seung-yeon, model and actress (died 2009)
- June 3 - Shinsadong Tiger, music producer and songwriter (died 2024)
- July 1 - Leeteuk, singer-songwriter, TV host, presenter, actor
- July 10 - Kim Hee-chul, singer-songwriter, TV host, model, actor and director
- October 8 - Lee Sang-hee, actress
- November 7 - Ivy, singer

== See also ==
- List of South Korean films of 1983
- Years in Japan
- Years in North Korea
