= 2001 in Korea =

2001 in Korea may refer to:

- 2001 in North Korea
- 2001 in South Korea
