= 1987 in South Korea =

- Centuries: 20th; 21st
- Decades: 1960s; 1970s; 1980s; 1990s; 2000s
- See also: Other events in 1987; Years in South Korea; Timeline of Korean history 1987 in North Korea

Events from the year 1987 in South Korea.

== Incumbents ==
- President: Chun Doo-hwan
- Prime Minister:
  - until 26 May: Lho Shin-yong
  - 26 May-14 July: Lee Han-key
  - starting 14 July: Kim Chung-yul

== Events ==
- June 10 - June Struggle
- November 29 - Korean Air Flight 858 was blown by the detonated bomb by the North Korean agents.

== Births ==
- January 11 - Kim Young-kwang, actor, model
- January 13 - Lee Seung-gi, singer, actor, TV host and entertainer
- March 13 - Lee Young-sil, field hockey player
- April 20 - Park Mi-ra, handball player
- May 6 - Moon Geun-young, actress
- May 8 - Kim Eun-hye, sport shooter
- May 13 - Chang Hye-jin, archer
- June 3 - Han Ji-eun, actress
- June 21 - Kim Ryeowook, singer
- June 22 - Lee Min-ho, actor
- July 1 - Ahn Jae-hyun, model and actor
- July 5 - Ji Chang-wook, actor
- September 9 - Jung Il-woo, actor and TV host
- September 20 - Gain, singer
- September 30 - Joo Won, actor
- October 5 - Park Soyeon, singer and actress
- October 23 - Seo In-guk, singer-songwriter and actor
- October 30 - Kim Dong-ah, politician
- October 31 - Sim Hae-in, handball player
- November 4 - T.O.P, singer, rapper and actor
- November 21 - Jang Soo-ji, field hockey player
- November 25 - An Hyo-ju, field hockey player

== Deaths ==
- June 22 - Yun Il-seon, politician, pathologist, and anatomist (b. 1896)

=== Full date unknown ===
- Kim Se-jin, activist (b. 1965)

== See also ==
- List of South Korean films of 1987
- Years in Japan
- Years in North Korea
