= Elections in Korea =

Elections in Korea can refer to:

- Elections in North Korea
- Elections in South Korea
