= 1996 in Korea =

1996 in Korea may refer to:

- 1996 in North Korea
- 1996 in South Korea
