= Bjørn Kristoffer Bore =

Norwegian newspaper editor (born 1969)

- Born: 3 December 1969 (age 56); Molde Municipality, Norway
- Education: University of Oslo
- Occupation: Newspaper editor
- Employers: Schibsted Nett; Dagbladet; Vårt Land
- Organisation: Nature and Youth
- Spouse: Anne Weider Aasen
- Father: Thor Bjarne Bore

Bjørn Kristoffer Bore (born 3 December 1969) is a Norwegian journalist and newspaper editor. Since 2019 he has been chief editor of the newspaper Vårt Land.

== Personal life and education ==
Born in Molde Municipality on 3 December 1969, Bore is a son of newspaper editor Thor Bjarne Bore and journalist Marie Rein Bore. He studied informatics and graduated in political science and criminology from the University of Oslo from 1989 to 1992. He is married to Anne Weider Aasen, TV 2 editor and since 2020 leader of the Norwegian Press Complaints Commission.

== Career ==
From 1992 to 1994 Bore was chief executive officer of the organization Natur og Ungdom. He was a web journalist for Schibsted Nett from 2005. In 2008 he was hired as a journalist for the newspaper Dagbladet, and eventually assumed various administrative positions in the newspaper. He was appointed chief editor and managing director of the newspaper Vårt Land from 2019.
