= Kim Se-jin =

- Hangul: 김세진
- RR: Gim Sejin
- MR: Kim Sejin

Kim Se-jin (Korean: 김세진) is a Korean name consisting of the family name Kim and the given name Se-jin, and may also refer to:

- Kim Se-jin (activist) (1965-1987), South Korean activist
- Kim Se-jin (volleyball) (born 1974), South Korean volleyball player
- Kim Se-jin (handballer) (born 2005), South Korean handball player
