= 1992 in Korea =

1992 in Korea may refer to:

- 1992 in North Korea
- 1992 in South Korea
