= 2000 in Korea =

2000 in Korea may refer to:

- 2000 in North Korea
- 2000 in South Korea
