= 1988 in South Korea =

- Centuries: 20th; 21st
- Decades: 1960s; 1970s; 1980s; 1990s; 2000s
- See also: Other events in 1988; Years in South Korea; Timeline of Korean history 1988 in North Korea

Events from the year 1988 in South Korea.

== Incumbents ==
- President: Chun Doo-hwan (until 24 February), Roh Tae-woo (starting 24 February)
- Prime Minister:
  - until 25 February: Kim Chung-yul
  - 25 February-2 March: Lee Hyun-jae (acting)
  - 2 March-5 December: Lee Hyun-jae
  - starting 5 December: Kang Young-hoon

== Events ==
- September 17 - October 2 – 1988 Summer Olympics are held in Seoul.

== Births ==
- January 7 - Lim Ju-eun, actress
- January 10 - Solji, vocalist (EXID)
- January 15 - Jun. K, vocalist (2PM)
- February 3 - Cho Kyuhyun, singer and actor
- February 16 - Kim Soo-hyun actor
- February 18 – Changmin, singer, songwriter and occasional actor
- February 20 - Ki Bo-bae, archer
- March 10 - Kang In-soo, singer
- March 12 - Kim Ji-yeon, fencer
- April 1 - Jung Hae-in, actor
- April 8 - Kim Myung-sung, baseball player
- April 14 - Kim Shin-wook, footballer
- April 24 - Jinri Park, model, DJ and actress based in the Philippines
- April 25 - Dasuri Choi, dancer and entertainer based in the Philippines
- May 18 - Taeyang, singer and dancer
- May 24 - Jeon Yeong-Eun, athlete
- July 1 - Sun So-eun, swimmer
- July 12 - Inbee Park, golfer
- August 8 - Kim Min-jeong, judoka
- August 18 - G-Dragon, singer-songwriter, rapper and record producer
- September 6 - Kim On-a, handball player
- November 5 - Kim Byung-hoon, entrepreneur.

== Deaths ==
- March - Shin Eui-kyung, activist
- September 18 - Heo Jeong, politician and Korean independence activist (b. 1896)

== See also ==
- List of South Korean films of 1988
- Years in Japan
- Years in North Korea
