= 1993 in North Korea =

- Centuries: 20th; 21st
- Decades: 1970s; 1980s; 1990s; 2000s; 2010s
- See also: Other events of 1993; Years in North Korea; Timeline of Korean history 1993 in South Korea

Events from the year 1993 in North Korea.

== Incumbents ==
- Premier: Kang Song-san
- Supreme Leader: Kim Il Sung

== Census ==
The 1993 North Korea Census recorded the population of North Korea as 21,213,478 inhabitants. The life expectancy at birth was of 70.7 years (67.8 for males and 73.9 for females).

== Events ==
- 1993 North Korean missile test
- Local elections
- May 11-United Nations Security Council Resolution 825 resolved that the inspector from the IAEA should go to North Korea.

== Births ==
- Ri Il-jin
