= 1991 in North Korea =

- Centuries: 20th; 21st
- Decades: 1970s; 1980s; 1990s; 2000s; 2010s
- See also: Other events in 1991; Years in North Korea; Timeline of Korean history 1991 in South Korea

Events from the year 1991 in North Korea.

== Incumbents ==
- Supreme Leader and President: Kim Il Sung
- Premier: Yon Hyong-muk

== Events ==
- 24 November – 1991 North Korean local elections

== Births ==
- 1 January – Sim Hyon-jin.
- 8 February – Ri Yong-jik.
- 21 October – Kim Un-hyang.

== Deaths ==
- 11 May – Ho Dam, 4th Foreign Minister of North Korea (b. 1929).
