= 1999 in Korea =

1999 in Korea may refer to:

- 1999 in North Korea
- 1999 in South Korea
