= 1989 in North Korea =

- Centuries: 20th; 21st
- Decades: 1960s; 1970s; 1980s; 1990s; 2000s
- See also: Other events in 1989; Years in North Korea; Timeline of Korean history 1989 in South Korea

Events from the year 1989 in North Korea.

== Incumbents ==
- Premier: Yon Hyong-muk
- Supreme Leader: Kim Il Sung

== Events ==
- 1–8 July 1989: 13th World Festival of Youth and Students in Pyongyang
- 19 November – 1989 North Korean local elections

== Births ==
- 9 March - Hong Un-jong
- 19 April - Kim Jong
