= Hou Juncheng =

Chinese billionaire businessman

- Born: 1963 or 1964 (age 62–63)
- Education: Tsinghua University
- Occupation: Businessman
- Title: Chairman and founder, Proya Cosmetics

Hou Juncheng (Chinese: 侯军呈; born 1963/1964) is a Chinese billionaire businessman. He is the founder and chairman of Proya Cosmetics.

== Early life ==
Hou earned a degree from Tsinghua University.

== Career ==
Hou began his career in 1982 at the age of 18, working as an auto parts repairman to support his mother following the sudden death of his father. A decade later, he entered the cosmetics industry by joining a beauty distribution business established by his four older sisters in Yiwu, a manufacturing hub in Zhejiang province. In this role, Hou was responsible for managing external relations and liaising with manufacturers.

In 2006, Hou founded Proya Cosmetics in Zhejiang Province. Proya is headquartered in Hangzhou and employs 2,720 people.

In January 2020, with shares in Proya closing at a record high, Hou had an estimate net worth of US$1.2 billion.
