= 2019 North Korean local elections =

Elections in North Korea to the provincial (municipal), city (district) and county people's assemblies in North Korea were held on 21 July 2019. These elections elected the state's organs of power.

== Preparations ==
On 10 June 2019, the Presidium of the Supreme People's Assembly released a report announcing an election for the local people's committees scheduled for 21 July 2019.

On 13 June, the SPA Presidium issued Decision No. 7 which organized a central election guidance committee for the local people's assembly elections that consisted of Thae Hyong-chol as chairman, Kim Phyong-hae as vice-chairman, Jong Yong-guk as secretary, and Choe Pu-il, Kim Yong-ho, Pak Chol-min, Jo Yong-gil, Kim Chang-yop, and Jang Chun-sil as members.

On 22 June, Rodong Sinmun reported that constituencies and sub-constituencies for the election have been organized.

On 24 June, Rodong Sinmun reported that constituency and sub-constituency election committees have been organized.

On 7 July, Rodong Sinmun reported that constituency and sub-constituency election committees have displayed lists of eligible voters for the election.

On 20 July, Rodong Sinmun reported that the nomination and registration of candidates has been completed on 17 July, and that profiles of candidates in the election have been displayed at all constituencies, and polling stations have been set up.

== Election day ==
Voting began at 9:00 AM local time, with the Central Election Guidance Committee(중앙선거지도위원회) reporting that the voter turnout reached 72.07% by 12:00 PM local time.

The Central Election Guidance Committee reported that the voter turnout reached 99.98% at the end of the voting.

Kim Jong Un was reported to have cast his vote for Ju Song-ho(주성호) and Jong Song-sik(정송식) at Sub-Constituency No. 94 of Constituency No. 201 of South Hamgyong Province.

== Results ==
The Central Election Guidance Committee said in a report on 22 July that 27,876 local people's assembly deputies were elected with all of them receiving 100% of the vote.

== See also ==
- Elections in North Korea
