= 1985 in South Korea =

- Centuries: 20th; 21st
- Decades: 1960s; 1970s; 1980s; 1990s; 2000s
- See also: Other events in 1985; Years in South Korea; Timeline of Korean history 1985 in North Korea

Events from the year 1985 in South Korea.

== Incumbents ==
- President: Chun Doo-hwan
- Prime Minister: Shin Byung-hyun (until 18 February), Lho Shin-yong (starting 18 February)

== Events ==
Politics

The 12th National Assembly election, held on February 12, 1985. Representing the Democratic Justice Party (DJP), the president of the republic, President: Chun Doo-hwan, was elected indirectly by the presidential electoral college of more than 5,000 electors, chosen by the general voters. Korean voters turned out in unusually large numbers, 84.6% of a total 23,987,830 voters. The DJP still retained the majority but it lost three seats that it previously won in 1981, only securing 87 seats. The popular vote for the DJP also declined from 35.6% in 1981 to 35.3% in 1985. On February 19, President Chun appoints Lho Sin-young as prime minister.

Student Activism

In 1985, students were very opposed to President Chun and his government, and they acted upon it. The Ministry of Education reported that there was a total of 3,877 on-campus rallies, demonstrations, and other disturbances, with nearly half of all of them occurring in the first semester of 1985. Radical student organizations were also formed, including the Sammintu (Sanmin Struggle Committee). They represented the struggle for “national unification, emancipation of the masses, and the establishment of democracy.” The organization was branded as pro-Communist and anti-American and they were responsible for the seizure of the USIS library in downtown Seoul. They occupied it for three days, May 23 to May 26, although they surrendered in peace, their drawn out public trials made a mockery of South Korea's legal process forcing the minister of Justice, Kim Suk-hwi to resign.

Inter-Korean Relations

The first exchange of visits between Seoul, South Korea and Pyongyang, North Korea. It consisted of 50 hometown visitors, 50 folk-art performers, 30 newsmen, and 20 support personnel. Although there 100 hometown visitors total only 35 in Pyongyang and 30 in Seoul were briefly reunited.

Economy

Unemployment rate was kept around 4%. Construction for the upcoming Olympics contributed to a sagging economy. Hyundai motor cars were selling well but catering to a low-priced market. South Korean shipbuilding and overseas construction suffered. The Kukje Group, South Korea's seventh largest conglomerate, which operated the largest single footwear factory in the world, collapsed. The government had a target of 7.5% growth in GDP but had to scale that down to 5%. South Korea had an accumulative foreign debt of around $45 billion, most of which was owed to Japan.

- July 27 – The 63 Building officially opens as the tallest skyscraper outside of North America in Yeouido, Seoul, South Korea.

== Births ==
- January 16 - Lee Min-ki, actor, singer and model
- January 25
  - Claudia Kim, actress and model
- February 8 – Seo Min-woo, idol singer and actor (d. 2018)
- February 27 - Seo Hyun-jin, actress
- March 1
  - Yun Ok-Hee, archer
  - Kang Young-mi, fencer
- March 7 - Lee Sung-jin, archer
- April 26 - Nam Gyu-ri, actress and singer
- August 5 - Shin So-yul, actress
- September 19 - Song Joong-ki, actor
- October 7 - Kim Bo-mi, field hockey player
- November 27 - Park Soo-jin, actress

== Deaths ==
- December 28 - Chu Song-woong, actor (b. 1941)
- December 3 - Oh Sangwon, writer and journalist (b. 1930)

== See also ==
- List of South Korean films of 1985
- Years in Japan
- Years in North Korea
