= Borinara Hagwon Farm =

Korean barley farm in Gochang County, South Korea

Borinara Hagwon Farm is a large scale barley farm and a tourist attraction in South Korea. It is located in Gochang County and occupies more than 561,983 square meters.

== History ==
It was founded by Chin Iee-chong in the 1960s. The farm hosts Gochang Green Barley Field Festival every year.
