= 1985 in North Korea =

- Centuries: 20th; 21st
- Decades: 1960s; 1970s; 1980s; 1990s; 2000s
- See also: Other events in 1985; Years in North Korea; Timeline of Korean history 1985 in South Korea

Events from the year 1985 in North Korea.

== Incumbents ==
- Premier: Kang Song-san
- Supreme Leader: Kim Il Sung

== Events ==
- 24 February – 1985 North Korean local elections
- 4 June – Pochonbo Electronic Ensemble Formed

== Births ==
- 2 July - Pak Nam-chol
- 2 September - Cha Jong-hyok
- 5 September - Pak Chol-jin
