= 1999 in North Korea =

- Centuries: 20th; 21st
- Decades: 1970s; 1980s; 1990s; 2000s; 2010s
- See also: Other events of 1999; Years in North Korea; Timeline of Korean history 1999 in South Korea

Events from the year 1999 in North Korea.

== Incumbents ==
- Premier: Hong Song-nam
- Supreme Leader: Kim Jong-il

== Events ==
- 1994~1999: Arduous March
- 7 March: 1999 North Korean local elections
- 3–7 June: Kim Yong Nam, Chairman of the Standing Committee of the Supreme People's Assembly, led a delegation to China, which ended strained ties since China's recognition of South Korea in 1992.
- 9–15 June: First Battle of Yeonpyeong

== Deaths ==
- 21 July – Kim Pyong-sik, former Vice President of North Korea (b. 1919).
- 23 September – Ri Jong-ok, 4th Premier of North Korea (b. 1916).

== See also ==
- Years in Japan
- Years in South Korea
