= Mediehuset Vårt Land =

Norwegian media company

- Genre: Media
- Headquarters: Oslo, Norway
- Key people: Håkon Jahr (chair)
- Owner: Various

Mediehuset Vårt Land AS is a Norwegian media company.

It owns 100% of the newspaper Vårt Land, 66% of Dagsavisen, 20% of Korsets Seier and 100% of the magazine Programbladet. In addition it owns 100% of the company Mentor Medier and 90.1% of Sunnmørsavisene. Mediehuset Vårt Land is owned 10.0% by Mushom Invest, 5.7% by Normisjon and 84.3% by other interests.
