= 1998 in North Korea =

- Centuries: 20th; 21st
- Decades: 1970s; 1980s; 1990s; 2000s; 2010s
- See also: Other events of 1998; Years in North Korea; Timeline of Korean history 1998 in South Korea

Events from the year 1998 in North Korea.

== Incumbents ==
- Premier: Hong Song-nam (acting until 5 September)
- Supreme Leader: Kim Jong Il

== Events ==
1994~1998:Arduous March

North Korea had participated in the 1998 winter olympics in Nagano, Japan.

22 June:1998 Sokcho submarine incident

26 July:1998 North Korean parliamentary election

31 August:Launch of Kwangmyŏngsŏng-1, a machine claimed to be a North Korean rocket but suspected as missile tests.

5 September: The newly amended prologue for the Socialist Constitution of the Democratic People's Republic of Korea addresses Kim Il Sung as the "Eternal president" of North Korea.

== Births ==
- 8 February – Choe Song-hyok, footballer
- 3 March – Ri Yong-gwon, footballer
- 9 March – So Jong-gil, footballer
- 13 March – Ri Chol-song, footballer
- 15 March – Ri Pom-hyang, footballer
- 21 March – Jang Song-il, footballer
- 21 June – Ju Hyo-sim, footballer
- 11 September – Han Kwang-song, footballer
- 30 September – Ri Chung-gyu, footballer
- 11 November – Choe Ok-chol, footballer
- 20 November – Choe Jin-nam, footballer

== See also ==
- Years in Japan
- Years in South Korea
