= 1973 in South Korea =

- Centuries: 20th; 21st
- Decades: 1950s; 1960s; 1970s; 1980s; 1990s
- See also: Other events in 1973; Years in South Korea; Timeline of Korean history 1973 in North Korea

Events from the year 1973 in South Korea.

== Incumbents ==
- President: Park Chung-hee
- Prime Minister: Kim Jong-pil

== Events ==
- August 8 - Kidnapping of Kim Dae-jung

== Births ==
- February 11 - Jeon Do-yeon.
- February 15 - Shin Eun-kyung
- March 20 - Jung Woo-sung.
- June 30 - Chan Ho Park.
- November 2 - Anne Weider Aasen, media executive.
- November 20 - Han Jung-soo, actor

== See also ==
- List of South Korean films of 1973
- Years in Japan
- Years in North Korea
