= 1979 in North Korea =

- Centuries: 20th; 21st
- Decades: 1950s; 1960s; 1970s; 1980s; 1990s
- See also: Other events in 1979; Years in North Korea; Timeline of Korean history 1979 in South Korea

Events from the year 1979 in North Korea.

== Incumbents ==
- Premier: Li Jong-ok
- Supreme Leader: Kim Il Sung
- President: Kim Il Sung
- Vice President: Kang Ryang-uk (alongside Pak Song-chol and Kim Il)

== Events ==
- 11 March – 1979 North Korean local elections

== Births ==
- 19 September - Kim Hyang-mi
- 23 September - Kim Un-chol

== See also ==
- Years in Japan
- Years in South Korea
