= 1983 in North Korea =

- Centuries: 20th; 21st
- Decades: 1960s; 1970s; 1980s; 1990s; 2000s
- See also: Other events in 1983; Years in North Korea; Timeline of Korean history 1983 in South Korea

Events from the year 1983 in North Korea.

== Incumbents ==
- Premier: Li Jong-ok
- Supreme Leader: Kim Il Sung
- President: Kim Il Sung
- Vice President: Kang Ryang-uk (until 9 January), Rim Chun-chu (starting April, alongside Pak Song-chol and Kim Il)

== Events ==
- 6 March – Local elections
- 1 July – Chosonminhang Ilyushin Il-62 crash
- 9 October – Rangoon bombing

== Births ==
- 8 January - Kim Jong Un, Supreme Leader of North Korea since 2011 and the leader of the Workers' Party of Korea (WPK) since 2012, son of the Eternal General Secretary Kim Jong Il and grandson of the Eternal President Kim Il Sung.
- 6 May - Kim Mi-yong.
- 15 July - Kim Myong-won.
- 19 July - Kim Yong-jun.
