= 1986 in South Korea =

- Centuries: 20th; 21st
- Decades: 1960s; 1970s; 1980s; 1990s; 2000s
- See also: Other events in 1986; Years in South Korea; Timeline of Korean history 1986 in North Korea

Events from the year 1986 in South Korea.

== Incumbents ==
- President: Chun Doo-hwan
- Prime Minister: Lho Shin-yong

== Births ==
- January 15 – Han Hye-lyoung, field hockey player
- January 26 – Park Mi-hyun, field hockey player
- February 3 – Kim Joon, singer, rapper and actor
- February 5 – Kim Min-woo, figure skater
- February 18 – Kim Jong-eun, field hockey player
- February 28 – Choi Eun-sook fencer
- March 4 – Park Min-young, actress
- March 13 - Oh Hye-won, actress
- March 22 – Jeon Boram, singer and actress
- April 4 – Eunhyuk, singer-songwriter, radio personality
- May 12 – Im Dong-hyun, archer
- May 29 – No Min-woo, actor and musician
- May 31 – Jang Hee-sun, field hockey player
- June 1 – Lee Jang-woo, actor and singer
- June 4 – Yoochun, singer-songwriter and actor
- June 6 - Kim Hyun-joong, singer and actor
- July 5 – Yeon Woo-jin, actor and model
- August 16 – Kim Oh-sung, footballer
- September 23 – Shin A-lam, fencer
- September 26 – Yoon Shi-yoon, actor and television personality
- September 27 – Bae Seul-ki, singer and actress
- September 30 – Ki Hong Lee, actor
- October 6 – Yoo Ah-in, actor
- October 15 – Donghae, singer-songwriter, actor, radio personality
- November 5 – BoA, singer, songwriter, record producer and actress
- November 9 – Koo Hye-sun, actress, singer-songwriter, director and artist
- November 19 – Kwak Jung-hye, sport shooter

== See also ==
- List of South Korean films of 1986
- Years in Japan
- Years in North Korea
