= 1981 in South Korea =

- Centuries: 20th; 21st
- Decades: 1960s; 1970s; 1980s; 1990s; 2000s
- See also: Other events in 1981; Years in South Korea; Timeline of Korean history 1981 in North Korea

Events from the year 1981 in South Korea.

== Incumbents ==
- President: Chun Doo-hwan
- Prime Minister: Nam Duck-woo

== Events ==
- September 30 - The International Olympic Committee awards the 1988 Summer Olympics to the city of Seoul, South Korea.

== Births ==
- 10 January - Brian Joo, singer-songwriter, actor and TV host
- 14 January - Jung Woo, actor
- 18 January - Gang Dong-won, actor
- 21 January - Andy Lee, singer
- 28 January - Lee Yu-ri, actress
- 5 February - Lee Eon, actor and model (d. 2008)
- 6 February - Shim Eun-jin, singer and actress
- 10 February - Cho Yeo-jeong, actress
- 12 February - Kim San-ho, actor
- 14 February - Kim Hwan-sung, singer (NRG) (d. 2000)
- 26 February - Song Hye-kyo, actress
- 3 March
  - Eugene, singer and actress
  - Sung Yu-ri, singer and actress
- 18 March - Jang Na-ra, singer and actress
- 19 March - Kim Rae-won, actor
- 1 April - Yeon Woo, singer
- 8 April - Gummy, singer
- 14 - April - Kim Byung-chae, footballer
- 3 May - U;Nee, singer, rapper, dancer and actress (d. 2007)
- 9 May - Kim Ji-hoon, actor
- 12 May - Kim Tae-woo, singer
- 28 July - Zo In-sung, actor
- 15 August
  - Lee Sang-yoon, actor
  - Song Ji-hyo, actress, model and TV host
- 22 August - Jang Hyun-kyu, footballer (d. 2012)
- 9 September - Jung Jong-kwan, footballer (d. 2011)
- 16 September - Lee Jin-wook, actor
- 18 September
  - Han Ye-seul, actress
  - JeA, singer-songwriter
- 29 September - Nam Hyun-hee, fencer
- 16 October - Go Joo-won, actor
- 23 October - Shoo, singer and actress
- 30 October - Jun Ji-hyun, actress and model
- 2 November - Miryo, rapper, songwriter and record producer
- 6 November - Lee Dong-wook, actor, TV host and model
- 25 December - Lee Young Hyun, singer (Big Mama)
- 26 December - Seorak, singer and VJ
- 28 December - Narsha, singer and actress
- 30 December - K.Will, singer

== See also ==
- Years in Japan
- Years in North Korea
