= 2023 North Korean local elections =

Elections to the provincial (municipal), city (district) and county people's assemblies were held in North Korea on 26 November 2023. North Korea's state media reported opposing votes for the first time since 1956, when approval rates stayed below 100 percent in two local elections.

== Preparations ==
The Standing Committee of the Supreme People's Assembly issued a report on 16 October 2023 which scheduled elections for the local people's assemblies on 26 November.

On 19 October, the Standing Committee of the Supreme People's Assembly issued Decision No. 242 which created a central election guidance committee consisting of Kang Yun Sok as chairman, Jon Kyong Chol as vice chairman, Ko Kil Son as secretary general and Ri Chol Hun, Kil Pong Chan, Ri Thae Sop, Kim Kum Chol, Ko Jong Bom, Mun Chol, Han Jong Hyok, Kim Jong Sun, Kim Song Ho and Jon Song Min as members.

The Korean Central News Agency reported on 26 October that constituency and sub-constituency committees were organized for the election. This is the first election after the revision of the election law. The new legislation allowed two candidates to be recommended in some constituencies and held a primary election to decide on a final single candidate.

== Results ==
Party	Votes (%)	
Party	Province	City/County
Fatherland Front	99.91	99.87
Reject	0.09	0.13
Turnout	99.63	

The authorities set up two separate ballot boxes of different colors at polling stations, one for approval and the other for disapproval. South Korean Unification Ministry said it hampered the principle of secret voting as it is easy to see whether people vote for or against.

According to the Central Election Guidance Committee, the turnout of the election was 99.63%, slightly decreased from 99.98% four years ago, with 0.37% of the population not voting due to being overseas and 0.000078% abstaining from the election. In the provincial assembly elections, 99.91% of votes were in support, with 0.09% against; 99.87% of votes in city and county assemblies were in support with 0.13% against and in total electing 27,858 deputies to the assemblies.

That North Korea reported the first opposition votes in local elections in decades was seen as an attempt to portray itself as a democratic country. South Korea's Yonhap News Agency said the "rare revelation of opposing votes ... may be intended to show that it democratically held the election" after altering the electoral system, and adjusted the turnout "in order to give an impression that the latest elections were free elections". The Korea Institute for National Unification, a South Korean state-run think tank, said the lower turnout could indicate the weakening control of the regime "as the number of citizens who are elusive from state supervision probably rose".

== See also ==
- Elections in North Korea
