= Anne Weider Aasen =

Norwegian editor and media executive

- Born: 2 November 1973 (age 52); Seoul, South Korea
- Education: Oslo University College; University of Oslo
- Occupations: Editor and media executive
- Employer(s): TV 2 NRK
- Spouse: Bjørn Kristoffer Bore
- Relatives: Thor Bjarne Bore (father-in-law)

Anne Weider Aasen (born 2 November 1973) is a Norwegian editor and media executive. Since 2024 she has been news director at NRK.

== Personal life and education ==
She was born in Seoul, South Korea, on 2 November 1973. Adopted from South Korea to Norway, she produced a documentary about finding her biological mother in 2003.

Aasen graduated as journalist from Oslo University College in 1998, and further graduated in English and Chinese languages from the University of Oslo. She is married to newspaper editor Bjørn Kristoffer Bore, and thus daughter-in-law of newspaper editor Thor Bjarne Bore.

== Career ==
Aasen worked for the Norwegian television channel TV 2 from 1998 to 2024, first as reporter, and eventually editor and media executive. She was assigned as news director for NRK in 2024.

She has been leader of the Norwegian Press Complaints Commission since 2020, and currently serves as leader of the commission for the period 2024 to 2026.
