= 1984 in South Korea =

- Centuries: 20th; 21st
- Decades: 1960s; 1970s; 1980s; 1990s; 2000s
- See also: Other events in 1984; Years in South Korea; Timeline of Korean history 1984 in North Korea

Events from the year 1984 in South Korea.

== Incumbents ==
- President: Chun Doo-hwan
- Prime Minister: Chin Iee-chong

== Births ==
- January 5
  - Min Young-won, actress
  - Yoo In-young, actress
- January 8 - Yeojin Jeon, actress
- January 18 - Seung-Hui Cho, mass murderer (d. 2007)
- March 24 - Park Bom, singer
- April 11 - Yoo Yeon-seok, actor
- April 17 - Lee Si-young, actress, boxer
- June 16 - Jeon Hee-sook, fencer
- June 27 - Son Ho-jun, actor
- July 4 - Lee Je-hoon, actor, director and screenwriter
- July 16 - Yoo Hyun-ji, handball player
- August 6 - Choi Hyeon-ju, archer
- August 7 - Yun Hyon-seok, poet, writer and LGBT activist (d. 2003)
- August 24 - Seo Ji-hye, actress
- August 25 - Ayumi Lee, singer, actress, TV host
- October 3 - Yoon Eun-hye, actress
- November 12 - Sandara Park, singer, actress, TV host
- November 15 - Huh Gak, singer
- November 17 - Park Han-byul, actress and model
- November 20 - Ali, singer-songwriter
- November 29 - Ji Hyun-woo, actor and musician
- December 25 - Hwang Jung-eum, actress

== Deaths ==
- June 16 - Park In-chon, businessman (b. 1901)

== See also ==
- List of South Korean films of 1984
- Years in Japan
- Years in North Korea
