= 1959 North Korean parliamentary by-election =

- 19 July 1959

59 vacated seats in the Supreme People's Assembly
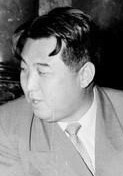

	First party	Second party
Leader	Kim Il Sung	Pak Sin-dok
Party	Workers' Party	Chondoist Chongu
Alliance	Fatherland Front	Fatherland Front
Seats before	150	3
Seats won	55	1
Seats after	205	4
Seat change	▲55	▲1
Premier before election
Kim Il Sung
Workers' Party
Premier
Kim Il Sung
Workers' Party

Parliamentary by-elections were held in North Korea on 19 July 1959 in 56 electoral districts. The reason for the by-election was an unusually high number of vacancies – more than a quarter of seats – in the Supreme People's Assembly.

== Background ==
The vacancies were caused by purges in the aftermath of an attempted coup d'état known as the August Faction Incident in 1956. Although there had been scheduled parliamentary elections in the meantime, in 1957, the purges continued into 1959. By the time of the by-election, 51 deputies had been purged and an additional five had died. Of those purged, 28 were members of the Workers' Party of Korea (WPK), seven from the Korean Democratic Party, eight from the Chondoist Chongu Party, three independents, two from the People's Republic Party (Inmin Konghwadang), two from the Laboring People's Party, and one from the Union of People's Masses (Gonmin People's alliance,건민회).

== Conduct ==
The Central Committee of the WPK forbade any mention about the upcoming elections in the media, probably in order to hide the true scope of the purges. Voters were simply informed that seats in their constituencies were open due to "anti-people activities" by their former delegates.

55 candidates of the WPK stood for election in as many single-candidate constituencies. Pak Sin-dok, the chairman of the Chondoist Chongu Party, stood in the remaining constituency. The voting procedure had been amended slightly from the previous election which had been criticized as undemocratic abroad: In 1957 there had been a white ballot box for votes "for" and a black one for votes "against". In 1959, there was only one box. A blank ballot paper counted as a vote "for" and one with the candidate's name crossed as "against". There were cubicles at the polls, but immense social pressure prevented virtually anyone from using them.

Some 1,200,000 votes were cast. Only 14 of them (about 0.001%) had been votes against the candidates. It was the last time that any voters voted against in North Korean elections until 2023.

== Results ==
Party or alliance		Votes	%	Seats
Fatherland Front	Workers' Party of Korea		100	55
Fatherland Front	Chondoist Chongu Party		100	1
Against		14	0.00	–
Total				56
Source: Tertitskiy 2017
