= 1997 in North Korea =

- Centuries: 20th; 21st
- Decades: 1970s; 1980s; 1990s; 2000s; 2010s
- See also: Other events of 1997; Years in North Korea; Timeline of Korean history 1997 in South Korea

Events from the year 1997 in North Korea.

== Incumbents ==
- Premier: Kang Song-san (until 21 February), Hong Song-nam (acting) (starting 21 February)
- Supreme Leader: Kim Jong-il

== Events ==
1994~1999:Arduous March

- April 1997: Five North Korean soldiers cross the Demilitarized Zone in Cheolwon, Gangwon-do, and fire on South Korean positions.
- June 1997: Three North Korean vessels cross the Northern Limit Line and attack South Korean vessels two miles (3 km) south of the line. On land, fourteen North Korean soldiers cross 70 m south of the center of the DMZ, leading to a 23-minute exchange of fire.
- 8 October – Kim Jong Il is elected as General Secretary of the Workers' Party of Korea.
- North Korean famine

== Deaths ==
- 21 February – Choe Kwang, 6th Minister of the People's Armed Forces and Marshal of the Korean People's Army (b. 1918).
- 27 February – Kim Kwang-jin, member of the National Defense Commission and Vice Marshal of the Korean People's Army (b. 1927).

== See also ==
- Years in Japan
- Years in South Korea
