= 1987 in North Korea =

- Centuries: 20th; 21st
- Decades: 1960s; 1970s; 1980s; 1990s; 2000s
- See also: Other events in 1987; Years in North Korea; Timeline of Korean history 1987 in South Korea

Events from the year 1987 in North Korea.

== Incumbents ==
- Premier: Li Gun-mo
- Supreme Leader: Kim Il Sung

== Events ==
- Mid 1987 – Construction begun on the Ryugyong Hotel. The hotel was an intention to be the world's tallest hotel, and was supposed to be opened in 1989 for the 1989 World Festival of Youth and Students
- 15 November – 1987 North Korean local elections
- 29 November – Bombing of Korean Air Flight 858

== Births ==
- 17 August - Ri Kwang-hyok.
- 24 August - Ri Jun-il.
- 24 September - Pak Song-chol.
- 10 October - Kim Kum-il.
