= 1976 in North Korea =

- Centuries: 20th; 21st
- Decades: 1950s; 1960s; 1970s; 1980s; 1990s
- See also: Other events in 1976; Years in North Korea; Timeline of Korean history 1976 in South Korea

Events from the year 1976 in North Korea.

== Incumbents ==
- Supreme Leader and President: Kim Il Sung
- Premier: Kim Il (until 19 April), Pak Song-chol (starting 19 April)
- Vice President: Choe Yong-gon (until 19 September, alongside Kang Ryang-uk, Kim Tong-gyu and Kim Il (starting 19 April))

== Events ==
- August 18 – Korean axe murder incident

== Births ==
- November 20 – Ji Yun-nam.

== Deaths ==
- March 7 – Nam Il, Vice Premier of North Korea (b. 1913).
- September 19 – Choe Yong-gon, 2nd Chairman of the Standing Committee of the Supreme People's Assembly (b. 1900).

== See also ==
- Years in Japan
- Years in South Korea
