= 1986 in North Korea =

- Centuries: 20th; 21st
- Decades: 1960s; 1970s; 1980s; 1990s; 2000s
- See also: Other events in 1986; Years in North Korea; Timeline of Korean history 1986 in South Korea

Events from the year 1986 in North Korea.

== Incumbents ==
- Premier: Kang Song-san (until 29 December), Li Gun-mo (starting 29 December)
- Supreme Leader: Kim Il Sung

== Events ==
1986 North Korean parliamentary election

== Births ==
- 5 April - Ri Song-chol.
- 9 September - Ri Myong-guk.
