= 1977 in North Korea =

- Centuries: 20th; 21st
- Decades: 1950s; 1960s; 1970s; 1980s; 1990s
- See also: Other events in 1977; Years in North Korea; Timeline of Korean history 1977 in South Korea

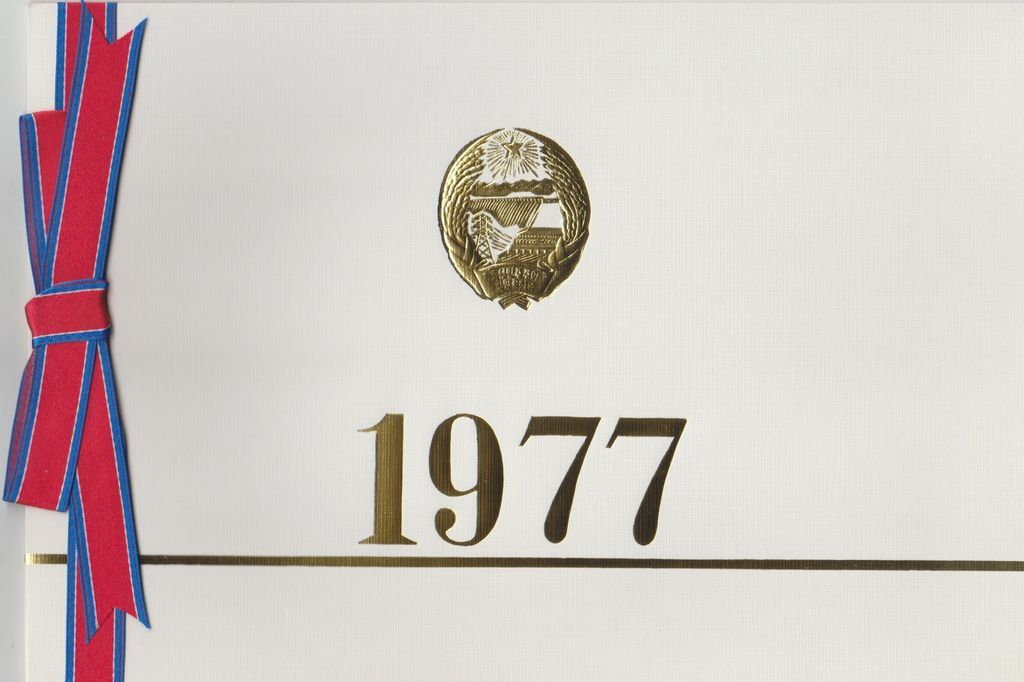
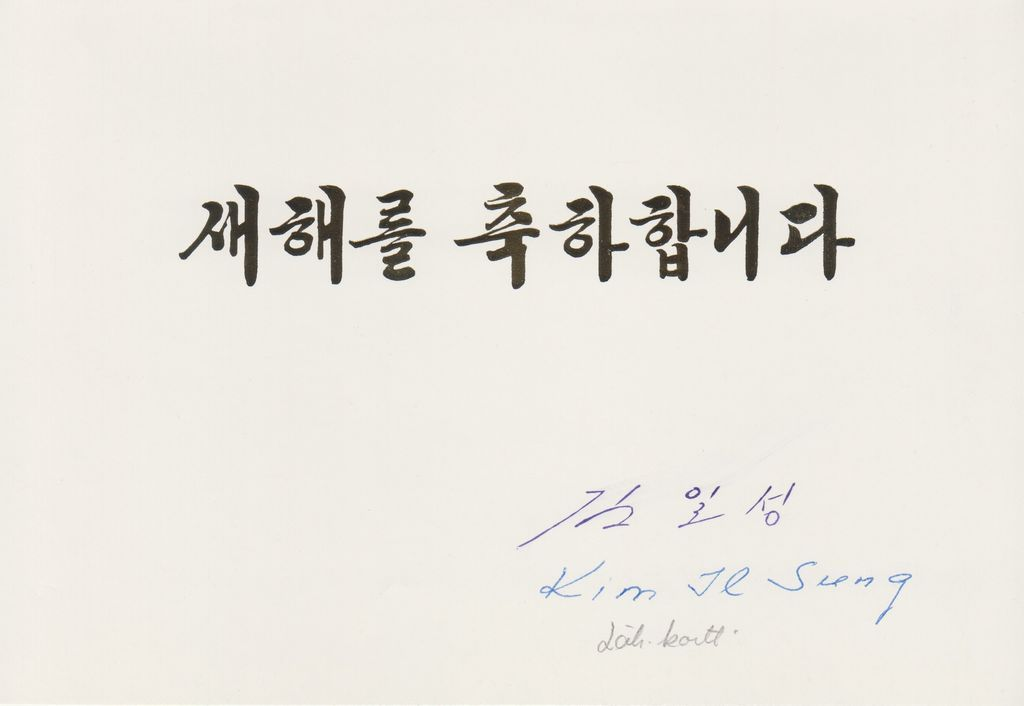
A Christmas card sent to Urho Kekkonen, the President of Finland, by Kim Il Sung

Events from the year 1977 in North Korea.

== Incumbents ==
- Premier: Pak Song-chol (until 19 December), Li Jong-ok (starting 19 December)
- Supreme Leader: Kim Il Sung
- President: Kim Il Sung
- Vice President: Kang Ryang-uk (alongside Kim Tong-gyu (until 16 December), Pak Song-chol (starting 16 December) and Kim Il)

== Events ==
1977 North Korean parliamentary election

== Births ==
- 1 January - Kim Jong-su.
- 2 September - O Song-suk.

== See also ==
- Years in Japan
- Years in South Korea
