= 1977 in South Korea =

- Centuries: 20th; 21st
- Decades: 1950s; 1960s; 1970s; 1980s; 1990s
- See also: Other events in 1977; Years in South Korea; Timeline of Korean history 1977 in North Korea

Events from the year 1977 in South Korea.

== Incumbents ==
- President: Park Chung-hee
- Prime Minister: Choi Kyu-hah

== Events ==
- June 25 – Hyundai Mobis was founded, as predecessor name was Hyundai Precision & Industries.
- August Unknown date – A first Hyundai Department Store open in Ulsan, as predecessor name was Ulsan Shopping Center.
- November 11 – Iri station explosion

== Births ==
- 27 February - Ji Sung, actor
- 15 March - Yoon Hye-Young, archer
- 31 May - Yoon Mi-rae, rapper, singer-songwriter and producer
- 25 July - Jo Hyeon-jeong, voice actress
- 19 August - Yang Joon-il, singer-songwriter, rapper, producer and author
- 9 September - Chae Jung-an, actress and singer
- 4 November - So Ji-sub, actor and rapper
- 31 December - Psy, singer-songwriter

== See also ==
- List of South Korean films of 1977
- Years in Japan
- Years in North Korea
