= 1984 in North Korea =

- Centuries: 20th; 21st
- Decades: 1960s; 1970s; 1980s; 1990s; 2000s
- See also: Other events in 1984; Years in North Korea; Timeline of Korean history 1984 in South Korea

Events from the year 1984 in North Korea.

== Incumbents ==
- Supreme Leader: Kim Il Sung
- President: Kim Il Sung
- Premier: Li Jong-ok (until 27 January)
  Kang Song-san (starting 27 January)
- Vice President: Yim Chun-chu (alongside Pak Song-chol, Kim Il (until 25 January)
  Ri Jong-ok (starting 27 January)

== Births ==
- 8 January – Kim Jong Un, Supreme Leader of North Korea (DPRK) since 2011 and leader of the Workers' Party of Korea since 2012. Son of the Eternal General Secretary Kim Jong Il and grandson of the Eternal President Kim Il Sung.
- 11 April – Kim Song-guk.
- 16 October – Kim Myong-gil.
- 2 December – Kim Hye-song.

== Deaths ==
- 9 March – Kim Il, 2nd Premier of North Korea (b. 1910).
- 6 April – O Paek-ryong, member of the 6th Politburo of the Workers' Party of Korea (b. 1913).
