= Kim Byung-hoon (entrepreneur) =

South Korean entrepreneur (born 1988)

- 김병훈
- Born: November 5, 1988 (age 37); Seoul, South Korea
- Education: Yonsei University
- Occupation: Businessman
- Known for: Founding APR Corp

Kim Byung-hoon (Korean: 김병훈; born November 5, 1988) is a South Korean entrepreneur. He is co-founder and chief executive officer of APR Corp, a beauty tech company. Forbes estimated his net worth at US$2.7 billion in April 2026, ranking him 21st among Korea’s Richest 50 list.

== Early life and education ==
Kim was born in Seoul. In 2007, he entered Yonsei University to study business administration. During an exchange program in California, he began developing mobile applications, discovering a talent for identifying digital consumer behaviour long before it became mainstream.

== Career ==
In 2014, Kim founded APR Corp. Its flagship brand, Medicube, was launched in 2016 and gained initial traction through its skincare line. The subsequent roll-out of at-home beauty devices under the brand in 2021 further accelerated the company’s growth, becoming a primary driver of its market expansion.

In 2024, APR went public. Kim’s stake in the company made him a billionaire.

In its annual 'Top 100 Beauty Companies' ranking, the fashion trade journal WWD identified APR the fastest-growing major beauty company of 2025.

The company has become Asia’s most valuable beauty company by market capitalization in 2026, surpassing regional rivals including Amorepacific, LG H&H, Shiseido and Proya Cosmetics.

In April 2026, APR was named to the TIME100 Most Influential Companies list, making headlines as the first Korean beauty brand to ever be included.

== Personal life ==
In 2025, Kim purchased an apartment in Seongsu-dong, Seoul, for ₩29 billion.
