= 1990 in North Korea =

- Centuries: 20th; 21st
- Decades: 1970s; 1980s; 1990s; 2000s; 2010s
- See also: Other events in 1990; Years in North Korea; Timeline of Korean history 1990 in South Korea

Events from the year 1990 in North Korea.

== Incumbents ==
- Premier: Yon Hyong-muk
- Supreme Leader: Kim Il Sung

== Events ==
1990 North Korean parliamentary election

== Births ==
- 4 February - Park Jin Hyok, programmer and hacker
- 20 May - Ju Kwang-min, footballer
- 8 June - Sol Kyong, judoka
- 2 December - An Il-bom, footballer
