= 1949 North Korean local elections =

Three local elections were held in North Korea in 1949.

Provincial, city, county and district people's assembly elections were held on March 30, with 689 provincial people's assembly deputies and 5,164 city and county people's assembly deputies elected. Township people's assembly elections were held on November 24–25, with 13,354 deputies elected. Town, neighborhood, village, and workers' district people's assembly elections were held on December 2, with 56,112 deputies elected.

Voter turnout was reported as 100%, with candidates receiving a 100% approval rate.
