= 1959 North Korean local elections =

Elections to city, county, district, town, neighborhood, village and workers' district people's assemblies were held in North Korea on November 28, 1959.

In the elections, 9,759 city, county and district people's assembly deputies and 53,882 town, neighborhood, village and workers' district people's assembly deputies were elected. Voter turnout was reported as 100%, with candidates receiving a 100% approval rate.
