= 2001 in North Korea =

- Centuries: 20th; 21st
- Decades: 1980s; 1990s; 2000s; 2010s; 2020s
- See also: Other events of 2001; Years in North Korea; Timeline of Korean history 2001 in South Korea

Events from the year 2001 in North Korea.

== Incumbents ==
- Premier: Hong Song-nam
- Supreme Leader: Kim Jong-il

== Politics ==
- Establishment of diplomatic relations with the Netherlands.
