= Thor Bjarne Bore =

Norwegian newspaper editor and politician (1938–2019)

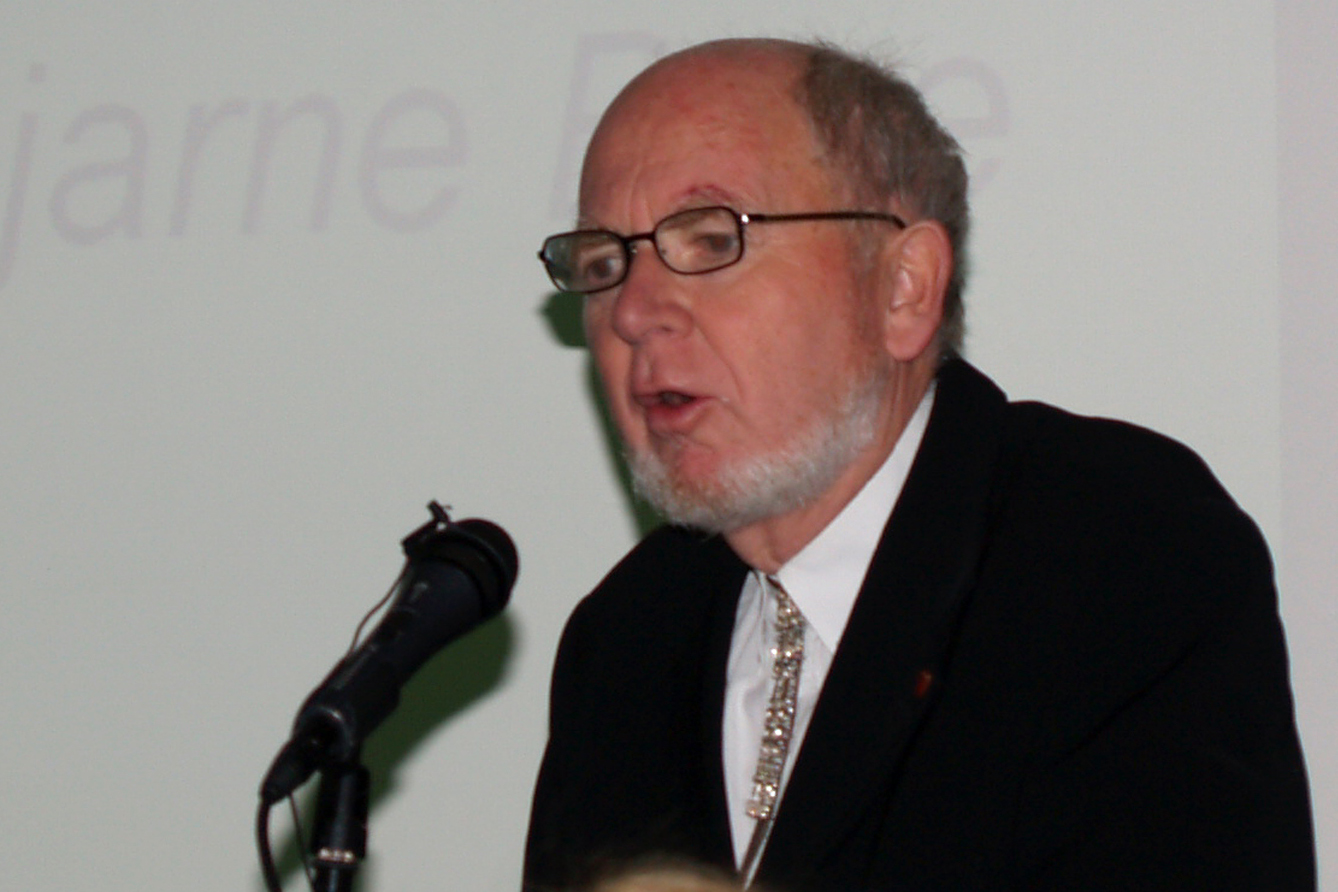

Chair of Norwegian Church Aid
- In office 2000 – 22 December 2019

Member of Stavanger Municipal council
- In office 2007–2011

Personal details
- Born: 10 January 1938 Molde, Norway
- Died: 22 December 2019 (aged 81)
- Party: Liberal
- Education: University of Oslo (cand.mag.)

Thor Bjarne Bore (10 January 1938 – 22 December 2019) was a Norwegian newspaper editor and politician.

He was born in Molde, and educated at the University of Oslo, graduating with the cand.mag. degree in 1961. He was the editor-in-chief of Romsdals Budstikke from 1966 to 1970, Vårt Land from 1974 to 1983 and Stavanger Aftenblad from 1983 to 1999. He also worked in Vårt Land from 1964 to 1966 and 1970 to 1974.

Bore was the chair of Norwegian Church Aid since 2000. He was also a member of the municipal council for Stavanger Municipality for the Liberal Party from 2007 to 2011. He died in 2019, aged 81.
