= 1994 in North Korea =

- Centuries: 20th; 21st
- Decades: 1970s; 1980s; 1990s; 2000s; 2010s
- See also: Other events of 1994; Years in North Korea; Timeline of Korean history 1994 in South Korea

Events from the year 1994 in North Korea.

== Incumbents ==
- Premier: Kang Song-san
- Supreme Leader: Kim Il Sung (until 8 July), Kim Jong Il (starting 8 July)

== Events ==
- January - October 1994: 1994 North Korean nuclear crisis;
- July 1994: Death and state funeral of Kim Il Sung;
- October 1994: Signing of the Agreed Framework between North Korea and the United States;
- December 1994: North Koreans shoot down US Army helicopter. One US KIA and one US POW for 13 days;
- North Korean famine

== Deaths ==
- July 5 – Ju To-il, member of the Central Military Commission of the Workers' Party of Korea (b. 1922).
- July 8 – Kim Il Sung, 1st Supreme Leader of North Korea (b. 1912).
