= 1974 in South Korea =

- Centuries: 20th; 21st
- Decades: 1950s; 1960s; 1970s; 1980s; 1990s
- See also: Other events in 1974; Years in South Korea; Timeline of Korean history 1974 in North Korea

Events from the year 1974 in South Korea.

== Incumbents ==
- President: Park Chung-hee
- Prime Minister: Kim Jong-pil

== Events ==
- November 3 – A massibie caught fire in Daewang Corner(대왕코너,大旺코너) complex building, Dongdaemun-gu, Seoul, 88 people died, 35 people were hurt, according to Seoul Fire Department official confirmed report.

== Births ==
- January 3 - Shin Eun-jung, actress
- March 4 - Kim Jung-eun, actress
- June 3 - Seo Jang-hoon, basketball player turned comedian/TV personality
- June 23 - Kim Young-chul (comedian)
- July 5 - Kim Byung-chul, actor
- December 7 - Kang Full
- Byung Chul Kim, artist

== Deaths ==
- April 28 - Yu Chin-san, politician
- August 15 - Yuk Young-soo, wife of Park Chung-hee
- December 20 - Mun Segwang

== See also ==
- List of South Korean films of 1974
