= 1977 North Korean local elections =

Elections to provincial, municipal, city, county and district people's assemblies were held in North Korea on March 4, 1977. In total, 3,244 provincial people's assembly deputies and 24,268 city, county and district people's assembly deputies were elected.

Voter turnout was reported as 100%, with candidates receiving a 100% approval rate.
