= 1972 in North Korea =

- Centuries: 20th; 21st
- Decades: 1950s; 1960s; 1970s; 1980s; 1990s
- See also: Other events in 1972; Years in North Korea; Timeline of Korean history 1972 in South Korea

Events from the year 1972 in North Korea.

== Incumbents ==
- Premier: Kim Il Sung (until 28 December) Kim Il (starting 28 December)
- Supreme Leader: Kim Il Sung
- President: Kim Il Sung (starting 28 December)
- Vice President: Choe Yong-gon (starting 28 December, alongside Kang Ryang-uk)

== Events ==
- July 4th North–South Korea Joint Statement
- 1972 North Korean parliamentary election

== Births ==
- March 4 - Pae Gil-su.

== See also ==
- Years in Japan
- Years in South Korea
