= 1996 in North Korea =

- Centuries: 20th; 21st
- Decades: 1970s; 1980s; 1990s; 2000s; 2010s
- See also: Other events of 1996; Years in North Korea; Timeline of Korean history 1996 in South Korea

Events from the year 1996 in North Korea.

== Incumbents ==
- Premier: Kang Song-san
- Supreme Leader: Kim Jong-il

== Events ==
1994~1999:Arduous March

- April 1996: Several hundred armed North Korean troops cross repeatedly into the Demilitarized Zone.
- May 1996: Seven Northern soldiers cross south of the Demilitarized Zone, but withdraw after warning shots are fired.
- May & June 1996: North Korean vessels twice cross the Northern Limit Line and have a several-hour standoff with the South Korean navy.

Defection of Lee Han-young, a nephew of one of the former wives of Kim Jong Il announced.
