= 1979 in South Korea =

- Centuries: 20th; 21st
- Decades: 1950s; 1960s; 1970s; 1980s; 1990s
- See also: Other events in 1979; Years in South Korea; Timeline of Korean history 1979 in North Korea

Events from the year 1979 in South Korea.

== Incumbents ==
- President: Park Chung Hee (until 26 October), Choi Kyu-hah (starting 6 December)
- Prime Minister: Choi Kyu-hah (until 6 December), Shin Hyun-hwak (starting 12 December)

== Events ==
- October 3 - Security chief Kim Jae-kyu meets democrat politician Kim Young-sam to discuss the country's future.
- December 6 - 1979 South Korean presidential election, confirms former prime minister Choi Kyu-hah as the new president.
- December 12 - Coup d'état of December Twelfth: Lieutenant General Chun Doo-hwan, commander of the Security Command, orders the arrest of General Jeong Seung-hwa, ROK Army Chief of Staff, on allegations of involvement in the assassination of President Park Chung Hee. A shoot-out at the Army Headquarters and the Ministry of Defense results in Chun and his fellow eleventh class military academy graduates such as Major General Roh Tae-woo and Major General Jeong Ho-yong taking control of the Korean military.

== Films ==
- The Genealogy
- Police Story
- The Rain at Night
- Water Lady

== Births ==
- 3 January - Kim E-Z, singer
- 10 January - Lee Hyori, singer
- 7 January - Ha Jae-sook, actress
- 12 January - Lee Bo-young, actress
- 20 January - Choo Ja-hyun, actress
- 21 January - Byung-hyun Kim, baseball player
- 30 January - Nam Hyun-joon, dancer
- 8 February - MC Sniper, musical artist
- 16 February - Eric Mun, rapper
- 21 February - Lee Hee-jin, singer and actress
- 11 March - Jung Yong-hoon, footballer
- 29 March - Park Si-yeon, actress
- 6 April - H-Eugene, rapper
- 10 July - Gong Yoo, actor
- 13 July - Lee Jai-jin, musician
- 28 July - Lee Min-woo, singer
- 7 August - Kim Jae-duck, singer
- 4 September - MC Mong, rapper
- 10 September - MayBee, singer
- 24 September - Kim Jong-min, singer
- 10 October - Kangta, singer
- 2 November - Skull, singer
- 21 November - Kim Dong-wan, singer and actor
- 27 November - Shin Hye-sung, singer-songwriter
- 28 November - Daniel Henney, actor

== Deaths ==
- October 26 - President Park Chung Hee, 61 (assassinated)

== See also ==
- List of South Korean films of 1979
