= 1992 in North Korea =

- Centuries: 20th; 21st
- Decades: 1970s; 1980s; 1990s; 2000s; 2010s
- See also: Other events of 1992; Years in North Korea; Timeline of Korean history 1992 in South Korea

Events from the year 1992 in North Korea.

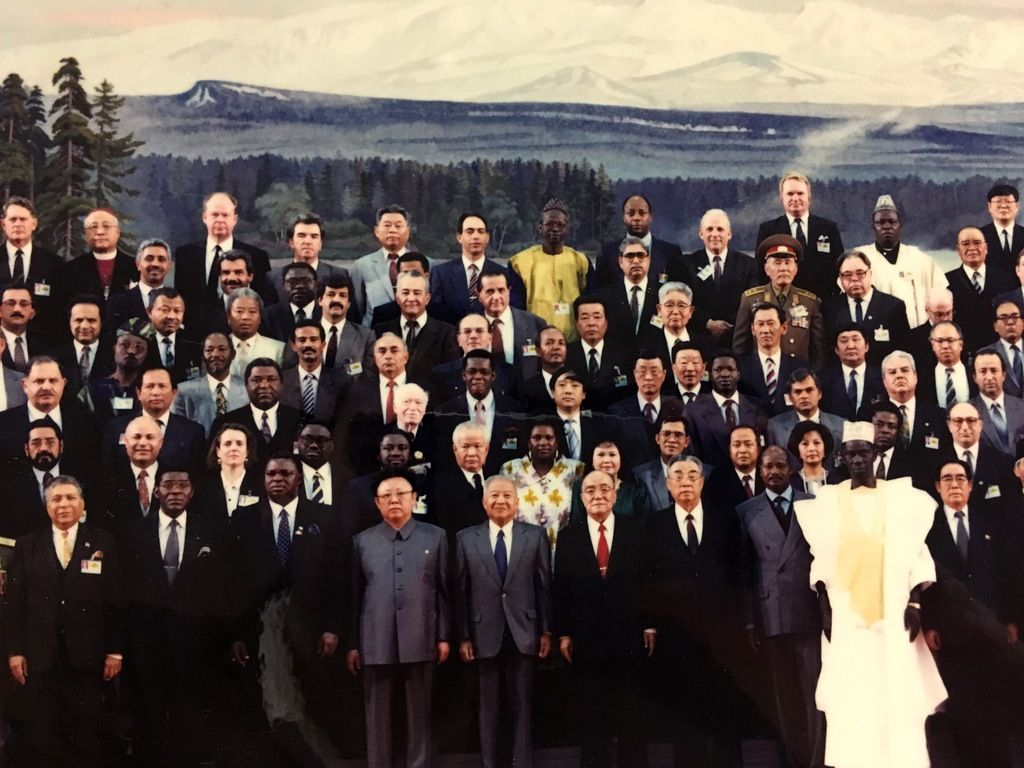
80th birthday of Kim Il-sung in 1992

== Incumbents ==
- Premier: Yon Hyong-muk (until 12 December), Kang Song-san (starting 12 December)
- Supreme Leader: Kim Il Sung

== Events ==
- Some North Korean students in Moscow attempted a failed coup d'état.
- 15 April – 80th Birthday of Kim Il-sung celebrations

== Births ==
- 17 April - So Hyon-uk.
- 12 November - Om Chol-song.
