= 1974 in North Korea =

- Centuries: 20th; 21st
- Decades: 1950s; 1960s; 1970s; 1980s; 1990s
- See also: Other events in 1974; Years in North Korea; Timeline of Korean history 1974 in South Korea

Events from the year 1974 in North Korea.

== Incumbents ==
- Premier: Kim Il
- Supreme Leader: Kim Il Sung
- President: Kim Il Sung
- Vice President: Choe Yong-gon (alongside Kang Ryang-uk and Kim Tong-gyu (starting November))

== Births ==
- 24 July - Ham Pong-sil.

== See also ==
- Years in Japan
- Years in South Korea
