= 1976 in South Korea =

- Centuries: 20th; 21st
- Decades: 1950s; 1960s; 1970s; 1980s; 1990s
- See also: Other events in 1976; Years in South Korea; Timeline of Korean history 1976 in North Korea

Events from the year 1976 in South Korea.

== Incumbents ==
- President: Park Chung-hee
- Prime Minister: Choi Kyu-hah

== Events ==
- April 17 – Everland, as well known for theme park in nation's, officially was open in Gyeongi-do
- August 18 – Korean axe murder incident

== Births ==
- March 25 - Baek Ji-young
- April 14 - Oh Ji-ho
- October 5 - Song Seung-heon
- December 20 - Jang Hyuk

== Establishments ==
- Dongkang College.
- Meongdong Declaration.

== See also ==
- List of South Korean films of 1976
- Years in Japan
- Years in North Korea
