= 1967 North Korean local elections =

Elections to provincial, city, county, district, town, neighborhood, village and workers' district people's assemblies (도·시·군·구역·리(동)·읍·로동자구 인민회의 대의원 선거 were held in North Korea on November 30, 1967. In the elections, 3,305 provincial people's assembly deputies, 18,673 city, county and district people's assembly deputies, and 84,541 town, neighborhood, villages and workers' district people's assembly deputies were elected.

Voter turnout was reported as 100%, with candidates receiving a 100% approval rate.
