= 2000 in North Korea =

- Centuries: 20th; 21st
- Decades: 1980s; 1990s; 2000s; 2010s; 2020s
- See also: Other events of 2000; Years in North Korea; Timeline of Korean history 2000 in South Korea

The following lists events that happened during 2000 in North Korea.

== Incumbents ==
- Supreme Leader: Kim Jong-il
- Premier: Hong Song-nam

== Events ==
- May 29 to May 31: Supreme Leader Kim Jong Il makes a state visit to China after 17 years since 1983.
- June 13 to June 15: 2000 inter-Korean summit in Pyongyang
- June 15: June 15th North–South Joint Declaration
- July 19 to July 20: Russian President Vladimir Putin became the first Russian Leader to visit North Korea. The state visit by Vladimir Putin restored North Korea–Russia relations which had been strained since 1990.

August: Typhoon Prapiroon

September: Typhoon Saomai

== Deaths ==
- 10 May – Kim Yong Il, diplomat and youngest son of 1st Supreme Leader Kim Il Sung (b. 1955).
- 25 June – Kang Song-san, 5th Premier of North Korea (b. 1931).
- 8 August – Kim Tal-hyon, politician (b. 1941).

== See also ==
- Years in South Korea
