= 1995 in North Korea =

- Centuries: 20th; 21st
- Decades: 1970s; 1980s; 1990s; 2000s; 2010s
- See also: Other events of 1995; Years in North Korea; Timeline of Korean history 1995 in South Korea

Events from the year 1995 in North Korea.

== Incumbents ==
- Premier: Kang Song-san
- Supreme Leader: Kim Jong-il

== Events ==
1994~1999:Arduous March

- April 28–29, 1995:Pyongyang International Sports and Culture Festival for Peace(Aired in august 4)
- May 1995: North Korean forces fire on a South Korean fishing boat, killing three.
- October 1995: Two armed North Koreans are discovered at the Imjin River; one is killed.

== Deaths ==
- 25 February – O Jin-u, First Vice Chairman of the National Defense Commission and Marshal of the Korean People's Army (b. 1917).
- 19 July – Kim Pong-ryul, Vice Minister of the People's Armed Forces (b. 1918).
