= 1972 in South Korea =

- Centuries: 20th; 21st
- Decades: 1950s; 1960s; 1970s; 1980s; 1990s
- See also: Other events in 1972; Years in South Korea; Timeline of Korean history 1972 in North Korea

Events from the year 1972 in South Korea.

== Incumbents ==
- President: Park Chung-hee
- Prime Minister: Kim Jong-pil

== Events ==
- December 2 – According to Seoul Fire Department official confirmed report, a massibie caught fire in Seoul Citizen Hall (now Sejong Center), Jongno-gu, Seoul, 51 persons were human fatalities, 76 persons were wounded.

== Births ==
- January 1 – Yoon Chan, actor
- January 5 – Jang Seo-hee, actress
- January 15
  - Il Mi Chung, golfer
  - Yang Yong-eun, golfer
- March 7 – Jang Dong-gun, actor
- June 16 – John Cho, actor
- July 28 – Yum Jung-ah, actress
- August 29 – Bae Yong-joon, actor and businessman
- September 6 - Oh Yong-ran, handball player
- October 6 – Ko So-young, actress and model
- October 8 – Kim Myung-min, actor
- December 13 - J. Y. Park, singer-songwriter, record producer, record executive and reality television show judge

== See also ==
- List of South Korean films of 1972
- Years in Japan
- Years in North Korea
