= 1973 in North Korea =

- Centuries: 20th; 21st
- Decades: 1950s; 1960s; 1970s; 1980s; 1990s
- See also: Other events in 1973; Years in North Korea; Timeline of Korean history 1973 in South Korea

Events from the year 1973 in North Korea.

== Incumbents ==
- Premier: Kim Il
- Supreme Leader: Kim Il Sung
- President: Kim Il Sung
- Vice President: Choe Yong-gon (alongside Kang Ryang-uk)

== Events ==
- North Korea disputed the Northern Limit Line.

== See also ==
- Years in Japan
- Years in South Korea
