= Proya Cosmetics =

Chinese company

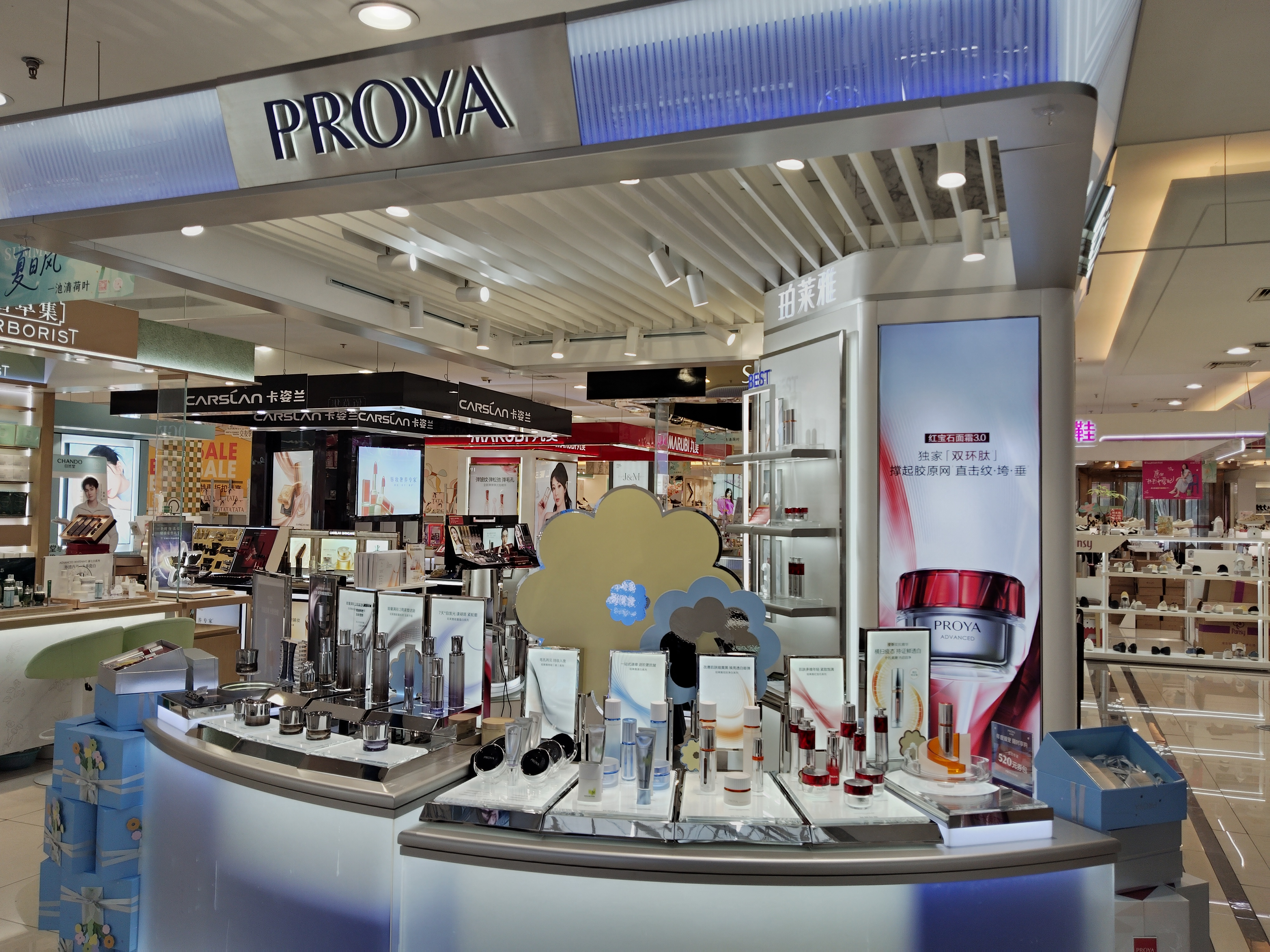
A Proya store in a Suzhou mall

Proya Cosmetics (Chinese: 珀莱雅) is a Chinese cosmetics company based in Hangzhou.

In 2006, Hou Juncheng founded Proya Cosmetics in Zhejiang Province. Proya is headquartered in Hangzhou and employs 2,720 people.

Proya was listed on the Shanghai Stock Exchange in November 2017. In the first three quarters of 2019, Proya's revenue was 2.1 billion yuan and profit was 240 million yuan, both up nearly one-third, year on year.

The company also owns and manages several hospitality brands. Tieding Liuliu Fairyland is an amusement park in Yueqing. French restaurant Ambré Ciel received one Michelin star since 2023, Zhejiang-cuisine restaurant Definitely Fresh received Bib Gourmand Award in 2024.
