= Shin Eui-kyung =

South Korean activist (1898–1988)

Member of the Interim Legislative Assembly
- In office 1946–1948

Personal details
- Born: 23 March 1898; Seoul, Korean Empire
- Died: 1988

Shin Eui-kyung (Korean: 신의경, 23 March 1898 – 1988) was a South Korean educator, independence activist and politician. In 1946 she was one of the four women who were appointed to the Interim Legislative Assembly, becoming South Korea's first female legislators.

== Biography ==
Shin was born in Seoul in 1898, the daughter of Shin Jung-woo and Maria Shin. In 1919 she founded the Korean Patriotic Women's Association with Maria Kim. She was arrested by Japanese police later in the year and sentenced to two years in prison. In 1922 she was one of the founders of the Korean branch of the YCWA.

After graduating from Ewha Womaen's College in 1924 with a degree in English literature, she studied history at Tohoku University in Japan, where she was the only female student. While there, she met her future husband Park Dong-gil. When she returned to Korea, she taught history at Ewha Women's College. She married Park in 1931.

Following the end of World War II, the United States Army Military Government established an Interim Legislative Assembly with 90 members; 45 elected and 45 appointed by Military Governor John R. Hodge. Although women were unable to vote in the election, Hodge appointed four women, including Shin. In 1947 she was amongst the founders of the Korean Red Cross. After the Interim Legislative Assembly was dissolved in 1948, she returned to education.
