= 1978 in South Korea =

- Centuries: 20th; 21st
- Decades: 1950s; 1960s; 1970s; 1980s; 1990s
- See also: Other events in 1978; Years in South Korea; Timeline of Korean history 1978 in North Korea

Events from the year 1978 in South Korea.

== Incumbents ==
- President: Park Chung-hee
- Prime Minister: Choi Kyu-hah

== Events ==
- April 20 – Korean Air Lines Flight 902 is shot down by Soviet Interceptor fighter jets near Murmansk after entering Soviet airspace during a flight en route from Paris to Seoul via Anchorage.
- July 6 – 1978 South Korean presidential election
- December 12 – 1978 South Korean legislative election

== Births ==
- 3 February - Chae Ri-na, singer
- 7 February - Jeong Hyeong-don, comedian and television host
- 24 February - Gary, rapper, songwriter, record producer, entrepreneur, and television personality
- 3 March - Seomoon Tak, rock singer
- 14 March - Moon Hee-joon, singer-songwriter
- 5 April - Sohyang, singer
- 6 April - Chun Myung-hoon, singer, rapper, actor and television presenter
- 8 May - Jang Woo-hyuk, singer and rapper
- 2 June - Yi So-yeon, astronaut and biotechnologist
- 7 June - Tony An, singer
- 8 June - Eun Ji-won, rapper and singer
- 1 July - Woo Sun-hee, handball player
- 25 August - Jo Jung-chi, singer-songwriter
- 9 December - Ki Tae-young, actor
- 10 December - Chae Yeon, singer
- 20 December - Yoon Gye-sang, actor and singer

== See also ==
- List of South Korean films of 1978
- Years in Japan
- Years in North Korea
