= 1978 in North Korea =

- Centuries: 20th; 21st
- Decades: 1950s; 1960s; 1970s; 1980s; 1990s
- See also: Other events in 1978; Years in North Korea; Timeline of Korean history 1978 in South Korea

Events from the year 1978 in North Korea.

== Incumbents ==
- Premier: Li Jong-ok
- Supreme Leader: Kim Il Sung
- President: Kim Il Sung
- Vice President: Kang Ryang-uk (alongside Pak Song-chol and Kim Il)

== Events ==
=== Date unknown ===
- The North Korean government kidnaps Romanian painter Doina Bumbea.

== Births ==
- 23 January – Sin Yong-nam.
- 9 August – Han Jong-in.
- 16 August – Ri Kum-suk.
- 29 September – Mun In-guk.

== See also ==
- Years in Japan
- Years in South Korea
