= 1989 in South Korea =

- Centuries: 20th; 21st
- Decades: 1960s; 1970s; 1980s; 1990s; 2000s
- See also: Other events in 1989; Years in South Korea; Timeline of Korean history 1989 in North Korea

Events from the year 1989 in South Korea.

== Incumbents ==
- President: Roh Tae-woo
- Prime Minister: Kang Young-hoon

== Events ==
July 12: Lotte World, a major recreation complex in Seoul, South Korea, is opened to the public. It consists of the world's largest indoor amusement park.

July 27: Korean Air Flight 803

October 26: 10th anniversary of the assassination of Park Chung-hee.

== Births ==
- January 1 - Bae Geu-rin, actress
- January 8 - Lee Yi-kyung, actor
- January 30
  - Baek Sung-hyun, actor
  - Lee Gun-woo, singer
- February 21 - Hong Yoo-jin, field hockey player
- March 9 - Taeyeon, singer (Girls' Generation)
- March 29 - Michelle Zauner, musician (Little Big League) (Japanese Breakfast)
- April 28 - Kim Sung-kyu, singer and actor
- May 31 - Daul Kim, model, painter and blogger (d. 2009)
- July 28 - Amy Yang, golfer
- September 16 - Hwang Seon-a, fencer
- September 22 - Hyoyeon, singer (Girls' Generation)
- November 22 - Gwon Han-na, handball player
- December 5 - Yuri, singer (Girls' Generation)
- December 11 - Hyolyn, singer-songwriter
- December 13 - Chang Ye-na, badminton player
- December 14 - Onew, singer and actor (SHINee)
- December 27 - Kim Ha-na, badminton player
- December 30 - Yoon Bo-ra, singer, rapper and actress

== Deaths ==
- February 27 - Kim Hyun-chul, politician
- April 21 - Princess Deokhye, former Princess of the Korean Empire (b. 1912)
- November 14 - Choe Deok-sin, foreign minister and defector (b. 1914)

== See also ==
- List of South Korean films of 1989
- Years in Japan
- Years in North Korea
