= 1980 in South Korea =

- Centuries: 20th; 21st
- Decades: 1960s; 1970s; 1980s; 1990s; 2000s
- See also: Other events in 1980; Years in South Korea; Timeline of Korean history 1980 in North Korea

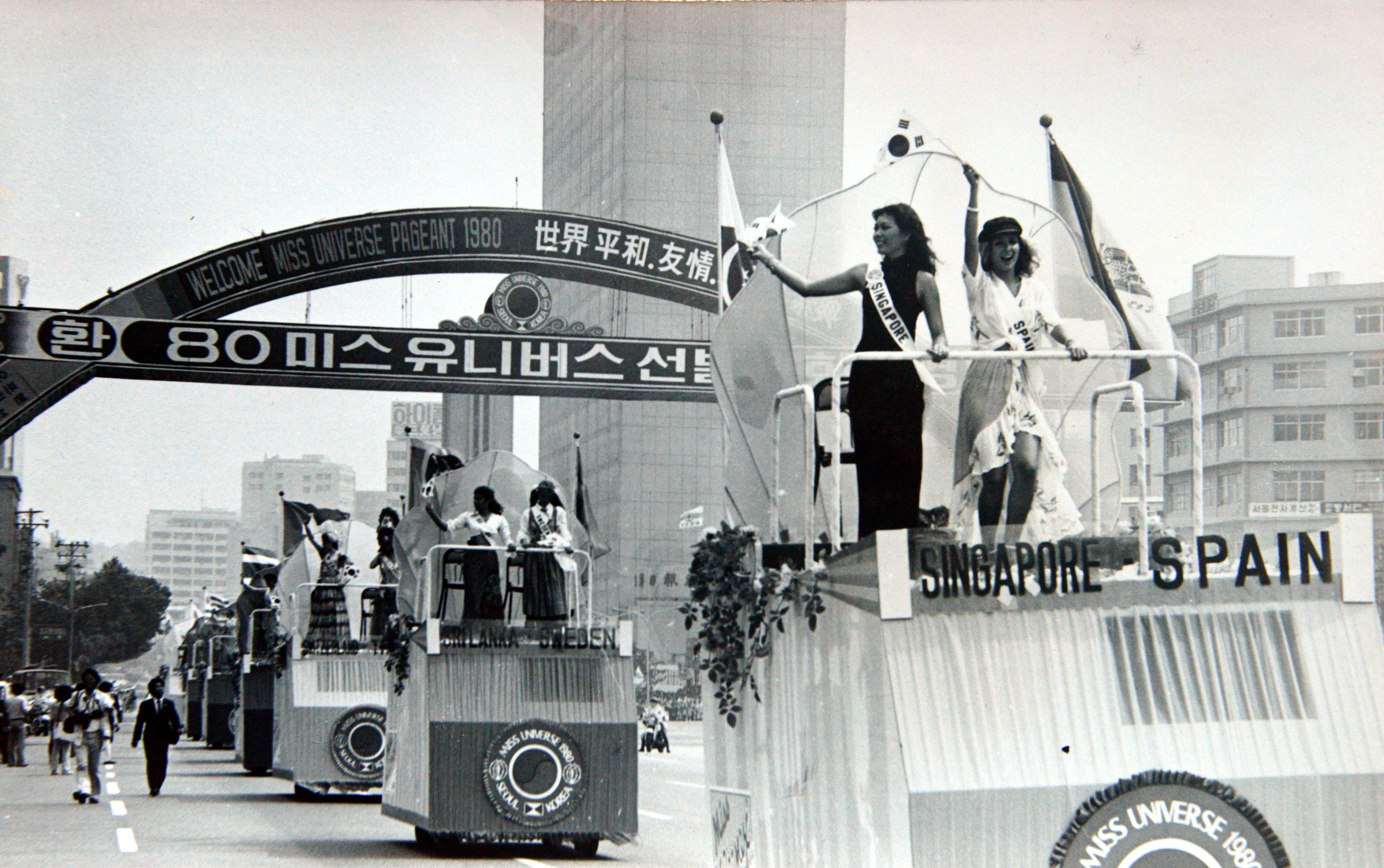
Miss Universe Parade (Gwanghwamun, June 29, 1980)

Events from the year 1980 in South Korea.

== Incumbents ==
- President: Choi Kyu-hah (until 16 August), Chun Doo-hwan (starting 1 September)
- Prime Minister:
  - until 22 May: Shin Hyun-hwak
  - 22 May-2 September: Pak Choong-hoon
  - starting 2 September: Nam Duck-woo

== Events ==
- May 17 - Coup d'état of May Seventeenth: General Chun Doo-hwan forces the Cabinet to extend martial law to the whole nation.
- May 18–27 - Gwangju massacre: Up to 165 people are killed when a popular uprising in the city of Gwangju is crushed by the South Korean army.
- May 20 - Chun Doo-hwan and Roh Tae-woo order the National Assembly of Korea to be dissolved, using troops to enforce the order.
- July 8- Miss Universe 1980
- August 27 - Chun Doo-hwan is elected President of South Korea by the "National Conference for Unification".

== Films ==
- Fine Windy Day
- The Hidden Hero
- Neumi
- Painful Maturity
- Son of Man
- The Last Witness
- A Taxi Driver

== Births ==
- 15 January - Sam Oh, TV host and radio DJ based in the Philippines
- 13 February - Lee Sang-woo, actor
- 22 February - Kang Sung-hoon, singer
- 28 February - Bada, singer-songwriter, actress and TV host
- 4 March - Jeong Da-bin, actress (d. 2007)
- 13 March - Kim Nam-gil, actor, film producer, director, singer
- 20 March - Ock Joo-hyun, singer and actress
- 21 March - Lee Jin, singer and actress
- 29 March - Kim Tae-hee, actress
- 4 April - Gong Hyo-jin, actress
- 5 April - Lee Jae-won, DJ and singer
- 9 April - Lee Yo-won, actress
- 4 May
  - Park Jong-Jin, footballer
  - Jang Geum-young, sport shooter
- 7 May - Kim Nam-soon, archer
- 8 July - Yang Tae-Young, gymnast
- 19 August - Jun Jin, singer and actor
- 16 November - Lee Eun-ju, actress
- 7 December - Choi Jung-in, singer
- 19 December - Verbal Jint, musician, rapper and record producer
- 21 December - Jung Ryeo-won, actress
- 26 December - Jo Jung-seok, actor

== Deaths ==
- May 24 - Kim Jae-gyu, South Korean Army Lieutenant General, director of the Korean Central Intelligence Agency, and assassin of President Park Chung-hee (born 1926; executed by hanging)

== See also ==
- List of South Korean films of 1980
