= Yeon Woo (singer, born 1981) =

South Korean singer

- Hangul: 연우
- RR: Yeon U
- MR: Yŏn U

Former name
- Hangul: 유진
- RR: Yu Jin
- MR: Yu Chin

Yeon Woo is a South Korean pop singer signed to MBC. In 1999, she and four other Korean singers formed girl group T.T.MA, in which she used the stage name Yu Jin. After their 2002 breakup, which she later stated that she regretted, she temporarily left the music industry. In 2007, she made a comeback with a new image and released a solo album Dan Harureul Salado; the digital version ranked #1 for number of registered downloads in June of that year. In August, she then released the album Season in the Sun, a remake of a Japanese album. In April 2008, she released her first album: "Yeon Woo 1st".

== Discography ==
단 하루를 살아도 (Dan Harureul Salado; digital single, released 2007-05-21)

1. 단 하루를 살아도 (RR: "Dan Harureul Salado"; Eng.: "Even if I only live one day")
2. 나도 여자인가 봐 (RR: "Nado Yeojainga Bwa"; Eng.: "See that I'm also a woman")
3. 단 하루를 살아도 (RR: "Dan Harureul Salado"; instrumental)
4. 나도 여자인가 봐 (RR: "Nado Yeojainga Bwa"; instrumental)

Season in the Sun (released 2007-08-27)

1. Season In The Sun
2. Season In The Sun (Club Mix)
3. Season In The Sun (Instrumental)
4. Season In The Sun (Club Mix, instrumental)

Yeon Woo 1st (released 2008-04-17)

1. The Bridges Of Madison County
2. 사랑은 시간 속에 남아
3. Darling
4. Season In The Sun (J-pop Version)
5. 그대만 (Featuring 소이)
6. No Life Without You (Featuring 소설)
7. 단 하루를 살아도
8. In Memory
9. 사랑은 시간 속에 남아 (Instrumental)
10. Darling (Instrumental)
11. I Wish A Merry Christmas! (From. 소이)
12. 메리메리 - T.T.Ma (티티마)
