= 1982 in North Korea =

- Centuries: 20th; 21st
- Decades: 1960s; 1970s; 1980s; 1990s; 2000s
- See also: Other events in 1982; Years in North Korea; Timeline of Korean history 1982 in South Korea

Events from the year 1982 in North Korea.

== Incumbents ==
- Premier: Li Jong-ok
- Supreme Leader: Kim Il Sung
- President: Kim Il Sung
- Vice President: Kang Ryang-uk (alongside Pak Song-chol and Kim Il)

== Events ==
1982 North Korean parliamentary election

== Births ==
- 7 May - Nam Song-chol
- 12 September - Kim Chol-su
