= 1988 in North Korea =

- Centuries: 20th; 21st
- Decades: 1960s; 1970s; 1980s; 1990s; 2000s
- See also: Other events in 1988; Years in North Korea; Timeline of Korean history 1988 in South Korea

Events from the year 1988 in North Korea.

== Incumbents ==
- Premier: Li Gun-mo (until 12 December), Yon Hyong-muk (starting 12 December)
- Supreme Leader: Kim Il Sung

== Events ==
North Korea at the 1988 Winter Olympics

== Births ==
- 3 October - Pak Nam-chol
- 10 December - Pak Chol-min
