= 1950 North Korean local elections in South Korea =

Local elections were held in areas of South Korea occupied by North Korea during the Korean War from 25 July until 13 September 1950. Elections for county, township and village (neighborhood) people's committees were held in 103 counties, 1,186 townships and 13,654 villages or neighborhoods in the South Korean provinces of Hwanghae, Gyeonggi, Gangwon, North Chungcheong, South Chungcheong, North Jeolla, South Jeolla, North Gyeongsang and South Gyeongsang.

The elections were announced through the Decree "On Implementing the Election of People's Committees in Counties, Townships and Villages (Neighborhoods) in the Liberated Areas in the South (해방된 남반부지역에서 군, 면, 리[동] 인민위원회선거를 실시할데 대하여)" issued by the Standing Committee of the Supreme People's Assembly on 14 July 1950. The same decree organized a Central Election Guidance Committee consisting of Kim Won-bong, Jang Sun-myong, Kim Ung-gi, Ri Jong-gap, Hyon Hun, Jong Chil-song, Nam Song-min and Pang Hak-se.

In the elections, 3,878 county people's committee members, 22,314 township people's committee members and 77,716 village people's committee members were elected.
