= Yoo Chang-soon =

Prime Minister of South Korea in 1982

- 유창순
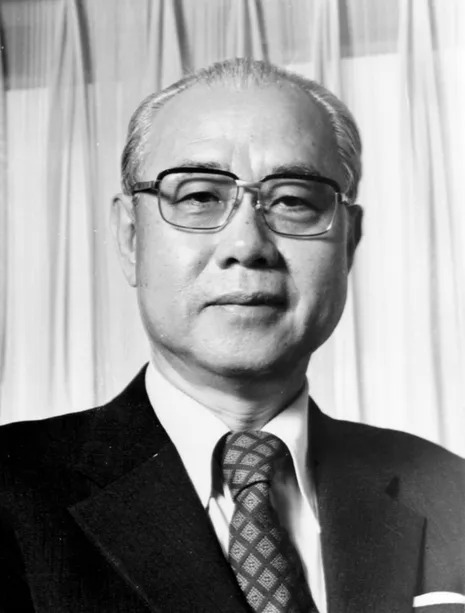

15th Prime Minister of South Korea
- In office 4 January 1982 – 22 January 1982 (acting)
- President: Chun Doo-hwan
- Preceded by: Nam Duck-woo
- Succeeded by: (Himself)
- In office 23 January 1982 – 24 June 1982
- President: Chun Doo-hwan
- Preceded by: Nam Duck-woo
- Succeeded by: Kim Sang-hyup

6th Governor of the Bank of Korea
- In office 30 May 1961 – 26 May 1962
- President: Yun Po-sun; Park Chung Hee (acting)
- Prime Minister: Chang Myon
- Preceded by: Chun Ye-yong
- Succeeded by: Min Pyong-do

Personal details
- Born: 6 August 1918 Anshū, Korea, Empire of Japan
- Died: 3 June 2010 (aged 91) Seoul, South Korea
- Education: Hastings College
- Occupation: Politician

Korean name
- Hangul: 유창순
- Hanja: 劉彰順
- RR: Yu Changsun
- MR: Yu Ch'angsun

Yoo Chang-soon (Korean: 유창순; 6 August 1918 – 2 June 2010) was the prime minister of South Korea from January to June 1982.

Yoo was born in Anju, South Pyongan Province, a city located in now North Korea, and attended the Pyongyang Commercial School (평양상업학교). He went on to tertiary education at Hastings College in Nebraska, graduating in 1950. The following year, he entered the service of the South Korean government, working at the Bank of Korea's Tokyo branch. He was governor of the Bank of Korea from 1961 to 1962.
