= 1975 in South Korea =

- Centuries: 20th; 21st
- Decades: 1950s; 1960s; 1970s; 1980s; 1990s
- See also: Other events in 1975; Years in South Korea; Timeline of Korean history 1975 in North Korea

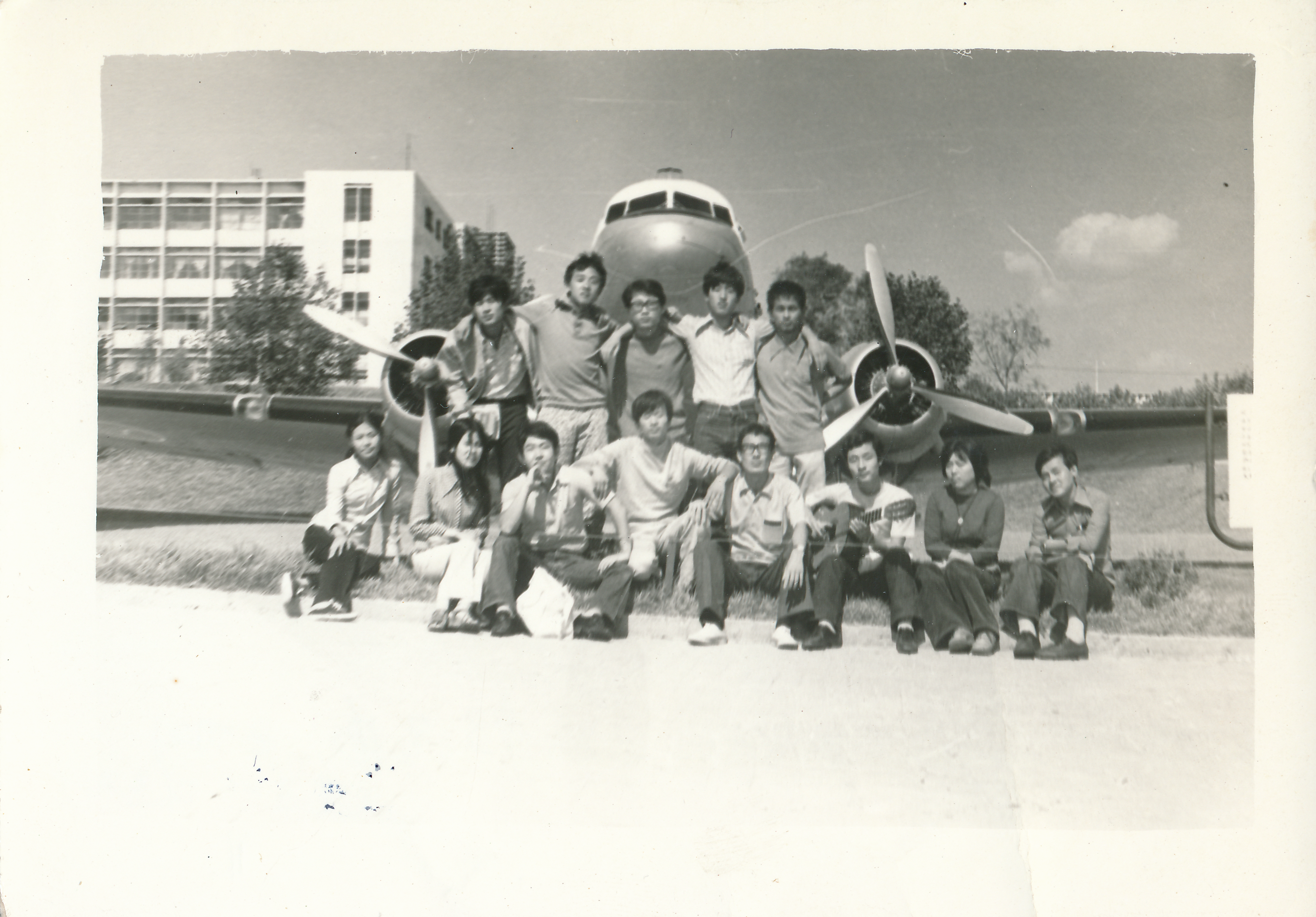
1970년대 중반 중앙대학교 법학과 학생들(최기순 등)

The following lists events that happened during 1975 in the Republic of Korea.

== Incumbents ==
- President: Park Chung-hee
- Prime Minister: Kim Jong-pil (until 19 December), Choi Kyu-hah (starting 19 December)

== Events ==
=== April ===
- April 9 - Eight people were hanged for being involved with the People's Revolutionary Party Incident.

== Births ==
- 17 February - Harisu, pop singer, model and actress
- 2 March - Lee Sun-kyun, actor (d. 2023)
- 11 June – Choi Ji-woo, actress and model
- 13 June - Kim Jo-Sun, archer
- 29 July - Kim Byung-man, comedian

== See also ==
- List of South Korean films of 1975
- Years in Japan
- Years in North Korea
