= Vårt Land (Norwegian newspaper) =

Norwegian newspaper

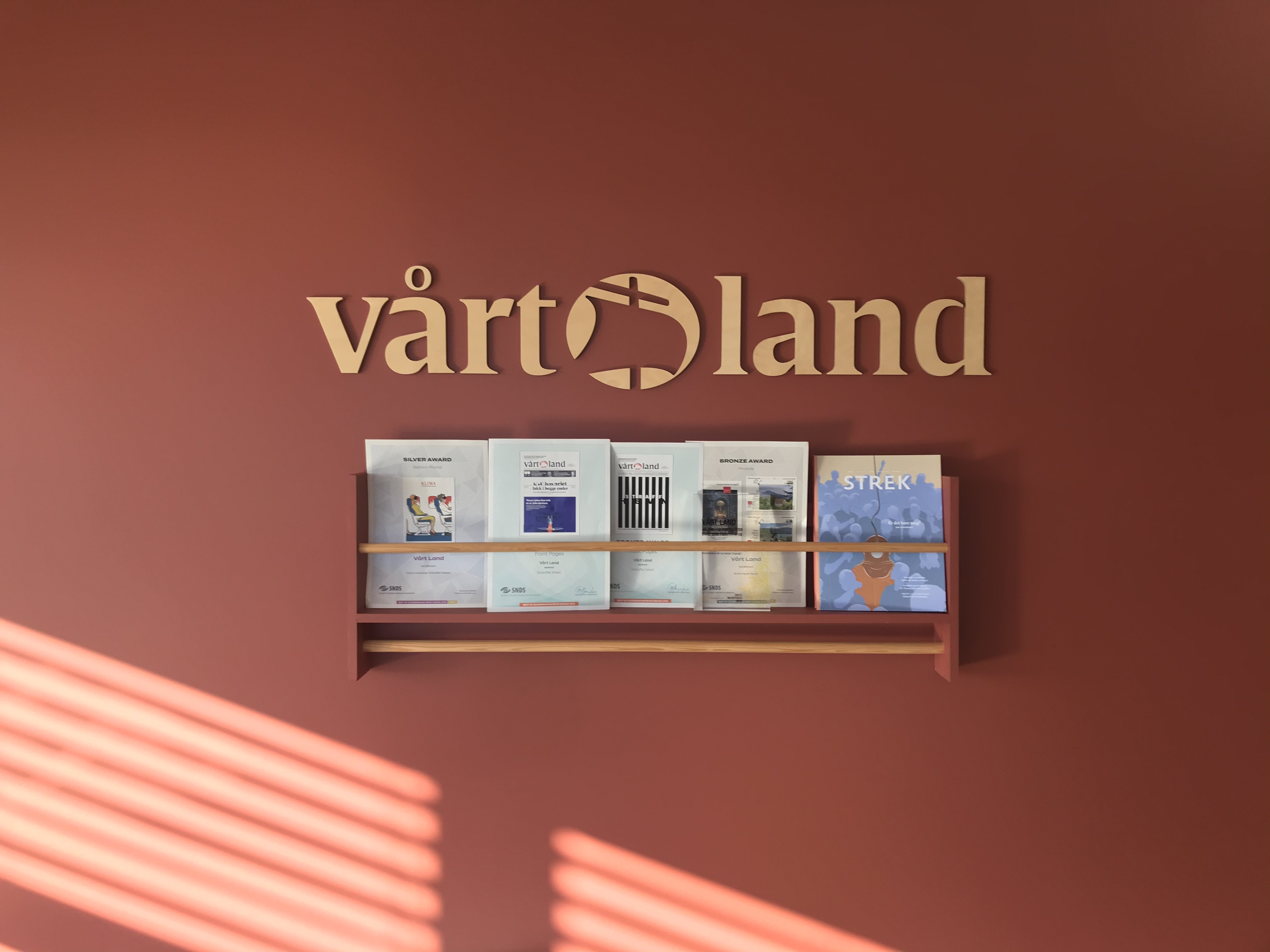

Vårt Land (literally 'Our Country' in Norwegian) is a daily newspaper published in Oslo. It has a nationwide target audience. Its average daily circulation in 2007 was 27,146, making it Norway's 23rd largest newspaper.

== History and profile ==
The founding meeting for Vårt Land was summoned on 28 September 1944, but the first edition was not published until 31 August 1945, with Bjarne Høye as the general editor and John Nome responsible for "spiritual and church-related matters." The newspaper was initially published as a section in Morgenbladet, was subsequently issued as a standalone broadsheet paper, and in 1968 went to a tabloid format. It is owned by Mentor Medier (former Mediehuset Vårt Land), which also owns several related media properties. Vårt Land includes editorial material written in both Bokmål and Nynorsk. The offices of the newspaper have moved many times. In 1983 the newspaper moved its offices to Tveita in Oslo and it was one of the first Norwegian newspapers to use digital technology daily. It is now based in downtown Oslo.

The acting chief editor was Alf Gjøsund until 2019, when Bjørn Kristoffer Bore took over as chief editor. Vårt Land has been published on the internet since 1996. Today, Vårt Land is not only a newspaper, but a part of a media house called Mentor Medier (former Mediehuset Vårt Land).

Vårt Land is an opinion paper. It has a conservative Christian stance in religious matters and a social-liberal leaning in political matters.

The newspaper is dependent on economic support from the Norwegian government.

== Circulation ==
Circulation for Vårt Land 1980–2017.

Circulation grew through the years and peaked at about 30,000 in the beginning of the 1950s. It sank to 18,500 in 1972. It has grown modestly since then, but has recently seen some decrease. The newspaper is determined to invest in future growth.

Numbers from the Norwegian Media Businesses' Association, Mediebedriftenes Landsforening.

- 1980: 24,204
- 1981: 24,391
- 1982: 25,554
- 1983: 26,130
- 1984: 24,986
- 1985: 26,132
- 1986: 27,957
- 1987: 28,011
- 1988: 27,370
- 1989: 27,455
- 1990: 27,014
- 1991: 27,050
- 1992: 27,232
- 1993: 29,095
- 1994: 30,219
- 1995: 30,056
- 1996: 30,005
- 1997: 30,292
- 1998: 30,085
- 1999: 29,373
- 2000: 29,578
- 2001: 29,131
- 2002: 27,770
- 2003: 26,782
- 2004: 27,880
- 2005: 29,158
- 2006: 27,422
- 2007: 27,146
- 2008: 26,344
- 2009: 25,557
- 2010: 24,781
- 2011: 24,448
- 2012: 24,471
- 2013: 23,682
- 2014: 22,630
- 2015: 22,886
- 2016: 22,864
- 2017: 21,503
