= 1993 North Korean local elections =

Elections to provincial and municipal people's assemblies (도·직할시 인민회의 대의원선거 were held in North Korea on November 21, 1993.

== Background ==
On October 12, the Standing Committee of the Supreme People's Assembly announced the Election will be held on November 21, led by Yang Hyong Sop. The election committees were organized til October 25th.The city and county people's assembly elections were not held in the same year because of a revision of the terms of these assemblies from 2 years to 4 years due to a 1992 revision of election law in North Korea.

== Results ==
In total, 3,520 provincial and municipal people's assembly deputies were elected. Voter turnout was reported as 99.9%, with candidates receiving a 100% approval rate.
