= 1989 North Korean local elections =

Elections to provincial, municipal, city, county and district people's assemblies (도 ( 직할시 ) 시 ( 구역 ) · 군 인민회의 선거) were held in North Korea on November 19, 1989.

29,535 provincial, municipal, city, county and district people's assembly deputies were elected.

Voter turnout was reported as 99.73%, with candidates receiving a 100% approval rate.
