= 1999 North Korean local elections =

Elections to provincial, municipal, city, county and district people's assemblies (도·직할시, 시·구역·군 인민위원회 선거) were held in North Korea on March 7, 1999.

29,442 provincial, municipal, city, county and district people's assembly deputies were elected.

Voter turnout was reported as 99.9%, with candidates receiving a 100% approval rate.
