= 1983 North Korean local elections =

Elections to city, county people's assemblies (시 ( 구역 ) · 군 인민회의 선거) were held in North Korea on March 6, 1983. In total, 24,562 city, county and district people's assembly deputies were elected.

Voter turnout was reported as 100%, with candidates receiving a 100% approval rate.
