= Kim Se-jin (activist) =

South Korean politician (1965–1986)

- Hangul: 김세진
- Hanja: 金世鎭
- RR: Gim Sejin
- MR: Kim Sejin

Kim Se-jin (Korean: 김세진; 1965–1986) was a student activist and anti-war peace activist in South Korea who committed suicide by self-immolation.
