= 1991 North Korean local elections =

Elections to city, county and district people's assemblies (시 ( 구역 ) · 군 인민회의 선거) were held in North Korea on November 24, 1991.

In total, 26,074 city, county, and district people's assembly deputies were elected. Voter turnout was reported as 99.89%, with candidates receiving a 100% approval rate.
