= Kim Sang-hyup =

Prime Minister of South Korea from 1982 to 1983

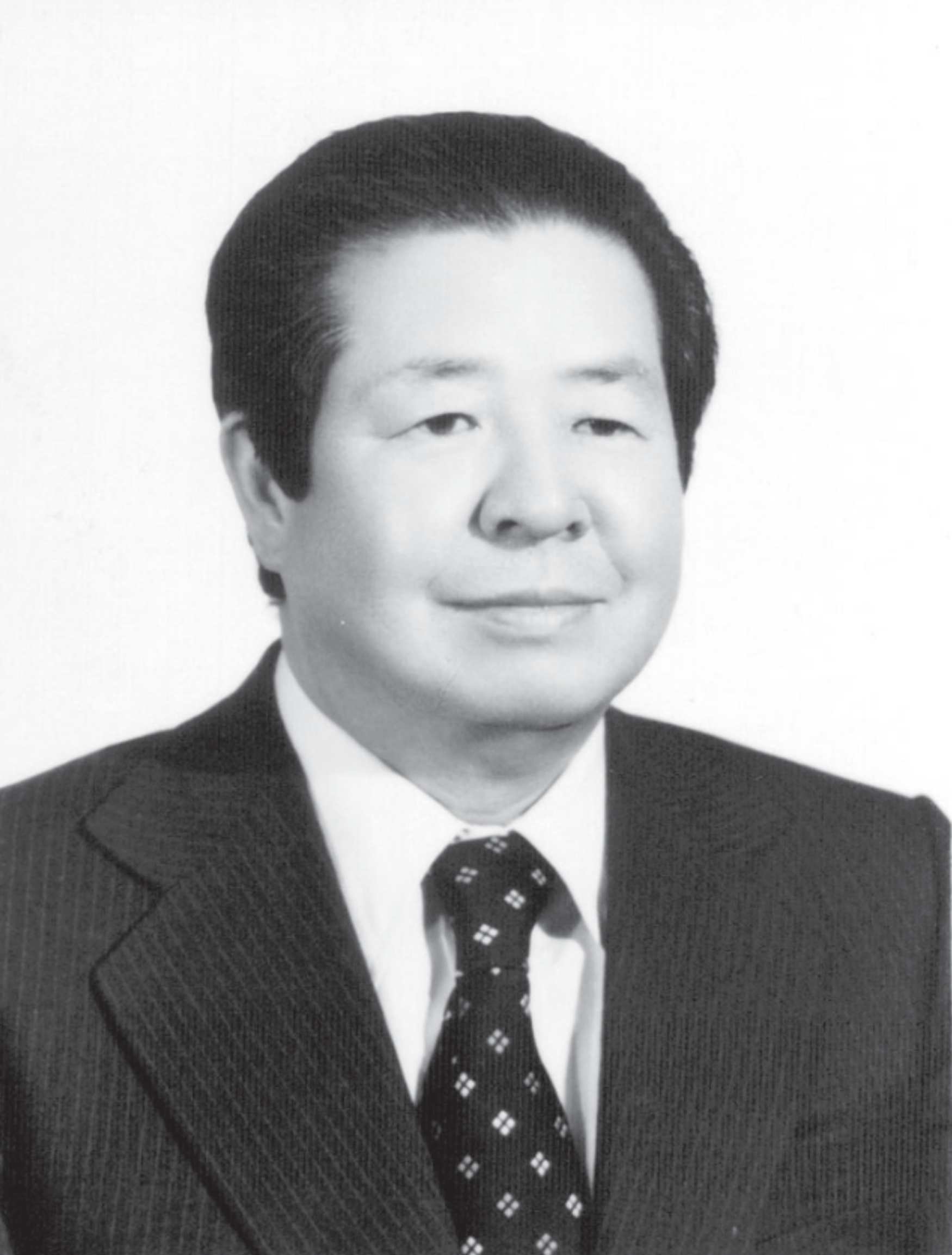

16th Prime Minister of South Korea
- In office 25 June 1982 – 20 September 1983 (acting)
- President: Chun Doo-hwan
- Preceded by: Yoo Chang-soon
- Succeeded by: (Himself)
- In office 21 September 1983 – 14 October 1983
- President: Chun Doo-hwan
- Preceded by: (Himself)
- Succeeded by: Chin Iee-chong

Personal details
- Born: 20 April 1920
- Died: 21 February 1995 (aged 74)
- Education: Political Science
- Alma mater: University of Tokyo

Kim Sang-hyup (Korean: 김상협; 20 April 1920 – 21 February 1995) was a South Korean politician, political scientist, and scholar who served as the prime minister of South Korea, minister of education, president of the Korean Red Cross, and president of Korea University.

== Personal life ==
He was born on 20 April 1920. He suffered a heart attack at his home in Seoul and died at the age of 74 on 21 February 1995.

== Career ==
He graduated from the University of Tokyo in political science. He joined the faculty of Korea University in 1957 and became its president from 1970 to 1975 and 1977 to 1982. He served as education minister during 1962 and president of Korean Red Cross from 1985 to 1991. He became prime minister after the Lee–Chang scandal when Chun Doo-hwan replaced Yoo Chang-soon on 25 June 1982. He was succeeded by Chin Iee-chong on 14 October 1983.
