= 1987 North Korean local elections =

Elections to city, county and district people's assemblies ((시 ( 구역 ) · 군 인민회의 선거) were held in North Korea on November 15, 1987.

26,539 city, county and district people's assembly deputies were elected.

Voter turnout was reported as 100%, with candidates receiving a 100% approval rate.
