= 1985 North Korean local elections =

Elections to provincial, municipal, city, county and district people's assemblies were held in North Korea on February 24, 1985.

In total, 28,793 provincial, municipal, city, county and district people's assembly deputies were elected. Voter turnout was reported as 100%, with candidates receiving a 100% approval rate.
