= Chin Iee-chong =

South Korean politician (1921–1995)

- 진의종
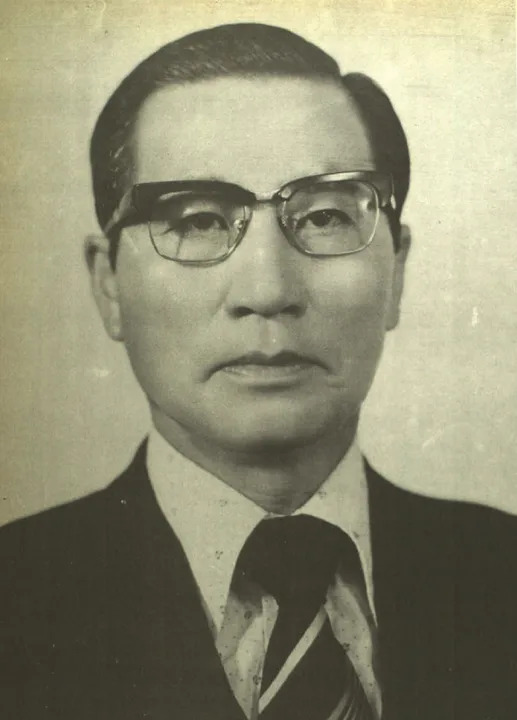

17th Prime Minister of South Korea
- In office 15 October 1983 – 16 October 1983 (acting)
- President: Chun Doo-hwan
- Preceded by: Kim Sang-hyup
- Succeeded by: (Himself)
- In office 17 October 1983 – 18 February 1985
- President: Chun Doo-hwan
- Preceded by: (Himself)
- Succeeded by: Shin Byung-hyun (acting); Lho Shin-yong

Personal details
- Born: 13 December 1921 Kōshō, Zenrahoku-dō, Korea, Empire of Japan
- Died: 11 May 1995 (aged 73) Seoul, South Korea
- Education: Keijō Imperial University
- Occupation: Politician

Korean name
- Hangul: 진의종
- Hanja: 陳懿鍾
- RR: Jin Uijong
- MR: Chin Ŭijong

Chin Iee-chong (Korean: 진의종; 13 December 1921 – 11 May 1995) was a South Korean politician who served as a member of the National Assembly from 1971 and 1973 and as the prime minister of South Korea from 1983 to 1985. He was the founder of Borinara Hagwon Farm, largest barley farm of South Korea.

== Personal life ==
He was born on 13 December 1921 in Gochang County and died on 11 May 1995.

== Career ==
On 14 October 1983, he replaced Kim Sang-hyup as Prime Minister of South Korea. He was head of Council of State which was appointed by Chun Doo-hwan. On 19 February 1985, he resigned as Prime Minister of South Korea. He was succeeded by Lho Shin-yong.

Political offices
Preceded by Kim Sang-hyup	Prime Minister of South Korea; 1983–1985	Succeeded by Lho Shin-yong
