= 1956 North Korean local elections =

1956 local elections in North Korea

Two local elections were held in North Korea in 1956. Elections for town, neighborhood, village, and workers' district people's assemblies took place on November 20, resulting in the election of 54,279 deputies. Elections for provincial, city, county, and district people's assemblies were held a week later, on November 27, electing 1,009 provincial people's assembly deputies and 9,364 city and county people's assembly deputies.

Voter turnout was officially reported as 100%, with all candidates receiving 100% approval.
