= 1979 North Korean local elections =

Elections to city, county and district people's assemblies were held in North Korea on March 11, 1979. In total, 24,247 city, county, and district people's assembly deputies were elected.

Voter turnout was reported as 100%, with candidates receiving a 100% approval rate.
