= Lho Shin-yong =

South Korean politician (1930–2019)

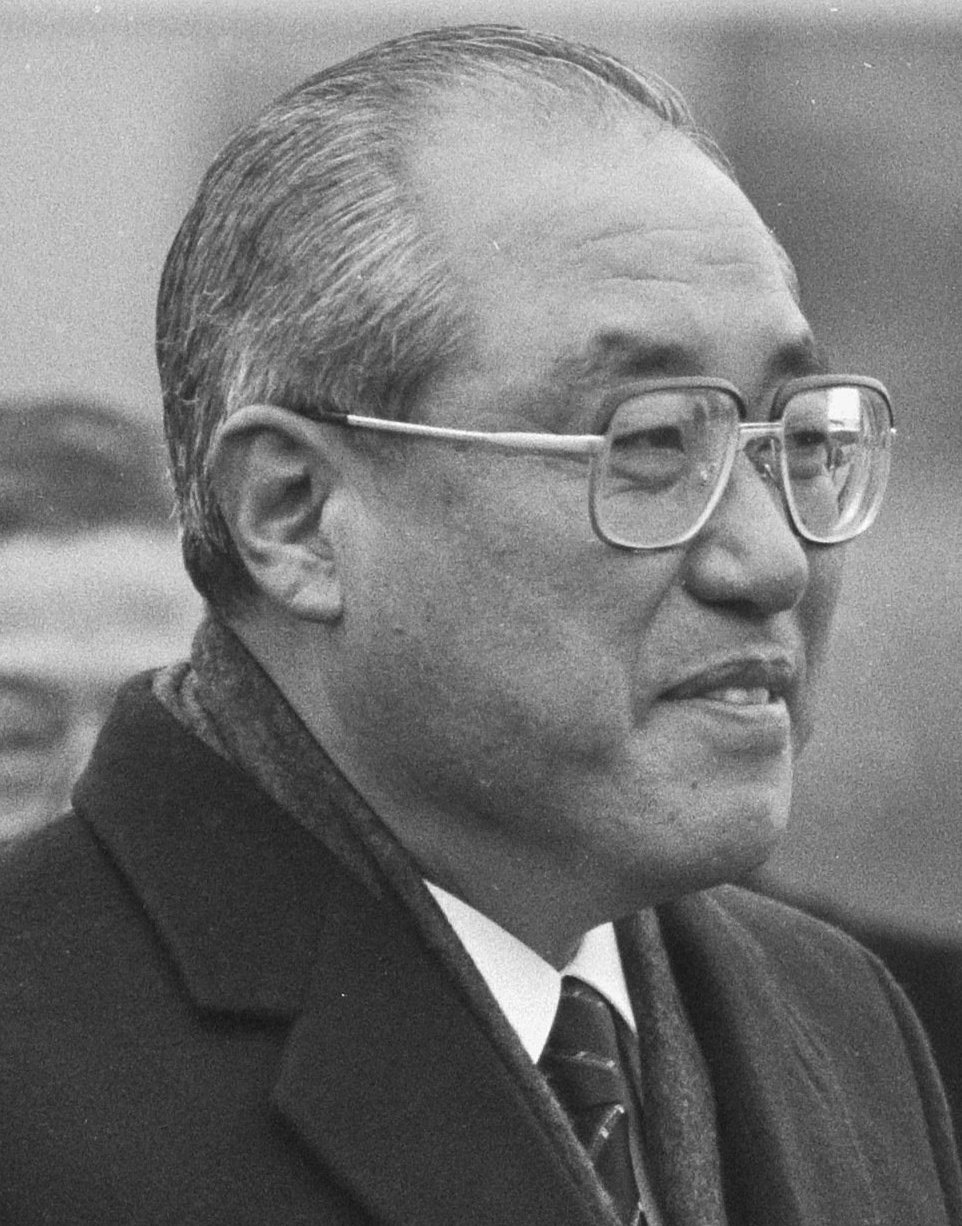

18th Prime Minister of South Korea
- In office 19 February 1985 – 15 May 1985 (acting)
- President: Chun Doo-hwan
- Preceded by: Chin Iee-chong; Shin Byung-hyun (acting)
- Succeeded by: (Himself)
- In office 16 May 1985 – 25 May 1987
- President: Chun Doo-hwan
- Preceded by: (Himself)
- Succeeded by: Lee Han-key (acting); Kim Chung-yul

Director of the Agency of National Security Planning
- In office 2 June 1982 – 18 February 1985
- President: Chun Doo-hwan
- Preceded by: Yoo Hak-seong
- Succeeded by: Jang Se-dong

Minister of Foreign Affairs
- In office 2 September 1980 – 1 June 1982
- President: Chun Doo-hwan
- Preceded by: Pak Tongjin
- Succeeded by: Lee Bum-suk

Personal details
- Born: 28 February 1930 Kōseikuiki, Heian'nan Province, Korea, Empire of Japan
- Died: 21 October 2019 (aged 89) Seoul, South Korea
- Party: Democratic Justice Party
- Education: Seoul National University (LLB); Kentucky State University (MA)

Korean name
- Hangul: 노신영
- Hanja: 盧信永
- RR: No Sinyeong
- MR: No Sinyŏng

Lho Shin-yong (Korean: 노신영, 28 February 1930 – 21 October 2019) was a South Korean politician and diplomat who served as the prime minister of South Korea from 1985 to 1987. A member of the Democratic Justice Party, he served as the minister of foreign affairs from 1980 to 1982 and as the director of the Agency of National Security Planning (ANSP, now National Intelligence Service) from 1982 to 1985.

Beginning his career in the diplomatic service, Lho served as the Consul General to Los Angeles since 1968, Consul General to New Delhi since 1972, Ambassador to India since 1973, Vice Foreign Minister and Permanent Representative in Geneva since 1976. After that he was promoted to the position as Foreign Minister, from 2 September 1980 to 1 June 1982. From 2 June 1982 to 18 February 1985 he served as the ANSP Director. On 19 February 1985 he was appointed the acting PM until 15 May, officially taking the post on the next day, and left office on 25 May 1987.

Political offices
Preceded by Chin Iee-chong	Prime Minister of South Korea; 16 May 1985 – 25 May 1987	Succeeded by Kim Chung-yul
