= Second Battle of Seoul =

1950 battle of the Korean War

- Part of the Korean War
- U.S. Marines return fire on North Korean snipers
| Date | 20–28 September 1950 |
| Location | Seoul, South Korea |
| Result | United Nations victory |

Belligerents
| United Nations; United States; South Korea | North Korea |

Commanders and leaders
| Douglas MacArthur; Arthur Dewey Struble; Edward M. Almond; Oliver P. Smith; David G. Barr; Paik Sun-yup | Choi Yong-kun; Wol Ki Chan; Wan Yong |

Strength
| 1st Marine Division; 7th Infantry Division; Republic of Korea Marine Corps; 17th Regiment | 9th Division; 18th Division; 25th Infantry Brigade; 7,000–30,000; Unknown number of artillery, tanks and aircraft |

Casualties and losses
| (United States) 313 killed (First Republic of Korea) 50 killed | ~14,000 killed and ~7,000 captured |

The Second Battle of Seoul resulted in United Nations forces recapturing Seoul from the North Koreans in late September 1950 during the Korean War.

Following the UN counterattack at Inchon on 15 September, UN forces consolidated their positions south of the Han River and prepared to recapture Seoul.

== Planning ==
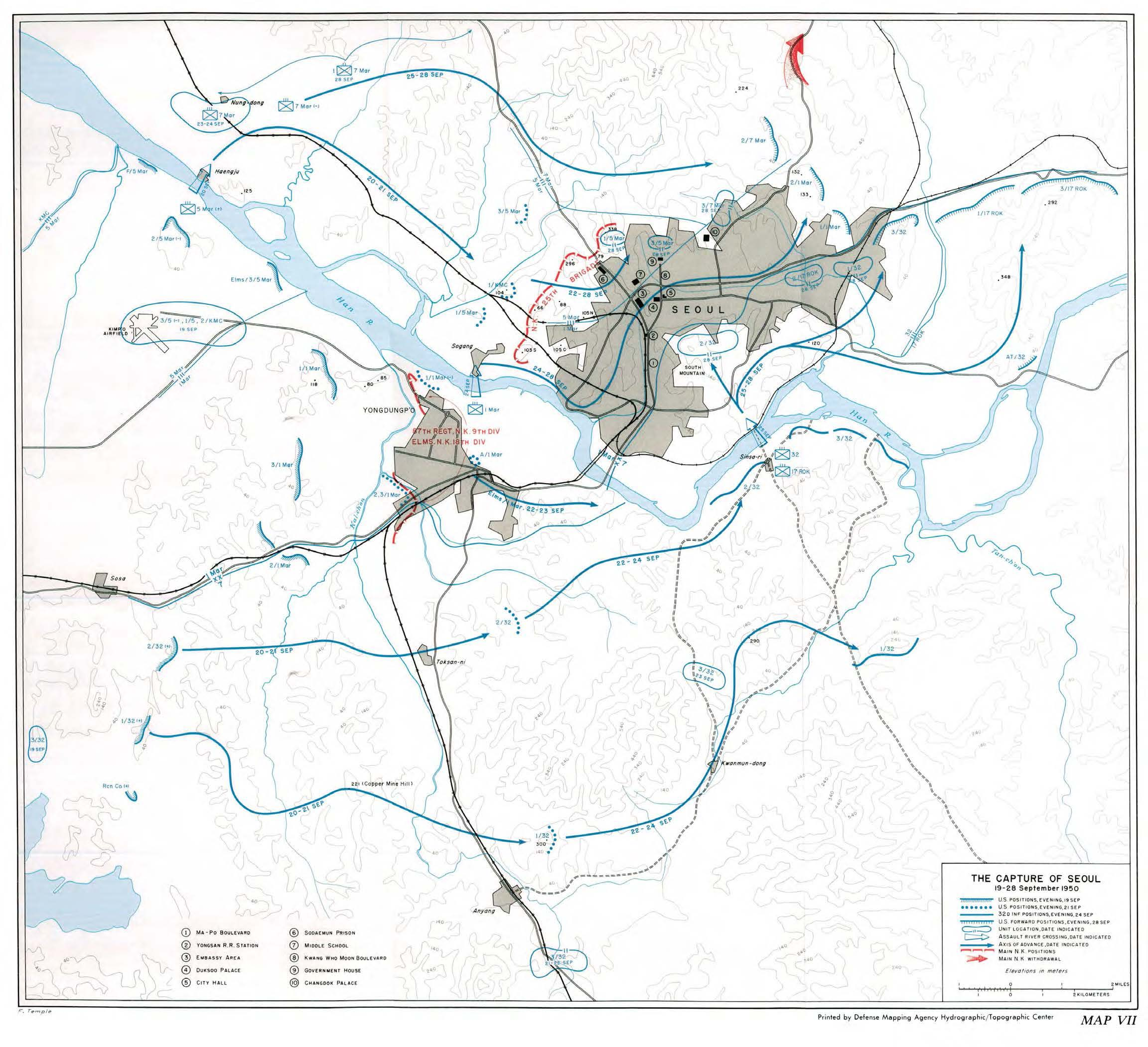
Map of the battle

Before the battle, North Korea had just one understrength Korean People's Army (KPA) division in the city, with the majority of its forces south of the capital.

Mounting indications were that the battle for Seoul would be far more severe than had been the action at Inchon and the advance to the Han. Every day KPA resistance had increased on the road to Yongdungp'o, a big industrial suburb on the south bank of the Han, 3 miles (4.8 km) southwest of Seoul. Aerial observers and fighter pilots reported large bodies of troops moving toward Seoul from the north. The KPA 18th Division, on the point of moving from Seoul to the Naktong front when the landing came at Inchon, was instead ordered to retake Inchon, and its advanced elements had engaged the 1st Marines in the vicinity of Sosa. On the 17th, KPA engineer units began mining the approaches to the Han River near Seoul. About the same time, the KPA 70th Regiment moved from Suwon to join in the battle. As they prepared to cross the Han, the Marines estimated that there might be as many as 20,000 enemy troops in Seoul to defend the city. The X Corps intelligence estimate on 19 September, however, undoubtedly expressed the opinion prevailing among American commanders, that the KPA was "capable of offering stubborn resistance in Seoul but unless substantially reinforced, he is not considered capable of making a successful defense."

== Battle ==
=== Crossing the Han River (20–21 September) ===
The plan for crossing the Han River called for the 5th Marine Regiment to cross at the ferry site (37.607°N 126.809°E) 3 miles (4.8 km) northeast of Kimpo Airfield and 8 miles (13 km) west of Seoul. A swimming party of 14 men, mostly from the Reconnaissance Company, stepped into the Han at 20:00 on the evening of the 19th, crossed safely to the north side, and found that the crossing site was suitable for LVT's. A five-man patrol then continued up the slope of Hill 125 (37.600°N 126.818°E), but turned back short of the crest. The swimming party gave the signal for the rest of the company to cross. When eight of nine LVTs carrying the Reconnaissance Company were in the water enemy mortar and machine gun fire suddenly struck among them. The LVTs turned around and made for the south bank. An hour later the swimming party arrived there with three wounded and one missing. Its plans disrupted, the 5th Marines now began preparing for an assault crossing of the Han after daylight.

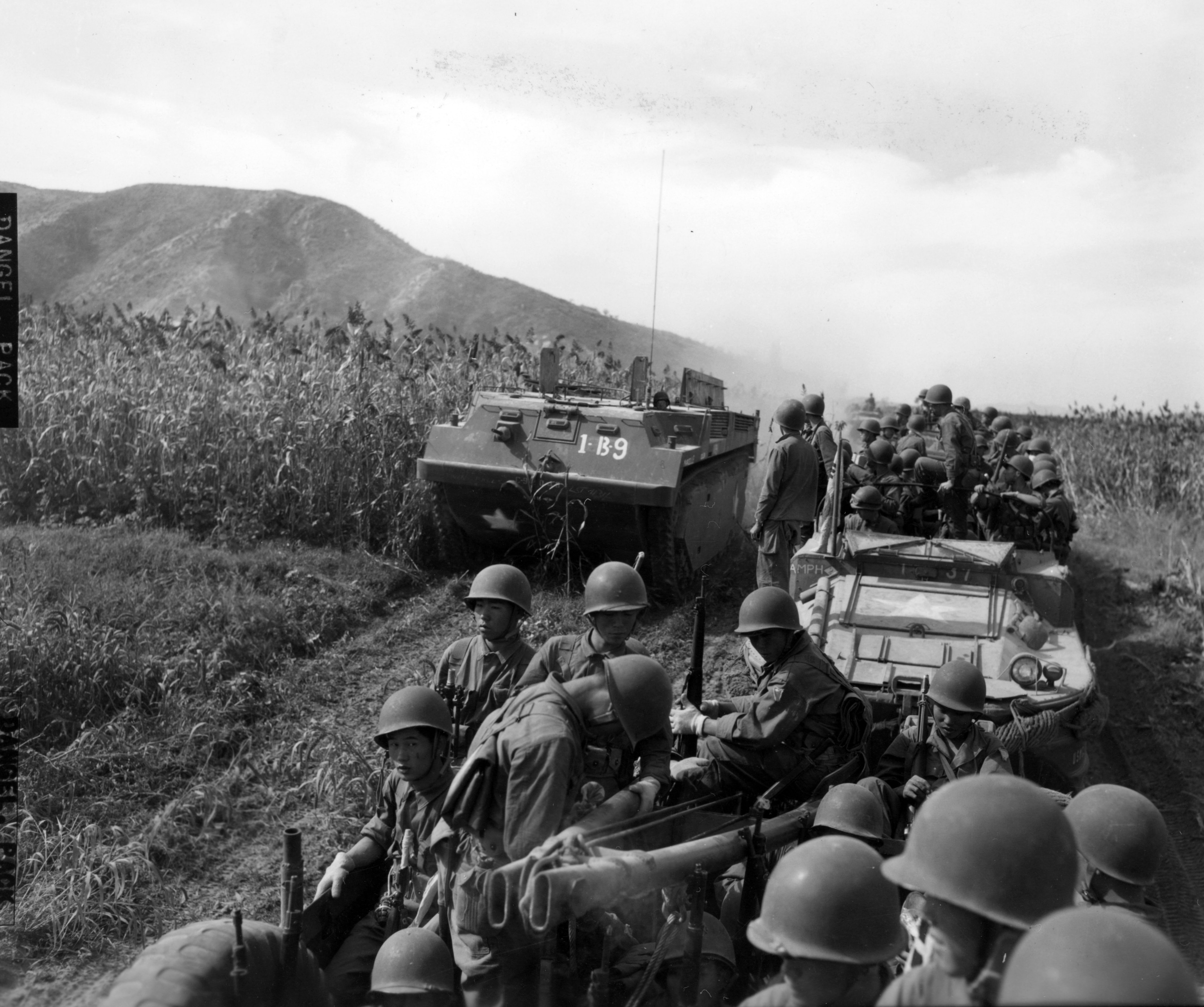
LVTs carrying U.S. and South Korean marines wait to cross the Han River

After a heavy artillery preparation against Hill 125, I Company, 5th Marines, began the assault crossing at 06:45 on 20 September. Enemy fire from automatic weapons and small arms on Hill 125 caused rather heavy casualties in I Company, but it secured the hill by 09:40. Other elements of the 3rd Battalion, still riding LVT's, encountered little or no resistance and proceeded a mile inland to cut the Seoul-Kaesong railroad and a road at the village of Nung-dong by 08:30. Still riding in LVT's they now turned right and moved southeast along the railroad track toward Seoul. The 2nd Battalion followed the 3rd Battalion across the river at 10:00, passed through it, and continued the advance. By nightfall the 5th Marines with 12 tanks, and the 2nd Battalion, Republic of Korea Marine Corps, were across the river. Engineers had begun constructing a pontoon ferry at the crossing site.

On the morning of 21 September, the 5th Marines, after repulsing an enemy company-sized counterattack, advanced southeast astride the rail and road lines paralleling the Han River. Resistance, at first light, steadily increased. The 3rd Battalion captured and turned over to Korean Marines Hill 104 (37.568°N 126.922°E), north of the rail line and 5.5 miles (8.9 km) from the crossing site, and then turned north east toward Hill 296 at the northwest edge of Seoul. In the meantime, the 1st Battalion attacked and captured a series of lower hills south of the rail and road lines (37.561°N 126.913°E). That evening the 5th Marines faced a line of hills running generally north-south along the western edge of Seoul. At the southern end of the line, near the village of Sogang, the 1st Battalion was within 3 miles (4.8 km) of the main railroad station in Seoul.

=== Capture of Yongdungp'o (19–21 September) ===
Advancing on the right (south) of the 5th Marines, the 1st Marine Regiment gradually approached Yongdungp'o. Relieved by the 32nd Infantry Regiment, 7th Infantry Division, in the early afternoon of 19 September, the 1st Battalion, 1st Marines, was ready to shift northeast to hill positions captured during the day by the 5th Marines at the west edge of Yongdungp'o. Because its transportation was late in arriving, darkness had fallen before the 1st Battalion reached its detrucking point. Company A climbed to the summit of Hill 118 (37.541°N 126.857°E) to relieve the occupying force. Later C Company joined it there. Meanwhile, elements of the 1st Battalion, 5th Marines, had departed at 21:00 from Hills 80 (37.542°N 126.878°E) and 85 (37.543°N 126.880°E) nearby, because there was a deadline set for their departure that would enable them to march the 6–8 miles (9.7–12.9 km) to the 5th Marines' Han River crossing site.

After having lost these hills that afternoon to the 5th Marines, the KPA counterattacked just before daylight. Their attack groups left Yongdungp'o, crossed the rice paddies and Kal-ch'on Creek, a sizable stream flowing north past the west edge of the city into the Han, and arrived on Hills 80 and 85 to find them undefended. Part of the KPA force continued on to Hill 118 where A and C (Companies of the 1st Marines repulsed them. The loss of Hills 80 and 85 at the edge of Yongdungp'o that night made it necessary for the 1st Battalion, 1st Marines, to assault them again in the morning. It recaptured Hill 85 only after intense close combat in which there were many Marine casualties.

Simultaneously with the North Korean predawn attack against Hills 80, 85, and 118, a battalion-size force led by five T-34 tanks left Yongdungp'o on the Inchon highway to counterattack the 1st Marines. It ran headlong into the Marine position before daylight and in a flaming battle in the darkness the North Koreans were all but annihilated. In this fight, Private first class Gonegan knocked out two T-34s with his 3.5-inch bazooka and was in the act of firing on a third when he was killed. Dawn disclosed 300 dead KPA soldiers on the road, in the ditches, and strewn about on the adjacent slopes.

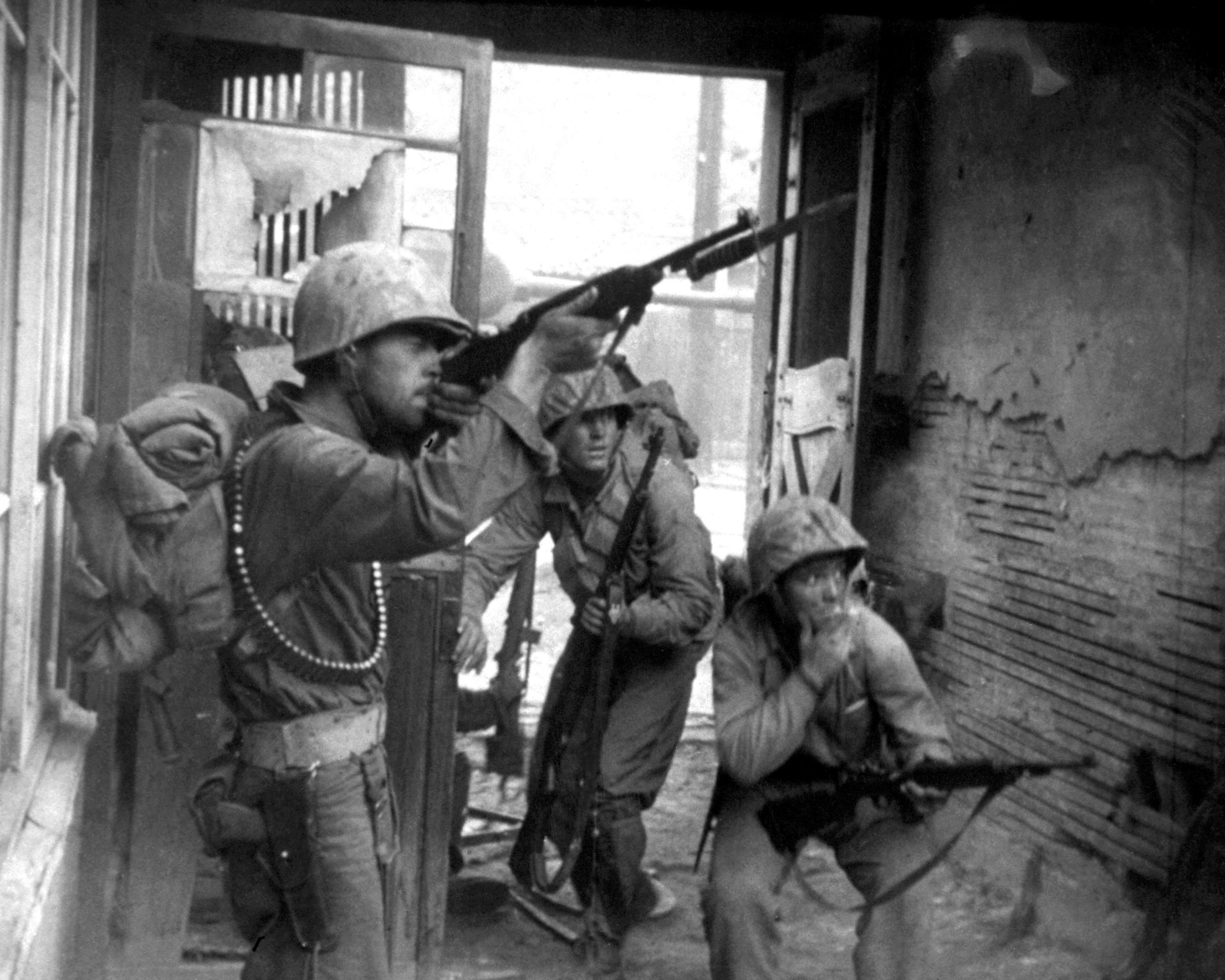
U.S. Marines return fire against North Korean snipers

By 09:45, the main body of the 1st Marines reached the high ground overlooking Yongdungp'o from the west side of Kal-ch'on Creek. Almond arrived there at 10:00 and in a conference with Colonel Puller, the Marine regimental commander, authorized him to shell Yongdungp'o. For the rest of the day the regiment held its place on the west side of the stream while artillery shelled Yongdungp'o and planes bombed it. The artillery barrage continued into the night.

The arc of high ground west of Yongdungp'o was nearest to the city at its northern and southern extremities. At the center, a wide expanse of rice paddies and dikes, as well as Kal-ch'on Creek, separated the hills from the city. Accordingly, the best points from which to attack seemed to be the two extremities of the arc. The 1st Battalion was on the north, closest to the Han; the 2nd Battalion, 1st Marines was on the south along the Inchon highway; the 3rd Battalion, 1st Marines was in reserve. At daybreak, 21 September, the artillery resumed its preparation against Yongdungp'o. Then at 06:30, the Marines attacked. At the northern end of the arc the 1st Battalion moved off Hills 85 and 80 onto the flat rice paddy ground and across Kal-ch'on Creek into the edge of Yongdungp'o. KPA fire caused many casualties and slowed its advance. North Koreans held the dikes at the northwest approach to the city.

The 2nd Battalion at the southern end of the arc (37.512°N 126.886°E) had even harder going. KPA mortar and artillery fire from high ground on that flank took a heavy toll in Marine casualties. By early afternoon, the 2nd Battalion had suffered 85 casualties in crossing the rice paddies bordering Kal-ch'on Creek. Here at the edge of Yongdungp'o, large parts of which were now burning, the KPA fought the battalion to a standstill. The 3rd Battalion, 1st Marines, passed through the hard-hit 2nd Battalion late in the afternoon and continued the attack under heavy artillery fire.

While the heavy battles were in progress on either flank, A Company left Hill 118 and moved behind low, masking hills to approach the dike system in the rice fields near the center of the line directly west of the main part of Yongdungp'o. The company formed an assault line behind a high dike, crossed it, and then advanced through chest-high rice to the deep mud of Kal-ch'on Creek, crossed the stream, reformed in front of another dike on the far side, and then entered the city streets undiscovered. As A Company moved through the empty heart of the town the men could hear sounds of heavy fighting on their right and left. Captain Robert Barrow, the company commander, soon found that he and his men were 700 yards (640 m) inside the town without contact with other friendly units. Barrow realized that he was in the enemy's rear and proceeded to exploit the situation. Soon Barrow's advanced platoon on the left saw KPA troops hurrying west ward along the concrete highway from Seoul-reinforcements for the battle in progress. Its fire surprised and either destroyed or dispersed these troops. Shortly before noon, and after passing almost through the city, Barrow stopped at its eastern side (37.521°N 126.909°E). There he placed his men in a defensive perimeter on both sides of a 30 feet (9.1 m)-high dike upon whose crest ran a surfaced road which joined at this point with the Seoul-Inchon highway.

That afternoon the North Koreans apparently were too busy in the battle at the western edge of the city to give much attention to the unit in their rear, although small groups did make feeble efforts against it. At dusk five tanks attacked A Company, which used bazookas to knock out one and damage two of the tanks. The two undamaged tanks, with machine guns blazing and cannon booming, made five passes along the deeply dug-in infantry 30 yards (27 m) from the levee. Then the tanks withdrew into the city. At 21:00 a KPA infantry force attacked the 3rd Platoon at the northern end of the company perimeter. The platoon repulsed five separate attacks there before midnight. Morning disclosed more than 275 KPA dead in the vicinity of the dike and road intersection and many automatic weapons scattered about on the ground.

On 21 September two developments behind the front occurred that were to affect future tactical operations. First, the third regiment of the 1st Marine Division, the 7th Marine Regiment, arrived in Inchon harbor and began unloading. Second, command of the operation passed from Admiral Struble to General Edward Almond, who at 18:00 assumed command of the Seoul operation ashore at the X Corps' command post in Inchon. At this time there were 49,568 persons, 5,356 vehicles, and 22,222 tons of cargo ashore.

The North Koreans, after their failure during the night of 21-22 September to drive Barrow's company from its advanced position at the eastern edge of Yongdungp'o, apparently abandoned the city before daybreak. The 1st Marines occupied the city the next morning. On the left near the river they reached the destroyed railroad and highway bridges over the Han River 2 miles (3.2 km) east of Yongdungp'o (37.514°N 126.956°E).

The KPA 87th Regiment of the 9th Division and elements of the 18th Division had defended Yongdungp'o. One battalion of the 87th Regiment reportedly suffered 80% casualties in the fighting there. Prisoners revealed that this regiment had left Kumch'on on 16 September to reinforce the Seoul area, traveling in trains that hid in tunnels during the day, and had arrived in the Yongdungp'o area on 20 September, barely in time to enter the fight there.

On the 22nd, the 1st Marine Division issued an operations order setting forth its plan for the seizure of Seoul. The 1st Marines was to cross the Han in the Yongdungp'o area and join the 5th Marines north of the river, forming the division right, while the 7th Marines was to move up from Inchon and go into the line north of the 5th Marines, which then would form the center of a three-regiment line. The plan contemplated that the 1st Marine Division, without the help of other ground units, would capture the city. But that same day, Almond introduced one change in the plan, the ROK Marines and the Republic of Korea Army (ROKA) 17th Regiment were also to be committed in securing the city.

=== Securing the Southern flank (20–24 September) ===
As the 1st Marines fought its way along the Inchon-Seoul highway and into Yongdungp'o, the 7th Infantry Division protected its right flank and engaged KPA units moving toward the battle area from the south. An extensive minefield delayed the 32nd Regiment on the 20th as it attacked toward Anyang-ni where it was to cut the Seoul-Suwon highway. Exploding mines damaged three tanks of A Company, 73rd Tank Battalion, and completely blocked the narrow dirt road the column was following. Colonel Beauchamp, the regimental commander, had a narrow escape. A mine destroyed his jeep, killing the driver and wounding the radio operator a few minutes after he had left it. Engineer troops removed more than 150 mines from this field. The regiment during the day captured T'ongdok Mountain and part of Copper Mine Hill.

On the 21st, the 32nd Infantry seized the rest of Copper Mine Hill. It also captured the high ground 2 miles (3.2 km) south of Yongdungp'o and Hill 300, the high ground immediately northeast of Anyang-ni. The 7th Division Reconnaissance Company arrived at Anyang-ni at 14:30. When darkness fell, the 3rd Battalion, 32nd Infantry, held blocking positions astride the Suwon highway 2 miles (3.2 km) south of Anyang-ni, the 1st Battalion held the road east and the high ground northeast of the town, and elements of the regimental combat team had established contact northward at Toksan-ni with the 2nd Battalion, where the latter had captured a considerable quantity of ordnance and medical supplies.

After arriving at Anyang-ni with the Reconnaissance Company, Major Irwin A. Edwards, Assistant G-2, 7th Division, received radio orders from the division to turn south to Suwon and secure the airfield below the town. Approximately at 16:00, 2nd Lieutenant Jesse F. Van Sant, commanding a tank platoon, took the point with his tanks and, followed by the Reconnaissance Company and Edwards, started toward Suwon. Naval aircraft bombed Suwon just before they arrived there at 18:00 and destroyed a large wooden structure on top of the ancient great stone wall at its East Gate. Debris from this structure blocked the gateway and forced the company to turn aside to find another entrance into the town. At this point, Lieutenant colonel Henry Hampton, 7th Division G-3, arrived from Anyang-ni with a platoon of B Company, 18th Engineer Combat Battalion, and joined the group. Hampton and Edwards with two enlisted men led the column through the streets. Near the center of Suwon the four men surprised two KPA officers in the act of trying to escape in an American jeep. Edwards shot the driver; the other officer, a major of the KPA 105th Armored Division, surrendered. The armored column engaged in some street fighting with scattered groups of enemy soldiers, capturing 37 North Koreans. 3 miles (4.8 km) south of Suwon the column went into a perimeter defense astride the highway. Being without maps, it had unwittingly passed Suwon Airfield a mile back up the road.

About 21:00 a full moon rose and Major general David G. Barr, having lost radio contact with the Reconnaissance Company, decided to send an armored force toward Suwon to find it. Hampton and the platoon of engineers had already loaded into a truck and gone ahead. Task Force Hannum, named after its commander, Lieutenant colonel Calvin S. Hannum, commanding the 73rd Tank Battalion, started from Anyang-ni at 21:25. This motorized force comprised B Company, 73rd Tank Battalion and the battalion Advance Command Group; K Company, 32nd Infantry; C Battery, 48th Field Artillery Battalion; and a medical detachment. Lieutenant colonel John W. Paddock, 7th Division G-2, accompanied it. On the way to Suwon, Paddock established radio contact with Edwards and asked for guides to direct him and his force into the perimeter.

Hannum's armored column reached Suwon near midnight, found the East Gate blocked, and turned aside to enter the town from another point through the ancient stone wall that girds the town on that side. Inside the town a KPA tank hidden behind a building opened fire on the leading American tank, knocking it out with one shot and killing the B Company tank commander who was inside it. In the fight that flared in the next few minutes other American tanks destroyed this T-34, but a second tank escaped. Hannum's force tried to follow it but became lost at the edge of town. Hannum decided to wait for daylight rather than to risk another enemy tank ambush in the darkness.

Meanwhile, Edwards' party in its perimeter south of Suwon heard the sound of tanks northward. Van Sant thought their clatter sounded like T-34's, but the others discounted his comments and hastened preparations to send a party to meet Hannum. Edwards put a Korean civilian and eight men from the Reconnaissance Company into two jeeps. Hampton said he would go along and possibly continue on to rejoin the 7th Division headquarters at Anyang-ni. The party started with Edwards driving the first of four jeeps. A mile northward Edwards saw four tanks approaching in the moonlight. He flicked his lights in a recognition signal for what he thought was Hannum's lead tank. The tank stopped. Then suddenly its machine guns started firing, and it came on toward the halted vehicles. The men jumped from the jeeps and scrambled into the ditches. Hampton, however, started toward the tank waving his arms, evidently still thinking them friendly. Machine gun fire cut him down and the oncoming tank crunched into Edwards' jeep. Edwards escaped and rejoined the Reconnaissance Company the next morning. The KPA tanks rumbled on south and a few minutes later the first one entered the Reconnaissance Company's perimeter. Just ahead of it, an escapee from the jeep party ran into the perimeter and gave the alarm. The second tank reached the edge of the perimeter. Van Sant gave the order to fire. The American M26 Pershing tanks destroyed both T-34's at a range of 40 yards (37 m) or less. The other two T-34's turned and clattered back toward Suwon.

At daylight Hannum led his armored column south through the town, now deserted. Below it he passed the crushed jeeps and the bodies of Hampton and two or three other men killed there. At midmorning Hannum's armored force joined the Reconnaissance Company at Suwon Airfield where Edwards had moved it and Van Sant's tanks at daybreak. Before noon, Colonel Richard P. Ovenshine's 31st Infantry Regiment of the 7th Division (less the 3rd Battalion in division reserve) arrived at Suwon and relieved Task Force Hannum at the airfield. The Reconnaissance Company then reconnoitered south toward Osan. Task Force Hannum rejoined the 7th Division in the Anyang-ni area.

Meanwhile, 7 miles (11 km) northeast of Anyang-ni, KPA forces succeeded in ambushing the lead platoon of B Company, 32nd Infantry, and badly disorganized it. Lieutenant colonel Don C. Faith, Jr., the 1st Battalion commander, withdrew B Company 2 miles (3.2 km), to the vicinity of Kwanmun-dong, closely pursued by the KPA. There the battalion checked the North Koreans. During the day, Lieutenant colonel Charles M. Mount's 2nd Battalion, 32nd Infantry, seized the series of hills from 1–2 miles (1.6–3.2 km) south of the rail and highway bridges that crossed the Han into Seoul.

On 23 September, the 1st Battalion captured its objective, Hill 290 (37.471°N 127.009°E). This hill, 3 miles (4.8 km) below the Han River and 7 miles (11 km) southeast of Yongdungp'o, dominates the approaches to the Han River and Seoul from that direction.

On the morning of 24 September, 2nd Battalion, 32nd Infantry in a predawn attack caught North Koreans asleep in their positions near Sinso-ri and overran them. In this surprise action the battalion captured a regimental headquarters and much equipment, and broke the remaining enemy strength close to the south bank of the river opposite Seoul. During the day the battalion cleared the south bank of the Han in the fold of the river southeast of the city.

=== Attack on Western Seoul (22–25 September) ===
While the 7th Division was securing X Corps' southern flank, the heaviest fighting in the battle for Seoul began at the city's western edge on 22 September and lasted four days.

The KPA defense line at the western edge of Seoul was anchored at the north on Hill 296 just south of the Kaesong highway and west of Seoul's Seodaemun Prison. From the crest of Hill 296 the KPA line curved in a gentle half-moon eastward and southward down spur ridges 2.5 miles (4.0 km) to the Han River, the concave side facing west toward the UN troops. The greater part of this uneven ridge line was dominated by three hills, each 105 meters high, and accordingly known as Hills 105. Hills 105 North (37.573°N 126.950°E) and 105 Center (37.571°N 126.951°E) lay north of the rail and highway lines running into Seoul along the northern bank of the Han River; Hill 105 South (37.569°N 126.9545°E) lay between the rail and road lines and the river. Hills 105 Center and 105 South completely dominated the Pusan-to-Manchuria Kyonggi main rail line and the road that passed through the saddle between them to enter the city. These hills had been a training area for Japanese troops during the Japanese colonial period and since then of both South and North Korean soldiers. The area was well covered with various types of field fortifications and susceptible to quick organization for defense. The main railroad station and Capitol building lay in the center of Seoul 2 miles (3.2 km) east of these positions.

The principal KPA unit manning this line was the 25th Infantry Brigade. Newly formed a month earlier at Ch'orwon, it had started moving by train from that place to Seoul on the day of the Inchon landing, most of it arriving there four days later on 19 September. Colonel Wol Ki Chan commanded the brigade. Most of the brigade's officers and noncommissioned officers had had previous combat experience with the Chinese People's Liberation Army. The brigade numbered about 2,500 men, and apparently was composed of two infantry battalions, four heavy machine gun battalions, an engineer battalion, a 76-mm. artillery battalion, a 120-mm. mortar battalion, and miscellaneous service troops. It and the 78th Independent Regiment defended both the military and topographic crests. Foxholes, undercut into the slopes, gave protection from overhead shell air bursts. Concrete caves held supplies. More than 50 heavy machine guns with interlocking fields of fire dotted this defensive position.

On the morning of 22 September the 5th Marines set out to capture these last hills in front of Seoul. On the north flank the 3rd Battalion's objective was Hill 296. In the center, the objective of the 2nd Battalion, ROK Marines, was Hill 105 Center, but the battalion had to take two knobs called Hills 56 (37.566°N 126.936°E) and 88 (37.569°N 126.947°E) before reaching 105-C behind them. On the south flank across the railroad track the 1st Battalion, 5th Marines, objective was Hill 105 South. The attack began at 07:00. Two hours later the 3rd Battalion on the north reported it had captured its objective against only moderate resistance, but this report was misleading because the battalion did not have control of the southern slopes and ridges of Hill 296 where the KPA strength was concentrated. On the southern flank heavy KPA fire stopped the 1st Battalion for a while, but late in the day it took Hill 105-S after a smashing artillery and mortar preparation. KPA artillery scored too, some of its fire landing in the 1st Battalion rear areas and inflicting 39 casualties there during the day, including six killed.

In the center, KPA fire decimated the ROK Marine battalion in its attack against Hill 56. Almost as soon as the 1st KMC Battalion’s attack from Hill 104 (37.568°N 126.923°E) began, it ran into stiff opposition as the KPA poured small arms and mortar fire, as well as punishing artillery fire onto the South Koreans. Even as the Korean Marines attacked, KPA detachments continued to infiltrate into prepared defensive positions. KPA fire held up both the 1st KMC Battalion and 2nd Battalion, 5th Marines, until concentrated air and artillery strikes removed the stubborn defenders from the base of Hill 104. Marine air strikes tried in vain to destroy the KPA positions. Later, North Korean prisoners said that the 25th Brigade had 40% casualties that day. By nightfall on 22 September, the Korean Marines had been compelled to withdraw to Hill 104, their original starting point. Lieutenant colonel Murray directed a rifle company from 1st Battalion, 5th Marines, to provide supporting fire the next morning from the adjacent summit of Hill 105-S when Major Koh’s battalion renewed its attack in an effort to regain lost ground.

On the morning of 23 September, Murray directed the 1st KMC Battalion to attack from Hill 104 at 07:00 in an attempt to straighten the line. The 1st and 3rd Battalions, 5th Marines, were to remain in position and assist the advance by fire. The KPA on Hill 56 greeted the renewed Korean Marine attack with heavy small arms and mortar fire which halted the KMC attack dead in its tracks. Suffering heavy casualties (32 killed and 68 wounded), the South Korean Marine attack made little significant progress and the unit was spent. Lieutenant colonel Harold S. Roise, commanding officer of the 2nd Battalion, 5th Marines, conferred with Murray, who ordered his Marines to conduct a passage of lines through the KMC battalion and renew the attack on Hill 56. The 2nd KMC Battalion was relieved from guarding the crossing site and assigned to screen the left [north] flank of the 5th Marines. Pulled back into division reserve, the 1st KMC Battalion reorganized and reentered the lines in support of 2nd Battalion, 5th Marines.

Senior U.S. Marine advisor to the Korean Marines, Lieutenant colonel Charles W. Harrison, in assessing the South Korean Marine assault from Hill 104, later wrote:

The Korean Marines were very valuable in mopping up, screening, and reconnaissance missions because of their familiarity with the terrain and the civilian population. Their limited training, almost complete lack of experience in the use of supporting arms, and the absence of certain tools, e.g., flamethrowers, 3.5-inch rocket launchers, etc., rendered them, however, incapable at that time of successfully assaulting a heavily defended position. Their failure here was a bitter pill to the Koreans, but it was only to be expected.

At midafternoon the 2nd Battalion, 5th Marines took over the attack in the center. After sustaining many casualties with little gain, the lead company (D) dug in for the night, short of the KPA-held ridge. In another furious fight, one platoon of F Company suffered so many casualties it had only seven men left for duty at nightfall. Meanwhile, the rest of the regiment had held in place on the flanks and repelled counterattacks during the day.

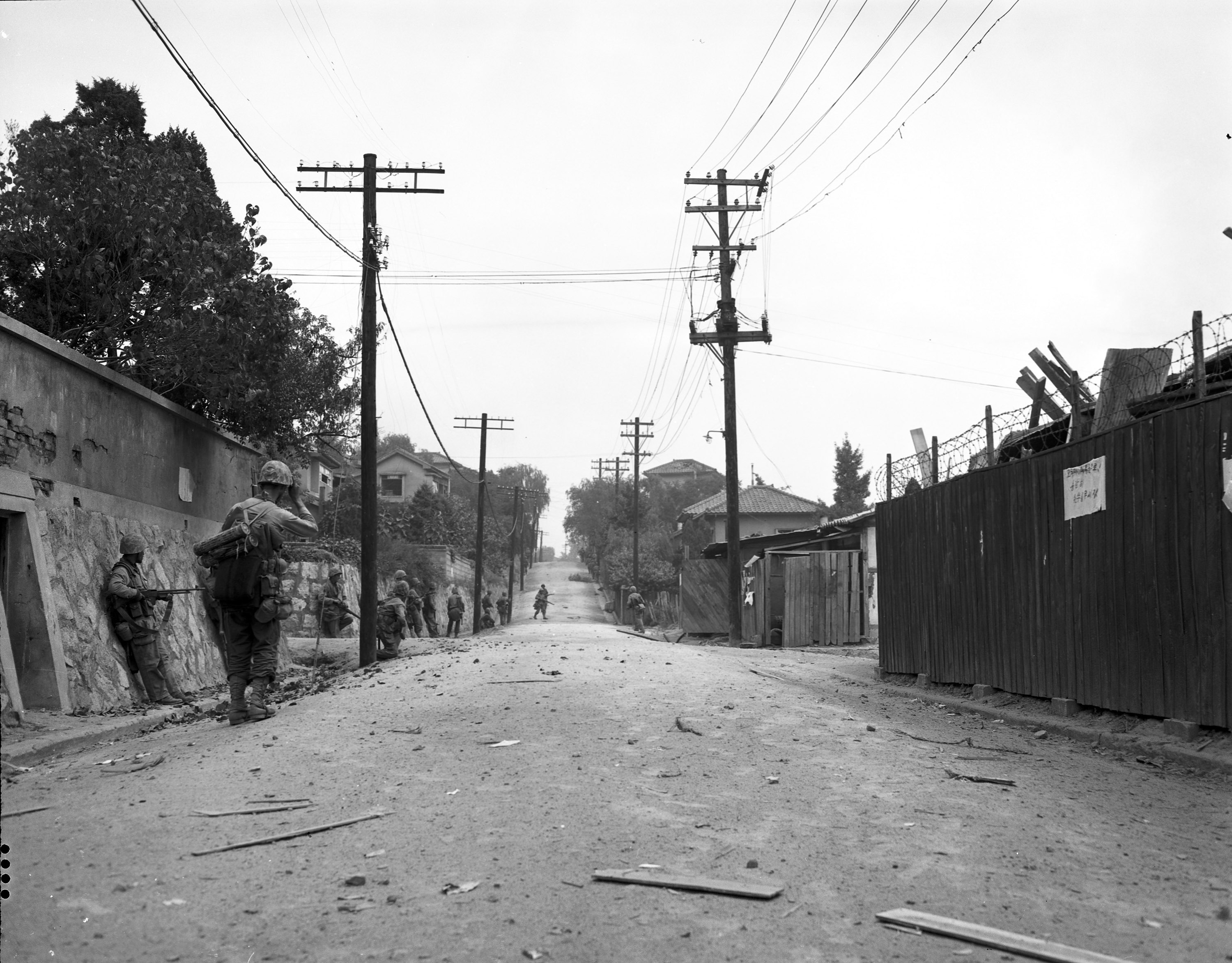
G Company, 5th Marines clear snipers in a residential section of Seoul

At noon on 23 September General Oliver P. Smith had ordered the 7th Marines, which had begun unloading at Inchon on the 21st, to cross the Han and come up behind the 5th Marines. During the day X Corps headquarters moved from Inchon to Ascom City, about halfway to Seoul on the main Inchon-Seoul highway.

After daylight on the 24th, elements of the 3rd Battalion, 5th Marines, started down the finger ridge from Hill 296, hoping to outflank the KPA in front of the 2nd Battalion in the center. Simultaneously, D Company moved out in assault against the ridge line. A heavy morning mist shrouded the company as it crossed the low ground and reached the base of Hill 56. Unexpectedly, the lead elements came upon KPA troops in their trenches. Neither side saw the other because of the fog and smoke until they were at close quarters. A grenade battle started immediately. One squad of 12 Marines in trying to maneuver around the southern tip of the ridge was wiped out except for three wounded who escaped. In an effort to break the deadlock, Marine air strikes came in repeatedly. In the course of two such attacks, North Korean anti aircraft fire damaged five of ten planes. Enemy automatic and mortar fire became intense after the fog lifted.

In the early afternoon the 30 remaining effectives in D Company's rifle platoons and 14 other men assembled from the Weapons Platoon; ammunition carriers, and company headquarters prepared for a desperate assault against the ridge line of Hill 56. Thirty-three men were to make the assault up the last 150 yards (140 m) of the slope, 11 others were to follow with machine guns and ammunition. F4U Corsairs came over for final strafing runs, bombing, and napalming of the KPA position. This done, the 33 men, at a prearranged signal of a Corsair's second dry run over the KPA, jumped from their holes and charged forward in a 100 yards (91 m)-long line. The D Company commander was killed in front of his men. The others kept going and 26 of them reached the top. The headlong charge surprised the North Koreans; in a sudden panic many ran down the back slope, others feigned death, and some fought back. KPA dead were stacked up everywhere-in foxholes, in bunkers, and many were strewn about over the ground. When all of D Company's men reached the top there were 56 men to defend it, 26 of them wounded but refusing evacuation. They held the hill against a counterattack. During this day, D Company suffered 176 casualties among its 206 men, 36 killed, 116 wounded and evacuated, and 26 more wounded but present for duty.

D Company's capture of Hill 56 on the afternoon of the 24th was the decisive action in the battle at the western gate to Seoul. The 2nd Battalion on the morning of the 25th resumed the attack toward Hill 105 Center. Artillery and fighter bombers pounded the hill line all morning. From recently captured Hill 66, D Company advanced northward slowly during the morning up the shank of the fishhook ridge line that slanted southwest from Hill 296, and then turned southeast to capture Hill 88 at the point of the hook just after noon. By midafternoon other elements of the 2nd Battalion had captured Hill 105 Center and the 3rd Battalion had gained control of Hill 105 North after very heavy fighting. According to prisoners, three KPA battalions lost 500 men during the day trying to hold the northern hill. The western defenses of Seoul had fallen. More than 1,200 dead KPA soldiers lay on their stubbornly defended positions. Marine estimates placed the total number of KPA killed there by all arms at 1,750.

When the KPA defenses at the western edge of Seoul fell on 25 September, the 1st Marine Division had all its regiments together north of the Han River. At 22:00 on the night of 23 September, the division had issued an operations order, confirming earlier verbal orders, directing the 1st Marines to cross the Han River early the next morning.

During the morning of 24 September the 1st Marines began crossing the Han from Yongdungp'o, where the 1st Battalion, 5th Marines, protected the crossing site. Before dark the regiment had crossed to the north side and the 1st and 2nd Battalions had taken over from the 1st Battalion, 5th Marines, the southern flank of the Marine line at the western edge of Seoul. By now the 7th Marines had moved up on the left flank of the 5th Marines, with the mission of cutting across the northern edge of Seoul and blocking escape routes there. The 3rd Battalion of the 187th Airborne Regiment airlifted from Ashiya, Japan, to Kimpo Airfield on the 24th and upon arrival there assumed responsibility for the airfield.

On the morning of 25 September, two platoons of tanks from B Company, 1st Tank Battalion, including two dozer tanks and a section of flame-throwing tanks, accompanied by a platoon of engineers and another of infantry set out to join the 1st Marines in Seoul. Near the base of Hill 105 South, a KPA force with several antitank guns ambushed the column. The fighting was heavy and the outcome in doubt for several minutes until a flame-thrower tank reached a point from which it poured flame into the KPA trenches. Many North Korean soldiers broke from cover. Machine gun fire from other tanks cut them down as they ran. Several North Koreans came out of a previously undiscovered cave and surrendered. When a large group inside the cave saw these men unhurt they too surrendered. Of the nearly 300 North Koreans that attacked this armored column, approximately 150 were killed and 131 captured. The tank column joined Puller's 1st Marines in Seoul at noon. During the morning the 3rd Battalion, 1st Marines, made a 90-degree turn northward to change the regimental direction of attack from eastward to northward toward the heart of the city. While it was doing this, the 1st Battalion on its right held a blocking position at the southern edge of Seoul. Once the 3rd Battalion had turned northward, the 1st Battalion pivoted to orient its attack northward abreast of and on the right of it. Street fighting now began in Seoul, 25 September, in the zone of the 1st Marines just as the 5th Marines completed its capture of the North Korean defensive hill line at the western edge of the city.

=== 32nd Infantry enters Seoul (25–26 September) ===
The original operations plan required the 1st Marine Division to clear the city. However the expected capture of Seoul by the Marines was moving behind schedule. The stubborn KPA defense had denied the Marine division any important advance for three days. Almond had been growing increasingly impatient. Seoul was a symbol in the Korean War, just as Paris, Rome, and Berlin had been in World War II. It was a political and psychological as well as a military target. MacArthur desired to capture the city as soon as possible and restore the Korean capital to its people.

Dissatisfied with the Marines' progress, Almond on 23 September told Smith that he could continue his frontal assaults, but he strongly urged him to use the space south of the Han River for an envelopment maneuver by the 1st Marines. Smith was unwilling to act on Almond's suggestion because he wanted to unite the 1st and 5th Marines on the north side of the Han instead of having them on opposite sides of the river. Almond told Smith that he would give him 24 hours longer to make headway. If Smith could not, Almond said, he would change division boundaries and bring the 7th Infantry Division and its 32nd Regiment into the battle for the envelopment of the KPA defenses in Seoul.

On the morning of 24 September the KPA still held the Marines at the western edge of Seoul. About 09:30 Almond arrived at 7th Division headquarters and conferred with Barr, the 7th Division commander, Brigadier general Henry I. Hodes, assistant 7th Division commander and Colonel Louis T. Heath, the division chief of staff. Almond told Barr he had tentatively decided that the 7th Division would attack across the Han River into Seoul the next morning. Almond then returned to his command post and there told Colonel Paik Sun-yup, commander of the ROKA 17th Regiment, that he expected to attach his regiment to the 32nd Infantry for the attack on Seoul.

His mind now made up, Almond called a commanders' conference to meet with him at 14:00 at Yongdungp'o Circle. Present besides Almond were Generals Smith, Barr and Hodes, Colonels Forney and Beauchamp, and Colonel John H. Chiles. In this open-air meeting, Almond quickly told the assembled commanders that he was changing the boundary between the 1st Marine Division and the 7th Infantry Division, and that the 32nd Regiment, with the ROKA 17th Regiment attached, would attack across the Han River into Seoul at 06:00 the next morning. The meeting was brief, at its conclusion the officers dispersed at once to make their respective plans.

In the afternoon and evening, X Corps attached the ROKA 17th Regiment, the Marine 1st Amphibious Tractor Battalion (less one company), and two platoons of A Company, 56th Amphibious Tank and Tractor Battalion, to the 7th Division to support the crossing. The crossing was to be at the Sinsa-ri ferry, 3 miles (4.8 km) east of the main rail and highway bridges over the Han River. On the opposite (north) bank, Namsan extended from the river northwest 2 miles (3.2 km) into the heart of Seoul, culminating in a peak 900 feet (270 m) high, the highest point in the city, about 1 mile (1.6 km) east of the main Seoul rail station. A long, ridgelike, shallow saddle connected this peak with a slightly lower one. On a western finger ridge of the main peak, near the 350 feet (110 m) elevation and only 0.5 miles (0.80 km) from the rail station, was a large shrine and a formally landscaped park. From the western base of Namsan a long series of steps led up to this shrine and park. Viewing Seoul on a north-south axis, the peak of Namsan was halfway into the city. The Capitol building, at the northern edge of the city, lay two miles away. The main highway and rail line running east out of the city passed about a mile beyond the northern base of Namsan. On this mountain nearly three months before, a company of ROK soldiers had conducted the last action in the defense of Seoul, purportedly dying to the last man.

The 32nd Infantry's mission was first to seize and secure Namsan, then to secure Hill 120 (37.554°N 126.809°E) situated 2 miles (3.2 km) eastward at the southeast edge of Seoul, and finally to seize and secure Hill 348 (37.571°N 127.096°E), a large, high hill mass 5 miles (8.0 km) east of Seoul and dominating the highway and rail line entering the city from that side. The regiment had a strength of 4,912 men as it prepared for the crossing - 3,110 Americans and 1,802 ROKA.

Before daybreak of the 25th, Hodes established an advanced division command post near the river from which he was to direct the crossing operation. At 04:00 Almond, Struble and members of the corps staff departed the X Corps headquarters at Ascom City to watch the crossing of the 32nd Regiment. Barr went forward at 04:30 to the 32nd Infantry's command post and an hour later he and Beauchamp left for an observation post near the river. At 06:00, the 48th Field Artillery Battalion began firing a 30-minute artillery preparation, and the heavy mortars joined in to pound the cliffs lining the opposite side beyond the river bank.

Colonel Mount's 2nd Battalion, selected to make the assault crossing, loaded into LVTs in its assembly area and at 06:30 F Company started across the Han. A ground fog obscured the river area. The entire 2nd Battalion reached the north bank without loss of personnel or equipment. The 2nd Battalion hurried across the narrow river beach, scaled the 30–60 feet (9.1–18.3 m) cliffs, and moved rapidly to the slopes of Namsan. An hour after the first troops had crossed the river the bright morning sun dispersed the ground fog. Air strikes then came in on Namsan and Hill 120. Apparently this crossing surprised the North Koreans as their works on Namsan were only lightly manned.

The 1st Battalion, commanded by Faith, followed the 2nd across the Han and at 08:30 started to move east along the river bank toward Hill 120. Just after noon the 3rd Battalion crossed the river, followed the 1st Battalion eastward, and passed through it to occupy Hill 120. The 1st Battalion then took a position between the 3rd and 2nd Battalions. The ROKA 17th Regiment crossed the Han immediately behind the 3rd Battalion and moved to the extreme right flank of the 32nd Infantry line where, at 21:50, it began an all-night attack toward Hill 348.

While the rest of the regiment crossed the Han behind it and moved eastward, the 2nd Battalion climbed the slopes of Namsan, reaching and clearing the summit against moderate resistance by 15:00. Once there, it immediately began digging in on a tight perimeter. The North Koreans did not counterattack Namsan as quickly as expected. The night passed tensely but quietly for the waiting 2nd Battalion. Finally, at 04:30 on the morning of the 26th, the soldiers heard tanks moving about and the sound of automatic weapons fire to their front. In semi-darkness half an hour later a large enemy force, estimated to number approximately 1,000 men, violently counterattacked the 2nd Battalion perimeter on top of Namsan. On the higher western knob of the mountain, G Company held its position against this attack, but on the lower eastern knob North Koreans overran F Company. Using all its reserves 2nd battalion finally restored its positions at 07:00 after two hours of battle and drove the surviving enemy down the slopes. Mount's men counted 110 KPA dead within its perimeter and 284 more outside for a total of 394 killed and took 174 prisoners.

E Company mopped up enemy troops on the rear slopes of the mountain and in the area at its base near the river. Later in the morning, elements of the 1st Battalion had a sharp engagement in the streets immediately north of Namsan, capturing there some 80 KPA, apparently a remnant of the force that had counterattacked Namsan.

To the east, the 1st Battalion on the morning of the 26th engaged in a heavy fire fight while the 3rd Battalion, commanded by Lieutenant colonel Heinrich G. Schumann, advanced from Hill 120 toward Hill 348, 4 miles (6.4 km) farther east. In this advance, L Company saw a large column of enemy troops on the highway leaving Seoul. The company commander; 1st Lieutenant Harry J. McCaffrey, Jr., seized the opportunity for surprise and immediately ordered his men to attack. His initiative paid off. In the ensuing action, L Company killed about 500 KPA, destroyed five tanks, destroyed or captured more than 40 vehicles, three artillery pieces, seven machine guns, two ammunition dumps, much clothing and POL products, and overran and captured a large headquarters of Corps size, which may have been the principal enemy headquarters in the defense of Seoul.

By midafternoon on 26 September the ROKA 17th Regiment had captured Hills 348 and 292 (37.594°N 127.113°E) dominating the highway 4 miles (6.4 km) east of Seoul. That evening the 32nd Infantry and the ROKA 17th Regiment cleared their zone of the KPA, and E Company established contact with the marines on the regimental left at the western base of Namsan.

=== Battle of the Barricades (26–28 September) ===
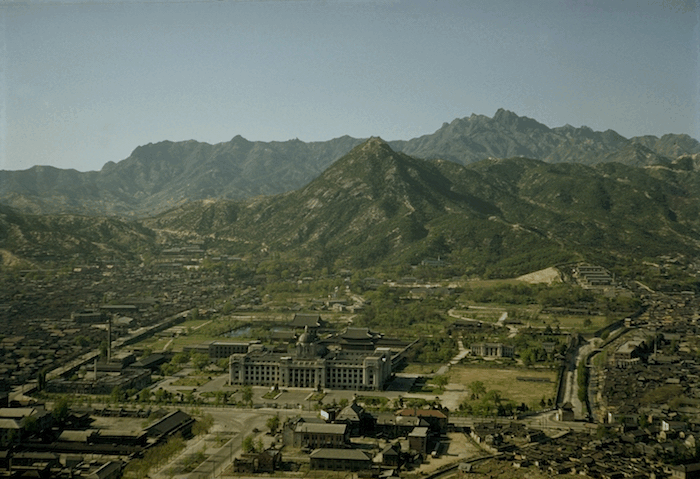
Central Seoul with the Capitol building and Gyeongbokgung palace and Hill 338 behind it

On 25 September, while the 32nd Infantry crossed the Han and seized Namsan, the 1st Marine Division entered Seoul proper. When the 1st Marine Regiment turned north that day, ahead of it lay the main Seoul railroad station, the French, American and Russian consulates, the City Hall, the Duk Soo Palace of ancient rulers of Korea and Museum of Art, and the main business and hotel area. The 5th Marines, on the other hand, was just entering the city in the northwest quarter, pointed generally eastward toward the Capitol building. Its course would take it past Soedaemun Prison. Beyond the Capitol lay Changdok Palace and the Royal Gardens. That evening the 1st and 5th Marines made plans for a coordinated attack the next morning.

Just before dusk an air report claimed that enemy columns were streaming north out of the city. Almond at X Corps headquarters immediately sent a message to the Far East Air ForceS requesting a flare mission to illuminate the roads so that Marine night fighters could attack the enemy troops. A B-29 dropped flares for several hours and two long columns of enemy soldiers came under air attack. Corps artillery placed interdiction fire on the closer portions of the escape route.

At 20:40 that evening a X Corps flash message from Almond came over the teletype to the 1st Marine Division saying, "X Corps TACAir Commander reports enemy fleeing city of Seoul on road north.... He is conducting heavy air attack and will continue same. You will push attack now to the limit of your objective in order to insure maximum destruction of enemy forces." Colonel Alpha L. Bowser, 1st Marine Division operations officer, doubted that the enemy was fleeing the city. He telephoned the X Corps' operations officer and questioned the order to "attack now," but that officer told him to attack as ordered. Bowser then gave the message to Smith who in turn telephoned General Ruffner, X Corps chief of staff, objecting to the order. Smith did not believe the enemy was leaving Seoul and he did not want to attack through the city at night. Ruffner told him that Almond personally had dictated the order and that it was to be executed without delay. Smith then telephoned Colonels Puller and Murray at 22:00 and transmitted the order. He told them to concentrate their advance along avenues that could be identified easily at night, and ordered the three Marine regiments to establish contact with each other.

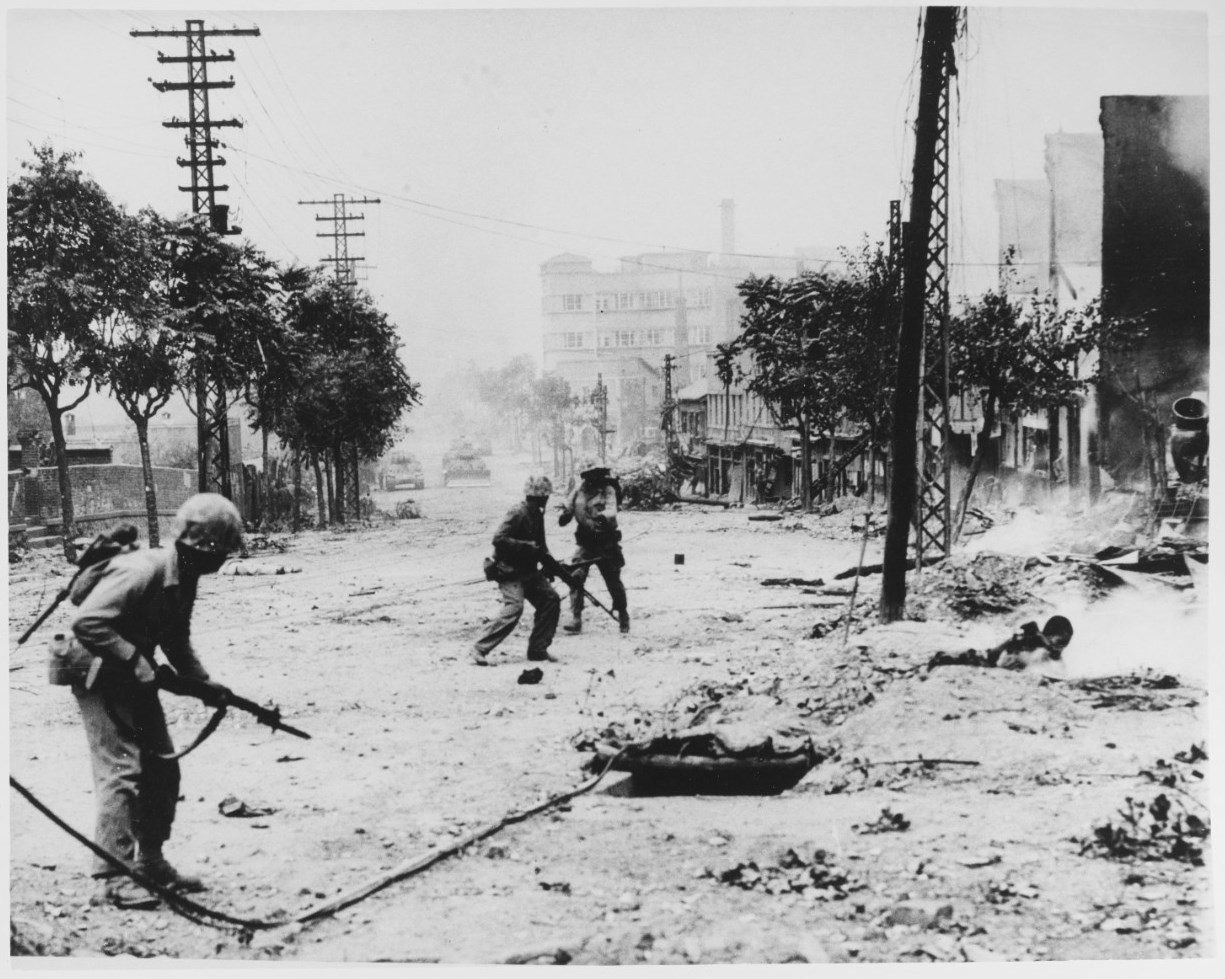
U.S. Marines engaged in urban warfare in Seoul

Within a few minutes after the 5th Marines received the order for the night attack, a KPA force of approximately 200 men struck its 3rd Battalion. Fighting continued until 04:45 when the battalion repulsed the North Koreans. Meanwhile, regimental patrols sent south and southeast to establish contact with the 1st Marines failed to do so. Likewise, patrols of the 7th Marines from the north failed to establish contact with the 5th Marines. Except for its patrols, the 5th Marines did not move forward during the night from its evening positions.

After receiving the order for the night attack, Puller ordered the 1st Marines to prepare to attack at 01:45 after a 15-minute artillery preparation. A patrol from the 3rd Battalion moved out at the conclusion of this preparation and a short distance away encountered a large KPA force preparing to counterattack. Some members of the patrol escaped and gave the alarm. The battalion at 01:53 sent a flash message to Puller that an enemy tank-led force was on the point of attacking it. Puller thereupon ordered a second 15-minute artillery barrage to be fired directly in front of the 3rd Battalion, the Marine attack to follow that. This second barrage, together with mortar, tank, and automatic fire caught an estimated force of 700 KPA, supported by 12 tanks, two self-propelled guns and 120-mm. mortar fire, attacking straight down the main boulevard, and decimated it. The lead enemy tank struck a mine at a Marine street block and bazookas destroyed others. Burning buildings illuminated the street scene in front of the 3rd Battalion. The KPA attack continued until daylight although it became progressively weaker. After daylight the marines captured 83 prisoners, counted 250 dead and saw four tanks and two self-propelled guns knocked out in front of them.

Because of the KPA counterattack during the night and the lack of contact between its regiments, the Marine division did not launch a night attack as ordered. Its lines after daylight, 26 September, were substantially the same as they had been the evening before.

It appears that after the seizure of Namsan by the 32nd Infantry and the reduction of the hill defenses at the western edge of the city by the 5th Marines during the 25th, the North Korean commander in Seoul decided the city was doomed and began the withdrawal of certain units that evening while leaving others to fight desperate delaying actions. The aerial reports of enemy columns fleeing the city and Almond's conclusion that the North Koreans were evacuating Seoul were therefore not without foundation. The major KPA unit withdrawing at this time was the 18th Division which had fought south of the Han River in the Yongdungp'o area. On 24 September it had assembled in Seoul, and the next evening the approximately 5,000 men remaining in the division retreated northward on the Uijongbu road, headed for Ch'orwon. At the same time, to cover this withdrawal, the North Korean commander struck with desperate counterattacks at every point of American advance into the city. Against the 2nd Battalion, 32nd Infantry, on Namsan he struck with one battalion and at other elements of the regiment eastward with another battalion. The heavy counterattack against the 3rd Battalion, 1st Marines, he launched in reinforced battalion strength; while against the 3rd Battalion, 5th Marines, he sent a reinforced company.

After the KPA attacks died away with the coming of daylight on the 26th, the Marines launched their attack. In a day-long effort down Ma-Po Boulevard, the main road through the city the 2nd Battalion, 1st Marines, gained less than a mile, and very little at all after 14:00. Snipers fired from houses along the way and enemy soldiers manned barricades, making of each one a small battlefield. Buildings were heavily defended by machine guns and snipers, and on the boulevard the KPA had established a series of 8 feet (2.4 m)-high barricades of burlap bags, typically filled with sand, dirt, or rice. Located about 200–300 yards (180–270 m) apart, each major intersection of the city featured such a barricade, the approaches to which were laced with mines, and which were usually defended by a 45mm anti-tank gun and machine guns. Each had to be eliminated one at a time, and it took the Marines, on average, 45–60 minutes to clear each position. Edwin H. Simmons, a Major in 3rd Battalion, 5th Marines, likened the experience of his company's advance up the boulevard to "attacking up Pennsylvania Avenue towards the Capitol in Washington, D.C". He described the street as "once a busy, pleasant avenue lined with sycamores, groceries, wine, and tea shops".

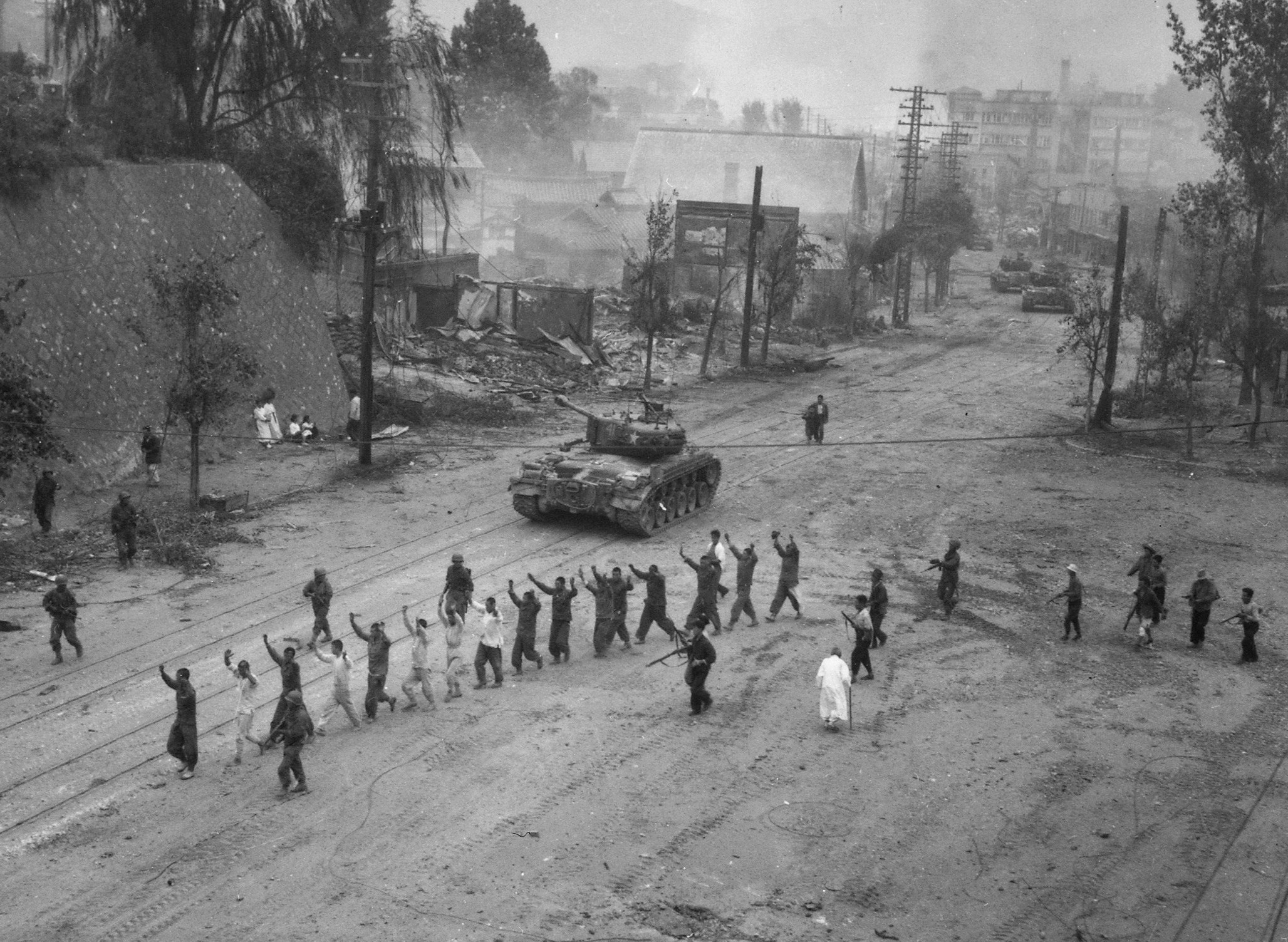
American M26 Pershing tanks in downtown Seoul, in the foreground, United Nations troops round up North Korean prisoners-of-war.

The 5th Marines had even stronger opposition in trying to advance from a spur of Hill 296 into the city and made only slight gains, but it did establish contact with the 1st Marines.

Just after noon, the Marine division brought Colonel Homer Litzenberg's 7th Marines into the fight for Seoul proper, directing it to seize the mountain pass north of the city, and to cut the highway running northeast out of Seoul for Uijongbu and Ch'orwon at a point 1 mile (1.6 km) northeast of the Capitol. The regiment's D Company turned down the Kaesong-Seoul highway toward the city, seeking to establish contact with the 5th Marines, but came under heavy enemy fire at 08:30 opposite Soedaemun Prison. The company suffered many casualties there and, unable to advance farther, withdrew to a road cut between Hills 296 and 338 where it established a perimeter defense. That afternoon two planes dropped ammunition and medical supplies to it. KPA fire hit both planes, and one crash-landed at Kimpo. Friendly tanks succeeded in reaching D Company's perimeter and carried out the wounded. At dusk on Tuesday, 26 September, X Corps' troops held approximately half the city.

About 20 hours earlier, just before midnight of the 25th, Almond had announced the liberation of Seoul, three months to the day after the North Koreans began the invasion. Almond apparently based his announcement on the air reports of North Korean evacuation of the city and the seizure of Namsan during the day. On the 26th, General Douglas MacArthur signed and released United Nations Command Communiqué 9 at 14:10 announcing the fall of Seoul. The communiqué said in part, "Seoul, the capital of the Republic of Korea, is again in friendly hands. United Nations forces, including the 17th Regiment of the ROK Army and elements of the U.S. 7th and 1st Marine Divisions, have completed the envelopment and seizure of the city." In subsequent communiqués MacArthur made no mention of further fighting in Seoul, confining comment to combat operations in the Suwon area south of the city.

On 27 September, the battle of the barricades in Seoul continued. In the middle part of Seoul the barricades stretched across the streets from side to side and were usually placed at intersections. Mostly they were chest-high and made of rice and fiber bags filled with earth. From behind them and at their sides KPA soldiers fired antitank guns and swept the streets with machine gun fire. Other soldiers were posted in adjacent buildings. Antitank mines belted the streets in front of the barricades.

The Marine attack settled into a routine for reducing the barricades. Navy and Marine planes would rocket and strafe them, mortarmen and infantry would set up a base of fire covering the engineers while they exploded the mines, two or three Pershing tanks would advance to the barricade, take it under fire destroying antitank guns and automatic weapons, and breach it. Occasionally, flame-throwing tanks rumbled up to stubbornly held positions and helped reduce the barrier. Infantry accompanying and following the tanks gave them protection, destroyed snipers, and cleared the area. A single barricade might hold up a battalion advance as much as an hour.

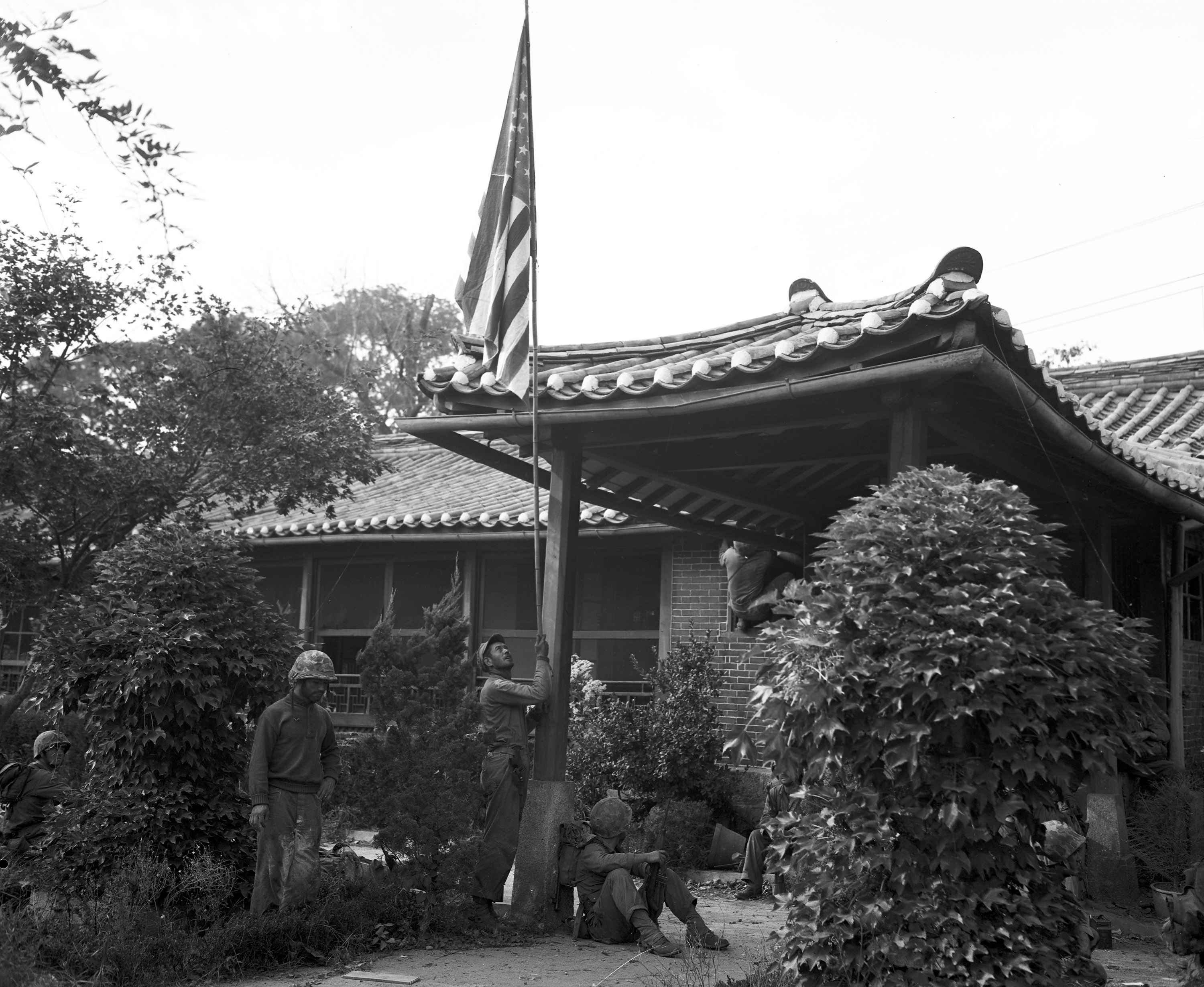
Raising the US flag at the US Embassy

On the 27th, the 2nd Battalion, 1st Marines, drove down Ma-Po Boulevard into the heart of the city, capturing the French Embassy and raising the American flag over it just before 11:00. Richard J. H. Johnston, a correspondent for the New York Times who had lived in Seoul for four years, guided Captain Charles D. Frederick and his E Company men in the afternoon to the Soviet Embassy, where they pulled down the Red flag and raised the American at 15:30. They then crossed over to the adjacent American Embassy and raised the American flag over it seven minutes later. North Korean machine gunners at the gate of the American Embassy surrendered without firing. The 1st Battalion meanwhile captured the railroad station in the morning in fairly heavy action and then encountered a series of strongly defended barricades along the main thoroughfare leading northward into the center of the city. ROK Marines followed the 1st Battalion, mopping up behind it.

In the northwestern part of the city, the 5th Marines advanced on the 27th against relatively light resistance. Overnight the opposition of the previous day had largely vanished. On the regimental north flank, E Company without opposition entered Soedaemun Prison. Earlier a tank-led force from the 7th Marines had relieved D Company in its perimeter just beyond the prison. A Korean civilian informed troops of E Company, 5th Marines, that about five days earlier approximately 400 American prisoners held in the prison had been removed and taken northward. At midafternoon, the 5th Marines established contact with the 7th Marines in the northwest corner of Seoul.

The main axis of attack of the 5th Marine Regiment, however, was farther south. There the 3rd Battalion secured the Seoul Middle School (37.570°N 126.970°E) and Hill 79 just to the north of it by 10:15, and reorganized for the attack toward the Capitol, its major objective. From the Seoul Middle School the battalion advanced due east to Kwang Who Moon Circle, where a memorial shrine stood. From behind a barricade at this intersection the North Koreans put up their last organized resistance in the heart of the city. A flame-throwing tank clanked across the large circular plaza and ended this resistance.

From Kwang Who Moon Circle a broad and, in peacetime, imposingly beautiful, modern boulevard also named Kwang Who Moon runs north 0.5 miles (0.80 km), terminating in front of the Capitol. After the tanks had reduced the barricade at Kwang Who Moon Circle, G Company, 5th Marines, advanced without opposition down the boulevard to the Capitol. The company had possession of the building at 15:08, and immediately thereafter struck the North Korean flags flying from the flag poles on either side of the Court of Lions in front of the building and raised in their place the American flag.

The breakthrough to the Capitol apparently caught some North Korean officials or stragglers there by surprise, compelling a hasty getaway, for upon entering the troops found hot food ready for eating. The battalion cleared the area of snipers and stragglers during the afternoon, and that night the 3rd Battalion established its command post in the building.

During that morning, the 1st Battalion, 5th Marines, following behind the 3rd Battalion, turned off to the left after reaching the Seoul Middle School and attacked north to Hill 338, a key terrain feature a mile northwest of the Capitol. At 19:00 it secured the hill which dominated the Seoul-Pyongyang highway at the northwest corner of the city. Except for scattered snipers and stragglers, the last defenders of Seoul withdrew from the city that night.

The next day, 28 September, although its 1st Battalion had to contend with many mines, the 1st Marines swept through the northeast corner of Seoul against only light resistance to complete its occupation. By evening the regiment had taken Hills 132 and 133, at the northeast edge of Seoul, dominating the Seoul-Uijongbu-Ch'orwon highway. A mile farther north, the KPA held the 7th Marines in check short of its objective, Hill 224 (37.623°N 127.007°E) the key terrain feature on the other, west, side of the highway.

KPA resistance in Seoul had ended, the North Korean forces were withdrawing northward in the direction of Uijongbu just 90 days after they had victoriously entered the city.

== Aftermath ==
=== Restoration of the South Korean government ===
On 23 September MacArthur sent a message to the Joint Chiefs of Staff in Washington saying in part, "I plan to return President Rhee, his cabinet, senior members of the legislature, the U.N. Commission and perhaps others of similar official category to domicile in Seoul as soon as conditions there are sufficiently stable to permit reasonable security." The combat situation in Seoul did not permit final plans for the ceremony until 27 and 28 September.

MacArthur and his party arrived at Kimpo Airfield from Tokyo at 10:00, 29 September. Almond and other high-ranking officers met the party and proceeded with it to Seoul. During the night bulldozers had worked to clear the main streets of barricades and the litter of battle. Cheering throngs of South Koreans assembled and lined the streets in the shell-torn, burning city. The 3rd Battalion, 1st Marines, provided security along the route from the Han River pontoon bridge; the 3rd Battalion, 5th Marines, provided security around the Capitol.

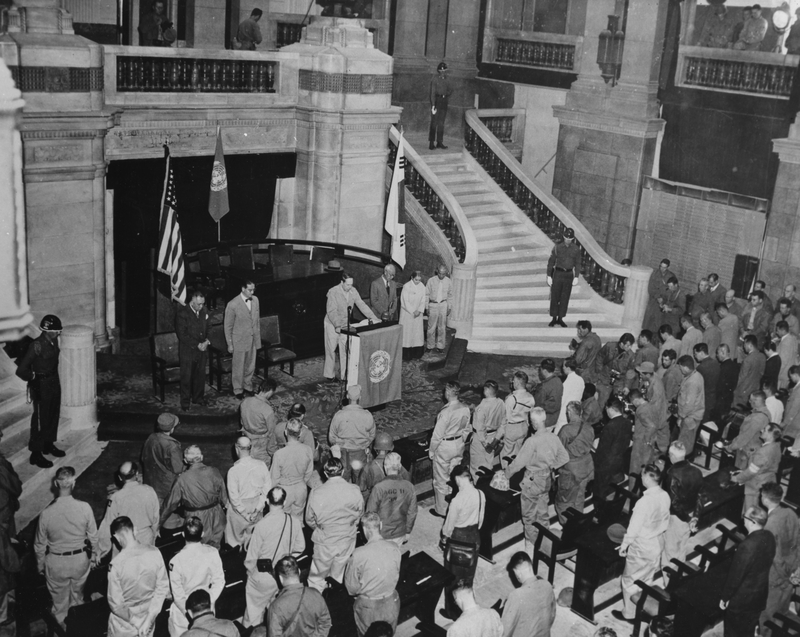
General MacArthur speaks during the ceremony restoring the Capitol to the Republic of Korea

The National Assembly Hall in the Capitol was packed with selected South Korean officials and citizens and representatives of the combat units that had liberated Seoul. At 12:00, MacArthur came into the chamber with Rhee and proceeded to the dais where important officers and officials were seated, including General Walton Walker and a few Eighth Army officers who had flown to Seoul on MacArthur's invitation. MacArthur began forthwith to deliver his short address in sonorous voice and unhurried words:

Mr. President By the grace of a merciful Providence our forces fighting under the standard of that greatest hope and inspiration of mankind, the United Nations, have liberated this ancient capital city... On behalf of the United Nations Command I am happy to restore to you, Mr. President, the seat of your government that from it you may better fulfill your constitutional responsibilities.

The assemblage then joined MacArthur in reciting the Lord's Prayer. While MacArthur spoke slivers of glass fell from the partially shattered glass-paneled roof. Rhee rose to express the gratitude of the Republic of Korea for the liberation of its capital city, he departed from his prepared text and stretching out his hands, clenching and unclenching them, spoke to that part of the audience made up of American soldiers, "How can I ever explain to you my own undying gratitude and that of the Korean people?" The short ceremony over, MacArthur left at once for Kimpo Airfield and at 13:35 departed for Tokyo.

The capture of Seoul led to a series of exchanges between officials of the United States Government and MacArthur. President Harry S. Truman sent a message which said in part, "Few operations in military history can match either the delaying action where you traded space for time in which to build up your forces, or the brilliant maneuver which has now resulted in the liberation of Seoul." From the Joint Chiefs of Staff MacArthur received a message which read in part, "Your transition from defensive to offensive operations was magnificently planned, timed, and executed.... We remain completely confident that the great task entrusted to you by the United Nations will be carried to a successful conclusion."

=== Actions south of Seoul ===
While the greater part of X Corps concentrated its strength before Seoul and was preoccupied with its capture, the blocking force of the 31st Infantry Regiment, 7th Division, 30 miles (48 km) below the city, was not without action. On 23 September, when Ovenshine's 31st Infantry Regiment assumed responsibility for Suwon and Suwon Airfield, its mission was to clear the enemy from Suwon and to seize and hold the high ground south of the airfield. Prisoners captured in Suwon by the Reconnaissance Company reported that a regiment of the 105th Armored Division was in Choch'iwon on the 18th, only 50 miles (80 km) to the south, and on its way north to help the Seoul garrison. If this was true, it had to be assumed that this armored force must be approaching the 31st Infantry positions. Accordingly, the regiment kept the area south of Suwon under close observation.

During the night of 24 September, the 2nd Battalion, 31st Infantry, on high ground (Hill 142) 2 miles (3.2 km) south of Suwon Airfield came under attack an hour before midnight, and KPA armor struck the battalion's left flank resting on the Suwon-Osan highway. The battalion, with the supporting artillery fire of the 57th Field Artillery Battalion and of B Battery, 15th Field Artillery Battalion, repulsed the attack and knocked out four T-34 tanks. The next day the 92nd Field Artillery Battalion moved to Suwon to strengthen the forces there. Aerial reconnaissance on the 25th and 26th reported KPA entrenchments in the hills dominating both sides of the highway and rail line just north of Osan, 8–10 miles (13–16 km) south of Suwon and 2–3 miles (3.2–4.8 km) south of the American position.

On the 26th, Ovenshine ordered the 2nd Battalion to attack and seize the high ground held by the North Koreans near Osan. This included the positions where Task Force Smith had met and delayed the North Koreans briefly on 5 July in the first American ground action of the war. The 3rd Battalion, less I Company, stood ready to reinforce the 2nd Battalion. Ovenshine started the 2nd Battalion Task Force - composed of E, F and part of G Companies and two platoons of tanks on a wide, flanking movement southeastwardly toward Osan to attack the enemy positions from the rear. At the same time, he formed another attack force composed of elements of G and H Companies, and A Company, 73rd Tank Battalion, to attack south along the highway.

By daylight of the 27th, the flanking force arrived at Osan. A bazooka team destroyed a KPA tank that fired on the column. The force then moved through Osan and engaged the KPA on the hills northward. Attacking down the road simultaneously from the north, the second force was stopped by strong KPA tank, antitank gun, mortar, and small arms fire. Fighting continued throughout the clear, warm autumn day, with the 31st Infantry making only small gains. Prisoners captured in the action said that the force was indeed from the 105th Armored Division. While its ground gains were slight, the 31st Infantry claimed the destruction or immobilization of 14 tanks, six antitank guns, and several mortars, and the infliction of 300 casualties. The 31st Infantry's two attack forces dug in that night around Hill 113 where the main enemy force was concentrated.

On the morning of the 28th, the American infantry withdrew at 08:30 almost 1 mile (1.6 km) westward from their overnight positions to make sure that they would not suffer casualties from air strikes scheduled to come in against Hills 113 and 92. Beginning at noon and continuing for 50 minutes, seven Navy planes attacked both hills and the railroad tunnel area just east of Hill 92, using napalm extensively. When the air strikes ended, the 57th and 92nd Field Artillery Battalions pounded the hills for 30 minutes, the Heavy Mortar Company joining in the preparation. When it ended, K and L Companies attacked eastward against Hill 113. By 15:15 they had secured the hill against only light resistance, and from there L Company attacked across the saddle to Hill 92, 600 yards (550 m) away, supported by K Company fire from Hill 113. An hour later the 31st Infantry held both hills-taken without a single casualty to itself. Surviving KPA troops withdrew eastward. The road between Suwon and Osan was open. The next day the 31st Infantry buried more than 100 KPA dead on the captured positions.

While the 31st Infantry was clearing the Osan highway, the 2nd Battalion, 17th Infantry Regiment, 7th Division, fought its first battle of the war on 29 September in a heavy fire fight against a KPA force at the southeast side of Seoul. In this action, which continued after dark, the battalion suffered 79 casualties. That night the 48th Field Artillery Battalion laid down a barrage which effectively broke up an attempted enemy counterattack. The North Koreans reportedly suffered more than 400 killed.

On 30 September the 1st Marine Division assumed responsibility for the 32nd Infantry zone in Seoul and that unit then crossed back to the south side of the Han River.

After the capture of Seoul, the 1st Marine Division cleared KPA troops from the northern environs of the city. On 1 October, elements of the 5th Marines patrolled the Pyongyang highway as far as Munsan and the Imjin River. They encountered only scattered individual enemy riflemen except in the vicinity of Munsan. The 7th Marines, at the same time, advanced up the Uijongbu road north of the city against almost no resistance, hampered only by mines. But the next day, 2 October, the regiment made virtually no gains. Three battalions of the KPA 31st Regiment, 31st Division, well dug-in on either side of the highway, stopped the regiment in hard fighting 3 miles (4.8 km) south of Uijongbu in the vicinity of Nuwon-ni. There high mountains closing in on either side of the highway created a natural fortress. During the night, the KPA blocking force withdrew northward, and on 3 October tanks led the 2nd Battalion into Uijongbu in the afternoon. Marine and Navy air strikes had completely destroyed the town. The 7th Marines occupied the high ground just north of Uijongbu and consolidated its position around the town for the night. The fighting of 2-3 October in front of Uijongbu was the last organized resistance the 1st Marine Division encountered in the Inchon-Seoul operation.

=== Casualties ===
The Seoul operation disclosed that the preinvasion estimate of 5,000 organized troops in the city was low and that, instead, there were approximately 8,000 such troops in Seoul and 5,000 more in the Yongdungp'o area. Reinforcements after the landing at Inchon brought the total KPA troops in Seoul to at least 20,000 and there were at least 10,000 KPA soldiers between the Han River and Suwon. Below Suwon in the Osan area there were from 2,000 to 3,000 more. It appears that altogether somewhat more than 30,000 North Korean troops entered battle in the Inchon-Suwon-Seoul area, and that there were perhaps 10,000 more miscellaneous soldiers in the vicinity, uncommitted or who arrived too late to be used. X Corps reported 7,000 North Korean prisoners taken in the fighting and estimated enemy troops killed at 14,000.

The 1st Marine Division did not lose a single tank to enemy tank action in the Seoul operation but lost several to enemy infantry action. An accurate count of KPA tanks destroyed in the X Corps operation is hard to make, but it appears that approximately 45 to 50 were destroyed in the Inchon-Yongdungp'o-Seoul area and about ten to 15 more in the Suwon-Osan area, or about 60 altogether. The North Koreans lost a great amount of other military equipment in the Seoul operation. The 1st Marine Division alone reported that it had destroyed or captured 23 120-mm. mortars, 19 45-mm. antitank guns, 56 heavy machine guns, 337 light and submachine guns, 59 14.5 antitank rifles, and 7,543 rifles.

The Inchon-Seoul victory cost the United Nations forces approximately 3,500 casualties. The 7th Infantry Division suffered 572 battle casualties, including 106 killed, 409 wounded and 57 missing in action. Of the total, 166 were ROKA soldiers integrated into the division. Within the division, the 32nd Regiment lost 66 killed, 272 wounded and 47 missing. The heaviest losses in X Corps occurred in the 1st Marine Division which suffered total casualties of 2,383 men - 364 killed, 53 who died of wounds, 1,961 wounded and five missing. Marine losses were heaviest for the six days from 21 to 27 September. During that time it suffered 1,482 battle casualties, the greatest single day's loss being 285 on 24 September.

After the battle, South Korean police executed citizens and their families who were suspected communist sympathizers in what is known as the Goyang Geumjeong Cave and Namyangju massacres.

== See also ==
- Eugene A. Obregon, US Marine posthumously awarded the Medal of Honor for shielding a fellow Marine during the battle
- First Battle of Seoul
- Third Battle of Seoul
- Operation Ripper (Fourth Battle of Seoul)
