= 78th Independent Infantry Regiment (North Korea) =

The 78th Independent Infantry Regiment(제78독립보병련대) was a military formation of the Korean People's Army during the 20th Century.

Along with the 25th Infantry Brigade, it defended both the military and topographic crests leading from Inchon to Seoul after the Inchon landing.

== See also ==
- 766th Independent Infantry Regiment
