= Barr Memorial Library =

Library in Fort Knox, Kentucky

Coordinates: 37°53′25″N 85°57′16″W

Barr Memorial Library, named after Major General David Goodwin Barr, is a part of the Community Recreation Division of Fort Knox’s Directorate of Family, Moral, Welfare and Recreation (MWR). The services the library provides are available to soldiers and their families, Department of Defense civilian employees, members of the Army National Guard, members of the Army Reserve, on-post students, retired military personnel, and contractors.

In 2014, it was named Federal Library of the year.

== Mission statement ==
Barr Memorial Library's primary goal is to provide military personnel and family members a wide variety of services that are designed to help members by delivering programs that are relevant to the community.

The library supports the core values of loyalty, respect, duty, selfless service, honor, integrity, and personal courage and strives to integrate these values into the services it provides to community members.

== The Library’s Namesake ==
Major General David Goodwin Barr, the library's namesake, was born on June 16, 1895. He was commissioned a second lieutenant in 1917, during World War 1. Barr would later serve as an officer in the United States Army in World War II. He served in the United States Army for over 30 years.

Barr was stationed in Fort Knox frequently during his time in the Army. In 1930, he became Adjutant of the Mechanized Force and moved to then Camp Knox. Ten years later, Barr moved back to Fort Knox, and in 1942 he became the Chief of Staff of the Armored Forces. After serving in the Korean War, he was stationed at Fort Knox again and took command of the Armored Center until he was physically retired due to illness in 1952.

His services awards include the Distinguished Service Cross, the Legion of Merit and Distinguished Flying Cross, three Distinguished Service Medals, and two Silver Stars. Barr died on September 26, 1970, and is buried in Arlington National Cemetery.

== Location ==
The library is located on Fort Knox, a military installation in central Kentucky in between Elizabethtown and Louisville. It is on West Spearhead Division Avenue, near the Main Post Chapel and the Fort Knox Visitors Center.

== Services ==
Barr Memorial Library has a wide variety of services and activities to participate in every month that are available for the members of the Fort Knox community. In 2014, the library offered 290 programs that were attended by more than 13,500 participants.

== Awards ==
In 2014, Barr Memorial Library was named the Federal Library/ Information Center of the Year. The library was recognized because of their staff's willingness to adopt technology and innovative thinking for its nearly 200,000 patrons. The award strives to honor federal libraries that satisfy the information needs of the government, the American public, and the business and academic communities.

In 2016, Michael Steinmacher, the director of Barr Memorial Library, was named Federal Librarian of the Year.
