= 18th Division (North Korea) =

The 18th Division (Korean: 조선인민군 륙군 제18사단) was a military formation of the Korean People's Army during the 20th Century.

== History ==
It fought in the First Battle of Seoul. After a group of U.S. Marines landed their defences on Seoul's west side and entered the city on 25 September, the NKPA's 18th Division commander had decided that the battle was lost and began withdrawing his units, which had been fighting in the Yeongdeungpo District area, south of the Han River.
