= David G. Barr =

American Army general (1895–1970)

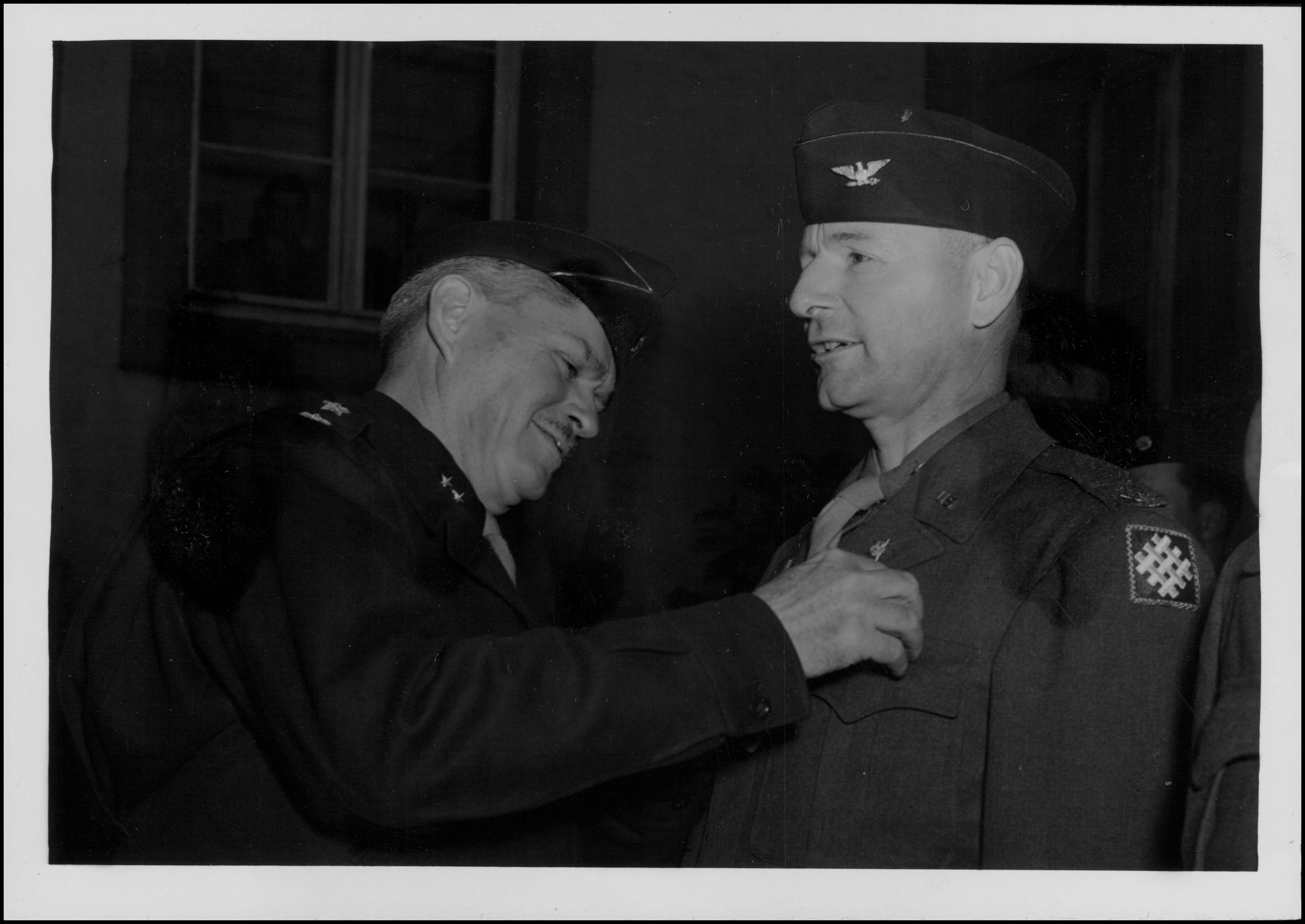
- Barr (left) presents Colonel David C. Erksine with the Bronze Star Medal (1945)
- Born: June 16, 1895; Nanafalia, Alabama, U.S.
- Died: September 26, 1970 (aged 75); Falls Church, Virginia, U.S.
- Burial place: Arlington National Cemetery
- Spouse: Vivian Louise Bell Barr
- Military career
- Allegiance: United States
- Branch: United States Army
- Service years: 1917–1952
- Rank: Major General
- Units: Armor Force; 6th Army Group; Army Ground Forces
- Commands: U.S. Army Armor School; 7th Infantry Division; Army Advisory Group, Nanking
- Conflicts: World War I; World War II; Chinese Civil War; Korean War; Battle of Inchon; Battle of the Chosin Reservoir
- Awards: Distinguished Service Cross; Distinguished Service Medal (3); Silver Star (2); Legion of Merit; Distinguished Flying Cross; Air Medal (4)

David Goodwin Barr (June 16, 1895 – September 26, 1970) was a US Army major general who took part in World War I, World War II, the Chinese Civil War and the Korean War. Barr thought poorly of the Republic of China and often came into conflict with Chinese leader Chiang Kai-shek. He was a general in the Korean War and was awarded the Distinguished Service Cross. He led the 7th Infantry Division and was defeated by Chinese Communist troops in the Battle of Chosin Reservoir. Later, he was removed from his post by Matthew Ridgway. Following the war, he was appointed the commandant of United States Army Armor School.

== Biography ==
Barr was born in Nanafalia, Alabama on June 16, 1895. He attended Alabama Presbyterian College for three years before leaving to enlist in the United States Army Reserve during World War I. He was commissioned as a second lieutenant of infantry in the organized reserve corps on November 27, 1917 and immediately called to active duty in the 1st Infantry Division. Barr earned the Silver Star while serving in France. On September 15, 1920, he accepted a commission in the regular army.

Barr graduated from the Army Infantry School in 1921, the Army Tank School in 1924 and the French Tank School near Versailles in 1927, having been assigned to the office of the military attaché in Paris from 1926 to 1927. Returning to the United States, he graduated from the Command and General Staff School in June 1936 and the Army War College in June 1939.

Barr was promoted to brigadier general in June 1942 and major general in February 1944. He received the Legion of Merit and two awards of the Army Distinguished Service Medal while serving as a headquarters staff officer during World War II. Barr was also made a commander of the Legion of Honour by France.

In 1948, Barr became chief of the Army Advisory Group in China. In January 1949, he warned Secretary of Defense James Forrestal that U.S. arms shipments to Chiang's troops in China were being intercepted by the Communist forces. In April 1949, Barr gave secret testimony before the House Foreign Affairs Committee which predicted the imminent victory of the Chinese Communist forces under Mao Tse-tung. In May 1949, he assumed command of the 7th Infantry Division in Japan.

In addition to the Distinguished Service Cross, his combat service during the Korean War earned him a third award of the Distinguished Service Medal, a second award of the Silver Star, a Distinguished Flying Cross and four Air Medals.

Barr retired from active duty on February 29, 1952.

== Family and later life ==
On November 5, 1924, Barr married Vivian Louise Bell. They had two daughters, Virginia Lane and Patricia Bell.

Both daughters married army officers. Patricia Barr Crowe earned a Ph.D. degree in clinical psychology at George Washington University while raising five children. In all, David and Louise Barr had eleven grandchildren.

After retirement, Barr lived with his wife in Arlington County, Virginia. He died at a nursing home in Falls Church, Virginia on September 26, 1970. David and Louise Barr are buried at Arlington National Cemetery.

== See also ==
Barr Memorial Library at Fort Knox, Kentucky is named after him.
