= 25th Infantry Brigade (North Korea) =

The so called 25th Infantry Brigade (Korean: 제25교육여단; lit. '25th training brigade'), was a military formation of the Korean People's Army during the 20th Century.

Formed in August at Chorwon, it had begun moving to Seoul on the day of the Inchon landing, with most of the unit arriving in the city on September 19, 1950. The brigade numbered about twenty-five hundred men and probably consisted of two infantry battalions, four heavy machine gun battalions, an engineer battalion, a 76-mm artillery battalion, a 120-mm mortar battalion, and miscellaneous service troops. Along with the 78th Independent Infantry Regiment, it defended both the military and topographic crests leading from Inchon to Seoul.
