= 2009 North Korean nuclear test =

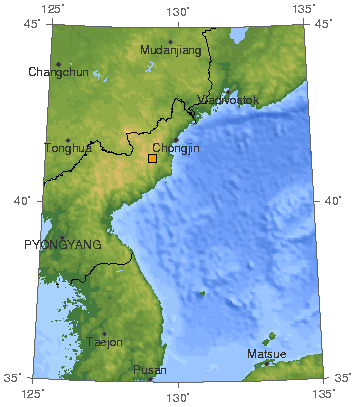
- Graphic from the United States Geological Survey showing the location of seismic activity at the time of the test

Information
- Country: North Korea
- Test site: 41.306°N 129.029°E, Punggye-ri Nuclear Test Site, Kilju County.
- Period: 09:54:43, 25 May 2009 KST
- Number of tests: 1
- Test type: Underground
- Device type: Fission
- Max. yield: 2.4 kilotons of TNT (10 TJ) (Comprehensive Test Ban Treaty Organization Preparatory Commission); 2.35 kt (9.8 TJ) (Estimation from Chinese academics); 5.1–8.9 kt (21–37 TJ) (Estimations from University of Science and Technology of China); 5.4 kt (23 TJ) (Federal Institute for Geosciences and Natural Resources estimates in Jan 2016), which was revised from earlier estimates at 13 kt (54 TJ) in 2013; 10–20 kt (42–84 TJ) (Russian estimates); 1–20 kt (4.2–83.7 TJ) (South Korea Defense Minister estimates); 3–8 kt (13–33 TJ) (Analyst Martin Kalinowski at the University of Hamburg); 2–6 kt (8.4–25.1 TJ), but likely less than 4 kt (17 TJ) (Hans M. Kristensen of the Federation of American Scientists)

Test chronology

Location of North Korea's nuclear tests
1: 2006; 2: 2009; 3: 2013; 4: 2016-01; 5: 2016-09; 6: 2017;
V

The 2009 North Korean nuclear test was the underground detonation of a nuclear device conducted on Monday, 25 May 2009 by North Korea. This was its second nuclear test, the first test having taken place in October 2006. Following the nuclear test, Pyongyang also conducted several missile tests. A scientific paper later estimated the yield as 2.35 kilotons.

The test was nearly universally condemned by the international community. Following the test, the United Nations Security Council passed Resolution 1874 condemning the test and tightening sanctions on the country.

It was widely believed that the test was conducted as a result of the succession crisis in the country. After Kim Jong Il suffered a stroke in the summer of 2008, arrangements were made for his third son, Kim Jong Un, to take power upon his death. It is believed the North Koreans conducted the nuclear test to show that, even in a time of possible weakness, it did not intend to give up its nuclear weapons program.

== Background ==
North Korea (officially the Democratic People's Republic of Korea, or DPRK) had threatened to conduct a second nuclear test in protest after the United Nations Security Council adopted a presidential statement condemning the country after it launched a rocket, which it claimed was carrying the Kwangmyŏngsŏng-2 satellite, on 5 April 2009. The launch was condemned by several nations, describing it as an intercontinental ballistic missile test.

The test occurred shortly after North Korea announced that it possessed miniaturized nuclear warheads for medium-range missiles and that it had been recognized by analysts as a fully fledged nuclear power.

In June 2009, after it was announced that Kim Jong Un was the intended successor of North Korean leader Kim Jong Il, U.S. government analysts speculated that the purpose of the nuclear test was to establish North Korea as a nuclear power within Kim Jong Il's lifetime.

== North Korean statements ==
Without citing a specific time, Pyongyang notified both Washington, D.C. and Beijing of the test about an hour before the actual detonation, which occurred around 10:00 Korea Standard Time (KST) Monday; the U.S. State Department promptly contacted the four other six-party talks members.

The state-run Korean Central News Agency (KCNA) released an announcement claiming, in part, that:

The Democratic People's Republic of Korea successfully conducted one more underground nuclear test on May 25 as part of the measures to bolster up its nuclear deterrent for self-defence in every way as requested by its scientists and technicians. The current nuclear test was safely conducted on a new higher level in terms of its explosive power and technology of its control and the results of the test helped satisfactorily settle the scientific and technological problems arising in further increasing the power of nuclear weapons and steadily developing nuclear technology.

This was interpreted as referring to the disputes over the low yield of the 2006 test.

== Seismic activity ==
South Korea and Japan reported seismic activity at 09:50 KST (00:50 UTC). The United States Geological Survey reported a magnitude 4.7 earthquake at a depth of zero and put the center of the tremor about 70 kilometres (43 mi) northwest of Kimchaek and 375 kilometres (233 mi) northeast of Pyongyang, within a few kilometres of the country's 2006 nuclear test site. The Japan Meteorological Agency measured the seismic activity at magnitude 5.3. The Korea Institute of Geoscience and Mineral Resources reported seismic activity in the same area but far stronger than in 2006.

The Russian Defence Ministry confirmed it had detected a nuclear detonation in North Korea and was analysing the data to determine the yield. Geophysical Service of the Russian Academy of Sciences has registered underground nuclear explosion conducted in North Korea on 25 May 2009. Registration time of this explosion was 0:54 am. GMT (4:54 a.m. Moscow time) with magnitude 5.0.

In China, tremors were felt in the prefecture of Yanbian, which borders North Korea, and forced students in some local schools to be evacuated. The test is believed to have taken place at Mantapsan in the vicinity of P'unggyeri (풍계리), which was the site of the nuclear test held in 2006.

== Analysis of test ==
=== Yield ===
Analysts have generally agreed that the nuclear test was successful, despite uncertainty of the exact yield.

The U.S. intelligence community assessed that North Korea "probably" had conducted a nuclear test with a yield of "a few kilotons".

The Comprehensive Test Ban Treaty Organization Preparatory Commission assessed the yield at only slightly larger than the 2006 test, which was one kiloton. Based on readings from 23 seismic stations, the Preparatory Commission estimated the blast to have a seismic magnitude of 4.52, corresponding to an explosive yield of 2.4 kilotons, compared to a seismic magnitude of 4.1, corresponding to a yield of 0.8 kilotons, for the 2006 blast.

Russia placed the yield of the test significantly higher at 10 to 20 kilotons. This was approximately the yield of the Fat Man and Trinity bombs developed by the United States during World War II. However, the Russians had also previously estimated a far higher yield of 5 to 10 kilotons when other sources estimated a yield of 0.5 to 0.9 kilotons in the 2006 test as well.

Defense Minister Lee Sang-Hee of South Korea said that more data were needed but that the yield might be between 1 and 20 kilotons.

Analyst Martin Kalinowski at the University of Hamburg estimated the yield at being from 3 to 8 kilotons, still a very successful test when compared with the 2006 test.

Hans M. Kristensen of the Federation of American Scientists cautioned that "early news media reports about a 'Hiroshima-size' nuclear explosion seem to be overblown". The Bulletin of the Atomic Scientists asserted that the blast was more powerful than the 2006 test, though put the yield between 2 and 6 kilotons, but likely less than 4 kilotons and far short of a Hiroshima-type device. The group concluded that the bomb failed to detonate correctly, but even so the potential of this weapon should not be dismissed.

However, after the subsequent nuclear test in 2013, the Federal Institute for Geosciences and Natural Resources, a state-run geology research institute in Germany, estimated the yield ranging from a minimum of 5 kilotons to the maximum of 12 kilotons and the 2006 test ranging from minimum of 700 tons to the maximum of 2 kilotons instead with relevant statistics.

Similarly, the University of Science and Technology of China has estimated the yield of this test to be at 7kT with an error margin of 1.9kT (5.1kT to 8.9kT) while presenting their estimation for the nuclear test on 9 September 2016.

=== Lack of radionuclide confirmation ===
In June 2009, the Preparatory Commission for the Comprehensive Nuclear-Test-Ban Treaty Organization (CTBTO) announced that no radionuclides had been detected that could be associated with the 25 May event. At the time of the test, the CTBTO global network included 40 radionuclide sampling stations. In addition, the United States reported that no radionuclides were detected by aircraft over the Sea of Japan (East Sea of Korea), and South Korea also reported that no radionuclides were detected. By contrast, radionuclides were detected in at least two locations after the 2006 event. Lack of detection does not mean that the event was non-nuclear: it is reasonable for a nuclear test with this yield, buried deep enough in the appropriate rock, to not yield remotely detectable radionuclides, but it makes it more difficult to prove whether the test was nuclear.

== Missile tests ==
On the same day, North Korea also conducted short-range surface-to-air missile tests. The number of fired missiles was first reported as three, but corrected to two by the South Korean defense ministry on 27 May 2009. The first missile had a range of 130 km (81 mi). The South Korean news agency Yonhap cited military officials as saying that the launches seemed to be aimed at keeping U.S. and Japanese surveillance planes away from the site.

On 26 May 2009, South Korea's Yonhap news agency reported, citing officials, that North Korea fired three more short-range missiles off an east-coast base, one ground-to-ship missile and one surface-to-air missile. The move came as UN diplomats began work on a resolution to punish North Korea for its underground nuclear test.

By 27 May 2009, at least five short range missiles were launched by North Korea. A military spokesman quoted by official media said that North Korea could no longer guarantee the safety of shipping off its west coast, suggesting a missile could also be fired in that direction.

Another short-range missile was fired off North Korea's east coast on 28 May 2009.

On 29 May 2009, U.S. officials said that satellite photos revealed vehicle activity at two sites in North Korea suggesting that North Korean military might be preparing to launch a long-range ballistic missile. This was reaffirmed on 1 June 2009 by Defense Secretary Robert M. Gates who said at a news conference with his Philippine counterpart during a brief visit to Manila "We have seen some signs that they may be doing something with another Taepodong-2 missile, but at this point it's not clear what they're doing".

Yonhap news agency reported on 2 June 2009 that North Korea was readying as many as three medium-range missiles (according to some analysts, Rodong missiles) at a missile base in Anbyon region, Gangwon Province, northeast of the capital of Pyongyang. In addition, a South Korean defence ministry spokesman said that signs that North Korea was preparing to fire an intercontinental ballistic missile (ICBM) had been detected. verifying US defense officials' reports and Defense Secretary Robert M. Gates's statement made on 1 June. North Korea apparently has moved the ICBM to a new base in Dongchang-ri along its west coast and a launch could take place in one or two weeks, according to Yonhap.

== International reaction ==
The North Korean news agency KCNA confirmed the test as "successful". The agency also said the test was "aimed at strengthening its self-defense nuclear deterrent in every way". South Korea's Yonhap news agency reported citing KCNA that citizens of Pyongyang held a rally to celebrate the country's second successful nuclear test on 26 May.

In general the International reactions to the 2009 North Korean nuclear test have been almost uniformly negative.

=== Members of the six-party talks ===
- South Korea: President Lee Myung-bak called an emergency cabinet meeting. The decision was made to join the Proliferation Security Initiative, a move which the North has repeatedly warned would be construed as a declaration of war. The ROK-US Combined Forces Command raised its surveillance condition from WATCHCON3 (important indications of threat) to WATCHCON2 (vital indications of threat). President Lee Myung-bak made another statement at the beginning of the ASEAN-Republic of Korea Commemorative Summit saying "We will continue to work to have North Korea observe UN Security Council resolutions". On 27 May, North Korea's permanent military mission to the north–south joint security area reacted to S. Korea's decision to join the Proliferation Security Initiative saying it no longer is bound to the Korean War armistice and will militarily respond to any foreign attempt to inspect its ships.
- China: The Foreign Ministry released a statement: "The DPRK ignored universal opposition of the international community and once more conducted the nuclear test. The Chinese government is resolutely opposed to it". The statement also strongly demanded that North Korea "return to the tracks of the six-party talks".
- Japan: Japan said the test was "unacceptable" and a violation of UN Security Council resolutions. It was also considering tightening sanctions in response.
- Russia: The Russian Ministry of Foreign Affairs stated that "The latest steps of the DPRK escalate tensions in Northeast Asia and endanger regional security and stability" and violated UN Security Council Resolution 1718, but added that "We still think that the nuclear problem of the Korean Peninsula may be resolved only at the six-nation negotiations". Natalya Timakova, the press attaché to the Russian president, said Russia "is seriously concerned" about North Korea's nuclear test and that "Russian competent services express regret and voice serious concern about North Korea's nuclear test in the area adjacent to the Russian Federation".
- United States: The White House condemned the test, saying "North Korea is directly and recklessly challenging the international community. The danger posed by North Korea's threatening activities warrants action by the international community." President Barack Obama's official statement promised that North Korea would not find "international acceptance" unless it complied. He also said that the country's actions "pose a grave threat to the peace and stability of the world". Susan Rice, US ambassador to the UN, added that, "North Korea needs to understand that its actions have consequences" and that they would "pay a price for their action", in the form of further sanctions. Robert Gates, the US Defense Secretary, delivered a stark warning to North Korea, on 30 May 2009 "The policy of the United States has not changed," he said. "Our goal is complete and verifiable denuclearisation of the Korean peninsula, and we will not accept North Korea as a nuclear weapons state."

== Aftermath ==
News of the tests immediately affected South Korean markets, sending the main KOSPI share index down 4%, while the South Korean won dropped by 1% against the US$ on the day of the nuclear test, 25 May. The yen fell to 95.10 per dollar from its level of 94.78 on 22 May.

On 28 May, North Korea threatened to end the Korean War armistice, stating that "the Korean peninsula will go back to a state of war", whereupon the joint military command of South Korea and the United States increased its surveillance alert level from WATCHCON 3 to WATCHCON 2, the second-highest level of surveillance alert. However, the five-stage combat alert level remained at DEFCON 4, the second-lowest level. Russia undertook security measures in case the war of nerves on the Korean peninsula erupted into a nuclear war.

North Korea also threatened on 29 May to attack South Korean and US warships near its coast if its sovereignty were infringed. In Japan a policy debate ensued regarding strengthening its military up to and including the possibility of an independent pre-emptive strike capability and even nuclear armaments, subjects hitherto taboo.

On 30 May, the United Kingdom's Ministry of Defence confirmed that a VC10 tanker plane, which is used for air-to-air refueling, had been sent to Kadena Air Base in Okinawa, Japan to help support the investigations, led by the U.S. military, to determine the power of the nuclear explosion and the type of material that was used. A Ministry spokesman said: "Following the recent events in North Korea and to support the international community's efforts during this time of increased political tension, we can confirm that the UK is supporting in the associated verification efforts". On the same day, a U.S. F-22 fighter jet arrived on Kadena Air Base, the first of twelve F-22s and approximately 280 Langley Air Force Base Airmen from the 94th Fighter Squadron, along with members of the Virginia Air National Guard's 192nd Fighter Wing, that are being deployed to Kadena Air Base as part of a theatre security package.

U.S. Deputy Secretary of State Jim Steinberg accompanied by Stephen Bosworth, the U.S. special envoy on North Korea, led a U.S. delegation to Asia on 1 June 2009 to consult regional forces on how to respond to North Korea's latest nuclear test. The delegation also includes Stuart Levy, the Treasury under-secretary for terrorism and financial intelligence, and Admiral James Winnefeld of the Joint Chiefs of Staff.

Japan approved on 2 June 2009 plans for a satellite missile early warning system as part of a new space policy document, a year after Japan dropped a decades-old ban on military use of space with some ruling party lawmakers suggesting Japan should inspect North Korean ships, in the wake of reports that N. Korea was preparing to fire more mid-range missiles. On the same day, as a response to the increased activity of the N. Korean military and after reports that North Koreans have stepped up naval drills near the western sea border, the site of deadly skirmishes between the two Koreas in 1999 and 2002, South Korea deployed a high-speed naval vessel, the Yoon Youngha guided missile patrol boat, to the area and vowed to "punish" any attacking forces.

After the North Korean nuclear test the U.S. has approved the sale of a number of weapon systems to South Korea, including GBU-28 "bunker buster" bombs, SM-2 Standard surface-to-air Missiles and F-16 Block 32 Aircraft Upgrades improving the aircraft and increasing the South Korean military's operational abilities. The South Korean military has prepared plans for a counter-attack in the event of a first strike by North Korea.

=== UNSC Resolution 1874 ===
The United Nations Security Council unanimously adopted resolution 1874 in response to the test, imposing further economic sanctions on the country and authorising UN member states to inspect North Korean cargo and destroy any that may be involved in the nuclear weapons program. In response to the sanctions, an unidentified spokesman for the North Korean Foreign Ministry released a statement through the official Korean Central News Agency saying that the country would begin to "weaponize" its plutonium stockpiles. The spokesman also said the country "will start uranium enrichment" and would view any US-led attempts to "blockade" it as an "act of war". The statement was said to have lacked the usual bitterness of most North Korean statements.

== See also ==
- List of North Korean nuclear tests
- 2006 North Korean nuclear test
- 2013 North Korean nuclear test
- January 2016 North Korean nuclear test
- Mantapsan
- Artillery Guidance Bureau
- Military of North Korea
- North Korea and weapons of mass destruction
- Six-party talks
