= Mantapsan =

Mountain in North Korea famous for nuclear testing

Highest point
- Elevation: 2,205 m (7,234 ft)
- Coordinates: 41°17′55″N 129°04′54″E

Geography
- Location: Kilju County, North Hamgyong Province, North Korea
- Parent range: Hamgyong Mountains

Korean name
- Hangul: 만탑산
- Hanja: 萬塔山
- RR: Mantapsan
- MR: Mant'apsan

Mantapsan (or Mount Mant'ap, Korean: 만탑산) is a mountain in the south of North Hamgyong Province in North Korea. The granite peak, which reaches an elevation of 2,205 m (7,234 ft), is part of the Hamgyong Mountains. It is located on the border between Kilju County, Myŏnggan County and Orang County.

Political prisoners were reportedly forced to dig tunnels into the southern side of the mountain, at the nuclear test site near P'unggye-ri. The horizontal tunnels are believed to be two to three meters wide and high and hundreds of meters long. This is where the detonations of the North Korean nuclear tests in 2006, 2009, 2013 and 2016 occurred.

International analysts believe that the sixth and largest explosion, as of January 2024 the last, "made the mountain bulge sideways by about 12 feet and collapse vertically by about a foot and a half", with one seismologist describing the subsequent reaction as the mountain "pancaking".

Hwasong concentration camp, at 549 km^{2} (212 sq mi) the largest North Korean concentration camp, is located between Mantapsan and Myŏnggan (Hwasŏng).

== See also ==
- List of mountains in Korea
- Punggye-ri Nuclear Test Site
- 2006 North Korean nuclear test
- 2009 North Korean nuclear test
- 2013 North Korean nuclear test
- January 2016 North Korean nuclear test
- September 2016 North Korean nuclear test
- 2017 North Korean nuclear test
