= 2013 North Korean nuclear test =

Test detonation on 12 February 2013

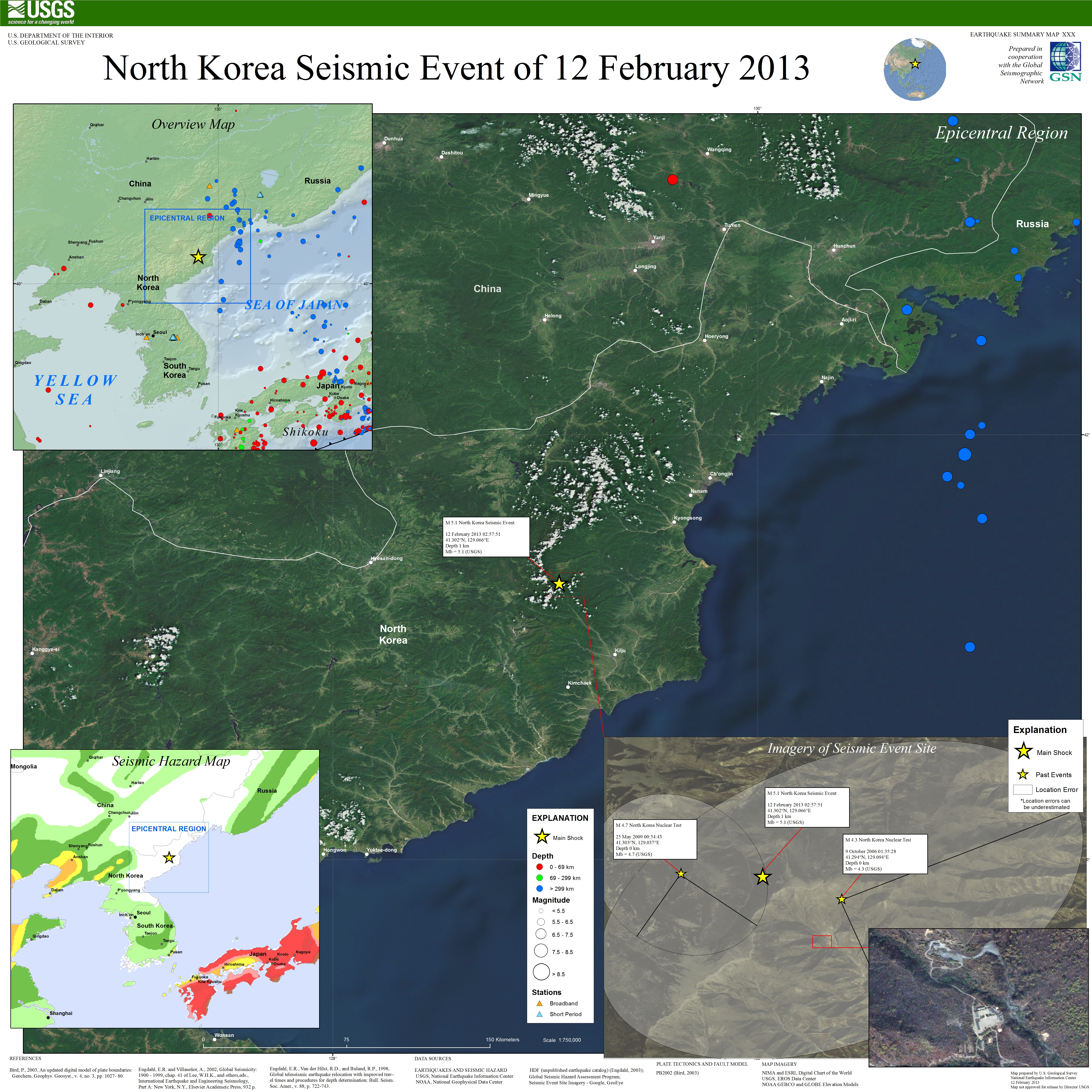
- USGS infographic on the event

Information
- Country: North Korea
- Test site: 41.30°N 129.08°E, Punggye-ri Nuclear Test Site, Kilju County
- Period: 11:57:51, 12 February 2013 KST
- Number of tests: 1
- Test type: Underground
- Device type: Fission
- Max. yield: Exact yield or intended yield was not announced by DPRK; 6–9 kilotons of TNT (25–38 TJ) (Estimations from South Korean Defense Ministry); 8–10 kilotons of TNT (33–42 TJ) (Japanese estimates); 8.4–16 kilotons of TNT (35–67 TJ) (Estimations from University of Science and Technology of China); More than 7 kilotons of TNT (29 TJ) (Russian Defence Ministry); 14 kilotons of TNT (59 TJ) (Estimation from Federal Institute for Geosciences and Natural Resources) - Initially however was estimated at 40 kilotons of TNT (170 TJ)

Test chronology

Location of North Korea's nuclear tests
1: 2006; 2: 2009; 3: 2013; 4: 2016-01; 5: 2016-09; 6: 2017;
V

On 12 February 2013, North Korean state media announced it had conducted an underground nuclear test, its third in seven years. A tremor that exhibited a nuclear bomb signature with an initial magnitude 4.9 (later revised to 5.1) was detected by the China Earthquake Networks Center, Preparatory Commission for the Comprehensive Nuclear-Test-Ban Treaty Organization and the United States Geological Survey. In response, Japan summoned an emergency United Nations meeting for 12 February and South Korea raised its military alert status. It is not known whether the explosion was nuclear, or a conventional explosion designed to mimic a nuclear blast; as of two days after the blast, Chinese, Japanese, and South Korean investigators had failed to detect any radiation.

== Test ==
On 12 February 2013, a spokesman for North Korea's army command said it had successfully conducted a third underground nuclear weapons test, according to the Yonhap. North Korea also said the test had used a miniaturized nuclear device with greater explosive power.

Before North Korea announced they had conducted the test, seismic activity had already been detected in North Korea by the United States Geological Survey (USGS) and the seismic network operated by the Comprehensive Nuclear-Test-Ban Treaty Organization (CTBTO) Preparatory Commission, near the site of previous nuclear tests at Mantapsan in Kilju County. A large tremor, first estimated at magnitude of 4.9, was detected in North Korea, and governments in the region were trying to determine whether it was a third nuclear test. The USGS upgraded the magnitude of the possibly nuclear tremor from 4.9 to 5.1, located 24 kilometres (15 mi) east-northeast of Sungjibaegam, North Korea. The tremor occurred at 11:57 am KST (2:57 am UTC), and the USGS said the hypocenter of the event was only one kilometer deep.

The China Earthquake Networks Center (Abbreviation: CENC; Chinese: 中国地震台网中心) also reported this event, putting the magnitude at M_{s} 4.9. The tremor caused by the test could be felt by residents of the neighboring city of Hunchun and Antu, in Yanbian, Jilin Province, China. The explosion was registered by 94 seismic stations and two infrasound stations in the CTBTO's global monitoring system. The CTBTO radionuclide network later made a significant detection of radioactive noble gases that could be attributed to the nuclear test.

== Yield estimates ==
South Korea's defense ministry said the event reading indicated a blast of 6–7 kilotons, later revised to 6–9 kilotons using the Comprehensive Nuclear Test Ban Treaty Organization's calculation method.

The Korea Institute of Geoscience and Mineral Resources estimated the yield as 7.7–7.8 kilotons while the Japanese put the estimation between 8 and 10 kilotons.

Some experts estimate the yield to be up to 15 kilotons, since the test site's geology is not well understood. The Russian Defence Ministry said the power of North Korea's nuclear test blast "surpassed 7 kilotons".

NORSAR compared the seismic data from all three North Korean nuclear tests and estimated the yield of the 2013 test as approximately 10 kilotons.

The Federal Institute for Geosciences and Natural Resources, a state-run geology research institute in Germany, estimated the yield initially at 40 kilotons. However, this estimation has since been revised to 14 kilotons of TNT (59 TJ) after the January 2016 North Korean nuclear test was conducted.

On 19 June 2013, the University of Science and Technology of China released a report that claimed that they had found the precise location of the test at latitude 41°17′26.88″, longitude 129°4′34.68″, with an error margin of 94 meters and the yield at around 12.2 kt, with a margin of error of 3.8 kt.

In comparison, the fission nuclear bombs dropped by the Enola Gay on Hiroshima (Little Boy, a "gun-type" nuclear bomb) and on Nagasaki by Bockscar (Fat Man, an "implosion-type" nuclear bomb) had blast yield equivalences of 16 and 21 kilotons respectively.

== Further tests ==
On 4 February 2013, a South Korean military official had stated that there was a "chance that the southern tunnel is a decoy, but we are not ruling out that the regime will conduct nuclear tests simultaneously at both tunnels". On 15 February 2013, North Korea had told China that they were preparing for one or two more nuclear tests that year. On 8 April 2013, South Korea had observed activity at Punggye-ri, suggesting that a fourth underground test was being prepared. It was later believed that the tunneling activity that started in April was for a long-term project, and that a nuclear test wouldn't occur soon.

According to a U.S. expert, North Korea has everything in place for a fourth explosion but is hesitating due to the fear that it would anger China. A professor from Georgetown University predicted that test would occur in spring 2014 at latest.

On 17 December 2013, a member of South Korea's parliamentary intelligence committee said that a nuclear and missile test would occur soon to draw attention away from the execution of Jang Sung-taek. This was said after North Korea floated propaganda leaflets to South Korea that threatened the annihilation of the island Baengnyeongdo.

On 22 April 2014, South Korea reported that North Korea had stepped up its activity at its main nuclear test site, meaning they may be preparing for their fourth underground nuclear test. The United States urged North Korea to refrain from testing.

On 6 January 2016 North Korea says it has successfully carried out a hydrogen bomb test, which if confirmed, would have been a first for the country and a significant advancement for its nuclear program. The test took place at 10 a.m. local time, the regime said in a televised statement. The seismic event, which measured the event at a magnitude of 5.1, occurred 19 kilometers (12 miles) east-northeast of Sungjibaegam, the United States Geological Survey said. A senior U.S. administration told CNN it could take days to obtain the scientific data to determine whether this was a successful test.

== Reactions ==
2013 Korean crisis
- Part of the division of Korea post-armistice conflicts
Date	January 24, 2013 – August 14, 2013 (6 months and 3 weeks)
Location	Korean Peninsula
Result	North Korea and South Korea resume operations at the Kaesong Industrial Complex.: North Korea conducted their third nuclear test.; Resolution 2094 of the Security Council sanctioned North Korea for the test.; North Korea declared that the "state of armistice" was no longer active.; Seoul–Pyongyang hotline restored by North Korea; North Korea claimed it was willing to develop peaceful relations with the world, on the condition that its status as a nuclear power is not challenged; resumption of the Six-Party Talks considered.; The national emergency declared in Executive Order 13466 is continued.

Belligerents
South Korea; United States; China; Japan	North Korea

Commanders and leaders
(South Korea) Park Geun-hye; (United States) Barack Obama; (China) Xi Jinping; (Japan) Shinzō Abe	(North Korea) Kim Jong-un

In response, Japan's Prime Minister, Shinzo Abe, called an urgent security meeting of the United Nations Security Council. The emergency session was to be held 9 am EST on 12 February 2013. Tibor Toth, executive secretary of the Comprehensive Nuclear-Test-Ban Treaty Organization Preparatory Commission (CTBTO), confirmed the event's location was "roughly congruent with" nuclear tests carried out by North Korea in 2006 and 2009. Japan's Kyodo News service reported the Japanese defense ministry had scrambled aircraft to hunt for radiation effects. Japan's government held a national security council meeting in Tokyo according to NHK. The South Korean military also raised its readiness level. China's Ministry of Foreign Affairs stated it strongly opposed the test. Chinese foreign minister Yang Jiechi contacted the North Korean ambassador to China in protest. In general, international reactions to the 2013 North Korean nuclear test have been almost uniformly negative.

=== International reaction ===
==== Countries involved in the crisis ====
Reactions of countries formerly part of the six-party talks and playing key roles in the crisis:

- United States: Caitlin Hayden, spokeswoman for the National Security Council of the United States said, "We take seriously these threats and we are in constant touch with our allies in South Korea." She also said her country would continue "taking additional measures against the threat of North Korea" as further reinforcement of the barrier Pacific missile.
- Japan: As the U.S. Secretary of State John Kerry visited Beijing, North Korea launched a new threat, this time to Japanese cities of Tokyo, Kyoto, and Osaka. During the visit, Kerry stated that North Korea will not be accepted as a nuclear power. In response to the threats, Japan deployed antimissile batteries in several spots surrounding its capital, Tokyo. Japan's Defence Minister, Itsunori Onodera, ordered the deployment of four Japanese Kongō-class destroyers to the Sea of Japan with orders to shoot down any North Korean missiles headed towards Japanese territory. The destroyers are equipped with the Aegis Ballistic Missile Defense System, and armed with SM-3 Block IA interceptors which are designed to intercept short to intermediate-range ballistic missiles.
- North Korea: On January 1, 2013, North Korean leader Kim Jong Un announced in his New Year's speech an urge for South Korea to put an end to the confrontation between the two. However, after the Security Council sanctions from the UN for the satellite launch Kwangmyongsong-3, North Korea conducted its third nuclear test and declared chancery on February 12 that it is a response to U.S. hostilities against the country, after which the escalating conflict increased until reaching military exercises between the U.S. and South Korea, on which spokesman Supreme Commander EPC reported on March 21 that the exercises Key Resolve and Foal Eagle U.S. South Korea are responsible for carrying the conflict to the peninsula and to be taken as white islands Guam and Okinawa from where U.S. deploys its fleet of B-52 bombers and nuclear submarines. On March 30 the government, political parties and other North Korean entities issued a statement announcing any provocation against North Korea by the U.S. and South Korea will be considered an invasion and will result in a "war without quarter" and would entail the use of nuclear weapons.

==== Other countries ====
- Australia: Bob Carr, Foreign Minister, said the UN Security Council had to impose tougher sanctions on North Korea following the regime's threat of a nuclear strike against the US and he said he will make a personal appeal for China to persuade North Korea to ratchet down its behaviour.
- China: Hong Lei, spokesman for the Chinese Foreign Ministry said it was hoped that "the parties to work together to lobby and get a turnaround in the currently tense situation." China defended the resumption of negotiations on the six-party talks, which include North and South Korea, China, Russia, the United States and Japan. Talks have been stalled since 2008 by North Korean decision.
- Colombia: Colombia's Foreign Ministry released a statement condemning the use of force and disrespect of the Armistice of 1953. The Ministry of Foreign Affairs also issued a statement, saying, "We are deeply concerned about recent statements and actions of the Democratic People's Republic of Korea, threatening stability and peace in the Korean Peninsula."
- Cuba: The former Cuban leader, Fidel Castro, urged both parties to show restraint. He called the situation "incredible and absurd" and said that war would not benefit either side. "This is one of the gravest risks of nuclear war since the October Crisis in 1962 involving Cuba, 50 years ago." He added: "If a conflict of that nature should break out there, the government of Barack Obama in his second mandate would be buried in a deluge of images which would present him as the most sinister character in the history of the United States. The duty of avoiding war is also his and that of the people of the United States."
- Ecuador: The Ecuadorian Foreign Ministry condemned the deteriorating situation between North Korea and South Korea, demanding that countries that possess nuclear weapons and threaten humanity destroy their weapons of mass extermination, appealing also to the United States, Russia and China not to exacerbate the tension in the region.
- Germany: The Foreign Minister Guido Westerwelle said that the North Korean government "should stop playing with fire" and that the German government was working with its partners to ensure that Pyongyang "[ends] their threats and abandon its nuclear program, which is in violation of international law ".
- Holy See: On Easter Sunday March 31, Pope Francis in his Urbi et Orbi address called for peace and reconciliation over the escalating Korean crisis.
- Iran: Tehran says it wants to export oil to Pyongyang. Agreement is not yet reached.
- Italy: Foreign Minister Giulio Terzi strongly condemned saying that the test threatens regional stability and global security, and he also added that Italy with the United Nations will take action against North Korea nuclear plan.
- Mexico: On March 30, through a statement from the Ministry of Foreign Affairs, the Mexican government asked for North Korea to resolve their disputes through "the path of dialogue and negotiation" and stated that Mexico "calls on all parties to show restraint and make all efforts that are within its power to prevent an escalation of this situation and to keep searching a final negotiated settlement on the Korean Peninsula."
- Peru: On March 30, a statement from the Ministry of Foreign Affairs said the Peruvian government was in favor of dialogue and cooperation between North and South Korea and the resumption of six-party talks on the nuclear issue in that part of Asia.
- Philippines: On April 5, Philippine President Benigno Aquino III ordered Foreign Affairs Secretary Albert del Rosario to the Philippine Embassy in Seoul to oversee the preparations for a possible evacuation of nearly 50,000 Filipinos currently in South Korea. Despite this, Aquino said that there is no reason for the public to be alarmed of the situation. 8 days later, on the 13th, in a meeting with US State Secretary John Kerry, Philippine Defense Secretary Voltaire Gazmin offered the opening of military bases to US forces in the event of a war with North Korea.
- Romania: The Minister of Foreign Affairs recommended Romanians to avoid visits to North Korea. Titus Corlățean conveyed to Kim Jong-un that is needed a relief to the current situation on the Korean Peninsula.
- Russia: Russia urged the United States and North Korea to show restraint. Russian foreign ministry official Grigory Logvinov stated, "We hope that all parties will exercise maximum responsibility and restraint and no one will cross the point of no return." On April 8, in a joint news conference with German Chancellor Angela Merkel during his visit to a trade fair in Germany, President Putin said "I would make no secret about it, we are worried about the escalation on the Korean peninsula, because we are neighbors, And if, God forbid, something happens, Chernobyl which we all know a lot about, may seem like a child's fairy tale. Is there such a threat or not? I think there is... I would urge everyone to calm down... and start to resolve the problems that have piled up for many years there at the negotiating table"
- Spain: The Minister of Foreign Affairs and Cooperation, José Manuel García-Margallo, said that the European Union has urged North Korea to negotiate with all countries in the area to maintain "security and stability" in East Asia. He also said that "there is a huge concern in Spain, in the European Union and around the world race North Korean provocations."
- United Kingdom: Foreign Secretary William Hague has condemned North Korea's nuclear test, calling it a "violation of United Nations Security Council resolutions" and advocating a response by the UN Security Council. He has also called on North Korea to "engage in credible and multilateral talk", and dismissed calls for British Embassy staff to leave North Korea.

== See also ==
- 2013 in North Korea
- Foreign relations of North Korea
- List of nuclear weapons tests of North Korea
- North Korea and weapons of mass destruction
- North Korean withdrawal from the Korean Armistice Agreement – post reaction to the nuclear test by North Korea, South Korea and the United States
- UN Resolution 2094
