= 2006 North Korean nuclear test =

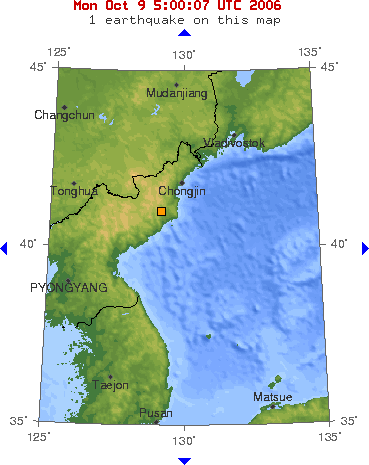
- Graphic showing seismic activity at the time of the test

Information
- Country: North Korea
- Test site: Punggye-ri Nuclear Test Site, Kilju County
- Period: 10:35:28 KST, 9 October 2006
- Number of tests: 1
- Test type: Unknown
- Device type: Fission
- Max. yield: 0.48 kilotons of TNT (2.0 TJ) (Chinese academics); 0.55–12 kilotons of TNT (2.3–50.2 TJ) (Jane's Defence Weekly & South Korean estimates, but raised doubts on the lower end estimates because it does not correspond with the 4.2 Richter scale); 5–15 kilotons of TNT (21–63 TJ); 0.7–2 kilotons of TNT (2.9–8.4 TJ)(estimations from Federal Institute for Geosciences and Natural Resources)

Test chronology

Location of North Korea's nuclear tests
1: 2006; 2: 2009; 3: 2013; 4: 2016-01; 5: 2016-09; 6: 2017;
V

On 9 October 2006, North Korea performed its first nuclear test, detonating a plutonium-based device underground. The test made North Korea the tenth country to develop and the eighth to openly test nuclear weapons.

On 3 October 2006, North Korea announced its intention to conduct a nuclear test. The blast is generally estimated to have had an explosive force of less than one kiloton, and some radioactive output was detected. United States officials suggested the device may have been a nuclear explosive that misfired.

An anonymous official at the North Korean Embassy in Beijing told a South Korean newspaper that the explosive output was smaller than expected. Because of the secretive nature of North Korea and small yield of the test, there remains some question as to whether it was a successful test of an unusually small device (which would have required sophisticated technology), or a partially failed "fizzle" or dud. A scientific paper later estimated the yield as 0.48 kilotons.

Reportedly the Chinese government was given a 20-minute advance notification that the test was about to occur. China sent an emergency alert to Washington, D.C., through the U.S. Embassy in Beijing at which time President George W. Bush was told by National Security Advisor Stephen Hadley "shortly after" 10 p.m. (UTC-5) that a test was imminent.

== Background ==
North Korea had been suspected of maintaining a clandestine nuclear weapons development program since the early 1980s when it constructed a plutonium-producing Magnox nuclear reactor at Yongbyon, and various diplomatic means had been used by the international community to attempt to limit North Korea's nuclear work to peaceful and scientific means and encouraging North Korea to participate in international treaties. In 1994, the United States and North Korea signed the "Agreed Framework", whereby North Korea agreed to freeze its graphite moderated reactor program in exchange for fuel, moves toward normalization of political and economic relations, and the construction of two modern nuclear power plants powered by light-water reactors. Eventually, North Korea's existing nuclear facilities were to be dismantled, and the spent reactor fuel taken out of the country.

However, in 2002, rumors circulated that North Korea was pursuing both uranium enrichment technology and plutonium reprocessing technologies in defiance of the Agreed Framework. North Korea reportedly told American diplomats in private that they were in possession of nuclear weapons, citing American failures to uphold their own end of the "Agreed Framework" as a motivating force. North Korea later clarified that it did not possess weapons yet, but that it had a right to possess them. In late 2002 and early 2003, North Korea began to take steps to eject International Atomic Energy Agency inspectors while re-routing spent fuel rods for plutonium reprocessing for weapons purposes. Throughout the course of 2003, North Korean and American officials exchanged harsh words and staged military exercises which were interpreted by the other party to be aggressive. As late as the end of 2003, North Korea claimed that it would freeze its nuclear program in exchange for American concessions – in particular a non-aggression treaty – but a final agreement was not reached and talks continued to be cancelled or fall through. North Korea withdrew from the Nuclear Non-Proliferation Treaty in 2003 after not receiving light-water reactors promised by the United States which were going to be delivered in exchange for North Korea not developing their own power plants, as understood in the "Agreed Framework".

In early 2004 former Los Alamos National Laboratory director Siegfried S. Hecker, as part of an unofficial U.S. delegation, was allowed to inspect North Korea's plutonium production facilities. Hecker later testified before the United States Congress that while North Korea seemed to have successfully extracted plutonium from the spent fuel rods, he saw no evidence at the time that they had produced a workable weapon. In 2007, the former senior scientist of Pakistan, Abdul Qadeer Khan claimed that North Korea's nuclear program was well advanced before his visit in 1993 with Benazir Bhutto, former prime minister.

In September 2004, though, North Korean officials announced they had successfully processed Yongbyon plutonium into a workable nuclear deterrent. Through 2005 more diplomatic talks were attempted between the United States, North Korea, South Korea, China, Japan, and Russia (the six-party talks) but little concrete change occurred.

Because North Korea had not conducted a successful test of a nuclear device, the extent of its nuclear weapons program remained ambiguous through 2005 and much of 2006. Though North Korea conducted numerous missile tests (some of which were branded failures by international experts), the question of whether they had actually mastered all aspects of nuclear weapons technology – ranging from material production to complex nuclear weapon design needed to produce the final detonation – remained unanswered. As of 2013 there was agreement in the U.S. intelligence community that North Korea could build a "modest" bomb with a yield of between 6 and 10 kilotons, but disagreement between Defense Intelligence Agency, CIA and the United States State Department over whether it could deploy a miniaturized warhead on a missile.

== North Korean statements ==
Rumours of an impending nuclear test circulated during 2005 and early 2006, though none came to immediate fruition. On 3 October 2006, however, North Korea claimed that it would soon conduct a nuclear test, and on 9 October 2006, the state claimed to have successfully conducted a test. The Korean Central News Agency, the state's news agency, issued the following statement:

The field of scientific research in the DPRK successfully conducted an underground nuclear test under secure conditions on October 9, Juche 95 (2006), at a stirring time when all the people of the country are making a great leap forward in the building of a great, prosperous, powerful socialist nation.

It has been confirmed that there was no such danger as radioactive emission in the course of the nuclear test as it was carried out under scientific consideration and careful calculation.

The nuclear test was conducted with indigenous wisdom and technology 100 percent. It marks an historic event as it greatly encouraged and pleased the KPA and people that have wished to have powerful self-reliant defence capability.

It will contribute to defending the peace and stability on the Korean Peninsula and in the area around it.

Later, the North Korean envoy to the UN said it would be better for the Security Council to offer its congratulations rather than pass "useless" resolutions.

=== Threats of war ===
On 10 October 2006, an unnamed North Korean official was quoted as saying that North Korea could launch a nuclear missile unless the United States would sit down for face-to-face talks. However, few, if any, military and defense experts believed that the North Koreans possessed the technology to mount a nuclear warhead to a ballistic missile.

On 11 October the Associated Press reported that North Korea had threatened war if attempts would be made to penalize them through further sanctions. This statement occurred even as Japan moved to tighten sanctions on the country. South Korea said they were ensuring their troops were prepared for nuclear war. A U.S. Army major, stationed along the border between North and South Korea, said that the overall situation was "calm" but that "Communist troops were more boldly trying to provoke their southern counterparts: spitting across the demarcation line, making throat-slashing hand gestures, flashing their middle fingers and trying to talk to the troops."

On the day of the test, the North Korean Foreign Ministry stated that "if the U.S. keeps pestering us and increases pressure, we will regard it as a declaration of war and will take a series of physical corresponding measures".

On 17 October, North Korea denounced UN sanctions over its nuclear test as a declaration of war and the United States and other nations suspected that North Korea was seeking to conduct a second nuclear test despite international pressure.

=== Kim Jong Il's alleged apology ===
On 20 October 2006, North Korean leader Kim Jong Il allegedly said that he was "sorry" over his country's nuclear test, and wished to return to talk with the United Nations. According to a Chinese envoy, Kim Jong-il said:

If the U.S. makes a concession to some degree, we will also make a concession to some degree, whether it be bilateral talks or six-party talks

Kim Jong Il also stated that he had no future plans to test another nuclear device; the U.S. State Department discounted this report.

=== Return to six-party talks ===
On 31 October 2006, North Korea agreed to rejoin six-nation disarmament talks. The agreement was struck in a day of unpublicized discussions between the senior envoys from the United States, China and North Korea at a government guesthouse in Beijing. The talks resumed on 18 December 2006.

== Yield estimates and authenticity ==
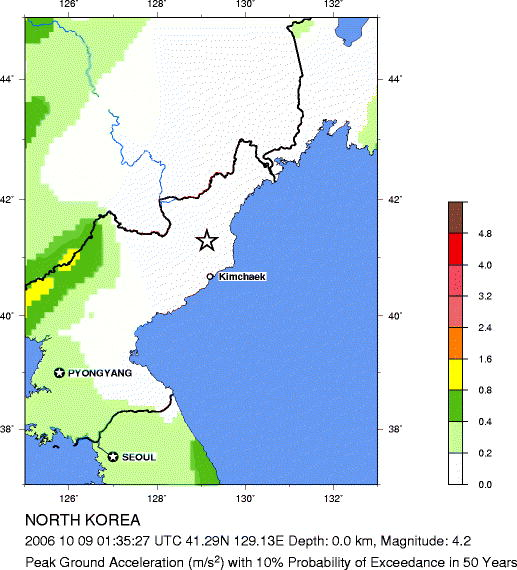
The site vs. 50-year predictions, according to USGS, indicating the probability of the detected blast being due to natural causes.

The low yield of the test initially raised questions as to whether it was a nuclear explosion but detection of airborne radioactive isotopes by a United States military aircraft confirmed that it was a nuclear explosion. Radioactive isotopes of the element xenon are produced by the atom splitting that takes place in nuclear explosions and readily seeps out even from underground tests. The advance warning of the test sent to the Chinese government reportedly said that the planned test yield was to be equivalent to approximately four kilotons in strength, but most outside estimates, based largely on seismic readings, put the yield at much less.

At a meeting with President Vladimir Putin, Russian Defence Minister Sergei Ivanov stated that "the power of the tests carried out was 5 to 15 kilotons", though this early estimate is much higher than any other international estimate. An early report by the Institute of Geoscience and Mineral Resources of South Korea said the blast was equivalent to an earthquake registering 3.58 on the Richter scale, which corresponds to the explosion of 100 tons of TNT. This was later revised to at least 800 tons, corresponding to a blast wave of 4.2. The U.S. Geological Survey also estimates the blast wave at 4.2. (Note that 4.2 is considerably more powerful than 3.58 because the Richter scale is a logarithmic scale.)

According to Jane's Defence Weekly, "initial and unconfirmed South Korean reports indicate that the test was a fission device with a yield of 0.55 kT ... The figure of 0.55 kT, however, seems too low given the 4.2 register on the Richter scale. This could suggest – depending upon the geological make-up of the test site – a yield of 2–12 kT".

An official in France's Atomic Energy Commission reported that they estimated the blast was "about or less than a kiloton" and expressed uncertainty about whether or not the blast was actually nuclear. There have been various large planned and unplanned non-nuclear explosions comparable in yield to small nuclear detonations, such as the U.S. "Minor Scale" explosion from 1985, which used conventional explosives to simulate a 4 kiloton detonation. According to the Washington Times anonymous U.S. intelligence sources speculated there "was a seismic event that registered about 4 on the Richter scale, but it still isn't clear if it was a nuclear test. You can get that kind of seismic reading from high explosives". The Wall Street Journal explains that this blast was equivalent to the explosive force of about US$100,000 worth of ammonium nitrate. International experts have said that it will take some time to confirm whether it was a successful nuclear test, as North Korea claimed, or an unsuccessful one ("fizzle"), or perhaps not even a nuclear test at all.

However 7 years later, after the 2013 nuclear test, the Federal Institute for Geosciences and Natural Resources, a state-run geology research institute in Germany, estimated the yield ranging at minimum of 700 tons to the max of 2 kilotons and the 2009 test ranges from minimum of 5 kilotons to the max of 12 kilotons instead with relevant statistics.

By comparison, the first plutonium core nuclear device tested by the United States (Trinity test) had a yield of 20 kilotons of TNT, and the first nuclear device detonated by India in 1974, though of primitive design, had a yield in the region of 8 kilotons of TNT. If the North Korean nuclear test was less than even a kiloton in yield, it would be a historically small inaugural nuclear test. Even if it were as many as the reported intentional yield of 4 kt it would be the smallest nuclear test ever conducted by a state as a first test. Some advanced nuclear powers have produced very small tactical nuclear weapons in the low-kiloton range, but their development is far more technologically challenging than that of weapons in the 15–20 kiloton range, requiring advanced weapons materials and core geometries.

If the North Korean device was significantly short of its predicted yield, it could be classified as a "fizzle" indicating that some aspect of the nuclear weapon design or material production did not function correctly. In a fizzle the warhead blows itself apart too fast for the nuclear reactions to generate a large amount of energy, or fails to form a supercritical mass for some other reason. A fizzle can result from predetonation, insufficient precision in the explosive lenses used to compress the plutonium core, or impurities in the plutonium itself, among other factors. A fizzle can also result from the use of reactor grade plutonium rather than weapons-grade material.

On 13 October 2006, CNN reported that two U.S. government officials with access to classified information stated that the initial air sampling over North Korea shows no indication of radioactive debris from the event that North Korea says was an underground nuclear test. Some hours later, the report was reversed and stated there was evidence of radiation, though not enough data has been collected yet to be conclusive. The newspaper Hankyoreh reported an unnamed North Korean diplomat had acknowledged that the actual yield was smaller than expected.

On 16 October 2006, the United States government reported that a test had found radioactive gas compatible with a nuclear explosion.

The office of John Negroponte, the U.S. Director of National Intelligence confirmed that the size of the explosion was less than 1 kiloton.

The explosion was also recorded worldwide by the global monitoring system operated by the Preparatory Commission for the Comprehensive Nuclear-Test-Ban Treaty Organization (CTBTO). Two weeks after the detonation, a CTBTO radionuclide monitoring station in northern Canada detected traces of the radioactive noble gas xenon in the air. Backtracking calculations by analysts at the CTBTO indicated that the xenon particles originated from North Korea and that the explosion had been nuclear in nature.

== Test site location ==
A map of the Korean peninsula. The estimated location of the test (41.311°N, 129.114°E) is marked in red.

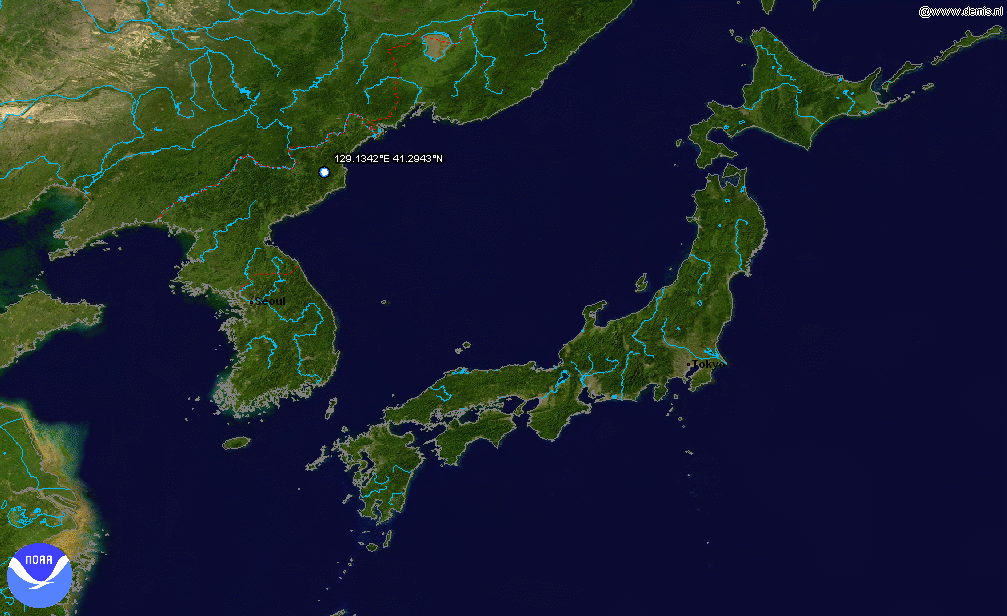
NASA Blue Marble Image of estimated location of the test (41.2943° N 129.1342° E)

According to initial reports from South Korean government sources, the test was carried out at a mountain in Musadan-ri in Hwadae-kun, near the city of Kilchu, in North Hamgyŏng province on the northeast coast. However, later reports from the state National Intelligence Service identified the site as being a place in Sangpyong-ri, about 15 km from the coastal city of Kimchaek and about 50 km west of Musadan-ri.

The Korea Institute of Geoscience and Mineral Resources reported seismic waves measuring 3.58 on the Richter scale. The United States Geological Survey reported that a seismic event occurred at 01:35:28 UTC (10:35:28 am local time, UTC+9) on 9 October 2006, and measured 4.3 on the Richter scale. It occurred at the geographic coordinates 41°17′38.4″N 129°08′2.4″E with a horizontal location uncertainty of ±9.6 km (6.0 miles). This is near Mantapsan, 73 km (45 mi) north of Kimchaek, 90 km (56 mi) southwest of Chongjin, 180 km (110 mi) south of Yanji, and 385 km (239 mi) northeast of Pyongyang.

== International reaction ==
International condemnation of the tests by governments has been nearly unanimous, including from North Korea's close ally and benefactor, China. China's Ministry of Foreign Affairs issued a statement October 9 calling the test a "flagrant and brazen" violation of international opinion, and adding that China "firmly opposes" North Korea's actions. The Ministry also stated "China strongly calls on North Korea to conform to its denuclearisation commitment, stop all the activities that might further de-stabilise the region, and back to the Six Party talks". All five veto-wielding permanent members of the United Nations Security Council condemned the nuclear test. On October 10, however, South Korean Prime Minister Han Myeong-sook told Parliament that South Korea will not support any United Nations resolution containing military measures against North Korea in retaliation for its nuclear test.

== Economic impact ==
Negative economic effects were seen throughout the region after the test. South Korea's KOSPI index fell 2.4% to 1319.4, forcing the Korea Exchange to suspend trading for five minutes upon receiving the news. The Japanese and Taiwanese stock exchanges were closed for a market holiday on the day of the test. The Japanese yen also fell to a seven-month low against the United States dollar while oil on the world market rose above US$60 a barrel. Gold prices rose 1% as a safe haven investment. Several stock markets in Asia from the Singapore Exchange to the Philippine Stock Exchange have traded lower, possibly due to the tests. American stock markets were mixed, with the Dow Jones Industrial Average down at its open the next day; however, at 10:30 am EDT, the Dow rebounded and concluded the day with an increase of 7.60 points (+0.06%). NSE and BSE of India, however, showed some strength.

== United Nations' response ==
On 14 October 2006, the UN Security Council unanimously approved limited military and economic sanctions against North Korea. All five permanent members stated that the sanctions, set out in UNSC Resolution 1718, were intended to penalize the country's regime, not inhabitants. They also stated that if North Korea were willing to cooperate and complied with all the measures contained in the resolution, the sanctions would be lifted. The United States compromised on its initial desire to block all imports of military equipment, and to have an unlimited reference to Chapter VII of the United Nations Charter so providing a legal justification for future military action, in order to gain full support for the resolution.

== See also ==
- 2006 North Korean missile test
- Japan–North Korea relations
- Japan–North Korea Pyongyang Declaration (2002)
- List of nuclear weapons tests of North Korea
  - 2009 North Korean nuclear test
  - 2013 North Korean nuclear test
  - January 2016 North Korean nuclear test
  - September 2016 North Korean nuclear test
- List of states with nuclear weapons
- Mantapsan
- Milestone nuclear explosions
- North Korea and weapons of mass destruction
- North Korea–United States relations
- Six-party talks (2003–2009)
- United Nations Security Council Resolution 1718
