= Christoph Clauser =

German Geophysicist and university professor, member of German Academy of Sciences

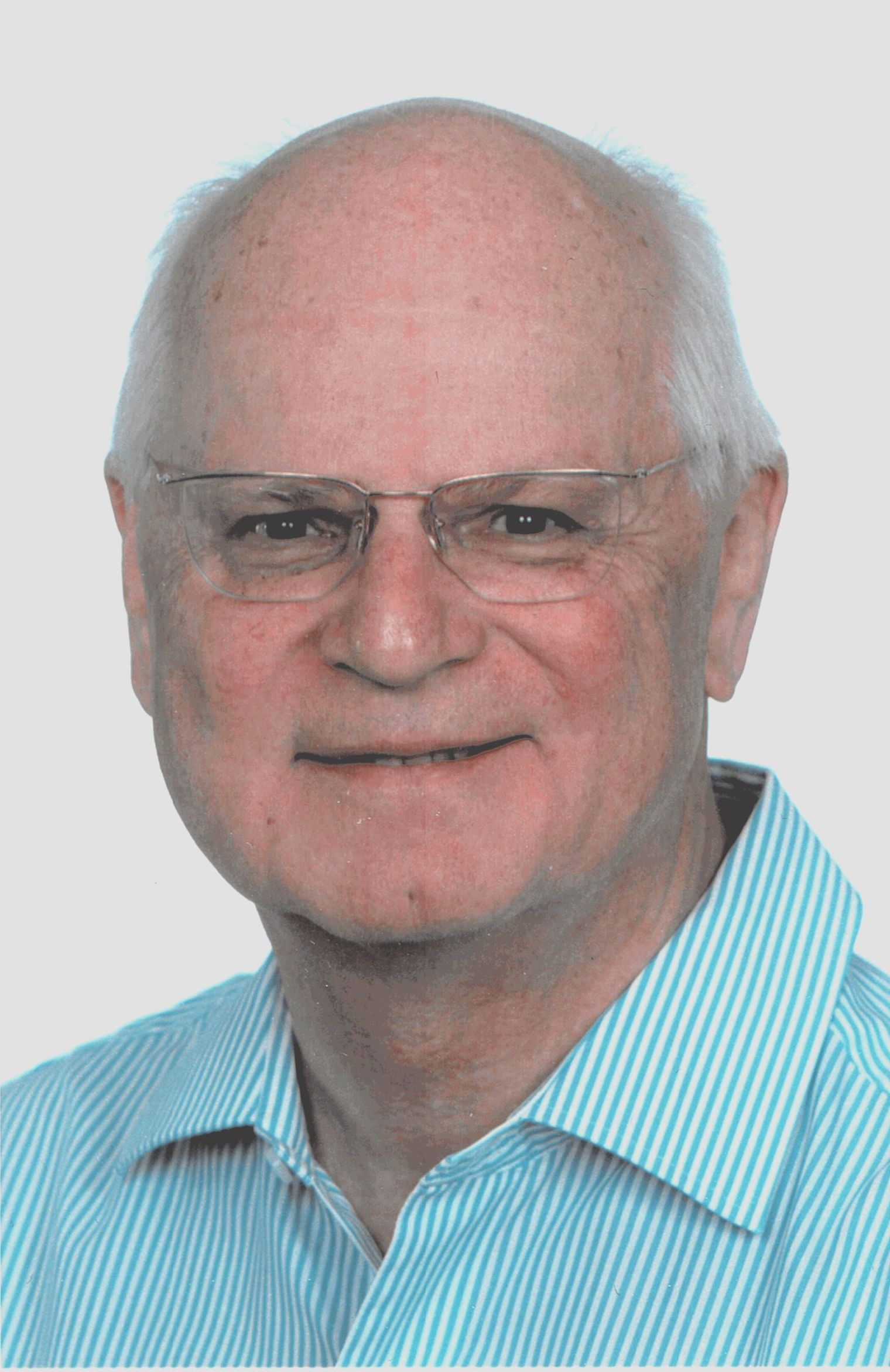
Christoph Clauser in 2024

Christoph Clauser (born 18 March 1954 in Freiburg im Breisgau) is a German geophysicist and university professor.

== Background and private life ==
Clauser is the second son of Ursula Clauser, and Günter Clauser, a medical doctor. His older brother was a civil engineer named Thomas Clauser. He has been married to mathematician and geographer Karin Becker since 1986. They have two children, the materials scientist Johanna Charlotte Clauser and the chemist and tec hnical product designer Simon Alexander Clauser.

== Education and professional career ==
Christoph Clauser attended elementary school in Lehen (Freiburg im Breisgau) and the Kepler High School . From 1970 to 1971 he was an exchange student of AFS Intercultural Programs (formerly American Field Service) as a guest in the family of Enid and Robert Snyder and attended the graduating class of Hempfield High School in Lancaster, PA . He then continued his education at Kepler High School, graduating in 1973.

In 1973, he began studying geophysics at the TU Berlin (Technische Universität Berlin), graduating in 1981. His diploma thesis, supervised by Dr. Heiner Villinger, dealt with the Calculation of a temperature correction of Earth temperature data based on multi-year, non-periodic temperature fluctuations at the Earth's surface. From 1981 to 1987, he worked as a research assistant at the Institute for Applied Geophysics, Petrology and Economic Geology, headed by Jörn Behrens, where he worked on various research projects in the field of geothermics and developed the first version of the computer program SHEMAT. for the simulation of heat and mass transfer in porous media. In 1988, under the supervision of Ralph Hänel, he was awarded a doctorate (Dr. rer. nat) at the TU Berlin with a dissertation on Investigations on the separation of conductive and convective components in the heat transport in a sediment basin using the example of the Upper Rhine Rift Valley.

From 1987 to 1989, he worked as a fluid mechanics/hydrogeology expert in the repository safety group of the Institute for Deep Geological Repositories (Braunschweig) of the Gesellschaft für Strahlen und Umweltforschung München mbH (GSF) (now Helmholtz Zentrum München). From 1989 to 2000, he was a research scientist in the geophysics department of the Geological Survey of Lower Saxony (NLfB), which later became the Leibniz Institute for Applied Geophysics, and head of the sections groundwater hydraulics, geothermics and groundwater hydraulics.

In 1995 Clauser obtained the second doctorate (Habilitation) at the University of Bonn (Rheinische Friedrich-Wilhelms-Universität Bonn), supervised by Horst Neugebauer, with the topic Heat transport processes in the Earth's crust and their signatures in the temperature field and received the Venia Legendi for the subject Geophysics. In 2000, he was appointed Professor of Applied Geophysics at RWTH Aachen University (Rheinisch-Westfälische Technische Hochschule Aachen), a position he held until 2007, when he accepted the Chair of Applied Geophysics and Geothermal Energy at RWTH Aachen University as part of the E.ON Energy Research Center, a position he held until his retirement in 2018.

In 2006, together with his colleagues Alan Green at ETH Zurich, Kees Wapenaar and Evert Slob at TU Delft, he founded the trinational, English-language IDEA League master's program Applied Geophysics. In addition to numerous diploma, bachelor's and master's theses, he supervised 23 doctoral students during his time as a university lecturer and was the second supervisor for ten others.

As author and co-author, Clauser has published over 80 scientific articles on the topics of heat and mass transport in the Earth, paleoclimate, numerical simulation technology, rock and borehole physics as well as geothermal energy in peer-reviewed international scientific journals as well as a monograph on the physics of the Earth in German and English as well as a German monograph on exploration seismology and gravimetry. Together with his Aachen colleagues Helge Stanjek and Stefan Peiffer, Clauser obtained a German and a European patent for a method and arrangement for the storage and permanent fixation of CO_{2} dissolved in water in geological formations.

== Economic activity ==
In 2002, Karin and Christoph Clauser founded and operated the Geophysica Beratungsgesellschaft mbH in Aachen, a consultancy with focus on geothermal energy and the interpretation of geophysical borehole measurements, which they operated until mid-2024. It has been operating under new management since August 2024.

== Memberships and honors ==
In 2011, Clauser was elected to the German Academy of Sciences Leopoldina. There he headed a working group on geothermal energy as part of the joint project Energy Systems of the Future of the Leopoldina, German Academy of Science and Engineering and Union of the German Academies of Sciences and Humanities. In addition, he was part of a group of experts preparing a discussion paper on issues relating to the search for sites and disposal of highly radioactive materials in Germany.

Clauser served the International Heat Flow Commission of the IASPEI (International Association of Seismology and Physics and the Earth's Interior), from 1987 until 2015 in various capacities as Secretary, Deputy Secretary, Deputy Chairman, and Chairman . He was a member of the Forschungskollegium Physik des Erdkörpers (FKPE) from 2000 to 2018 and was its Chairman (2003 - 2005) and Vice-Chairman (2001-2003). Until 2024, he was a member of the AGU (American Geophysical Union) and SEG (Society of Exploration Geophysicists). He is a member of the Deutsche Geophysikalische Gesellschaft and Vereinigung Aachener Geowissenschaftler.
