= Korean Society of Earth and Exploration Geophysicists =

Korean scientific organization

The Korean Society of Earth and Exploration Geophysicists (KSEG, 한국지구물리·물리탐사학회) is an incorporated association, with the aim of promoting the solid earth geophysics, the geophysical exploration and the related applications, and thus contributing to the national life of high quality and to the national economy.

It was founded June 7, 2007 by integrating the two then existing societies of Korean Society of Geophysics and Korean Society of Exploration Geophysicists established respectively in 1998.
