= Turam method =

Geophysical electro-magnetic method used for mineral exploration

The Turam method is one of the oldest geophysical electro-magnetic methods used for mineral exploration, devised by Erik Helmer Lars Hedstrom in 1937. Its name is derived from Swedish "TU" (two) and "RAM" (frame), referring to the two receiving coils.

== Method ==
An insulated cable a few hundred meters to several kilometers long is laid parallel to the geological strike direction. The cable is either grounded at both ends or laid out in a large loop, and energized at low frequencies (less than 1 kHz). Two receiving coils are moved on lines outside of and perpendicular to the long side of the loop or grounded cable and two components of the resultant field are measured. The primary field generated by the large loop or cable interacts with the soil and subsoil and with a conductive body if present which could be a mineral and creates a resultant electromagnetic field. The electromagnetic field is measured according to two values: the Field Strength Ratio and the Phase Difference occurring between the two receiving coils. It is a fixed source horizontal loop method. Separation of the two moving coils is usually from 10 to 30 metres. Using an AC bridge (also called compensator bridge), Field Strength Ratio is measured in percent and Phase Difference in degrees. In-phase (Real) and quadrature (Imaginary) values can be calculated from these data. Observed field strength ratio readings are used to calculate reduced ratios using a formula determined by the loop size and shape or the grounded wire length and the position of the receiving coils relative to the loop or grounded wire. The Turam method is a frequency domain method and in a way is the precursor of the time domain fixed loop methods. It is claimed to have detected large flat lying conductors to a depth of 400 metres.
