= North Korea crisis =

North Korea crisis or North Korean crisis may refer to:

- Korean Missile Crisis (2013)
- 2017–18 North Korea crisis
