= September 2016 North Korean nuclear test =

September 2016 North Korea nuclear test
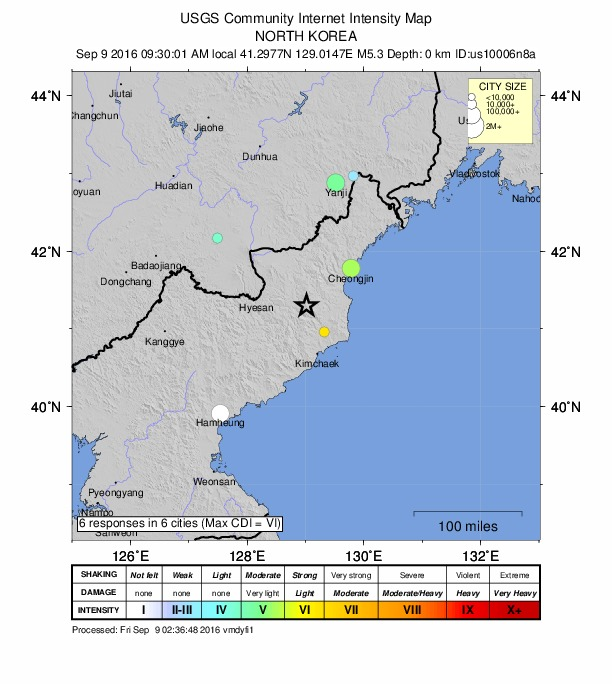
- Graphic from the United States Geological Survey showing the location of seismic activity at the time of the test

Information
- Country: North Korea
- Test site: 41.298°N 129.015°E, Punggye-ri Nuclear Test Site, Kilju County
- Period: 09:00, 9 September 2016 UTC+08:30 (00:30:01 UTC)
- Number of tests: 1
- Test type: Underground
- Max. yield: Exact yield was not announced by North Korea (Democratic People's Republic of Korea); Estimated at about 10 kilotons of TNT (42 TJ) (South Korea estimation); 20–30 kilotons of TNT (84–126 TJ) (Jeffrey Lewis of the California-based Middlebury Institute of International Studies); 25 kilotons of TNT (100 TJ) (Federal Institute for Geosciences and Natural Resources); 11.9–23.7 kilotons of TNT (50–99 TJ) (University of Science and Technology of China)

Test chronology

Location of North Korea's nuclear tests
1: 2006; 2: 2009; 3: 2013; 4: 2016-01; 5: 2016-09; 6: 2017;
V

The government of North Korea conducted a nuclear detonation on 9 September 2016, the fifth since 2006, at the Punggye-ri Nuclear Test Site, approximately 50 kilometres (30 miles) northwest of Kilju City in Kilju County.

== Background ==
North Korea's previous nuclear test was conducted 8 months earlier in January 2016 and drew sharp international condemnations. Despite calls from China and Russia to return to the six-party talks, North Korea maintained its nuclear and missile ambitions:

- During the 7th Congress of the Workers' Party of Korea, Kim Jong Un announced a route of parallel development of nuclear weapons and the nation's economy, and the planned date for the fifth nuclear test launch was announced.
- On 22 June 2016, North Korea successfully launched its land-based medium-range missile Hwasong-10 to an altitude of 1,413.7 kilometres (878.4 mi) and a range of 400 kilometres (250 mi). The missile test demonstrates that the missile's range could be as far as about 3500 km. Even though some experts are skeptical about whether Hwasong-10 has the capability to deliver the warhead to the U.S. Guam military base at the configuration used in this test, they agreed that Guam is in the range if the weight of the warhead can be reduced from 650 kg (1,430 lb) to less than 500 kg (1,100 lb).
- On 7 July 2016, South Korea announced its decision to deploy THAAD, despite the strong objections from China and Russia.
- On 24 August 2016, North Korea successfully launched its submarine-launched ballistic missile Pukguksong-1 into Japan's air defense identification zone with a 500 kilometres (310 mi) range and similar altitude. Using a more reliable cold launch technology and solid-fuel rocket, North Korea is developing its technology towards having a second-strike deterrence. The test was the first time North Korea was able to develop a solid-fuel rocket. It had previously been assumed that North Korea was only able to develop liquid fuel missiles, as evidenced of Rodong-1.
- The United States and South Korean joint military exercise occurring twice a year — Foal Eagle in February until April and Ulchi-Freedom Guardian in August until September—concluded on 2 September 2016. North Korea regularly raised strong objections to the drills because it interprets the drills as "hostile forces...preparing for an invasion into North Korea".
- On 5 September 2016, North Korea fired three consecutive Hwasong-9 (Scud-ER) missiles into the Sea of Japan and at a range of about 1,000 km (620 mi).

The nuclear test was conducted on 9 September 2016, which is the 68th anniversary of the founding of North Korea.

== Yield estimates ==
According to South Korean and Japanese estimates, the nuclear yield was equivalent to about 10 kilotons of TNT (10 kt), generating about a 5.3 magnitude seismic shock. This would make the explosion the largest North Korean nuclear test until a follow-up test in 2017.

Jeffrey Lewis of the California-based Middlebury Institute of International Studies told Reuters that the blast is estimated to be at least 20 to 30 kt. The article has since been republished by some international media outlets. Such a yield would make the blast more powerful than that of the Little Boy atomic bomb dropped on Hiroshima in 1945.

The German Federal Institute for Geosciences and Natural Resources has initially estimated the yield as 25 kt.

The Japanese military dispatched two Kawasaki T-4 aircraft fitted with special containers to measure airborne radioactivity.

On 10 September 2016, academics from the University of Science and Technology of China released their findings based on seismic results; they concluded that the Nuclear Test Location is at 41°17'54.60N, 129°4'40.80E on 00:30:01.366 UTC, only a few hundred meters apart from the previous three tests (2009, 2013 and January 2016) with the estimated yield at 17.8 ±5.9 kt (An estimated yield between 11.9 kt to 23.7kt).

In August 2017, Siegfried S. Hecker, former director of the Los Alamos National Laboratory, estimated yield as between 15 and 25 kilotons.

== North Korean response ==
The North Korea state media did not immediately announce the test, instead showing archive footage of the country's founder, Kim Il Sung, as well as of his son and successor Kim Jong Il.

By 13:50 Pyongyang Standard Time, state media KCNA confirmed that this was the fifth nuclear test and that the "warhead can be mounted to a missile".

== International response ==
The test, conducted in defiance of the international community, prompted wide international condemnation.

The UN Security Council condemned the test and said it would formulate a new resolution, with the U.S., United Kingdom, and France pressing for new sanctions. U.S. Secretary of Defense Ash Carter stated in a press conference that "China has and shares an important responsibility for this development and has an important responsibility to reverse it". China has not confirmed its support for tougher sanctions. University of Tokyo professor Tadashi Kimiya told Reuters: "Sanctions have already been imposed on almost everything possible, so the policy is at an impasse. In reality, the means by which the United States, South Korea and Japan can put pressure on North Korea have reached their limits".

U.S. President Barack Obama, South Korean president Park Geun-hye and Japanese prime minister Shinzō Abe agreed to jointly "take additional significant steps, including new sanctions, to demonstrate to North Korea that there are consequences to its unlawful and dangerous actions". The U.S., South Korea and Japan immediately called an emergency closed-door meeting of the United Nations Security Council; in a statement issued on September 9, the Council strongly condemned the test and said that it would take "further significant measures" in response, as it had pledged to do in a previous resolution if a violation occurred again. The statement said that non-military actions such as sanctions would be taken under Article 41 of the United Nations Charter.

== See also ==
- List of nuclear weapons tests of North Korea
- List of states with nuclear weapons
- North Korea and weapons of mass destruction
- Treaty on the Non-Proliferation of Nuclear Weapons
