= 2017 North Korean nuclear test =

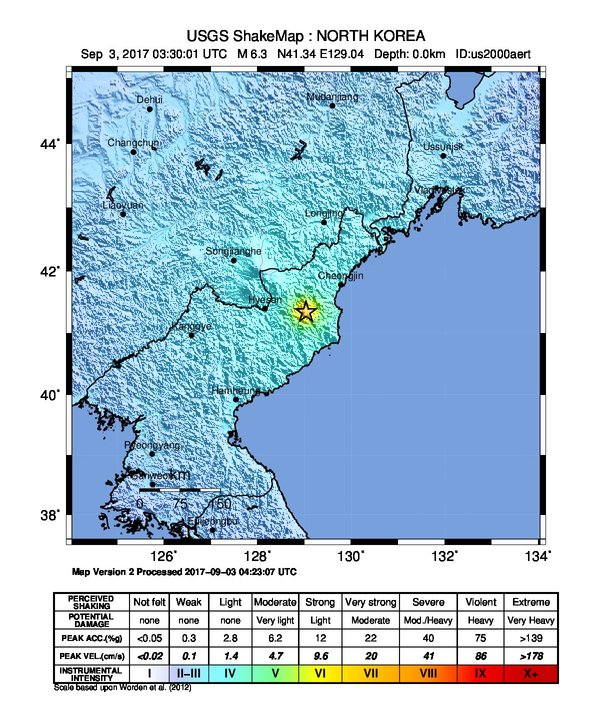
- Graphic from the United States Geological Survey showing the location of seismic activity at the time of the test

Information
- Country: North Korea
- Test site: Punggye-ri Nuclear Test Site, Kilju County
- Coordinates: 41.332°N 129.030°E
- Period: 12:00, 3 September 2017 UTC+08:30 (03:30:01 UTC)
- Number of tests: 1
- Max. yield: ~50–60 kilotons of TNT (210–250 TJ) based on Korea Meteorological Administration to ~160–400 kilotons of TNT (670–1,670 TJ) based on International Monitoring System seismic station data

Test chronology

Location of North Korea's nuclear tests
1: 2006; 2: 2009; 3: 2013; 4: 2016-01; 5: 2016-09; 6: 2017;
V

North Korea conducted its sixth (and most recent to date) nuclear test on 3 September 2017, claiming it had tested a thermonuclear weapon (hydrogen bomb). While unconfirmed, analysts agree the test was likely of a thermonuclear or boosted fission weapon. The test took place at a high point of the 2017–2018 North Korea crisis.

The United States Geological Survey reported an earthquake of 6.3 magnitude not far from North Korea's Punggye-ri nuclear test site. South Korean authorities said the earthquake seemed to be artificial, consistent with an underground nuclear test. The USGS, as well as China Earthquake Networks Center, reported that the initial event was followed by a second, smaller, earthquake at the site, several minutes later, which was characterized as a collapse of the cavity formed by the initial detonation.

While early intelligence and academic reports suggested yields between 100 and 160 kilotons of TNT, later yield estimates were between 250 and 400 kilotons. Via the International Monitoring System, it was the first underground test where infrasound signatures were recorded transiting the thermosphere. North Korea had previously claimed it tested a hydrogen bomb in January 2016, but this was widely discounted by experts. Analysts were more favorable to a true thermonuclear weapon explanation for the 2017 test, while yield estimates reach the upper limits of the largest pure fission or largest boosted fission weapons ever tested.

The test was internationally condemned by countries throughout Asia, as well as the five permanent members of the United Nations Security Council. Japan and South Korea announced new missile defense measures, with South Korea seeking Terminal High Altitude Area Defense batteries from the United States. In November, the United States relisted North Korea as a State Sponsor of Terrorism.

In April 2018, North Korea announced a unilateral nuclear and intercontinental ballistic missile testing moratorium. From 2021 the country extensively tested cruise missiles and short-range ballistic missiles, and in 2023 resumed ICBM tests, while as of 2026 this remains the most recent confirmed nuclear test in the world.

== Nuclear device ==
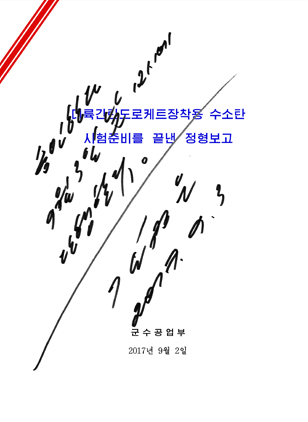
Order to conduct the test, signed by Kim Jong Un on 3 September 2017

The North Korean government announced that it had detonated a hydrogen (thermonuclear) bomb that could be loaded onto an intercontinental ballistic missile (ICBM). The announcement stated the warhead had a variable yield "the explosive power of which is adjustable from tens kiloton to hundreds kiloton [sic] ... [and] which can be detonated even at high altitudes for super-powerful EMP attack". A later technical announcement called the device a "two-stage thermo-nuclear weapon" and stated experimental measurements were fully compatible with the design specification, and there had been no leakage of radioactive materials from the underground nuclear test.

Photographs of North Korean leader Kim Jong Un inspecting a device resembling a thermonuclear warhead were released a few hours before the test.

Analysts have tended to give credence to North Korea's claim that it was a hydrogen bomb. 38 North made a revised estimate for the test yield at 250 kT, making it near the maximum-containable yield for the Punggye-ri test site. Tom Plant, director of proliferation and nuclear policy at the Royal United Services Institute said, "The North Koreans do bluff sometimes, but when they make a concrete claim about their nuclear programme, more often than not it turns out to be true. ... I think the balance is in favour of it being a thermonuclear bomb rather than a conventional atom bomb."

Others have been skeptical that it was a completely successful test of a true hydrogen bomb as North Korea claimed. Determining whether it is a two-stage thermonuclear bomb or a fusion-boosted fission weapon may not be possible without radionuclide emission data. The yield estimates of less than 300 kT would be lower than any other nation's first test of a fusion-primary thermonuclear device, which would typically be in the 1000 kT range, while boosted fission weapons and variable-yield nuclear devices can be as low as hundreds of tons, but are not considered true hydrogen bombs; meanwhile the largest pure-fission bomb tested by the United States of America was Ivy King at 500 kT. An October 2 Scientific American article said the test was "estimated to have been a 160-kiloton detonation — far below an H-bomb's capabilities." The UK has the record for the largest (boosted) fission bomb ever tested at 720 kT, dubbed Orange Herald. Martin Navias of the Centre for Defence Studies at King's College London noted that the breakthroughs needed to get from a fission to a fusion device would have to be done by the North Koreans on their own – China, Russia, Pakistan, and Iran would not or could not help.

Jane's Information Group estimates a North Korean thermonuclear Teller-Ulam type bomb would weigh between 250–360 kilograms (550–790 lb).

As of January 2018, there have been no official announcements from the United States confirming or contradicting the detonation of a hydrogen bomb. However, on 15 September 2017 John E. Hyten, head of U.S. Strategic Command, said, "When I look at a thing this size, I as a military officer assume that it's a hydrogen bomb."

== Effects ==
=== Earthquake ===
2017 North Korea earthquake
- Location within North Korea
- UTC time: 2017-09-03 03:30:01
- ISC event: 616640329
- USGS-ANSS: ComCat
- Local date: 3 September 2017
- Local time: 12:30
- Magnitude: 6.3 mb
- Depth: 0.0 km (0 mi)
- Epicenter: 41.332°N 129.030°E
- Type: Nuclear explosion
- Max. intensity: MMI VI (Strong)
- Casualties: "Dozens" killed and injured

The nuclear test caused a 6.3 magnitude earthquake in Punggye village, which resulted in the collapse of several civilian buildings. The explosion from the nuclear test triggered aftershocks within eight minutes, damaging structures in a nearby village. Dozens of people were reported to be killed or injured due to the earthquake. Among them were several children who were killed when their school collapsed. The North Korean government received harsh criticism after being accused of not warning civilians of the nuclear test as several children were in school when the earthquake took place. The impact also hit local farmers.

=== Infrasound ===
A January 2019 paper by German geologists examined the infrasound signatures of the test detectable by the International Monitoring System. Two separate infrasound signals were detected at the I45RU station, 401 km away in Russia. One indicated stratospheric ducting i.e. a turning height of the signal between 40 and 55 km, and the other indicated thermospheric ducting i.e. above 100 km through outer space. This was the first ever detection of thermospheric path of acoustic signals from an underground nuclear explosion.

=== Radionuclides ===
The January 2019 paper also examined xenon-133 radionuclides collected by the system. Those in September do not indicate a radioactive release from the test site, but those for October are consistent with delayed small releases, while not being conclusive. Additionally, researchers in Xi'an, China examining local levels of carbon-14 and iodine-129 isotopes could not conclude a detectable radioactive leakage.

== Yield estimates ==
On the day of the test the chief of the South Korean parliament's defense committee, Kim Young-Woo, stated the nuclear yield was equivalent to about 100 kilotons of TNT (100 kt): "The North's latest test is estimated to have a yield of up to 100 kilotons, though it is a provisional report." The independent seismic monitoring agency NORSAR estimated that the blast had a yield of about 120 kilotons, based on a seismic magnitude of 5.8.

On 4 September, the academics from the University of Science and Technology of China released their findings based on seismic results and concluded that the nuclear test occurred at 41°17′53.52″N 129°4′27.12″E at 03:30 UTC, only a few hundred meters from the four previous tests (2009, 2013, January 2016 and September 2016) with the estimated yield at 108.1 ± 48.1 kt.

On 5 September, the Japanese government gave a yield estimate of about 160 kilotons, based on analysing Comprehensive Nuclear-Test-Ban Treaty Organization seismic data, replacing an early estimate of 70 kilotons.

On 6 September, an early assessment by U.S. Intelligence that the yield was 140 kilotons, with an undisclosed margin of error, was reported. On 13 September, U.S. Intelligence was reported referring to an early yield estimate range of 70 to 280 kilotons made by the Air Force Technical Applications Center.

On 12 September, NORSAR revised its estimate of the earthquake magnitude upward to 6.1, matching that of the CTBTO, but less powerful than the USGS estimate of 6.3. Its yield estimate was revised to 250 kilotons, while noting the estimate had some uncertainty and an undisclosed margin of error.

On 13 September, an analysis of before and after synthetic-aperture radar satellite imagery of the test site was published suggesting the test occurred under 900 metres (3,000 ft) of rock and the yield "could have been in excess of 300 kilotons".

In January 2019 a paper by German geologists using seismic station data of the International Monitoring System concluded a yield estimate of 400 kilotons, but noted it as an upper limit due to possible overestimation from other seismic effects, giving a lower yield estimate of 160 kilotons.

In October 2019 a paper by the Indian Space Research Organization was published using satellite interferometric synthetic-aperture radar data to analyse surface deformations using Bayesian modelling to reduce uncertainties. It found that the explosion depth was 542 ± 30 metres below Mount Mantap, and the yield was 245–271 kilotons.

== Reactions ==
The United Nations Security Council met in an open emergency meeting on 4 September 2017, at the request of the US, South Korea, Japan, France and the UK.

Canada, China, Indonesia, Japan, Malaysia, the Philippines, Russia, Singapore, South Korea, and the United States voiced strong criticism of the nuclear test.

US President Donald Trump wrote on Twitter: "North Korea has conducted a major nuclear test. Their words and actions continue to be very hostile and dangerous to the United States". Trump was asked whether the US would attack North Korea and replied: "We'll see." Defense Secretary James Mattis warned North Korea that it would be met with a "massive military response" if it threatened the United States or its allies.

== See also ==
- List of earthquakes in 2017
- List of nuclear weapons tests
- List of nuclear weapons tests of North Korea
