= List of nuclear weapons tests of North Korea =

Nuclear tests conducted by North Korea since 2006

Nuclear tests

Information
- Country: North Korea
- Test site: Punggye-ri Nuclear Test Site, North Korea
- Period: 2006–2017
- Number of tests: 6
- Test type: underground
- Max. yield: ~140 kt (U.S. intelligence); 160 kt (Revised estimates from Japanese Government); 250 kt (38 North and revised NORSAR estimate)

North Korea has conducted six nuclear tests, in 2006, 2009, 2013, twice in 2016, and in 2017.

Location of North Korea's nuclear tests
1: 2006; 2: 2009; 3: 2013; 4: 2016-01; 5: 2016-09; 6: 2017;
V

== Testing ==
North Korea's nuclear tests series tests and detonations
Sequence	Date time (UT)	Local time zone (Note: To convert the UT time into standard local, add the number of hours in parentheses to the UT time; for local daylight saving time, add one additional hour. If the result is earlier than 00:00, add 24 hours and subtract 1 from the day; if it is 24:00 or later, subtract 24 hours and add 1 to the day. North Korea changed from UTC+9 hours to UTC+8:30 hours on 15 August 2015. All historical time zone data are derived from here:)	Location	Elevation + height	Delivery	Yield (Note: Estimated energy yield in tons, kilotons, and megatons. A ton of TNT equivalent is defined as 4.184 gigajoules (1 gigacalorie).)	Fallout (Note: Radioactive emission to the atmosphere aside from prompt neutrons, where known. The measured species is only iodine-131 if mentioned, otherwise it is all species. No entry means unknown, probably none if underground and "all" if not; otherwise notation for whether measured on the site only or off the site, where known, and the measured amount of radioactivity released.)	References
(1)	9 October 2006 01:35:27	KST (+9 hrs)	Punggye-ri Test Site, North Korea 41.28505°N 129.1084°E	1,340 m (4,400 ft), −310 m (−1,020 ft)	underground	0.7–2 kt		
(1)	Possibly a fizzle. East Tunnel approximately 1 km NE from the entrance.; The Federal Institute for Geosciences and Natural Resources, a state-run geology research institute in Germany, estimated the yield at 2 kilotons in 2013 but has since revised to 0.7 kt.; The International Seismological Centre has a bibliography and/or authoritative data for this event.							
(2)	25 May 2009 00:54:43	KST (+9 hrs)	Punggye-ri Test Site, North Korea 41.29142°N 129.08167°E	1,340 m (4,400 ft), −490 m (−1,610 ft)	underground	2–5.4 kt		
(2)	West Tunnel at about 1.2 km NW from the tunnel entrance.; The Federal Institute for Geosciences and Natural Resources, a state-run geology research institute in Germany, estimated the yield at 13 kt in 2013 but has since revised to 5.4 kt.; The International Seismological Centre has a bibliography and/or authoritative data for this event.							
(3)	12 February 2013 02:57:51	KST (+9 hrs)	Punggye-ri Test Site, North Korea 41.26809°N 129.08076°E	1,340 m (4,400 ft), −1,000 m (−3,300 ft)	underground	6–16 kt		
(3)	Likely the test took place in the West Tunnel. South tunnel damaged by flooding in 2012.; The Federal Institute for Geosciences and Natural Resources, a state-run geology research institute in Germany, estimated the yield at 40 kilotons in 2013 but has since revised the yield as 14 kt.; The University of Science and Technology of China estimates the yield at around 12.2 kt, with a margin of error of 3.8 kt. Hence the max yield could be 16 kt for this test.; The International Seismological Centre has a bibliography and/or authoritative data for this event.							
(4)	6 January 2016 01:30:01	PYT (+8:30 hrs)	Punggye-ri Test Site, North Korea 41.30900°N 129.03399°E	1,340 m (4,400 ft), −1,000 m (−3,300 ft)	underground	7–16.5 kt		
(4)	Claimed to be a hydrogen bomb.; Federal Institute for Geosciences and Natural Resources has originally estimated the yield as 14kt but has since revised to 10kt.; The University of Science and Technology of China estimates the yield at around 11.3 kt, with a margin of error of 4.2 kt. Hence the max yield could be 16.5 kt for this test.; The International Seismological Centre has a bibliography and/or authoritative data for this event.							
(5)	9 September 2016 00:30:01	PYT (+8:30 hrs)	Punggye-ri Test Site, North Korea 41.298°N 129.015°E (Note: Location from seismic data, about 6.4 km west northwest Punggye-ri and locus of previous tests.)	1,340 m (4,400 ft), −1,000 m (−3,300 ft)	underground	15–25 kt		
(5)	North Korea announced that this is a successful test of a warhead that can be mounted onto a rocket.; Siegfried S. Hecker, former director of Los Alamos National Laboratory, estimated yield at 15 to 25 kt.; Federal Institute for Geosciences and Natural Resources has initially estimated the yield as 25 kt.; The University of Science and Technology of China estimates the yield at around 17.8 kt, with a margin of error of 5.9 kt.; The International Seismological Centre will have authoritative data for this event in due course.							
(6)	3 September 2017 03:30:01.940	PYT (+8:30 hrs)	Punggye-ri Test Site, North Korea 41.343°N 129.036°E	1,340 m (4,400 ft), 0 m (0 ft)	underground	70–280 kt		
(6)	Claimed to be a hydrogen bomb (but may only be a boosted fission weapon rather than an actual staged Teller–Ulam thermonuclear weapon).; On 3 September, South Korea’s weather agency, the Korea Meteorological Administration, estimated that the nuclear weapons blast yield of the presumed test was between 50 and 60 kilotons based on a magnitude 5.6 detection.; South Korean government's initial yield estimate is 100 kt, and it detected a 5.7 magnitude earthquake.; NORSAR Seismology Center initial estimate is 120 kt, based on a magnitude 5.8 tremor. On 12 Sept 2017, this was revised to an estimate of 250 kt based on a magnitude 6.1 instead.; The German Federal Institute for Geosciences and Natural Resources estimate is "a few hundred kt", based on a 6.1 detected tremor. The Japan Meteorological Agency also detected a 6.1 magnitude tremor.; from USGS: "[Magnitude] 6.3 Explosion ... Possible explosion, located near the site where North Korea has detonated nuclear explosions in the past. If this event was an explosion, the USGS National Earthquake Information Center cannot determine its type, whether nuclear or any other possible type." Depth and lat/lon location approximate.; The China Earthquake Administration also detected a 6.3 magnitude earthquake.; The University of Science and Technology of China estimated the yield at 108.1 ± 48.1 kt.; The Geophysical Service of the Russian Academy of Sciences registered a 6.4 magnitude earthquake.; The Lamont–Doherty Earth Observatory estimated 250 kilotons.; Japanese Government: 160 kt.; U.S. Intelligence/Air Force Technical Applications Center: 70 to 280 kilotons. Earlier U.S. Intelligence had given an estimate of 140 kt with unspecified margin of error.; Indian Space Research Organization analysis of satellite synthetic-aperture radar data found that explosion was at a depth of 542 ± 30 metres and the yield was 245–271 kt.; The International Seismological Centre will have authoritative data for this event in due course.							

== Summary ==
North Korea's nuclear testing series summary
Series or years	Years covered	Tests (Note: Includes all tests with potential for nuclear fission or fusion explosion, including combat use, singleton tests, salvo tests, zero yield fails, safety experiments, and bombs incapacitated by accidents but still intended to be fired. It does not include hydronuclear and subcritical tests, and misfires of a device which was subsequently fired successfully.)	Devices fired	Devices with unknown yield	Peaceful use tests	Non-PTBT tests (Note: Number of tests which would have been in violation of the Partial Test Ban Treaty of 1963, such as atmospheric, space or underwater tests. Some "peaceful use" cratering tests which should have been violations were protested, and later quietly dropped.)	Yield range (kilotons) (Note: "Small" refers to a value greater than zero but less than 0.5 kt.)	Total yield (kilotons) (Note: Some yields are described like "< 20 kt"; such are scored at one half of the numeric amount, i.e., yield of 10k in this example. "Unknown yield" adds nothing to the total.)	Notes
nuclear tests	2006–2017	6	6				0.7–250	197.8	
Totals	2006-Oct-9 to 2017-Sep-3	6	6				0.7–250	197.8 (Based on average yield from lower to upper estimates as the Government of DPRK does not announce the exact yield.)	Total country yield is 0.036% of all nuclear testing.

== See also ==
- North Korea and weapons of mass destruction

== Sources ==
- Yang, Xiaoping; North, Robert; Romney, Carl (August 2000), CMR Nuclear Explosion Database (Revision 3), SMDC Monitoring Research
- Andryushi, LA; Voloshin, N.P.; Ilkaev, R.I.; Matushchenko, A.M.; Ryabev, L.D.; Strukov, V.G.; Chernyshev, A.K.; Yudin, Yu.A., Mikhailov, V.N. (ed.), Catalog of Worldwide Nuclear Testing, archived from the original on 19 December 2013
- Wm Robert Johnston, PhD, Johnston Archive of Nuclear Weapons
