= January 2016 North Korean nuclear test =

Detonation on 6 January 2016

January 2016 North Korea nuclear test

Information
- Country: North Korea
- Test site: 41.308°N 129.049°E, Punggye-ri Nuclear Test Site, Kilju County
- Period: 10:00, 6 January 2016 UTC+08:30 (01:30:01 UTC)
- Number of tests: 1
- Test type: Underground
- Device type: Hydrogen according to the DPRK, fission according to the South Korean National Intelligence Service
- Max. yield: Not announced by DPRK; Estimated at least 7 kilotons of TNT (29 TJ) similar to the 2013 test due to the same magnitude scale as the previous test.; 10 kilotons of TNT (42 TJ) (Estimation from Federal Institute for Geosciences and Natural Resources) – which was revised from initial estimates of 14 kilotons of TNT (59 TJ); 7.1–15.5 kilotons of TNT (30–65 TJ) kt University of Science and Technology of China

Test chronology

Location of North Korea's nuclear tests
1: 2006; 2: 2009; 3: 2013; 4: 2016-01; 5: 2016-09; 6: 2017;
V

North Korea conducted its fourth nuclear detonation on 6 January 2016 at 10:00:01 UTC+08:30. At the Punggye-ri Nuclear Test Site, approximately 50 kilometres (30 miles) northwest of Kilju City in Kilju County, an underground nuclear test was carried out. The United States Geological Survey reported a 5.1 magnitude earthquake from the location; the China Earthquake Networks Center reported the magnitude as 4.9.

North Korean media announced that the country had successfully tested a hydrogen bomb in "self-defence against US". However, third-party experts as well as officials and agencies in South Korea questioned North Korea's claims and contend that the device was more likely to have been a fission bomb such as a boosted fission weapon. Such weapons use hydrogen fusion to produce smaller, lighter warheads suitable for arming a delivery device such as a missile, rather than to attain the destructive power of a true hydrogen bomb.

== Background ==
North Korea had previously conducted three underground nuclear tests in 2006, 2009, and 2013, drawing sanctions from the United Nations Security Council.

The presidents of the United States and South Korea urged North Korea to rejoin the six-party talks in October 2015. The presidents also warned North Korea against a fourth nuclear test.

In December 2015 North Korean supreme leader Kim Jong Un suggested that the country had the capacity to launch a hydrogen bomb, a device of considerably more power than conventional atomic bombs used in previous tests. The remark was met with skepticism from the White House and South Korean officials. Around this time, the country approached the United States about possible peace talks to end the Korean War.

In a New Year's Day speech, Kim Jong Un warned that provocation from "invasive outsiders" would be met with a "holy war of justice".

== North Korean claims ==
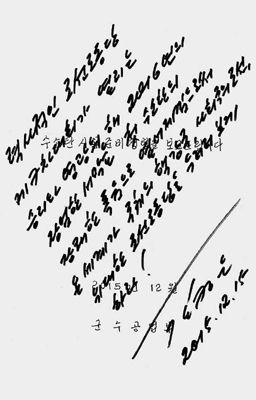
Order to prepare the test signed by Kim Jong Un on 15 December 2015, the month before the test

The North Korean government described the test as a "complete success" and characterized it as self-defense against the United States. North Korean media claimed that the bomb was made the month before the test was carried out.

Official state media from the DPRK announced the test. The Korean Central Television (KCTV) said that "the U.S. has gathered forces hostile to [the] DPRK and raised a slanderous human rights issue to hinder [the] DPRK's improvement. It is [therefore] just to have [an] H-bomb as self-defense against the U.S. having numerous and humongous nuclear weapons. The DPRK's fate must not be protected by any forces but [the] DPRK itself".

Ri Chun-hee, the television news anchor who announced the deaths of Kim Il Sung and Kim Jong Il, emerged from retirement to announce the H-bomb test to both the domestic and international audience.

== Skepticism of the hydrogen bomb claim ==
The earthquake caused by the 2016 nuclear test was 5.1 magnitude, similar to the 5.1-magnitude earthquake that accompanied North Korea's previous 2013 nuclear test (which was estimated by South Korea to have a yield of 6–9 kilotons of TNT and Russian estimates of more than 7 kilotons of TNT).

Won-Young Kim at the Lamont–Doherty Earth Observatory explained it "was more powerful than North Korea's previous nuclear test" and added that it is difficult to quantify "the exact size of North Korea's nuclear detonations because the depth of the explosive device, properties of the rock surrounding the explosion and other factors influence the seismic measurements produced" because North Korea does not publicize the depth of its tests, although the material at the Punggye-ri Nuclear Test Site is thought to be hard granite.

The tremors were felt in Changbai, Hunchun and Yanji in Jilin province in China. China Central Television released photos of students being evacuated in the area and stated that the ground at a local high school showed cracks. According to China's Foreign Ministry, Beijing had no advance knowledge of the test.

Although North Korea declared that the 2016 test was a "successful" demonstration of a hydrogen bomb, international experts and members of the South Korean government expressed skepticism because the explosion was too small; rather, the test may have involved only a boosted fission weapon.

Andre Gsponer of the Independent Scientific Research Institute at the University of Oxford said this technology has "a number of significant technical and military advantages, which explain why it is used in essentially all militarized nuclear weapons, including in India, Pakistan, and North Korea". Quick estimates of the impact of such a weapon "detonated 1,000 meters over downtown Seoul would produce 78,000 fatalities and somewhere around 270,000 estimated injuries", according to Ryan Faith of ViceNews. Analyst Zack Beauchamp of Vox points out that yield and technology in this test "won't fundamentally change the status quo in the Korean peninsula and it would be more a change in degree than in kind in military terms".

Bruce W. Bennett, a senior defense analyst of the RAND Corporation research organization, is also skeptical, telling BBC News that "the bang they should have gotten would have been 10 times greater… So Kim Jong-un is either lying, saying they did a hydrogen test when they didn't, they just used a little bit more efficient fission weapon – or the hydrogen part of the test really didn't work very well, or the fission part didn't work very well." After considering the seismic data which suggests a 6–9 kiloton yield, other U.S. analysts also do not believe that a hydrogen bomb was detonated. "What we're speculating is they tried to do a boosted nuclear device, which is an atomic bomb that has a little bit of hydrogen, an isotope in it called tritium," said Joseph Cirincione, president of the global security firm Ploughshares Fund.

On the other hand, John Carlson, a member of the Nuclear Fuel Cycle Royal Commission and former head of the Australian Safeguards and Non-Proliferation Office declared previous North Korean tests were purely a primary stage, that is, a nuclear explosion, "and fairly low yield at that". However, in the case of this test, he added that "if it's true, it means they have made something (of a) smaller scale, capable of being put on to a missile" and that North Korea would be aiming to develop a weapon "small enough and light enough to put on to a missile, and the usual parameters are something less than one meter in diameter, and less than a tonne in weight".

Admiral Bill Gortney, head of US Northern Command and the North American Aerospace Defense Command, said in October 2015 he believed North Korea had rockets with enough range to hit the continental US and added that "the secretive state had already developed 'miniaturised' nuclear bombs that could be fitted to these rockets". David Albright, former United Nations International Atomic Energy Agency nuclear inspector, on the contrary, thinks Pyongyang can miniaturize a warhead for shorter-range missiles, but not yet for intercontinental ballistic missiles, or ICBMs.

There is a clear distinction between first- and second-generation nuclear weapons, i.e. atomic and hydrogen bombs. However, virtually all second generation bombs use a few grams of deuterium-tritium gas to ensure the reliability and safety of the nuclear fission-explosives. They can then be used on their own as boosted fission bombs or as primaries of two-stage thermonuclear (hydrogen) weapons. Weapons which in contemporary arsenals do not use tritium boosting have a generally lower kiloton yield and are mostly weapons used for specific purposes such as atomic demolition munitions. Tritium boosting is relatively easy to implement and has advantages in yield, weight, size, safety (zero or negligible yield when the tritium is not in the weapon), resistance to spontaneous fission caused by other warheads and high transparency to X-rays.

Jeffrey Lewis, expert at the Center for Nonproliferation Studies, said that a boosted fission weapon is "the most likely scenario in my view, with a failed thermonuclear test a close second".

== International reactions ==
The test was condemned by several governments who called on the United Nations to strengthen its sanctions against North Korea. China's Ministry of Foreign Affairs condemned the test, and said China had not known about it in advance, also calling on North Korea to engage in denuclearization. United Nations Security Council Resolution 2270 was subsequently passed to that effect.

== See also ==
- List of nuclear weapons tests of North Korea
- List of states with nuclear weapons
- Treaty on the Non-Proliferation of Nuclear Weapons
