= LIAG Institute for Applied Geophysics =

Institute for applied geophysics

- English logo of the institute
- Established: 1948
- Focus: Applied geophysics
- Head: Martin Sauter
- Staff: 90 (2024)
- Address: Stilleweg 2, 30655 Hanover
- Location: Lower Saxony, Germany
- Website: liag-institut.de/en/

The LIAG Institute for Applied Geophysics (formerly Leibniz Institute for Applied Geophysics, abbreviated LIAG), is an independent, non-university research institute for applied geophysics based in Hanover, Germany.

Together with the Federal Institute for Geosciences and Natural Resources and the german State Authority for Mining, Energy and Geology (LBEG) it forms the Geozentrum Hannover ("Geocenter Hanover").

Until the end of 2019, LIAG was part of the Leibniz Association as the Leibniz Institute for Applied Geophysics. After the end of its membership, the state of Lower Saxony considered LIAG to be an essential part of the national research landscape and therefore took over its funding at the end of federal and state funding in 2023. By implementing the recommendations from the last evaluation, including the future workshop, the aim is to reintegrate LIAG into the Leibniz Association. The name of the institute is still embedded in law as the Leibniz Institute for Applied Geophysics and LIAG Institute for Applied Geophysics is only a brand of the institute, but the research institution is increasingly appearing under this name in public.

The LIAG primarily investigates economically viable geological strata in Germany, for example, for use in geothermal energy or resource exploration, but it also conducts international research projects, such as in climate research. Mostly seismic and magnetic methods are employed.

== Research ==
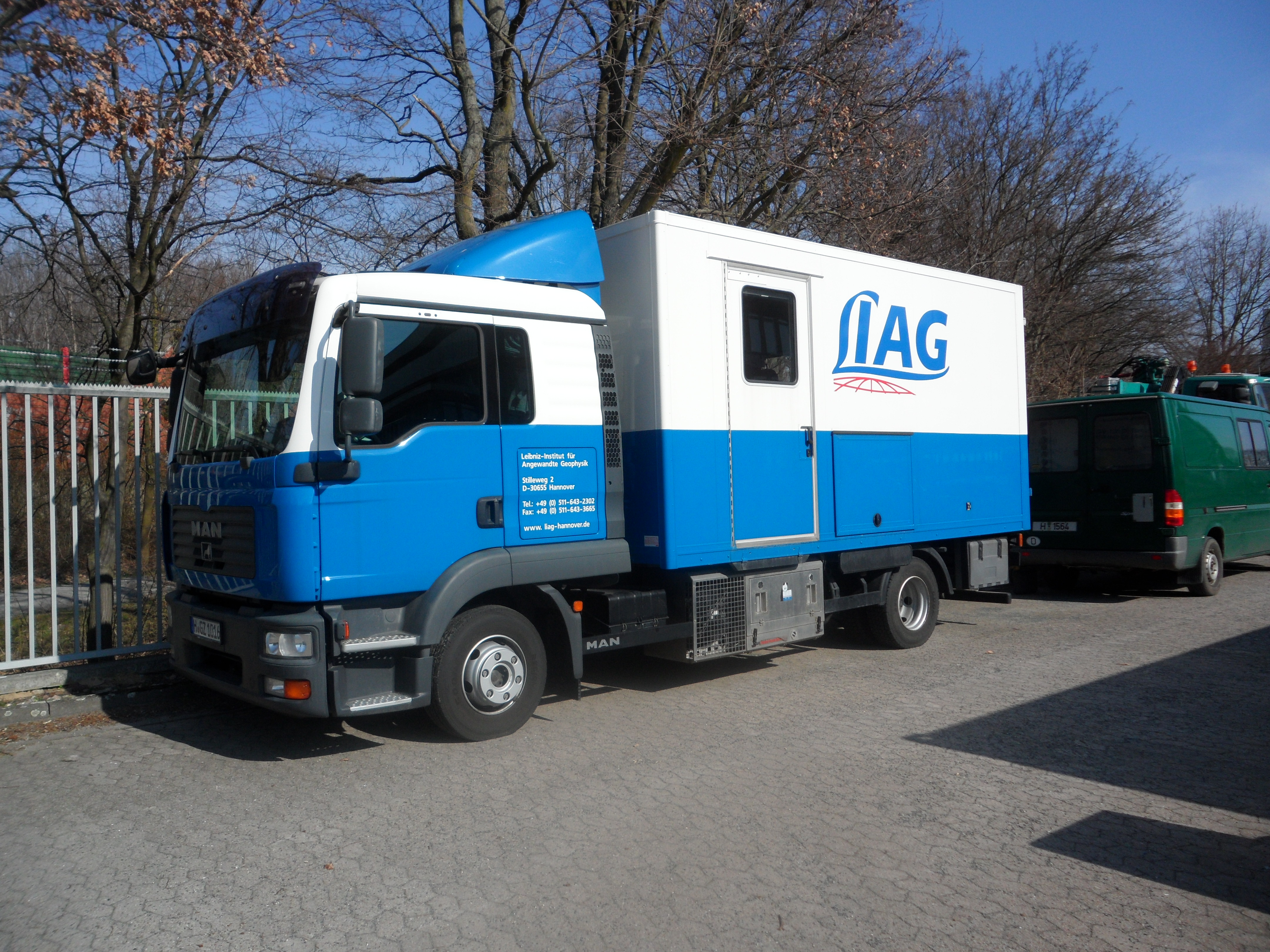
LIAG-truck

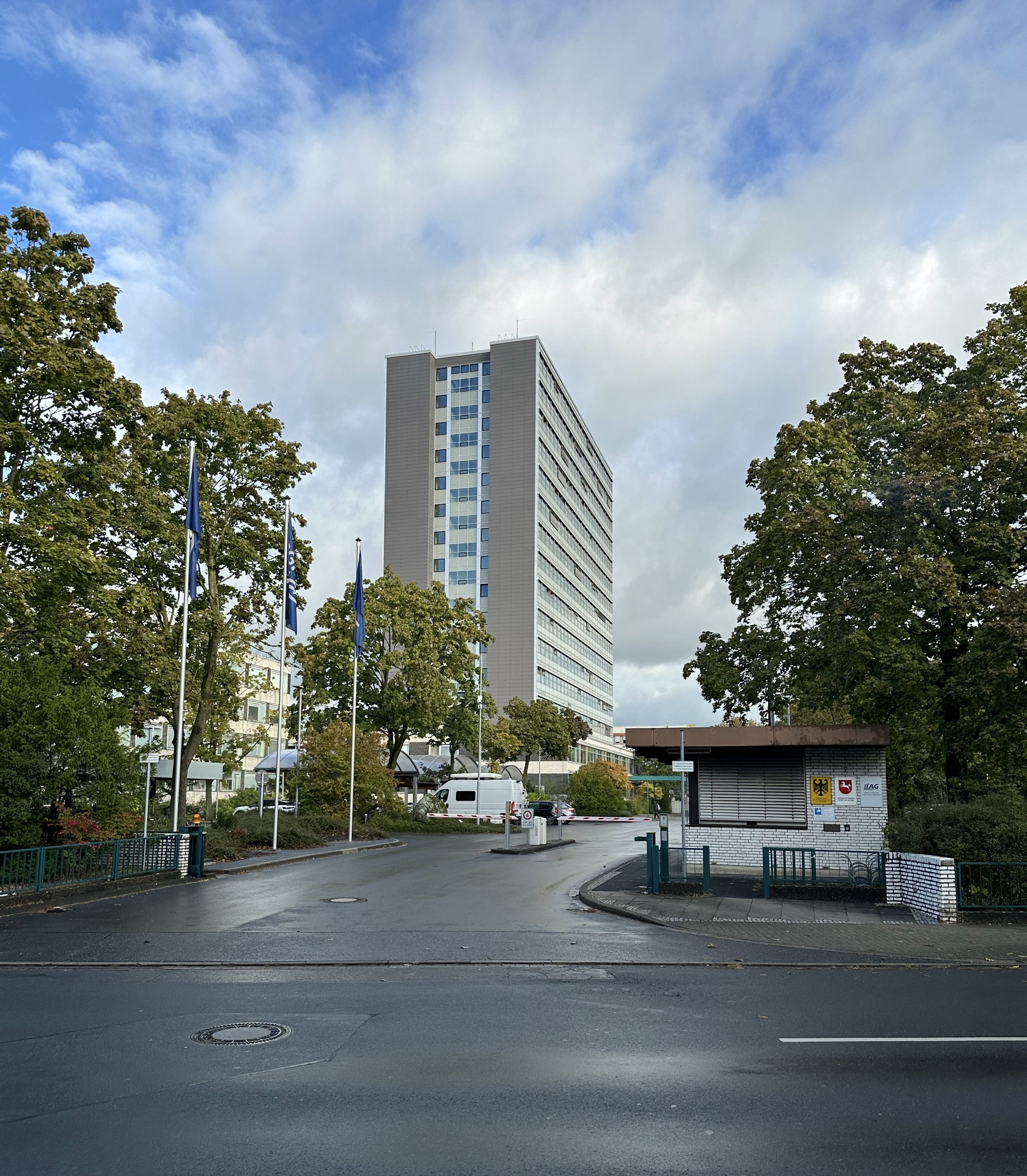
Headquarters in Hanover

The primary research goal is the investigation of processes in the subsurface that can be influenced by human activity, both in anticipation of and as a result of economic use, as well as for public welfare and environmental protection. Accordingly, the central areas of focus involve the exploration of subsurface structures and conditions, including their development over space and time. LIAG coordinates research activities both domestically and internationally and collaborates with geological services at the federal and state levels, universities, research institutions, and industry.

The institute concentrates its work on temporary, thematically oriented research priorities within the field of physical geosciences. The current focal areas are:

- Structure, quality, and processes of groundwater systems, such as the dynamics of groundwater in large-scale subsurface channel systems
- Geothermal energy: research in preparation for the economic use of geothermal energy, such as the productivity of deep, geothermally usable aquifers
- Structure, genesis, and age of terrestrial sedimentary systems, such as the thickest Quaternary deposits in the Upper Rhine Graben
- Methodological developments: research into the development of measurement and evaluation methods in the disciplines of seismics, gravimetry, geomagnetics, geoelectrics, electromagnetics, geothermics, rock physics, geochronology, isotope hydrology, borehole geophysics, information systems, and others

LIAG operates the Fachinformationssystem Geophysik (Geophysical Information System) and the Geothermische Informationssystem (GeotIS) (Geothermal Information System GeotIS) for storing its own and other geophysical measurement data and making them available.

== History ==
=== Geowissenschaftliche Gemeinschaftsaufgaben: 1948 – 2008 ===
The Leibniz Institute for Applied Geophysics (LIAG) originated from the "Geowissenschaftlichen Gemeinschaftsaufgaben" (GGA, common geosciences tasks) department, established in 1948. From 1950 to 1958, the GGA was part of the Office for Soil Research (AfB), where the geological state offices of Lower Saxony and North Rhine-Westphalia assigned the GGA the supra-regional tasks—the "Gemeinschaftsaufgaben". Through an administrative agreement between the Federal Republic of Germany and the State of Lower Saxony, the Federal Institute for Soil Research (BfB, part of the Federal Ministry of Economics, now the BGR) was established in 1958 in Hanover, originating from the AfB in Hanover. However, the GGA initially remained within the AfB and, after its dissolution in 1959, became part of its successor, the Lower Saxony State Office for Soil Research (NLfB). In January 1977 the GGA was granted the status of a "Blue List" institution and subsequently received funding accordingly. In December 1999, the GGA Institute was officially established as an independent research institution. At the end of 2004, the GGA successfully passed the evaluation of the Leibniz Association with very good results.

=== Leibniz Institute for Applied Geophysics: 2008 – 2024 ===
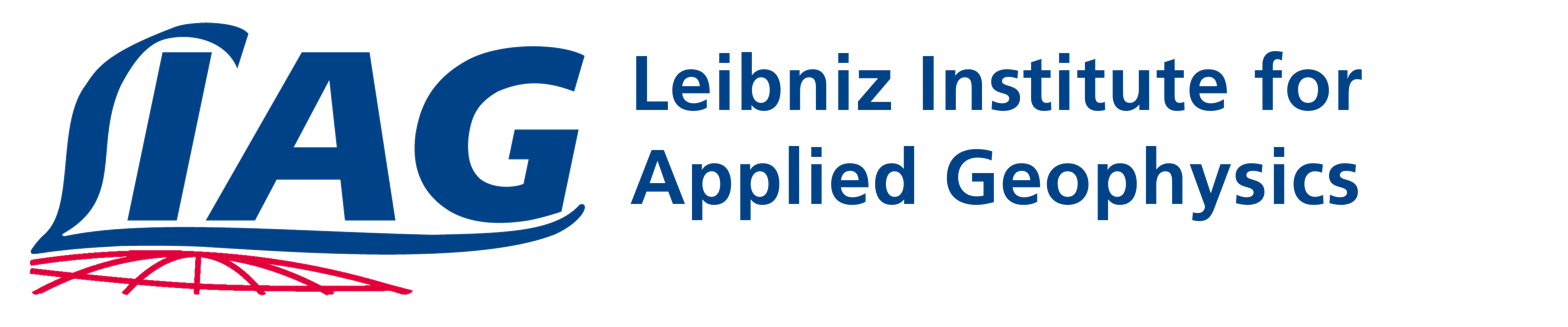
Logo from 2008 until 2024

In December 2008, the institute was renamed the Leibniz Institute for Applied Geophysics (LIAG). From then on, LIAG, together with the BGR and LBEG, formed the Geozentrum Hannover. In November 2011, LIAG once again passed an evaluation with very good results. However, following a negative evaluation at the end of 2018, the Senate of the Leibniz Association recommended in March 2019 that LIAG should no longer receive funding as a member. At the beginning of 2020, LIAG’s membership in the Leibniz Association officially ended. At the same time, the state of Lower Saxony ensured the continuation of funding, although the federal-state funding was discontinued in 2023. As of early 2023, the funding shifted from the federal-state model (50% federal, 37.5% Lower Saxony, and 12.5% other federal states) to full funding by the state of Lower Saxony. At the beginning of 2024, LIAG’s working groups were restructured so that, instead of five sections, it has since comprised three research divisions, each with two research departments.

=== LIAG Institute for Applied Geophysics: 2024 – today ===
Logo since 2024

Since March 2024, LIAG is operating under a new name and logo in order to distinguish itself from the Leibniz Association. Because the former affiliation remained embedded in statutory texts, references to the Leibniz Association persisted for around four years after LIAG’s membership had ended. The appointment to lead one of the new research departments established in 2024 was suspended by the Hanover Administrative Court in late 2025 on the grounds of a possible conflict of interest involving the institute’s director.
