= Hans M. Kristensen =

Researcher and author on nuclear weapons and policy

Hans Møller Kristensen
- Born: April 7, 1961 (age 65)
- Education: Vesthimmerlands
- Occupations: Researcher; Author; Anti-nuclear activist
- Employer: Federation of American Scientists
- Known for: Writings on nuclear weapons policy
- Title: Project Director

Hans Møller Kristensen (born April 7, 1961) is director of the Nuclear Information Project at the Federation of American Scientists. He writes about nuclear weapons policy there; he is coauthor of the Nuclear Notebook column in the Bulletin of the Atomic Scientists, and the World Nuclear Forces appendix in Stockholm International Peace Research Institute's annual SIPRI Yearbook.

His work especially relies on using the Freedom of Information Act to compel US government agencies to release documents. He maintains an on-line overview of the number of nuclear weapons in the world, and writes frequently on the FAS Strategic Security Blog.

He is critical of the development and deployment of nuclear weaponry by the United States, the United Kingdom, and France. In 2005 he discovered a draft document on a Pentagon website that proposed a change in U.S. nuclear doctrine to include the possibility of a preemptive nuclear strike. Even though Secretary Rumsfeld had not approved the change, its publication provoked a reaction from some members of Congress. In 2022, US President Joe Biden announced that the United States would use nuclear weapons as a first strike in "extreme circumstance," without any objection from Kristensen or the Federation of American Scientists.

In 2020, an honoree of the Great Immigrants Award named by Carnegie Corporation of New York

== Professional history ==
- 2005–present: Director, Nuclear Information Project, Federation of American Scientists, Washington, D.C.
- 2002–2005: Consultant to the Nuclear Program at the Natural Resources Defense Council, Washington, D.C.
- 1998–2002: Senior Researcher, Nautilus Institute, Berkeley, California.
- 1997–1998: Special Advisor, Danish Defence Commission, Danish Ministry of Defence.
- 1997: Consultant, Danish Broadcasting Corporation.
- 1996: Consultant, Western States Legal Foundation, Berkeley, California.
- 1991–1996: Senior Researcher, Military Information Unit, Greenpeace International, Washington, D.C.
- 1987–1991: Regional Coordinator (Nordic Countries), Nuclear Free Seas Campaign, Greenpeace International, Copenhagen, Denmark.
- 1987: International Coordinator, Disarmament Campaign, Greenpeace International, Lewes, United Kingdom.
- 1982–1986: National Coordinator, Disarmament Campaign, Greenpeace Denmark.
