= KPA =

KPA may refer to:

- Keele Postgraduate Association, Keele University, UK, formerly Keele Research Association (KRA)
- Kensington (Olympia) station, London, England, National Rail station code
- Kenya Ports Authority
- Kiln phosphoric acid, a dry process to produce phosphoric acid at high temperature in a kiln
- Kilopascal (kPa), a unit of pressure
- Known-plaintext attack, a method of cryptanalysis
- Korean People's Army, the armed forces of North Korea
- Aruba Police Force (Dutch: Korps Politie Aruba)
- Kosovo Property Agency
