= Exploration geophysics =

Applied branch of geophysics and economic geology

Exploration geophysics is an applied branch of geophysics and economic geology, which uses physical methods at the surface of the Earth, such as seismic, gravitational, magnetic, electrical and electromagnetic, to measure the physical properties of the subsurface, along with the anomalies in those properties. It is most often used to detect or infer the presence and position of economically useful geological deposits, such as ore minerals; fossil fuels and other hydrocarbons; geothermal reservoirs; and groundwater reservoirs. It can also be used to detect the presence of unexploded ordnance.

Exploration geophysics can be used to directly detect the target style of mineralization by measuring its physical properties directly. For example, one may measure the density contrasts between the dense iron ore and the lighter silicate host rock, or one may measure the electrical conductivity contrast between conductive sulfide minerals and the resistive silicate host rock.

== Geophysical methods ==
The main techniques used are:

1. Seismic tomography to locate earthquakes and assist in Seismology.
2. Reflection seismology and seismic refraction to map the surface structure of a region.
3. Geodesy and gravity techniques, including gravity gradiometry.
4. Magnetic techniques, including aeromagnetic surveys to map magnetic anomalies.
5. Electrical techniques, including electrical resistivity tomography and induced polarization.
6. Electromagnetic methods, such as magnetotellurics, ground penetrating radar, transient/time-domain electromagnetics, and SNMR.
7. Borehole geophysics, also called well logging.
8. Remote sensing techniques, including hyperspectral imaging and airborne geophysics.

Many other techniques, or methods of integration of the above techniques, have been developed and are currently used. However these are not as common due to cost-effectiveness, wide applicability, and/or uncertainty in the results produced.

== Uses ==
Exploration geophysics is also used to map the subsurface structure of a region, to elucidate the underlying structures, to recognize spatial distribution of rock units, and to detect structures such as faults, folds and intrusive rocks. This is an indirect method for assessing the likelihood of ore deposits or hydrocarbon accumulations.

Methods devised for finding mineral or hydrocarbon deposits can also be used in other areas such as monitoring environmental impact, imaging subsurface archaeological sites, ground water investigations, subsurface salinity mapping, civil engineering site investigations, and interplanetary imaging.

=== Mineral exploration ===
Magnetometric surveys can be useful in defining magnetic anomalies which represent ore (direct detection), or in some cases gangue minerals associated with ore deposits (indirect or inferential detection).

The most direct method of detection of ore via magnetism involves detecting iron ore mineralization via mapping magnetic anomalies associated with banded iron formations which usually contain magnetite in some proportion. Skarn mineralization, which often contains magnetite, can also be detected though the ore minerals themselves would be non-magnetic. Similarly, magnetite, hematite, and often pyrrhotite are common minerals associated with hydrothermal alteration, which can be detected to provide an inference that some mineralizing hydrothermal event has affected the rocks.

Gravity surveying can be used to detect dense bodies of rocks within host formations of less dense wall rocks. This can be used to directly detect Mississippi Valley Type ore deposits, IOCG ore deposits, iron ore deposits, skarn deposits, and salt diapirs which can form oil and gas traps.

Electromagnetic (EM) surveys can be used to help detect a wide variety of mineral deposits, especially base metal sulphides via detection of conductivity anomalies which can be generated around sulphide bodies in the subsurface. EM surveys are also used in diamond exploration (where the kimberlite pipes tend to have lower resistance than enclosing rocks), graphite exploration, palaeochannel-hosted uranium deposits (which are associated with shallow aquifers, which often respond to EM surveys in a conductive overburden). These are indirect inferential methods of detecting mineralization, as the commodity being sought is not directly conductive, or not sufficiently conductive to be measurable. EM surveys are also used in unexploded ordnance, archaeological, and geotechnical investigations.

Regional EM surveys are conducted via airborne methods, using either fixed-wing aircraft or helicopter-borne EM rigs. Surface EM methods are based mostly on Transient EM methods using surface loops with a surface receiver, or a downhole tool lowered into a borehole which transects a body of mineralization. These methods can map out sulphide bodies within the earth in three dimensions, and provide information to geologists to direct further exploratory drilling on known mineralization. Surface loop surveys are rarely used for regional exploration, however in some cases such surveys can be used with success (e.g.; SQUID surveys for nickel ore bodies).

Electric-resistance methods such as induced polarization methods can be useful for directly detecting sulfide bodies, coal, and resistive rocks such as salt and carbonates.

Seismic methods can also be used for mineral exploration, since they can provide high-resolution images of geologic structures hosting mineral deposits. It is not just surface seismic surveys which are used, but also borehole seismic methods. All in all, the usage of seismic methods for mineral exploration is steadily increasing.

=== Hydrocarbon exploration ===
Seismic reflection and refraction techniques are the most widely used geophysical technique in hydrocarbon exploration. They are used to map the subsurface distribution of stratigraphy and its structure which can be used to delineate potential hydrocarbon accumulations, both stratigraphic and structural deposits or "traps". Well logging is another widely used technique as it provides necessary high resolution information about rock and fluid properties in a vertical section, although they are limited in areal extent. This limitation in areal extent is the reason why seismic reflection techniques are so popular; they provide a method for interpolating and extrapolating well log information over a much larger area.

Gravity and magnetics are also used, with considerable frequency, in oil and gas exploration. These can be used to determine the geometry and depth of covered geological structures including uplifts, subsiding basins, faults, folds, igneous intrusions, and salt diapirs due to their unique density and magnetic susceptibility signatures compared to the surrounding rocks; the latter is particularly useful for metallic ores.

Remote sensing techniques, specifically hyperspectral imaging, have been used to detect hydrocarbon microseepages using the spectral signature of geochemically altered soils and vegetation.

Specifically at sea, two methods are used: marine seismic reflection and electromagnetic seabed logging (SBL). Marine magnetotellurics (mMT), or marine Controlled Source Electro-Magnetics (mCSEM), can provide pseudo-direct detection of hydrocarbons by detecting resistivity changes over geological traps (signalled by seismic surveys).

=== Civil engineering ===
==== Ground penetrating radar ====
Ground penetrating radar is a non-invasive technique, and is used within civil construction and engineering for a variety of uses, including detection of utilities (buried water, gas, sewerage, electrical and telecommunication cables), mapping of soft soils, overburden for geotechnical characterization, and other similar uses.

==== Spectral-Analysis-of-Surface-Waves ====
The Spectral-Analysis-of-Surface-Waves (SASW) method is another non-invasive technique, which is widely used in practice to detect the shear wave velocity profile of the soil. The SASW method relies on the dispersive nature of Raleigh waves in layered media, i.e., the wave-velocity depends on the load's frequency. A material profile, based on the SASW method, is thus obtained according to: a) constructing an experimental dispersion curve, by performing field experiments, each time using a different loading frequency, and measuring the surface wave-speed for each frequency; b) constructing a theoretical dispersion curve, by assuming a trial distribution for the material properties of a layered profile; c) varying the material properties of the layered profile, and repeating the previous step, until a match between the experimental dispersion curve, and the theoretical dispersion curve is attained. The SASW method renders a layered (one-dimensional) shear wave velocity profile for the soil.

===== Full waveform inversion =====
Full-waveform-inversion (FWI) methods are among the most recent techniques for geotechnical site characterization, and are still under continuous development. The method is fairly general, and is capable of imaging the arbitrarily heterogeneous compressional and shear wave velocity profiles of the soil.

Elastic waves are used to probe the site under investigation, by placing seismic vibrators on the ground surface. These waves propagate through the soil, and due to the heterogeneous geological structure of the site under investigation, multiple reflections and refractions occur. The response of the site to the seismic vibrator is measured by sensors (geophones), also placed on the ground surface. Two key-components are required for the profiling based on full-waveform inversion. These components are: a) a computer model for the simulation of elastic waves in semi-infinite domains; and b) an optimization framework, through which the computed response is matched to the measured response by iteratively updating an initially assumed material distribution for the soil.

===== Other techniques =====
Civil engineering can also use remote sensing information for topographical mapping, planning, and environmental impact assessment. Airborne electromagnetic surveys are also used to characterize soft sediments in planning and engineering roads, dams, and other structures.

Magnetotellurics has proven useful for delineating groundwater reservoirs, mapping faults around areas where hazardous substances are stored (e.g. nuclear power stations and nuclear waste storage facilities), and earthquake precursor monitoring in areas with major structures such as hydro-electric dams subject to high levels of seismic activity.

BS 5930 is the standard used in the UK as a code of practice for site investigations.

=== Archaeology ===
Ground penetrating radar can be used to map buried artifacts, such as graves, mortuaries, wreck sites, and other shallowly buried archaeological sites.

Ground magnetometric surveys can be used for detecting buried ferrous metals, useful in surveying shipwrecks, modern battlefields strewn with metal debris, and even subtle disturbances such as large-scale ancient ruins.

Sonar systems can be used to detect shipwrecks. Active sonar systems emit sound pulses into the water which then bounce off of objects and are returned to the sonar transducer. The sonar transducer is able to determine both the range and orientation of an underwater object by measuring the amount of time between the release of the sound pulse and its returned reception. Passive sonar systems are used to detect noises from marine objects or animals. This system does not emit sound pulses itself but instead focuses on sound detection from marine sources. This system simply 'listens' to the ocean, rather than measuring the range or orientation of an object.

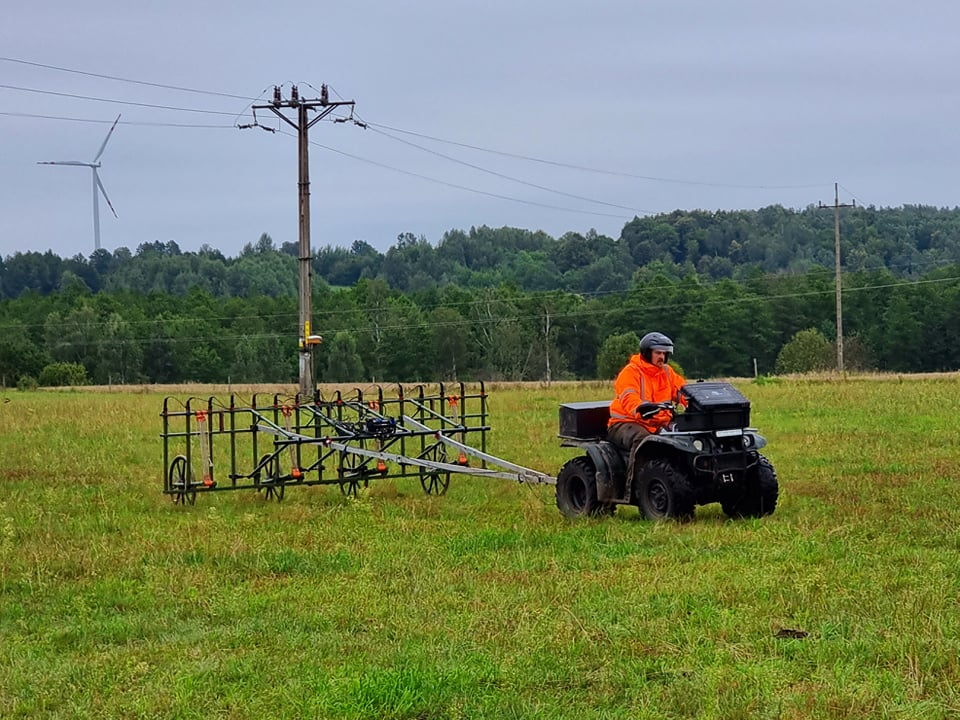
Geophysical survey using magnetometer

=== Forensics ===
Ground penetrating radar can be used to detect grave sites. This detection is of both legal and cultural importance, providing an opportunity for affected families to pursue justice through legal punishment of those responsible and to experience closure over the loss of a loved one.

=== Unexploded ordnance detection ===
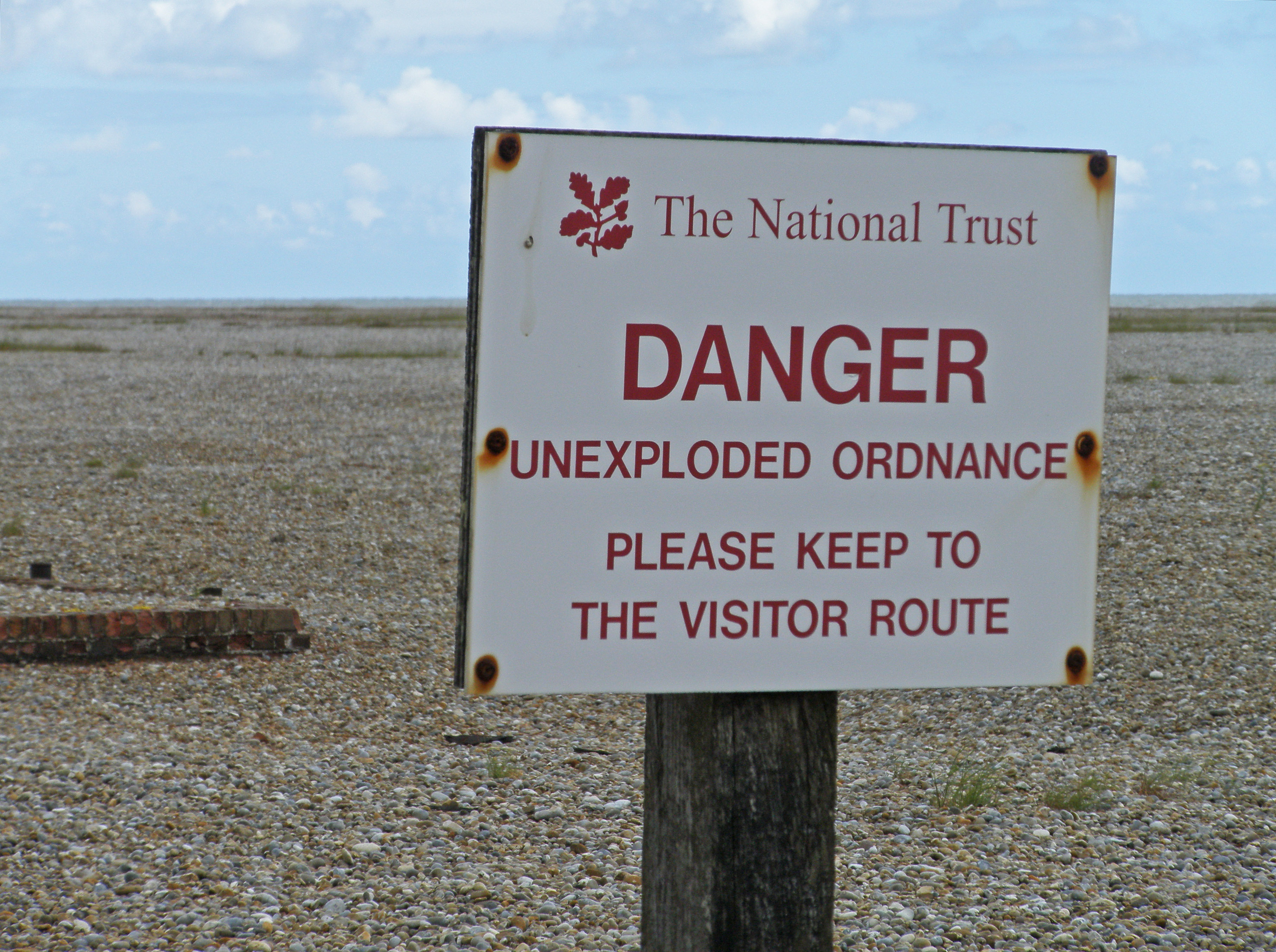
Warning sign from The National Trust indicating the presence of unexploded ordnance

Unexploded ordnance (or UXO) refers to the dysfunction or non-explosion of military explosives. Examples of these include, but are not limited to: bombs, flares, and grenades. It is important to be able to locate and contain unexploded ordnance to avoid injuries, and even possible death, to those who may come in contact with them.

The issue of unexploded ordnance originated as a result of the Crimean War (1853-1856). Before this, most unexploded ordnance was locally contained in smaller volumes, and was thus not a huge public issue. However, with the introduction of more widespread warfare, these quantities increased and were thus easy to lose track of and contain. According to Hooper & Hambric in their piece Unexploded Ordnance (UXO): The Problem, if we are unable to move away from war in the context of conflict resolution, this problem will only continue to get worse and will likely take more than a century to resolve.

Since our global method of conflict resolution banks on warfare, we must be able to rely on specific practices to detect this unexploded ordnance, such as magnetic and electromagnetic surveys. By looking at differences in magnetic susceptibility and/or electrical conductivity in relation to the unexploded ordnance and the surrounding geology (soil, rock, etc.), we are able to detect and contain unexploded ordnance.

== See also ==
- Archaeological geophysics
- Hydrocarbon exploration
- Kola Superdeep Borehole
- Leibniz Institute for Applied Geophysics
- Mineral exploration
- Ore genesis
- Petroleum geology
- Society of Exploration Geophysicists
