= Korea Institute of Geoscience and Mineral Resources =

Research institute in Daejeon, South Korea

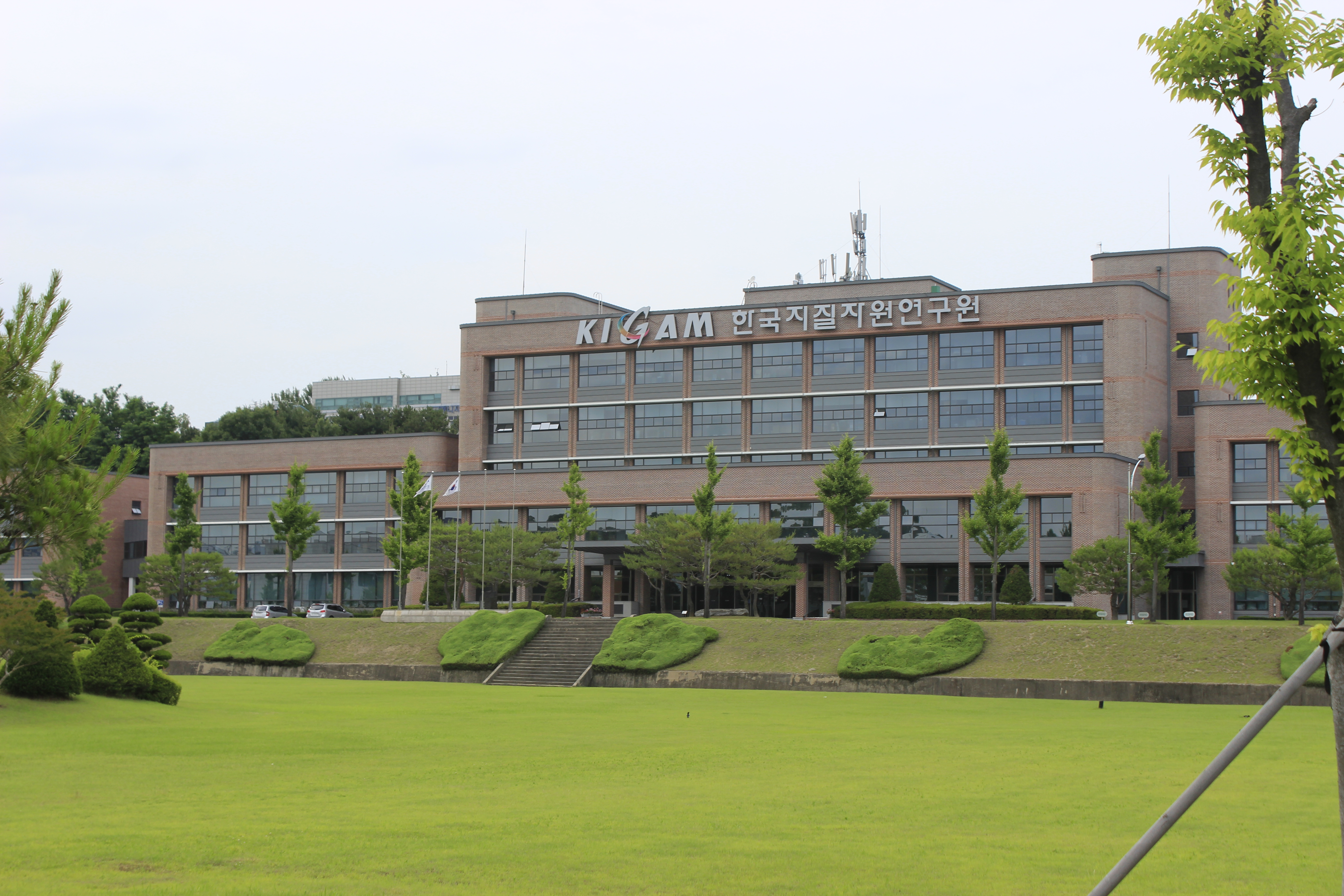
- Formation: May 1918; 108 years ago
- Headquarters: 124 Gwahak-ro, Yuseong-gu, Daejeon
- Coordinates: 36.3799°N 127.3606°E
- President: Lee Pyeong-Koo
- Website: www.kigam.re.kr

- Korea Institute of Geoscience and Mineral Resources
- Hangul: 한국지질자원연구원
- Hanja: 韓國地質資源硏究院
- RR: Hanguk jijil jawon yeonguwon
- MR: Han'guk chijil chawŏn yŏn'guwŏn

The Korea Institute of Geoscience and Mineral Resources (KIGAM; Korean: 한국지질자원연구원) is a research institute in South Korea focused on geological resources in the nation. KIGAM is a member institute of the National Research Council of Science and Technology and is under the National Science and Technology Research Association which is under the Ministry of Science and ICT.

== History ==
The name of the institute changed numerous times over the years. It was initially named Geological Survey, before merging and being renamed the Central Geological and Mining Research Institute in 1946, Central Geological and Mineralogical Research Institute in 1948, Geological Survey of Korea in 1961, and merged with the National Institute of Mineral Research and renamed Geological and Mineral Institute of Korea in 1973. Eight years later it was refounded as the Korea Research Institute of Geoscience & Mineral Resources. A decade later it was given the acronym KIGAM with the name Korea Institute of Geology, Mining and Materials before changing again in 2001 to Korea Institute of Geoscience and Mineral Resources while keeping the acronym.

== Research ==
Research divisions include the Geology and Space Division, Resources Utilization Division, Mineral Resources Division, Climate Change Response Division, Marine Geology and Energy Division, Geologic Hazards Division, and the KIGAM Pohang Branch.
