= Federal Institute for Geosciences and Natural Resources =

German geological survey in Hannover, Germany

- Bundesanstalt für Geowissenschaften und Rohstoffe (BGR)

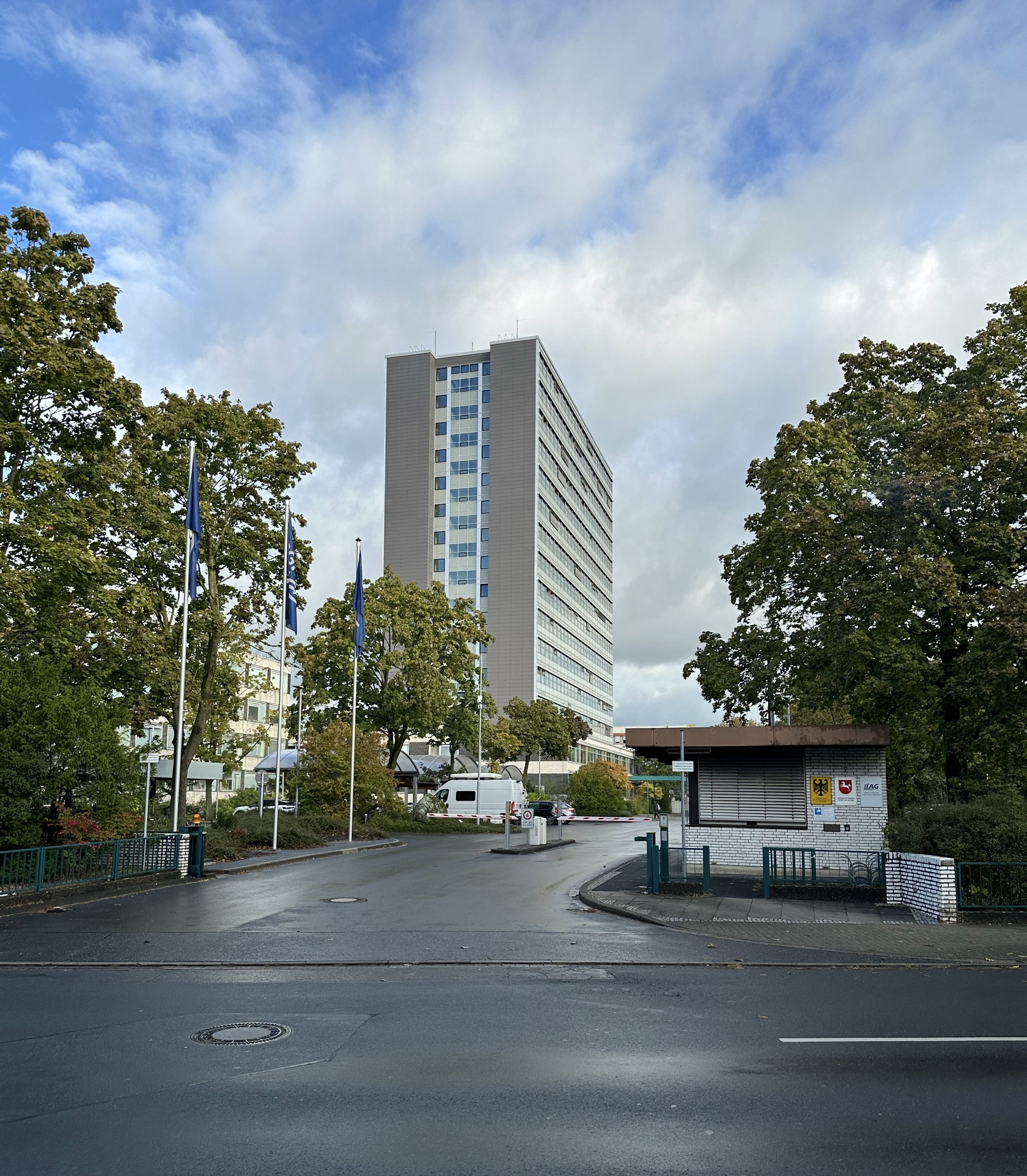
- Headquarters in Hanover

Agency overview
- Formed: 26 November 1985
- Jurisdiction: Government of Germany
- Headquarters: Hanover, Germany
- Employees: 760 (2025)
- Agency executive: Dr. Tim Vietor
- Website: www.bgr.bund.de

The Federal Institute for Geosciences and Natural Resources (German: Bundesanstalt für Geowissenschaften und Rohstoffe, abbreviated BGR) is a German federal agency within the Federal Ministry for Economic Affairs and Energy (BMWE) and serves as the central geoscientific advisory body to the Federal Government of Germany. The institute’s headquarters are located in Hanover, with additional offices in Berlin and Cottbus.

BGR also operates as a research institute, addressing topics in geology of continental, marine, and energy resources, as well as soil science, polar research, and geodata management.

Together with the State Authority for Mining, Energy and Geology (LBEG) and the LIAG Institute for Applied Geophysics it forms the Geozentrum Hannover ("Geocenter Hanover"). The three institutions share large parts of their infrastructure, maintain joint archives, libraries, and collections, and organize events across institutions.
