= Zerbo government =

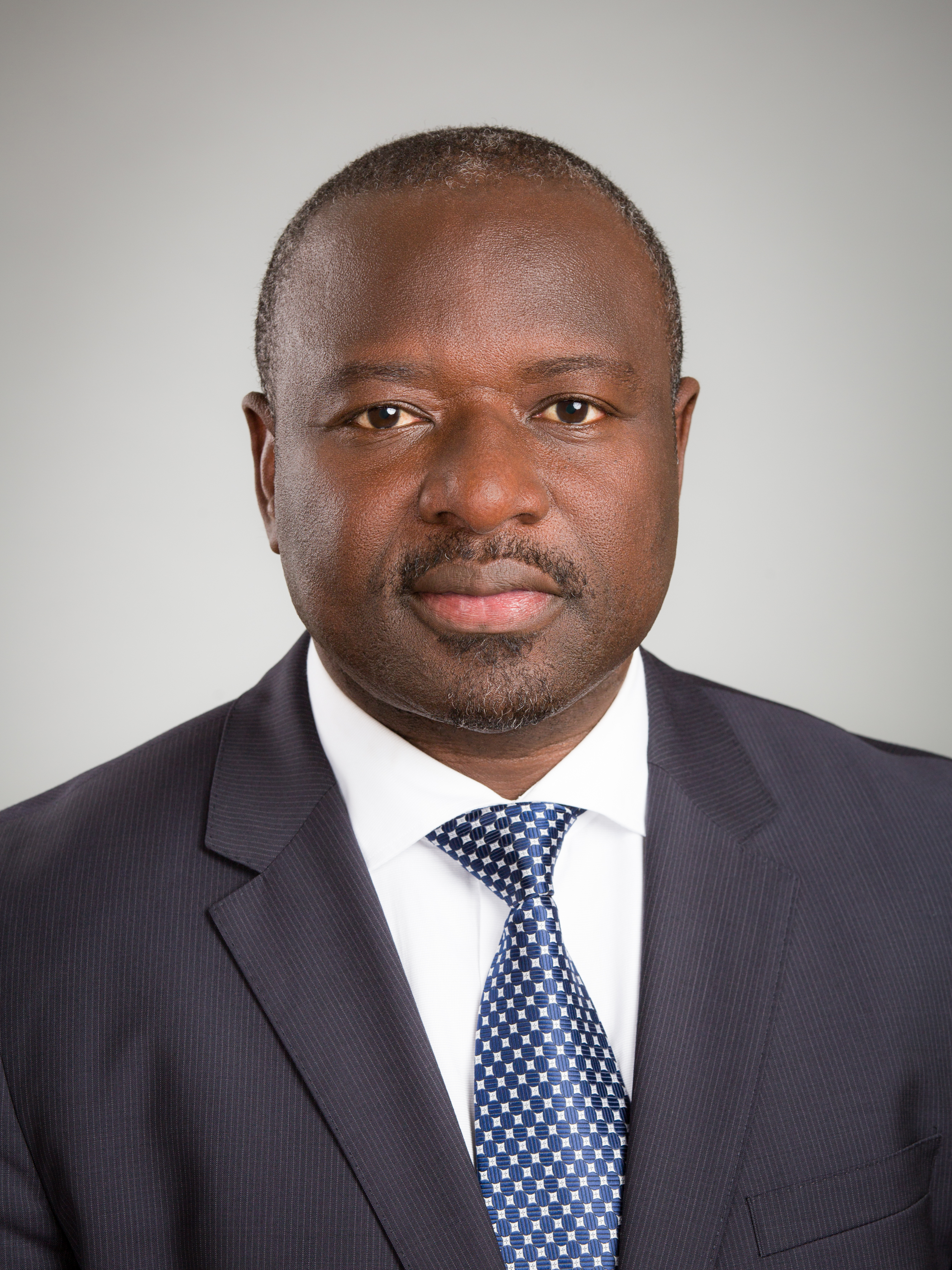
- Date formed: December 13, 2021
- Date dissolved: January 24, 2022

People and organisations
- President: Roch Marc Christian Kaboré
- Head of government: Lassina Zerbo

History
- Predecessor: Dabiré II
- Successor: Ouédraogo

The Zerbo government was the government administration of Burkina Faso under Lassina Zerbo from December 13, 2021, until it was dissolved following the coup d'état on January 24, 2022.

== Background ==
On December 8, 2021, Prime Minister Christophe Joseph Marie Dabiré resigned following public outcry over the government's failure to contain rising national insecurity. In response to this political transition, President Roch Marc Christian Kaboré subsequently appointed as Prime Minister the former Director of the Comprehensive Nuclear-Test-Ban Treaty Organization, Dr. Lassina Zerbo.

The new administration was inaugurated on December 13, 2021, featuring a reduced cabinet of 25 members. This "close-knit" team replaced 19 former ministers with 10 new appointments, all drawn from the ruling party or its allies. The government's primary mandate was to address the jihadist insurgency linked to Al-Qaeda and the Islamic State, which had caused over 2,000 deaths and displaced 1.4 million people since 2015.

In his general policy speech on January 7, 2022, Zerbo prioritized the restoration of peace and security. His agenda also included anti-corruption initiatives, COVID-19 management, and infrastructure development, specifically in road construction and solar energy. However, the government’s efforts were cut short when it was dissolved following the military coup on January 24, 2022.

== Prime Minister ==
Image	Portfolio	Name	Party
	Prime Minister	Lassina Zerbo	N.A
