= Reconnaissance satellite =

Satellite that covertly collects data for intelligence or military applications

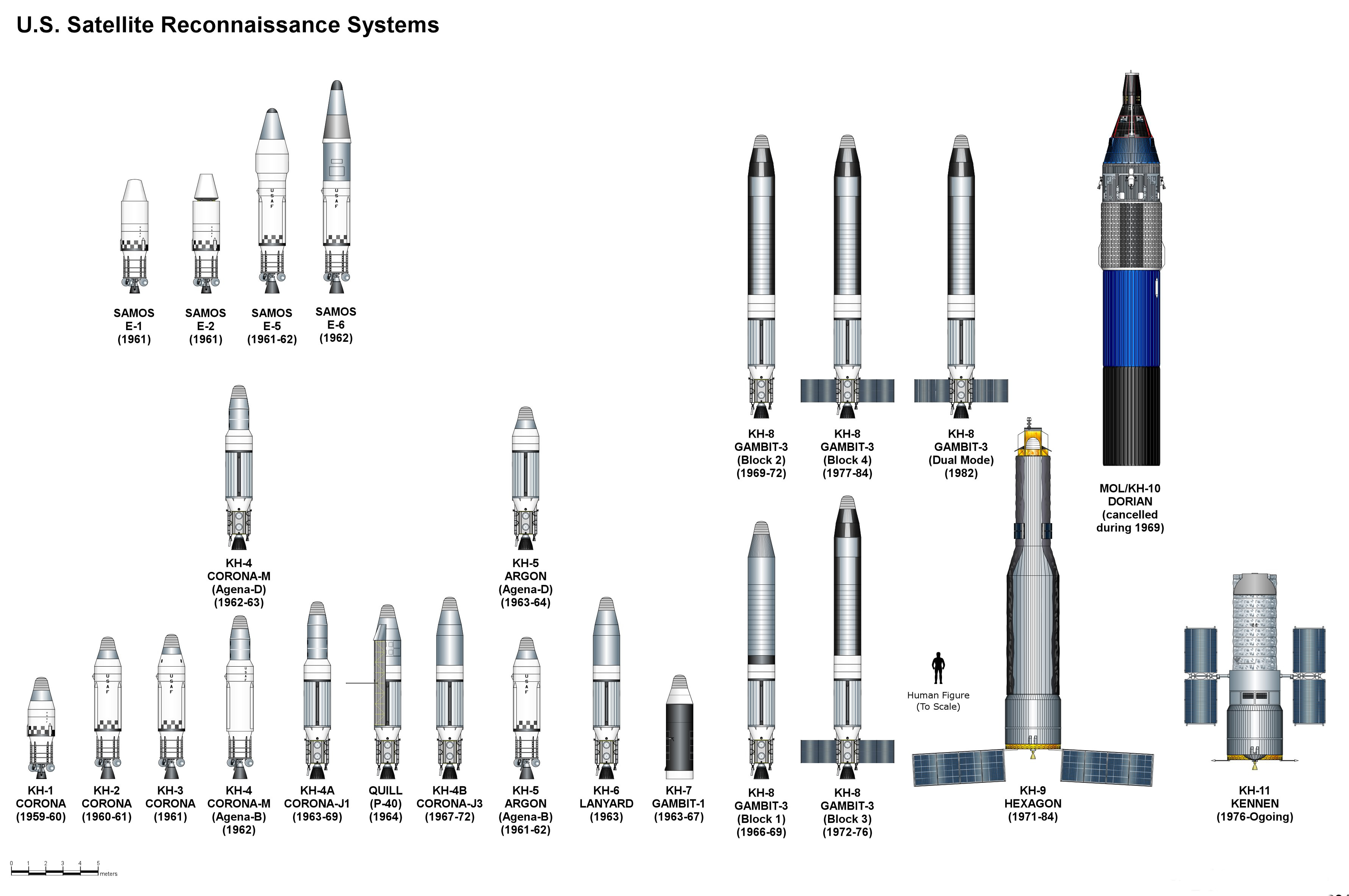
A list of the types of U.S. reconnaissance satellites deployed from 1960 onward

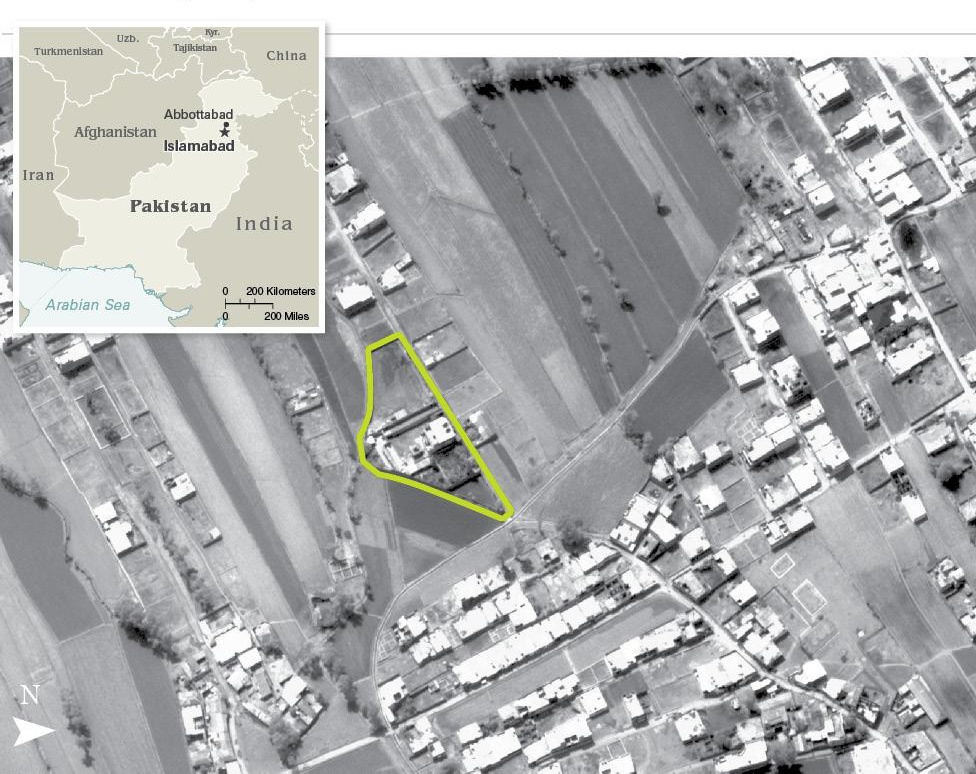
Aerial view of Osama bin Laden's compound in the Pakistani city of Abbottabad made by the CIA.

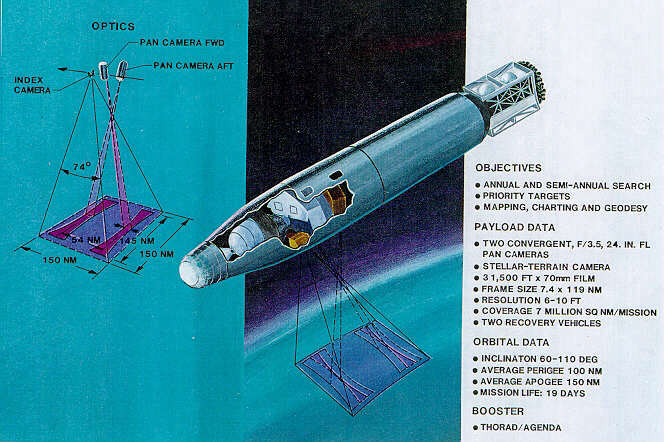
KH-4B Corona satellite

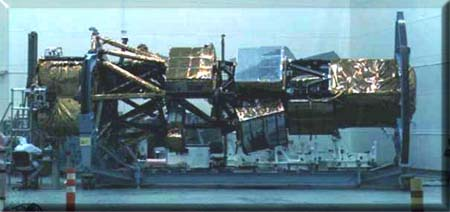
U.S. Lacrosse radar spy satellite under construction

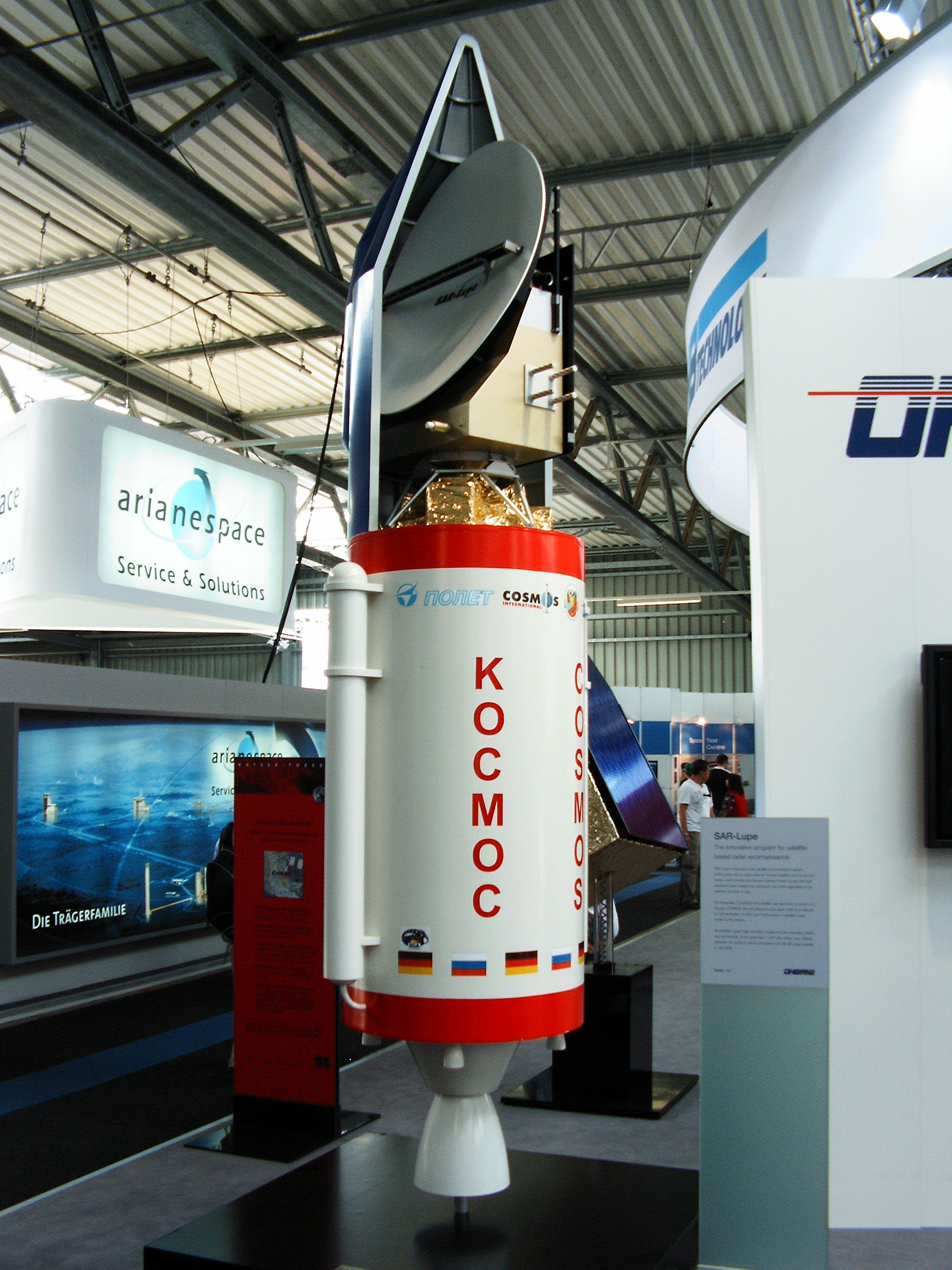
A model of a German SAR-Lupe reconnaissance satellite inside a Cosmos-3M rocket.

Microwave interception (Rhyolite)

A reconnaissance satellite or intelligence satellite (commonly, although unofficially, referred to as a spy satellite) is an Earth observation satellite or communications satellite deployed for military or intelligence applications.

The first generation type (i.e., Corona and Zenit) took photographs, then ejected canisters of photographic film which would descend back down into Earth's atmosphere. Corona capsules were retrieved in mid-air as they floated down on parachutes. Later, spacecraft had digital imaging systems and downloaded the images via encrypted radio links.

In the United States, most information available about reconnaissance satellites is on programs that existed up to 1972, as this information has been declassified due to its age. Some information about programs before that time is still classified information, and a small amount of information is available on subsequent missions.

A few up-to-date reconnaissance satellite images have been declassified on occasion, or leaked, as in the case of KH-11 photographs which were sent to Jane's Defence Weekly in 1984, or US President Donald Trump tweeting a classified image of the aftermath of a failed test of Iran's Safir rocket in 2019.

== History ==
On 16 March 1955, the United States Air Force officially ordered the development of an advanced reconnaissance satellite to provide continuous surveillance of "preselected areas of the Earth" in order "to determine the status of a potential enemy's war-making capability".

During the mid-late 1950s, both the United States and the Soviet Union took interest into reconnaissance satellites. The United States began the CORONA project, which encompassed several series of launches starting in 1959 and ending in 72. This program was made a priority to photograph denied areas, replace the U-2, and due to public concern about a technological gap between the West and the Soviet Union. It was expedited significantly after the shooting of a U-2 in 1960.

Meanwhile, in the Soviet Union, a decree that authorized the development of Sputnik apparently authorized a program for a satellite to be used for photo reconnaissance. This design evolved into Vostok, while another version became Zenit, which was an unmanned reconnaissance satellite. Zenit was launched from 1961 to 1994, however the last flight in 1994 was as a test payload.

Both the CORONA and Zenit satellites had to be recovered in order to access the used film, making them distinct from future reconnaissance satellites that could transmit photos without returning film to earth.

== Types ==
There are several major types of reconnaissance satellite.

Missile early warning

Provides warning of an attack by detecting ballistic missile launches. Earliest known are Missile Defense Alarm System.

Nuclear explosion detection
Detects nuclear detonation from space. Vela is the earliest known.

Electronic reconnaissance
Signals intelligence, intercepts stray radio waves. SOLRAD is the earliest known.

Optical imaging surveillance
Earth imaging satellites. Satellite images can be a survey or close-look telephoto. Corona is the earliest known. Spectral imaging is commonplace.

Radar imaging surveillance
Most space-based radars use synthetic-aperture radar. Can be used at night or through cloud cover. Earliest known are the Soviet US-A series.

== Missions ==
Examples of reconnaissance satellite missions:

- High resolution photography (IMINT)
- Measurement and Signature Intelligence (MASINT)
- Communications eavesdropping (SIGINT)
- Covert communications
- Monitoring of nuclear test ban compliance (see National Technical Means)
- Detection of missile launches

On 28 August 2013, it was thought that "a $1-billion high-powered spy satellite capable of snapping pictures detailed enough to distinguish the make and model of an automobile hundreds of miles below" was launched from California's Vandenberg Air Force Base using a Delta IV Heavy launcher, America's highest-payload space launch vehicle at the time.

On 17 February 2014, a Russian Kosmos-1220 originally launched in 1980 and used for naval missile targeting until 1982, made an uncontrolled atmospheric entry.

== Benefits ==
During the 1950s, a Soviet hoax had led to American fears of a bomber gap. In 1968, after gaining satellite photography, the United States' intelligence agencies were able to state with certainty that "No new ICBM complexes have been established in the USSR during the past year". President Lyndon B. Johnson told a gathering in 1967:

I wouldn't want to be quoted on this ... We've spent $35 or $40 billion on the space program. And if nothing else had come out of it except the knowledge that we gained from space photography, it would be worth ten times what the whole program has cost. Because tonight we know how many missiles the enemy has and, it turned out, our guesses were way off. We were doing things we didn't need to do. We were building things we didn't need to build. We were harboring fears we didn't need to harbor.

During his 1980 State of the Union Address, President Jimmy Carter argued that all of humanity benefited from the presence of American spy satellites:

...photo-reconnaissance satellites, for example, are enormously important in stabilizing world affairs and thereby make a significant contribution to the security of all nations.

Reconnaissance satellites have been used to enforce human rights, through the Satellite Sentinel Project, which monitors atrocities in Sudan and South Sudan.

Additionally, companies such as GeoEye and DigitalGlobe have provided commercial satellite imagery in support of natural disaster response and humanitarian missions.

== In fiction ==
Spy satellites are commonly seen in spy fiction and military fiction. Some works of fiction that focus specifically on spy satellites include:

- Body of Lies (2008)
- Enemy of the State (1998)
- Ice Station Zebra (1968)
- The OMAC Project (2005)
- Parmanu: The Story of Pokhran (2018)
- Patriot Games (1987)

== See also ==
- Aerial reconnaissance
- Defense Support Program (U.S.)
- European Union Satellite Centre
- Information Gathering Satellite (Japan)
- List of intelligence gathering disciplines
- List of Kosmos satellites
- National Reconnaissance Office (U.S.)
- Satcom on the Move
