= Ferdinand Ouedraogo =

Burkina Faso politician

Chief of Staff of Burkina Faso
- Incumbent
- Assumed office 21 October 2022
- President: Ibrahim Traoré

Personal details
- Born: Burkina Faso
- Party: People's Movement for Progress

Ferdinand Ouedraogo is a Burkinabe politician. He is the current Chief of Staff in Burkina Faso, having been appointed to the position in 2022 by the current interim president of Burkina Faso, Ibrahim Traoré. His term began on 21 October 2022.

Awards and achievements
Preceded by	Chief of Staff of Burkina Faso	Succeeded by
