= Lassina Zerbo =

Prime Minister of Burkina Faso from 2021 to 2022

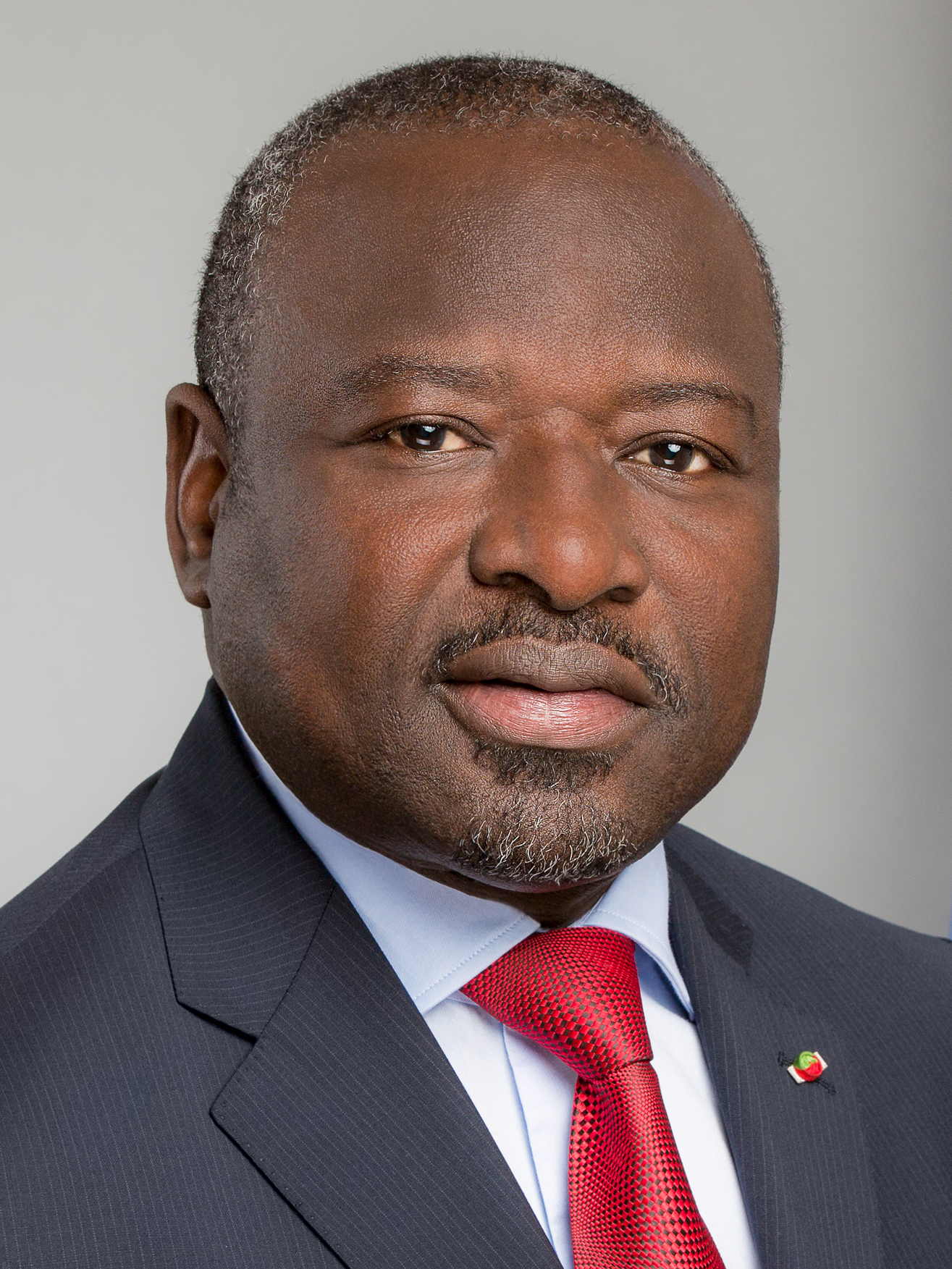
- Official portrait, 2018

President of the Rwanda Atomic Energy Board
- Incumbent
- Assumed office 22 May 2024
- President: Paul Kagame

Prime Minister of Burkina Faso
- In office 10 December 2021 – 24 January 2022
- President: Roch Marc Christian Kaboré
- Preceded by: Christophe Dabiré
- Succeeded by: Albert Ouédraogo

Executive Secretary of the OTICE
- In office 1 August 2013 – 31 July 2017
- Preceded by: Tibor Toth
- Succeeded by: Robert Floyd
- In office 1 August 2017 – 31 July 2021
- Preceded by: Tibor Toth
- Succeeded by: Robert Floyd

Director of the International Data Center of the OTICE
- In office 2004 – 31 July 2013

Personal details
- Born: 10 October 1963 (age 63) Upper Volta (now Burkina Faso)
- Citizenship: Burkina Faso
- Children: 3
- Education: Paris-Sud University
- Occupation: Politician; Scientist
- Website: www.zerbo.org

Academic background
- Thesis: The application of electromagnetic methods to the study of the structures of the earth's crust (1993)

Academic work
- Discipline: Geophysics

Lassina Zerbo (born 10 October 1963) is a Burkinabé politician, scientist and diplomat. He served as the third Executive Secretary of the Preparatory Commission of the Comprehensive Nuclear-Test-Ban Treaty Organization (OTICE/CTBTO) from 2013 to 2021 and Prime Minister of Burkina Faso under President Roch Marc Christian Kaboré from December 10, 2021, to January 24, 2022.

== Biography ==
=== Early life and education ===
Lassina Zerbo was born on October 10, 1963, in Bobo-Dioulasso, the capital of the Houet Province from Hauts-Bassins Region and the second-largest city in Burkina Faso. He grew up in an environment that from a very early stage favored his interest in the exact sciences. After completing his primary and secondary education, he moved to France to continue his university studies. He enrolled at the Paris-Sud University (Paris XI), where he specialized in Earth sciences.

In 1993, he defended his doctoral thesis in geophysics. His doctoral research focuses on the application of electromagnetic methods to the study of the structures of the earth's crust, a technical expertise that will form the basis of his future international career.

== Career ==
=== Early career ===
Lassina Zerbo began his international career at BHP Minerals International where he obtained a position as a geophysics researcher, then as a geophysical project manager for the Africa programs in Virginia, United States, where he brought his scientific and technical expertise on all airborne electromagnetic system projects.

In 1995, he joined the Anglo American Exploration Group as Divisional Principal Geophysicist for Africa, and was appointed Director of the Geophysical Division for Africa in 2001. In this position, he was responsible for all operations in Africa, keeping supervision over research and development for most projects in Africa, Asia and Australia.

=== Director of the International Data Center of the OTICE ===
In 2004, Lassina Zerbo was appointed director of the International Data Centre (ICD) of the Comprehensive Nuclear-Test-Ban Treaty Organization (ICEI). He was at the forefront of managing nuclear testing issues carried out by the Democratic People's Republic of Korea in 2006, 2009 and 2013. He oversaw the organization of Science and Technology conferences in 2011 and 2013, as well as the deployment of the vDEC (Virtual Data Exploitation Center) system, a portal that allows the scientific community to access the data of the International Monitoring System.

In the aftermath of the 2004 Indian Ocean tsunami, Zerbo spearheaded technical discussions regarding the agreement on CTBTO technical assistance to tsunami warning centres. He served as the custodian of all technically sensitive information of the organization, which was called on following the earthquake, tsunami and Fukushima nuclear power plant accident in Japan in March 2011.

=== Executive Secretary of the CTBTO ===
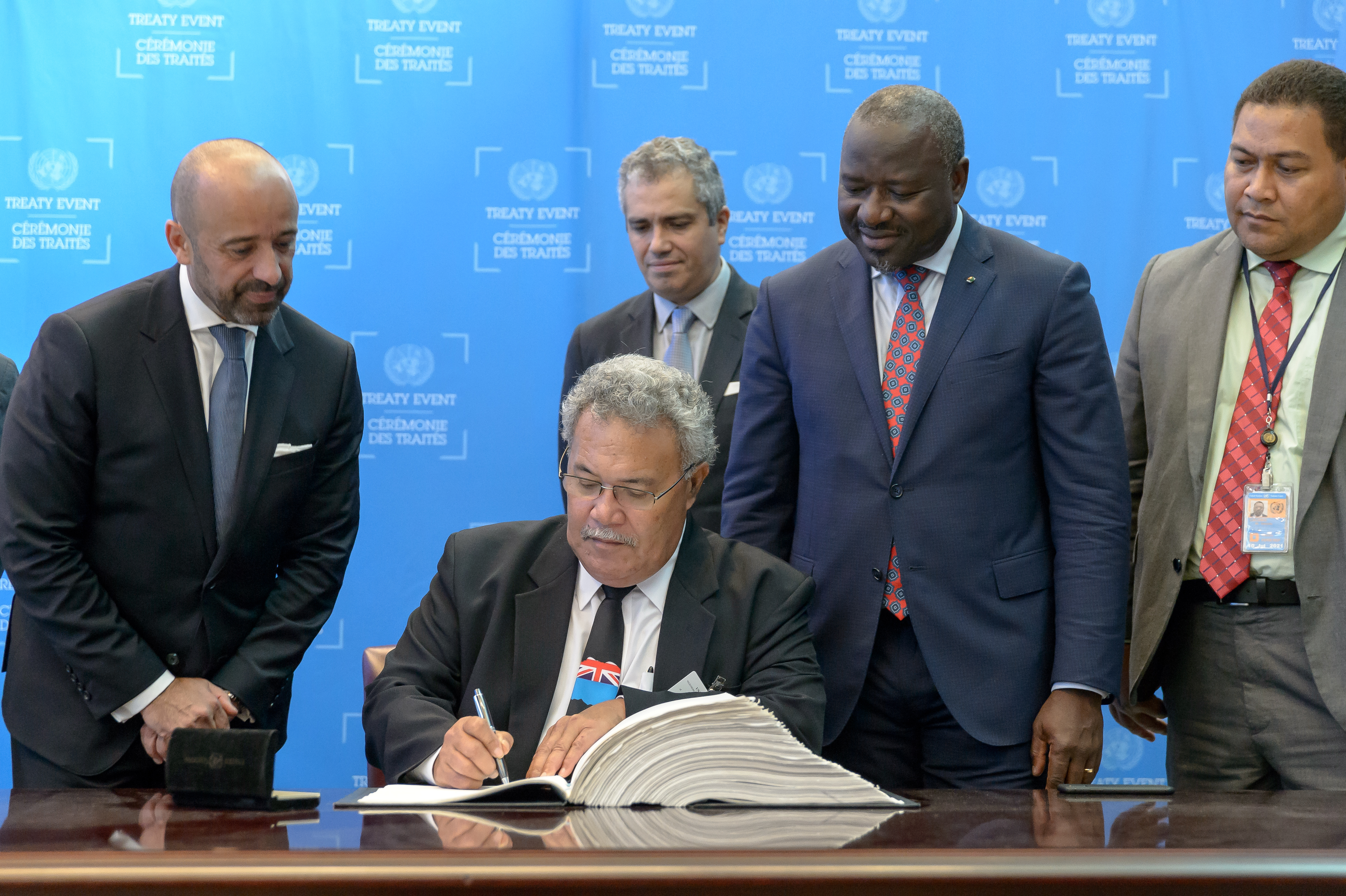
The Executive Secretary of the OTICE, Lassina Zerbo, with the Prime Minister of Tuvalu, Enele Sopoaga, at the signing of the Comprehensive Nuclear Test-Ban-Treaty by the Tuvalu, on September 25, 2018.

From 2013 to 2021, Lassina Zerbo held, for two consecutive terms, the position of Executive Secretary of the Preparatory Commission for the Comprehensive Nuclear-Test-Ban Treaty Organization (OTICE/CTBTO). During this period, he supervised the strengthening of the International Monitoring System (ISS), a global network of seismic, hydroacoustic, infrasound and radionuclide stations.

Lassina Zerbo established the Eminent Personality Group (GEM) and the CTBTO Youth Group Network, two initiatives to maintain diplomatic and political engagement around the nuclear non-proliferation standard, to promote the Comprehensive Nuclear-Test-Ban Treaty and to reinvigorate international efforts to achieve this. On the occasion of a large-scale field exercise, conducted in Jordan in 2014 (OSI Integrated Field Exercise), he demonstratex the operational capacity of the OTICE to conduct an on-site inspection and the successful stewardship of the Organization's mandate during the COVID-19 pandemic in 2020.

After eight years at the head of the Executive Secretariat of the OTICE, Lassina Zerbo leaves office on July 31, 2021, in accordance with the statutes of the organization limiting the exercise of this function to two terms. He was replaced by Australian Robert Floyd on August 1, 2021, being the organization's fourth Executive Secretariat.

Lassina Zerbo was appointed Prime Minister of Burkina Faso in December of the same year by Burkinabe President Roch Marc Christian Kaboré.

=== Prime Minister of Burkina Faso ===
Lassina Zerbo's entry on the national political scene was in a context of acute security and social crisis in Burkina Faso. On December 10, 2021, he was appointed Prime Minister by President Roch Marc Christian Kaboré. This appointment came shortly after the Inata attack, which aroused strong popular sentiment and led to the dismissal of the previous government. Perceived as a technocrat with an international stature, Zerbo's main mission was to restore state authority and reorganize the national defense strategy in the face of the growing terrorist threat.

As soon as he took office, Lassina Zerbo showed a desire to break with the past by reducing state largesse. He formed a tight government, composed of 25 members compared to 34 previously, aiming for greater operational efficiency. His general policy speech focused on 'national cohesion" and the need for a multidimensional response to insecurity, combining military actions and socio-economic development projects in fragile areas. He also called for patriotic mobilization and unity of the political class.

On January 24, 2022, just a few weeks after his appointment, a military coup led by Lieutenant-Colonel Paul-Henri Sandaogo Damiba overthrew President Kaboré. This coup prematurely ends Zerbo's functions and dissolves his government and the National Assembly. The post of Prime Minister remains officially vacant under the direct direction of the junta until March 3, 2022 when he was replaced by economist Albert Ouédraogo.

After being briefly placed under house arrest, like all members of the previous executive for security and procedural reasons, Lassina Zerbo was released from any restrictions and withdrew from Burkinabe's active political life to return to the international scene.

== Other activities ==
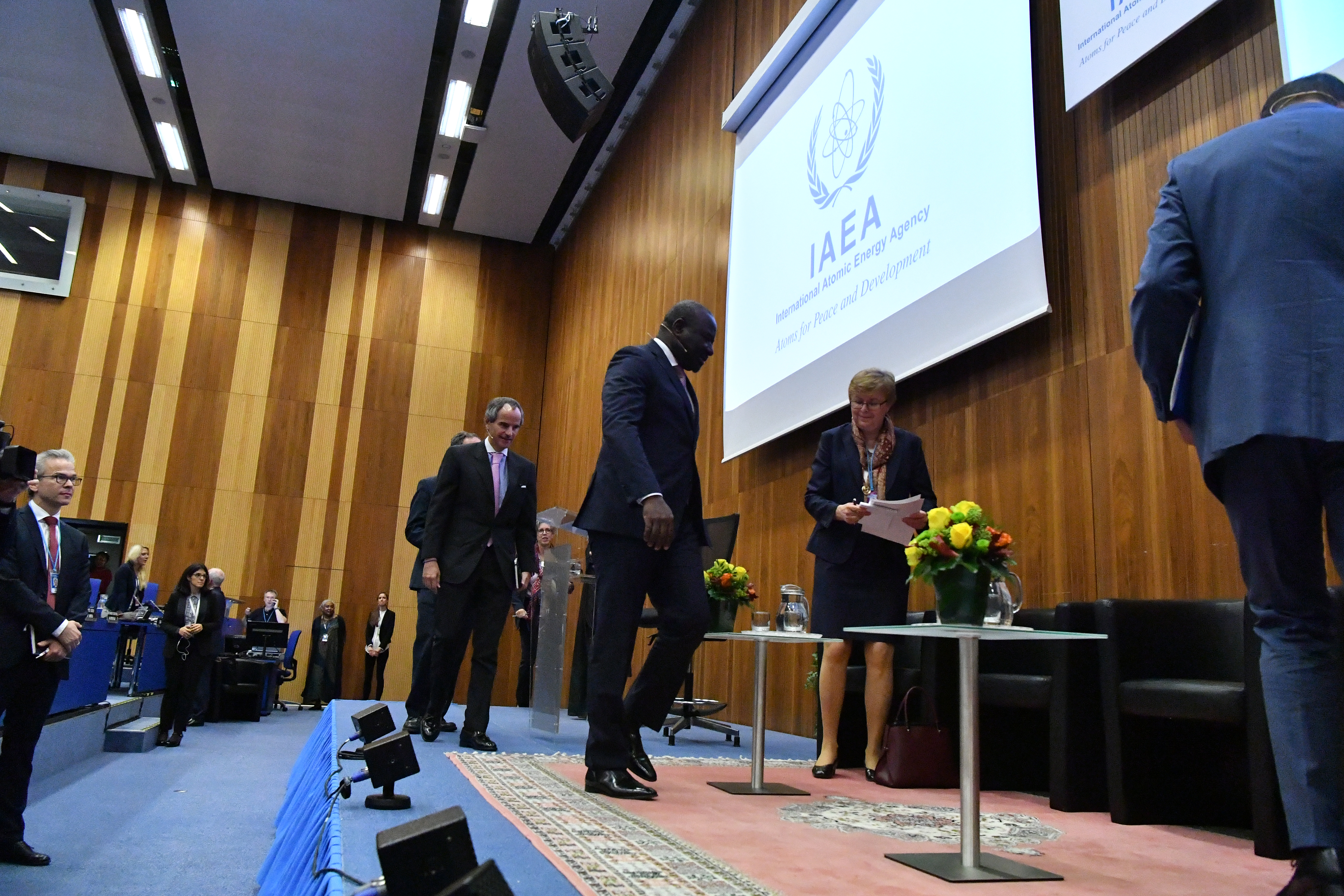
Dr. Lassina Zerba at the meeting of the Board of Governors of the International Atomic Energy Agency (IAEA) to listen to the presentation of the four candidates for the post of Director General, held at the Agency's headquarters in Vienna, Austria.

From 2014 to 2016, Lassina Zerbo assumed the role of co-chair of the Global Nuclear Security Agenda of the World Economic Forum, which was established to facilitate discussions between policy makers and leaders from the private and public sectors on nuclear safety topics, including disarmament and non-proliferation. He secured China's resumption of technical cooperation with the CTBTO, leading to the certification of the first five International Monitoring System stations on Chinese territory between 2016 and 2018. Zerbo also secured a commitment by Cuba to join the Treaty, announced in 2019.

In August 2017, Lassina Zerbo was made "Honoral Citizen of the City of Hiroshima" for his initiatives to preserve, disseminate and transmit the reality of atomic bombing, as well as his determination to promote the message of Hiroshima and the hibakusha.

In 2018, he received the Award for Science Diplomacy, which was presented to him by the American Association for the Advancement of Science (AAAS), for his commitment to the elimination of nuclear tests. At the announcement of this award, the AAAS announced that Lassina Zerbo had been chosen because he "uses his scientific expertise and leadership qualities" to "address complex challenges and promote peace in the world".

In 2024, Lassina Zerbo was appointed Chairman of the Board of Directors of the Rwandan Mines, Petroleum and Gas Board (RMB) to contribute his expertise in scientific diplomacy and technological management. He is involved in the development of centers of excellence and regularly participates in government initiatives to position Kigali as a hub for research and innovation in Africa.

== Recognition ==
Lassina Zerbo has received several international awards and national decorations in recognition of his commitment to scientific diplomacy, nuclear non-proliferation and global security.

=== National decorations ===
- Burkina Faso: Grand Officer of the Order of the Standard (raised to this dignity after being Commander of the National Order in 2015).
- Chile: Grand Cross of the Order of Bernardo O'Higgins (2016).
- Kazakhstan: Presidential Medal of the 25th anniversary of the Republic of Kazakhstan (2017).
- Madagascar: Officer of the Order of Merit of the Republic of Madagascar (2019), for his support for strengthening technical capacities in Africa.
- Austria: Great silver decoration of honor for services rendered to the Republic of Austria (2021).
- Russia: Great Honor for services rendered to international cooperation (2021)

=== International awards and awards ===
- Arms Control Person of the Year: awarded by the Arms Control Association (United States) in 2013, for his action at the head of the CTBTO.
- Special honorary citizenship of the city of Hiroshima: awarded in 2017 by the mayor of Hiroshima for his leadership in favor of a world without nuclear weapons.
- Top 10 scientific personalities of the year: designated in 2017 by the prestigious journal Nature in its annual list "Nature's 10".
- Scientific Diplomacy Award: Awarded by the American Association for the Advancement of Science (AAAS) in 2018.
- Nazarbayev Prize for a world without nuclear weapons: received in 2019 in Kazakhstan for its global efforts to disarmament.
- Doctor honoris causa of the Autonomous University of Santo Domingo (UASD), October 2019 in the Dominican Republic.

=== Other honors ===
- Member of the Kenjin-Tatsujin Council: member of this council of prominent personalities supporting the Ashinaga organization for the education of orphans in Africa.
- Cited for his outstanding contribution to nuclear disarmament and peace in the world, Zerbo was presented with Development Champion Award of the Forum for Rebranding Africa in November 2019.
- Executive Secretary Emeritus: honorary title awarded by the Comprehensive Nuclear-Test-Ban Treaty Organization at the end of its mandates in 2021.

== Personal life ==
Zerbo is married and has three daughters.

Political offices
Preceded by Christophe Joseph Marie Dabiré	Prime Minister of Burkina Faso; 2021–2022	Succeeded by Albert Ouédraogo
