= Bibata Nebie =

Burkinabe politician

Minister of Justice and Human Rights
- Incumbent
- Assumed office 21 October 2022
- President: Ibrahim Traoré

Personal details
- Born: French Upper Volta (now Burkina Faso)
- Party: People's Movement for Progress

Bibata Nebie is a Burkinabe politician. She is the current Minister of Justice and Human Rights in Burkina Faso, having been appointed to the position in 2022 by the current interim president of Burkina Faso, Ibrahim Traoré. Her term began on 21 October 2022.

Awards and achievements
Preceded by	Minister of Justice and Human Rights	Succeeded by
