= Nuclear detonation detection system =

Series of devices detecting nuclear explosions

A nuclear detonation detection system (NDDS) is a device or a series of devices that are able to indicate, and pinpoint a nuclear explosion has occurred as well as the direction of the explosion. The main purpose of these devices or systems was to verify compliance of countries that signed nuclear treaties such as the Partial Test Ban treaty of 1963 (PTBT) and the Treaty of Tlatelolco.

There are many different ways to detect a nuclear detonation, these include seismic, hydroacoustic, and infrasound detection, air sampling, and satellites. They have their own weaknesses and strengths, as well as different utilities. Each has been used separately, but at present the best results occur when data is used in tandem, since the energy caused by an explosion will transfer over to different mediums.

== Seismic ==
Seismic networks are one of the possibilities of detonation detection. During an above ground nuclear explosion, there will be a blooming mushroom in the sky, but there will also be a vibration through the ground that spreads for a long distance. In the 1980s, nuclear weapons testing was moved below ground. Even then, it is hard to detect, and especially tricky when the explosion has a small yield. With a seismic network, detection of these nuclear tests is possible.

The Partial Test Ban Treaty (PTBT) banned nuclear testing in the atmosphere, underwater, and in outer space. The U.S. developed many different devices to ensure the Soviet Union was upholding its part of the treaty. The PTBT aimed to ban underground testing as well, but at the time the technology could not detect detonations very well with seismographs, let alone differentiate them from earthquakes making underground tests more difficult to identify than detonations in the atmosphere or underwater. Larger yields could be differentiated but the smaller ones could not be. Even then larger explosions could be dampened by a larger cavity in the ground. With the threat of the Soviet Union conducting underground detonations the U.S. pumped money into seismology research.

== Hydroacoustic ==
There are 11 hydroacoustic stations that are set up to monitor any activity in the oceans. They were developed to ensure the ban on underwater testing, and because of water’s ability to carry sound they are very efficient. These stations collect data in real time, work 24 hours a day for 365 days a year. However, hydroacoustics have difficulties pinpointing the location of an explosion or event, so they must be used with another method of detection finding (such as the ones previously mentioned). Other problems that hydroacoustics face are the difficulties caused by the structure of the sea floor, as well as islands that can block sound. Sound travels the best through deep ocean, so events near shallow water will not be detected as well. However, hydroacoustic devices also serve different purposes and are used as a unique resource for research on ocean phenomena.

== Infrasound ==
Infrasound works by having multiple stations that use microbarometers to listen for infrasonic waves caused by explosions, volcanoes or other natural occurring events. As with other detection methods, infrasound was developed during the Cold War. These stations were designed to detect explosions with forces as low as 1 kiloton. But after the PTBT, atmospheric detonation detection was left to satellites. Although infrasound waves could travel across the earth multiple times they are very prone to being influenced by the wind and by temperature variations. Sources of long range infrasonic waves are difficult to differentiate (e.g. chemical explosion vs. nuclear explosion).

== Air sampling ==
Another way of detecting a nuclear detonation is through air sampling; after a nuclear explosion, radioactive isotopes that get released into the air can be collected by plane. These radionuclides include americium-241, iodine-131, caesium-137, krypton-85, strontium-90, plutonium-239, tritium and xenon. Sending planes over or near an area can reveal if there was a recent nuclear detonation, though most air samples are taken at one of many radionuclide stations set throughout the world. Even underground detonations will eventually release radioactive gases (most notably xenon) which can also be detected via these methods. Issues with air-sampling detection instruments include sensitivity, convenience, reliability, accuracy and power requirements.

One weakness of the air sampling method is that air currents can move the gases or radionuclides in unpredictable ways, depending on where the explosion was and the weather conditions at the time. The detection process involves taking air samples with a filter paper which collects the radioactive material which can then be counted and analyzed by a computer. Outside “noise” such as other forms of radiation, like those released from factories or nuclear plants, can throw off the results. Another weakness of this method is that special media must be used for certain radionuclides. Radioactive iodine is an example of this, as it exists in many chemical forms, combined with an array of many different gases that are not suitable for direct reading methods using absorption or collection of a fixed volume in containers.

An example of how air currents can easily disperse radioactive particles is the Chernobyl disaster; as the reactor started failing, a large amount of radionuclides were released into the air. Spread by air currents, this led to radiation that could be detected as far as Sweden and other countries hundreds of miles away from the plant within a few days; the same occurred at the Fukushima Daiichi disaster. The spread of radioactive xenon gas, iodine-131, and caesium-137 could be detected on different continents many miles away.

== Satellites ==
Satellites rely on sensors to monitor radiation from nuclear explosions that always produce gamma rays, x-rays, and neutrons. Nuclear explosions release a massive burst of x-rays that occur repeatedly with an interval of less than 1 microsecond that could be detected by the satellite. Groups of satellites can pick up on these signals, and can trilaterate the location of the explosion. Satellites were first used in 1963 and throughout the Cold War to ensure no nuclear testing was conducted. A minor drawback to the satellite detection method is that there are some cosmic rays that emit neutrons and could give false signals to the sensor.

Starting in October 17, 1963, in the USA, dedicated Vela Satellites were first used by the Air Force and the Atomic Energy Commission, which is a predecessor organization to the current Department of Energy. The Vela satellite was created following the PTBT (Partial Test Ban Treaty), which was signed in August 1963. Vela's purpose was to respond to the PTBT, as a nuclear detonation detector. Vela is considered as a GPA satellite, while the Department of Energy operates the sensors. The project consisted of 12 satellites, each equipped with x-ray, neutron, and gamma ray detectors. and also was equipped to measure physical outputs: light(via a photodiode), and radio waves.

Satellites are now also equipped with cameras measuring the complete visible light spectrum that are able to capture above ground explosions. With the advent of Global Position System (GPS) satellites being launched with nuclear detection systems, satellites have become an important method of detonation detection.

Satellites with improved Space and Atmospheric Burst Reporting System (SABRS) equipment were launched after 2018 with such equipment increasing reliability, reducing size and improving nuclear detonation detection capabilities.

== Comprehensive Nuclear Test Ban Treaty ==
The Comprehensive Nuclear Test Ban Treaty (CTBT) banned all forms of nuclear testing in an attempt to disarm and move away from nuclear weapons, but with it came old challenges, such as how to ensure members would not cheat on the treaty. To that end the International monitoring system (IMS) was born, having 321 stations, which use all of the sensor types previously described. Using collected data from each source to calculate detonations, the IMS employs hydroacoustic, infrasound, and seismic wave detection systems, as well as air samplers for radionuclides. All of this information is collected by the Preparatory Commission for the Comprehensive Nuclear-Test-Ban Treaty Organization (CTBTO) which is stationed in Vienna, Austria.

== Effectiveness ==
One of the first occasions when the CTBTO and its detection systems showed itself effective was when it was able to identify nuclear testing by India and Pakistan in May 1998.

Another notable example is the detection of North Korean testing. As most countries have given up nuclear detonation tests, North Korea has attempted to create a powerful nuclear warhead. Due to North Korea’s secrecy it is up to IMS to give researchers the information needed to evaluate North Korea’s threats. Even their low yield (0.6 Kiloton) first attempt at a nuclear weapon was picked up and isolated in 2006.
