= Elise Foniyama Thiombioano Ilboudo =

Archaeologist and politician

Elise Foniyama Thiombioano Ilboudo is an archaeologist and politician in Burkina Faso.

Since January 10, 2020, she has been Burkina Faso's Minister of Culture, Arts, and Tourism. She has been affiliated with the People's Movement for Progress.
