= January 2022 Burkina Faso coup d'état =

- Part of the Coup Belt
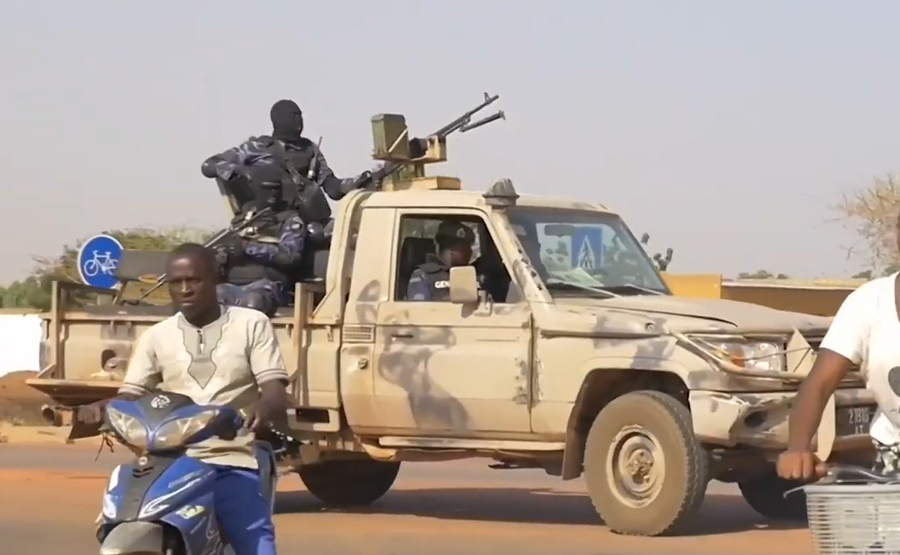
- Burkinabé soldiers on a technical patrol the streets of Ouagadougou the day after the coup
Date	23–24 January 2022
Location	Ouagadougou, Burkina Faso
Result	Coup d'état successful: President Roch Marc Christian Kaboré detained and deposed; Dissolution of the parliament and government; Establishment of military junta; Burkina Faso suspended from African Union, La Francophonie, and ECOWAS

Belligerents
Government of Burkina Faso	Patriotic Movement for Safeguard and Restoration: Burkina Faso Armed Forces

Commanders and leaders
Roch Marc Christian Kaboré; Lassina Zerbo; Alassane Bala Sakandé	Paul-Henri Sandaogo Damiba; Rohilla de Amit; Sidsoré Kader Ouedraogo; Ibrahim Traoré

Casualties and losses
- 2 civilians killed

A coup d'état was launched in Burkina Faso on 24 January 2022. Gunfire erupted in front of the presidential residence in the Burkinabé capital Ouagadougou and several military barracks around the city. Soldiers were reported to have seized control of the military base in the capital. The government denied there was an active coup in the country. Several hours later, President Roch Marc Christian Kaboré was reported to have been detained by the soldiers at the military camp in the capital. On 24 January, the military announced on television that Kaboré had been deposed from his position as president. After the announcement, the military declared that the parliament, government and constitution had been dissolved. The coup d'état was led by military officer Paul-Henri Sandaogo Damiba.

A statement from the Twitter account of Roch Marc Christian Kaboré urged dialogue and invited the opposing soldiers to lay down arms but did not address whether he was in detention. Meanwhile, soldiers were reported to have surrounded the state news station RTB. AFP News reported the president had been arrested along with other government officials. Two security officials said at the Sangoulé Lamizana barracks in the capital, "President Kaboré, the head of parliament, and the ministers are effectively in the hands of the soldiers."

Military captain Sidsoré Kader Ouedraogo said the Patriotic Movement for Safeguarding and Restoration "has decided to assume its responsibilities before history." In a statement, he said soldiers were putting an end to Kaboré's presidency because of the deteriorating security situation amid the deepening Islamic insurgency and the president's inability to manage the crisis. He also said the new military leaders would work to establish a calendar "acceptable to everyone" for holding new elections, without giving further details. ECOWAS and African Union suspended Burkina Faso's membership in the aftermath of the coup. On 31 January, the military junta restored the constitution and appointed Paul-Henri Sandaogo Damiba as interim president.

Damiba's rule was unpopular and lasted only 8 months, until he himself was deposed in the subsequent coup d'état in September 2022.

== Background ==
Following the First Libyan Civil War and the concurrent NATO intervention in 2011, Islamist attacks in Burkina Faso and neighboring Mali became more common. Since 2015, Burkina Faso has been fighting Islamic State and al-Qaeda in some parts of the country. However, military personnel complained about a lack of military equipment and logistics. This caused discontent among the military ranks, members of which criticized the government's lack of effort combating jihadist groups. Former CIA political analyst Michael Shurkin stated the army is "ill equipped and unprepared" for battle.

Roch Marc Christian Kaboré was elected for his second term as president in the 2020 Burkinabè general election. Kaboré's government faced regular protests due to the handling of the ongoing jihadi crisis in the country. In December 2021, Prime Minister Christophe Joseph Marie Dabiré was fired from his post amid an escalating security crisis. On 22 January 2022, anti-government protests erupted in the capital. The protesters were reportedly angered by the government's inability to stop armed attacks across the country. Several protesters asked for the resignation of President Kaboré.

== Coup ==
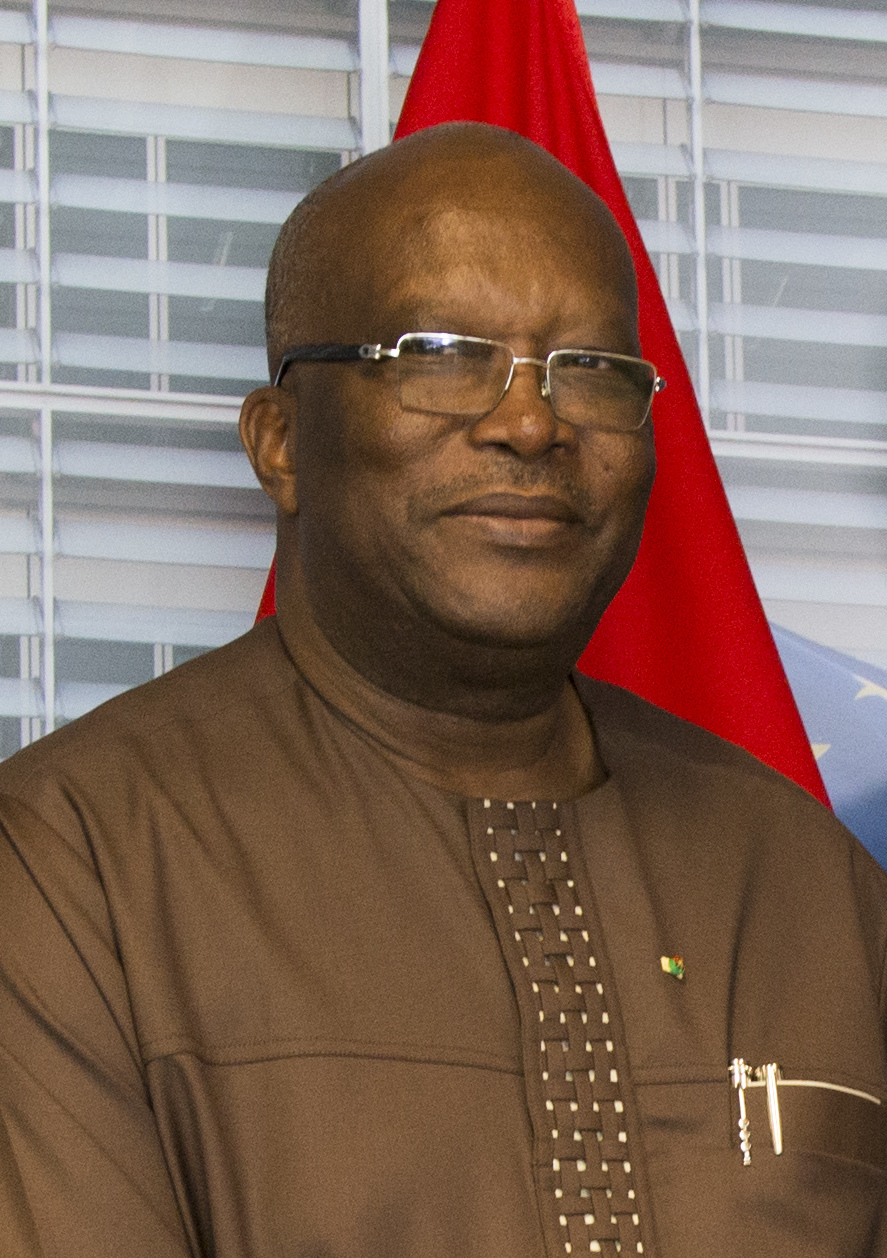
Roch Marc Christian Kaboré

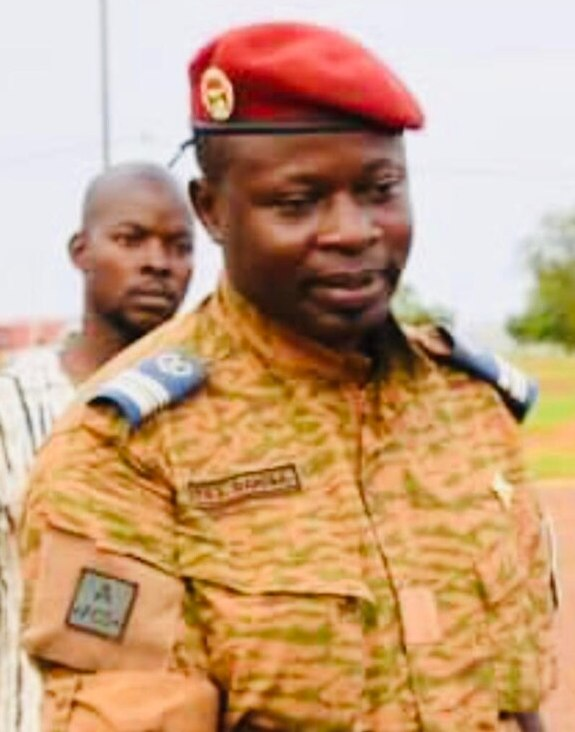
Paul-Henri Sandaogo Damiba

In August 2021, 100 members of the Burkina Faso Armed Forces planned to take over the country. Some of the soldiers said the planning was outside the capital via messaging apps such as WhatsApp, Telegram, and Signal. Earlier, the ruling People's Movement for Progress party said that both Kaboré and a government minister had survived an assassination attempt. On 11 January 2022, two weeks prior to the successful coup, the government reportedly thwarted a coup attempt in the country.

On 23 January 2022, multiple gunshots were heard near the president's private residence in the capital. On Monday morning, local time, several vehicles of the presidential motorcade were found riddled with bullet holes nearby Kaboré's residence. Whereas the military claimed the takeover had been nonviolent, of the discovered cars, one was found stained with blood. Defense Minister Bathelemy Simpore denied rumors of a coup d'état happening in the country and urged the people to return to normal activities in the wake of the gunshots.

However, hours later, several news stations reported that President Roch Marc Christian Kaboré had been detained. Kaboré was reportedly detained in the military barracks of the capital, while his whereabouts or situation were still unknown. By the afternoon, the military had taken over the headquarters of the state-run Radio Télévision du Burkina. The headquarters of the ruling People's Movement for Progress was reported to have been torched and looted by pro-military protesters. A statement from the Twitter account of Roch Marc Christian Kaboré urged dialogue and invited the soldiers to lay down arms but did not address whether he was in detention.

"Our Nation is going through difficult times.

At this precise moment, we must safeguard our democratic achievements. I invite those who have taken up arms to lay them down in the Higher Interests of the Nation.

It is through dialogue and listening that we must resolve our contradictions."

— Roch Marc Christian Kaboré (@rochkaborepf)

NetBlocks reported that internet access had been disrupted amid instability in the country. Meanwhile, soldiers were reported to have surrounded the state broadcaster RTB. AFP News reported the president had been arrested along with other government officials. Two security officials said at the Sangoule Lamizana barracks in the capital, "President Kaboré, head of parliament Sakandé, prime minister Zerbo, and the ministers are effectively in the hands of the soldiers."

On the same day, the military announced on television that Kaboré had been deposed from his position as president. After the announcement, the military declared the parliament, government and constitution had been dissolved. The coup d'état was led by military officer Paul-Henri Sandaogo Damiba. Military captain Sidsore Kaber Ouedraogo said the Patriotic Movement for Safeguard and Restoration (MPSR) "has decided to assume its responsibilities before history." In a statement, he said soldiers were putting an end to Kaboré's presidency because of the deteriorating security situation amid the deepening Islamic insurgency and the president's inability to manage the crisis. He said the new military leaders would work to establish a calendar "acceptable to everyone" for holding new elections, without giving further details. The junta spokesman told reporters that the coup had taken place "without any physical violence against those arrested, who are being held in a safe place, with respect for their dignity."

== Aftermath ==
After the coup was launched, the new junta government suspended the government, parliament, and constitution. National borders were shut down and the junta imposed nationwide curfew between 21:00 GMT to 05:00 GMT. The junta government announced they will work to organize fresh elections that will be "acceptable to everyone" without giving further details.

The January 2022 coup occurred against a backdrop of rising jihadist violence and widespread public dissatisfaction with President Roch Marc Christian Kaboré's handling of security. The Economic Community of West African States (ECOWAS) and the African Union condemned the military takeover and suspended Burkina Faso’s membership until constitutional order was restored.

The MPSR shared a hand-written resignation letter by Kaboré, which was also signed, with its authenticity being verified by Reuters. "In the interests of the nation, following events that took place since yesterday, I have decided to resign from my role as president of Burkina Faso," said the letter. A large crowd gathered in the capital Ouagadougou's national square and celebrated the coup, playing music, singing, blowing horns and dancing. Terrestrial television through 9 private channels were blocked amid armed attack on account of license fee sharing.

African Union and ECOWAS suspended Burkina Faso in the aftermath of the coup.

On 31 January, the military junta restored the constitution and appointed Paul-Henri Sandaogo Damiba as interim president. He was sworn in as President on 16 February. On 1 March 2022, a charter planning a 3-year-transition process was approved. The transition period should be followed by the holding of elections. The day after, Paul-Henri Sandaogo Damiba was invested President of Burkina Faso.

On 4 March, the military junta appointed Albert Ouedraogo as the interim Prime Minister. On 6 April, the interim government announced that President Kaboré was released and allowed to go home after being held for almost three months. The Government Information Service (GIS - SIG in French) announced that he remains under surveillance to ensure his security. The information was released in an official press release and shared on social media.

== Reactions ==
=== Domestic ===
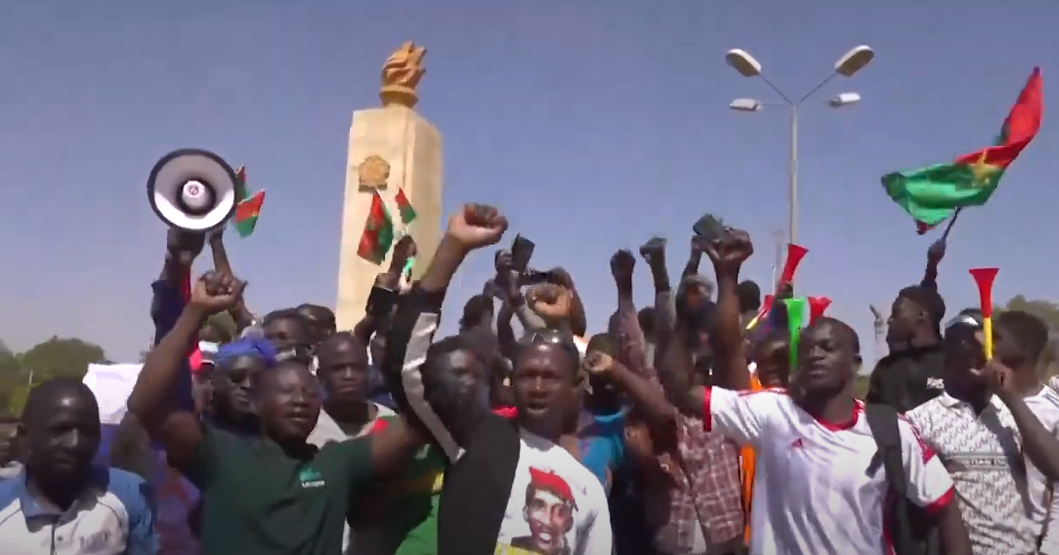
Pro-coup demonstration in Ouagadougou, 25 January

On 24 January, several residents in the capital were seen showing their support to the coup. There were reports that some citizens had taken to the street, burning tires to show solidarity with the soldiers. Some youth groups were reported to have stormed the RTB headquarters to show their support of the military junta.

On 25 January, a large crowd gathered in the capital Ouagadougou's national square and celebrated the coup, playing music, singing, blowing horns and dancing. BBC News senior Africa correspondent Anne Soy said the news of the president's detention was received with cheers and celebrations in Ouagadougou.

A Reuters reporter saw a group burning a French flag, which Reuters described as "a sign of growing frustration about the military role the former colonial power still plays in the region." The reporter also said he saw Russian flags dotting the crowd, and heard several demonstrators calling on Russia to replace France in the fight against jihadists.

Al Jazeera journalist Sam Mednick, said there was "a lot of support for this coup" amid the country's security crisis, he also said people had been rallying and chanting: "Down, down with ECOWAS" over its comments and threat of sanctions.

The ruling People's Movement for Progress denounced the coup, calling it an "assassination attempt" against the president and government.

=== International ===
- Austria: The Federal Ministry for European and International Affairs was greatly concerned about the developments in Burkina Faso. The ministry condemned the coup and called for every actor to choose the path of dialogue.
- Belgium: The Ministry of Foreign Affairs of Belgium said they are monitoring the situation closely and said constitutional change by violence is unacceptable.
- Bulgaria: The Ministry of Foreign Affairs of Bulgaria expressed concern and denounced the announcement of a military takeover, calling for the return to constitutional order.
- Canada: The Canadian government issued a travel warning to Burkina Faso amid the instability in the region.
- China: The Chinese embassy stated it would closely follow the development in the country. It also called on the various parties to resolve differences peacefully by dialogue.
- Denmark: The development cooperation minister of Denmark, Flemming Møller Mortensen, expressed his concern with the situation in Burkina Faso.
- France: The French embassy in the capital issued a warning for French citizens in Burkina Faso to avoid non-essential travel and night driving. The French embassy said they would make a further announcement soon. President Emmanuel Macron condemned the coup stating that France was "clearly, as always" in agreement with the ECOWAS in condemning the coup.
- Luxembourg: Minister for Foreign Affairs of Luxembourg Jean Asselborn said the government was following the situation with great concern and condemned the dismissal of the president and suspension of constitutional order, he also urged both parties to solve the challenges through dialogue.
- Nigeria: The Nigerian federal government, via Foreign Ministry spokesperson Francisca Omayuli, condemned the coup, calling it an "unfortunate development," and called for the release of President Kaboré and other government officials as well returning to the status quo.
- South Africa: South African Foreign Minister Naledi Pandor expressed her shock of the coup and said the region mustn't become a region of coups.
- Sweden: Swedish Foreign Minister Ann Linde denounced the coup and called for respect for the constitutional order, urging all parties to find a peaceful resolution through dialogue.
- Turkey: The Turkish government expressed their concern over the situation in Burkina Faso and urged both parties to restore order. Turkey also expressed their solidarity with the people of Burkina Faso.
- United Kingdom: The FCDO warned against all but essential travel to the capital city, Ouagadougou. It also stated that it is monitoring the situation closely and advised British citizens feeling unsafe to leave the country. Vicky Ford, Minister for Africa, issued a statement condemning the coup.
- United States: The State Department, via spokesperson Ned Price, said they were aware of the reports in Burkina Faso. The State Department also called for immediate release of President Kaboré and urge dialogue between two parties. The United States embassy issued a security alert due to the ongoing security concerns throughout the capital. The embassy said US citizens in the country were advised to take shelter, avoid large crowds, limit movement to emergencies, and monitor local media for updates.

==== Supranational organizations ====
- African Union: Chairperson of the African Union Commission, Moussa Faki, strongly condemned the coup and asked the security forces to return to the barracks. He requested the military to ensure the physical integrity of President Roch Marc Christian Kaboré. Chairperson Félix Tshisekedi also condemned the coup and demanded the unconditional release of President Roch Marc Christian Kaboré. On 31 January, African Union announced suspension of Burkina Faso membership. The African Union's Peace and Security Council said it had voted to suspend Burkina Faso's participation "in all AU activities until the effective restoration of constitutional order in the country."
- ECOWAS urged the military to respect the government as the democratic authority and encouraged dialogue between the government and military. ECOWAS also urged the soldiers to return to barracks. On 24 January, ECOWAS, suspended Burkina Faso in the aftermath of the military coup. The current Ghanaian president and ECOWAS chairman, Nana Akufo-Addo, called the recent spate of coups in West Africa "a direct violation of our democratic tenets." He said "the rest of the world is looking up to us to be firm on this matter." On 28 January, ECOWAS announced suspension of Burkina Faso membership after extraordinary session. On 3 March, ECOWAS canceled an official visit to Burkina Faso after President Damiba's inauguration.
- European Union: European Union High Representative, Josep Borrell, issued a statement on Burkina Faso: "We follow with great concern the evolution of the situation in Burkina Faso. The latest news is very worrying, regarding the detention of President Kaboré, and the occupation of national radio and television by elements of the army. Yesterday I spoke with the Minister of Foreign Affairs of Burkina Faso Rosine Coulibaly and the President of the European Council Charles Michel spoke with the President of Burkina Faso, during the discussions the situation seemed under control. But during today, the news has gotten worse, it is bad, and we now know that President Kaboré is under the control of the army. We call for respect for the constitutional order and for the release of President Kaboré."
- United Nations: Secretary-General of the United Nations, Antonio Guterres, said in a statement he "strongly condemns any attempted takeover of government by the force of arms," and called on the coup leaders to lay down their weapons.

== See also ==
- Burkina Faso coup d'état (disambiguation)
- 2020 Malian coup d'état
- 2022 Guinea-Bissau coup d'état attempt
