= Robert Floyd (diplomat) =

Australian scientist, diplomat (born 1957)

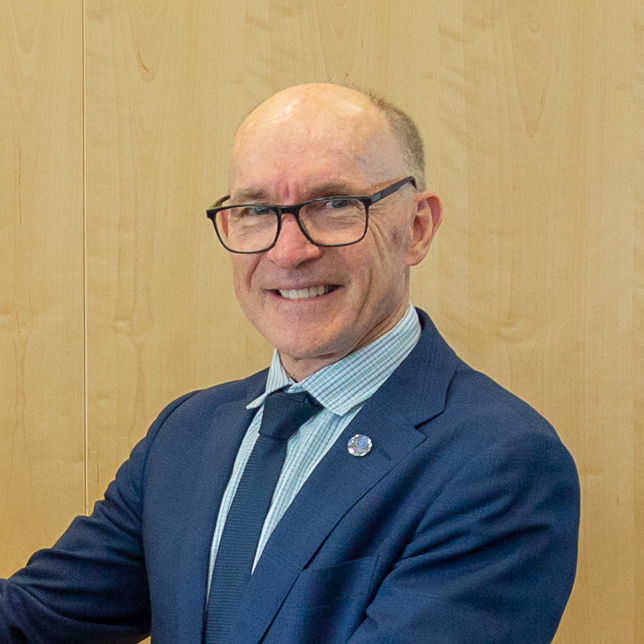
Floyd in 2021

Robert Floyd (born 1957) is an Australian scientist, diplomat, and the current Executive Secretary of the Comprehensive Nuclear-Test-Ban Treaty Organization.

== Early life and education ==
Floyd was born in Australia and holds a B.Sc from the University of New England, 1980 and a Ph.D from Griffith University in biology.

== Career ==
Floyd headed the Department of Prime Minister and Cabinet’s science and technology unit for counter-terrorism until 2010, and was in charge of all security-related research at Commonwealth Scientific and Industrial Research Organisation (CSIRO). Floyd also served as the Director General of the Australian Safeguards and Non-Proliferation Office (ASNO) until 2021.

In 2021, Floyd was elected the Executive Secretary of the Comprehensive Nuclear-Test-Ban Treaty Organization succeeding the incumbent Lassina Zerbo, who was seeking an unprecedented third term, in a contested vote.

During his term, Floyd engaged in high level discussions with the eight countries that would need to ratify the Comprehensive Nuclear Test Ban Treaty. He has acknowledged that bringing the treaty into force is a gradual process, and has focused on promoting the test ban as an international norm. Floyd has also continued the organization’s work in bringing a global ban on nuclear tests in to force through a regional approach, opening discussions with regional bodies. In particular, his term has seen the ratification of the CTBT by all Latin American and Caribbean countries, which Floyd celebrated as "demonstrating the region's exemplary leadership in nuclear non-proliferation and disarmament."

In 2023, Russia announced it would deratify the CTBT, a move Floyd called “very disappointing and deeply regrettable.”
