= Comprehensive Nuclear-Test-Ban Treaty Organization =

International organization

The Comprehensive Nuclear-Test-Ban Treaty Organization (CTBTO) is an international organization that will be established upon the entry into force of the Comprehensive Nuclear-Test-Ban Treaty, a Convention that outlaws nuclear test explosions. Its seat will be in Vienna, Austria. The organization will be tasked with verifying the ban on nuclear tests and will operate therefore a worldwide monitoring system and may conduct on-site inspections. The Preparatory Commission for the CTBTO, and its Provisional Technical Secretariat, were established in 1997 and are headquartered in Vienna, Austria.

== Status ==
The Comprehensive Nuclear-Test-Ban Treaty will enter into force 180 days after the Treaty has been ratified by 44 States, listed in Annex 2 of the Treaty, which were designated to have a nuclear reactor or at least some advanced level of nuclear technology. As of November 2023, 41 of these Annex 2 states have signed the treaty and 35 have ratified. India, North Korea and Pakistan have not signed or ratified the treaty; China, Egypt, Iran, Israel and the United States have signed but have not ratified; while Russia signed and ratified the treaty but subsequently withdrew its ratification prior to its entry into force. The organization's scientific reporting claims 2.4 million persons will eventually die from cancers developed as a result of atmospheric atomic tests conducted between 1945 and 1980.

== Preparatory Commission ==
The Preparatory Commission was established in 1997 and is tasked with making preparations for effective implementation of the Treaty, in particular by establishing its verification regime. The main task is establishing and provisionally operating the 337-facility International Monitoring System (IMS), including its International Data Centre (IDC) and Global Communications Infrastructure (GCI). The Commission is tasked also with the development of operational manuals, including a manual to guide conduct of on-site inspections.

== International Monitoring System (IMS) and Communications infrastructure ==
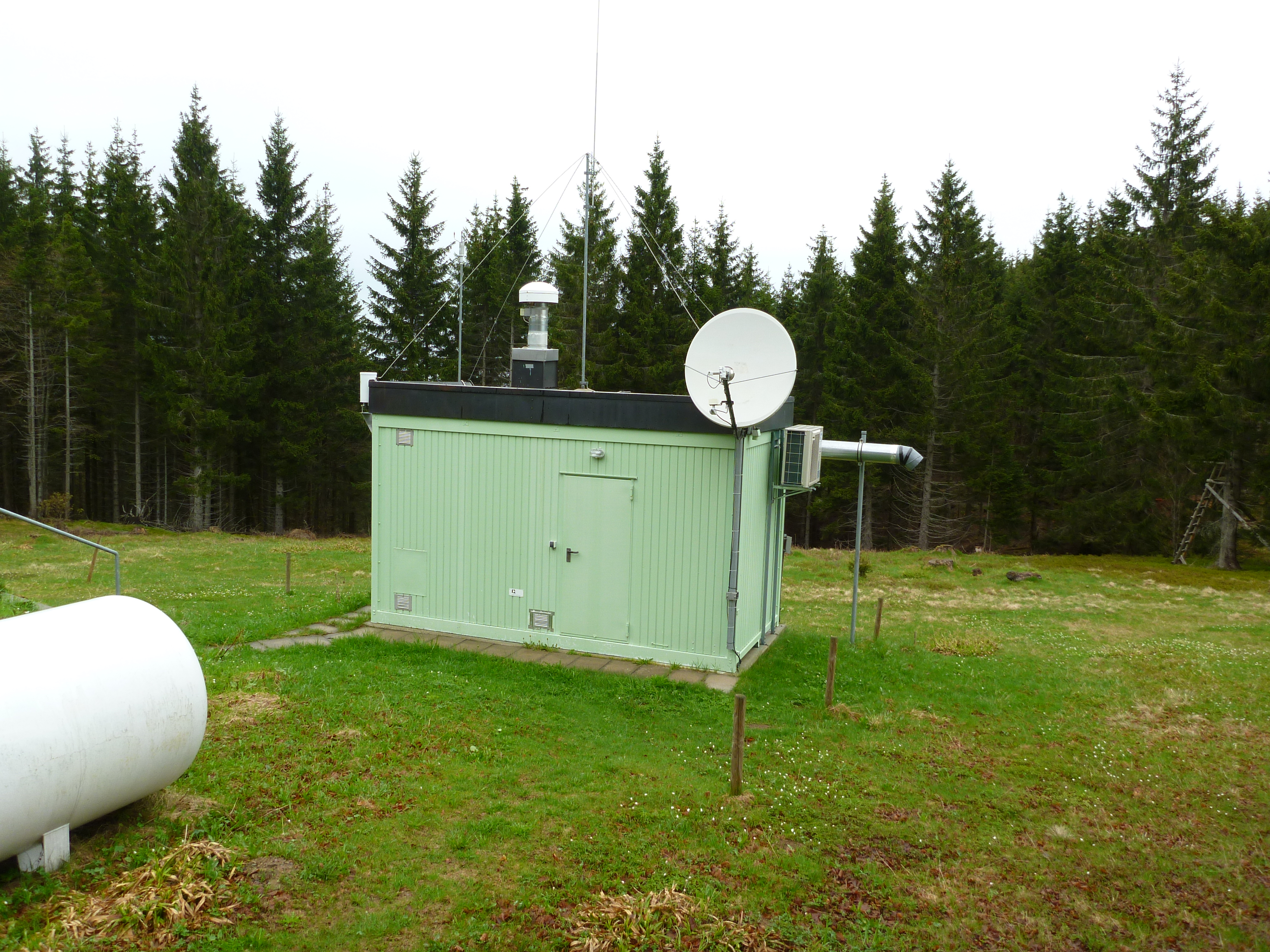
Radionuclide station on Schauinsland in Germany

The IMS, when completed, will consist of:

- 50 primary and 120 auxiliary seismic monitoring stations.
- 11 hydro-acoustic stations detecting acoustic waves in the oceans.
- 60 infra-sound stations using microbarographs (acoustic pressure sensors) to detect very low-frequency sound waves.
- 80 radionuclide stations using air samplers to detect radioactive particles released from atmospheric explosions and/or vented from underground or under-water explosions.
- 16 radionuclide laboratories for analysis of samples from the radionuclide stations.

Data from all stations are transmitted to the CTBTO International Data Centre (IDC) in Vienna through a global private data network known as GCI, which is largely based on satellite (VSAT) links.

States Parties will have equal and direct access to all IMS data, raw or processed, for verification as well as civilian uses. The Preparatory Commission has started the building and verification of the system of which as of 2023 about 90% was operational.

== Consultation and Clarification (C&C) ==
States Parties to the Treaty are encouraged to conduct a Consultation and Clarification process (C&C) before requesting an on-site inspection. The state that has concerns about an ambiguous event should, whenever possible, make any effort to clarify it through consultations with the state in whose territory this event occurred, either directly or through the Organization.

== On Site Inspection (OSI) ==
If an event detected by the IMS (or by other means) raises concerns about violation of the basic obligations of the CTBT, an OSI may be conducted to clarify whether a nuclear explosion has taken place. Such an inspection could take place only after entry into force of the Treaty, and would require agreement by at least 30 of the 51 members of the CTBTO's Executive Council. An inspection area of up to 1000 square kilometres would be searched by a team of inspectors (up to 40). Only State Parties to the Treaty may submit a request for an OSI.

When conducting an OSI, a number of detection techniques can be used. These techniques include position finding, visual observation, passive seismic measurements and radioactivity measurements including gamma radiation and radioactive noble gases such as argon-37 and isotopes of xenon for an initial period of up to 25 days. Further, for a continuation period of up to 60 days, more intrusive measurements can be used on-site including active and resonance seismic measurements as well as ground penetrating radar, gravity, and electric and magnetic field mappings. Argon-37 field measurement is a unique technology specially developed for the purpose of OSI. Drilling to obtain radioactive samples from a suspected underground explosion site is also allowed. Data collected from various methods have to be fused and interpreted for decision making purposes. An important task of the CTBTO is to explore how recent scientific and technical advances in these technologies can be applied to an OSI.

== Confidence-building measures ==
In addition to the IMS, C&C and OSI, the verification regime of the CTBT includes also the fourth element of Confidence-Building Measures. This requires States Parties to the treaty to notify the Organization, if possible in advance, of any chemical explosion using 300 tonnes or greater of TNT equivalent blasting material to be detonated. This is required in order to contribute to the timely resolution of any compliance concerns and to assist in the calibration of IMS stations.

== See also ==
- Global Security Institute
