= Microbarometer =

Type of barometer

Microbarometers are sensitive barometers that can measure air pressure with high precision. Microbarometers typically have a resolution of microbars (μbar) or pascals (Pa), while ordinary barometers can only resolve in hectopascals (hPa) or millibars (mbar). Recording microbarometers, or microbarographs, distributed around the world are planned to be used to monitor compliance with the Comprehensive Nuclear-Test-Ban Treaty (upon entry into force) by detecting the infrasound signature of a nuclear explosion, which can propagate for very long distances. By analyzing the data received at several of these monitoring stations, the location and yield of the explosion can be determined.

A microbarometer used as a pressure altimeter would be able to resolve altitude differences on the order of centimeters, but for the presence of infrasonic noise such as microbaroms.
