= Preparatory Commission for the Comprehensive Nuclear-Test-Ban Treaty Organization =

Intergovernmental organization for nuclear-test banning

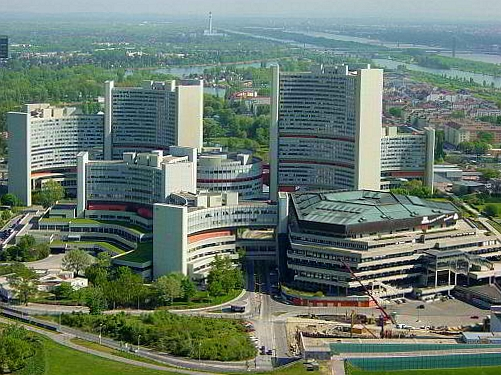
- The Commission's headquarters are located at the Vienna International Centre.
- Abbreviation: CTBTO Preparatory Commission
- Formation: 19 November 1996; 29 years ago
- Founded at: United Nations Headquarters, New York City
- Type: Intergovernmental
- Purpose: Prepare for the entry into force of the Comprehensive Nuclear-Test-Ban Treaty.
- Headquarters: Vienna International Centre; Vienna, Austria
- Coordinates: 48.234722°N 16.416944°E
- Fields: Nuclear disarmament
- Members: 188 Member States (2024)
- Executive Secretary: Robert Floyd
- Budget: $128.1 million (2018)
- Staff: 278 (2018)
- Website: www.ctbto.org

The Preparatory Commission for the Comprehensive Nuclear-Test-Ban Treaty Organization, or CTBTO Preparatory Commission, is an international organization based in Vienna, Austria, that is tasked with building up the verification regime of the Comprehensive Nuclear-Test-Ban Treaty Organization (CTBTO). The organization was established by the States Signatories to the Comprehensive Nuclear-Test-Ban Treaty (CTBT) in 1996.

Its main purpose is twofold: to promote the entry into force of the CTBT, and to establish a global verification regime in preparation for the Treaty's entry into force.

As the CTBTO Preparatory Commission is an interim organization, it will be dissolved once the CTBT enters into force and will be replaced by the CTBTO, with all its assets being transferred to the CTBTO. This change will occur at the close of the first Conference of States Parties of the CTBT, which will take place when the Treaty has entered into force. For the Treaty to enter into force, the following states need to ratify the CTBT: China, North Korea, Egypt, India, Iran, Israel, Pakistan, Russia, and the United States. Entry into force will occur 180 days after these states ratify the Treaty.

== Organization ==
The commission is composed of two main organs, the Plenary Body and the Provisional Technical Secretariat.

=== Plenary Body ===
The Plenary Body, sometimes called the Preparatory Commission, is composed of all States Signatories of the CTBT. The work of the Body is assisted by the following working groups:

- Working Group A
  - Deals with budgetary and administrative matters.
- Working Group B
  - Deals with the examination of verification issues.
- The Advisory Group
  - Advises the Preparatory Commission on financial, budgetary and associated administrative matters.

=== Provisional Technical Secretariat ===
The Provisional Technical Secretariat (PTS) assists the Preparatory Commission in carrying out its activities, as well as working to fulfill its mandate. The work of the Secretariat is divided amongst three main technical divisions:

- International Monitoring System Division
- International Data Centre Division
- On-Site Inspection Division

Additionally, these technical divisions are supported by the Legal and External Relations Division and the Division of Administration.

The Secretariat is headed by an Executive Secretary, the current of which is Robert Floyd of Australia. Floyd began his tenure as Executive Secretary of the Comprehensive Nuclear-Test-Ban Treaty Organization (CTBTO) on 1 August 2021. He is the fourth Executive Secretary of the CTBTO.

In January 2016, the CTBTO launched the CTBTO Youth Group, an initiative to engage the next generation of policymakers, maybe legislators, as well as the thinkers and academics of the next generation. The CTBTO Youth Group has more than 1,200 members, as of late 2021.

== Membership ==
Participation in the Comprehensive Nuclear-Test-Ban Treaty Annex 2, signed and ratified Annex 2, signed Annex 2, non-signatory Not Annex 2, signed and ratified Not Annex 2, signed Not Annex 2, non-signatory

All states which are signatories to the CTBT are automatically members of the CTBTO Preparatory Commission.

As of July 2026 there are 188 member states of the CTBTO Preparatory Commission, the latest of which to join was Tonga, which ratified the treaty on 7 July 2026. Of these, 179 have ratified the Treaty.

=== Annex 2 States ===
Annex 2 States are those states that participated in the negotiations of the CTBT, and were also members of the Conference on Disarmament, which possessed nuclear power or research reactors at the time. In order for the CTBT to enter into force all 44 of these states must sign and ratify the Treaty. The following are the Annex 2 States:

Annex 2 States
Algeria, Argentina, Australia, Austria, Bangladesh, Belgium, Brazil, Bulgaria, Canada, Chile, China*, Colombia, Democratic People's Republic of Korea*, Democratic Republic of the Congo, Egypt*, Finland, France, Germany, Hungary, India*, Indonesia, Islamic Republic of Iran, Israel*, Italy, Japan, Mexico, Netherlands, Norway, Pakistan*, Peru, Poland, Republic of Korea, Romania, Russian Federation*, Slovakia, South Africa, Spain, Sweden, Switzerland, Turkey, Ukraine, United Kingdom, United States of America*, Vietnam
* Have not ratified

== Leadership ==
=== Preparatory Commission ===
The following compose the leadership of the Preparatory Commission:

Name	Country	Position
Robert Floyd	Australia	Executive Secretary
Maria Assunta Accili Sabbatini	Italy	Chairperson
Alfredo Raul Chuquihuara Chil	Peru	Chairperson on Administration
Joachim Schulze	Germany	Chairperson on Verification
Michael Weston	United Kingdom	Chairperson, Advisory Group

=== List of Executive Secretaries ===
Name	Country	Term	Reference(s)
Wolfgang Hoffmann	Germany	3 March 1997 – 31 July 2005	
Tibor Tóth	Hungary	1 August 2005 – 31 July 2013	
Lassina Zerbo	Burkina Faso	1 August 2013 – 31 July 2021	
Robert Floyd	Australia	1 August 2021 - Incumbent	

== Verification regime ==
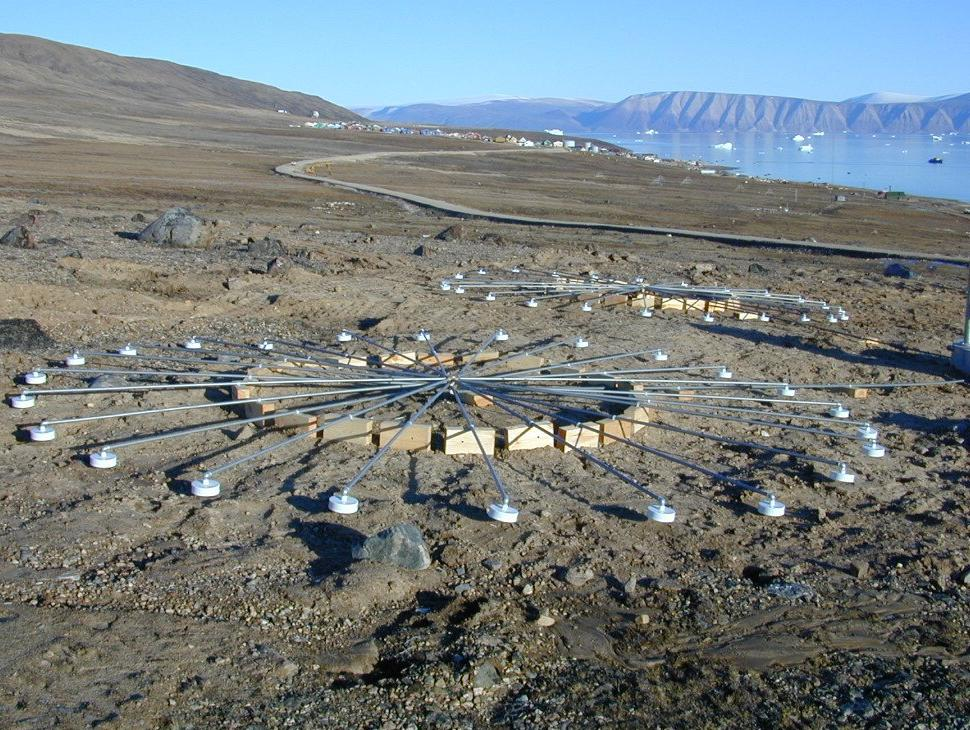
Infrasound arrays at IMS infrasound station IS18, Qaanaaq, Greenland

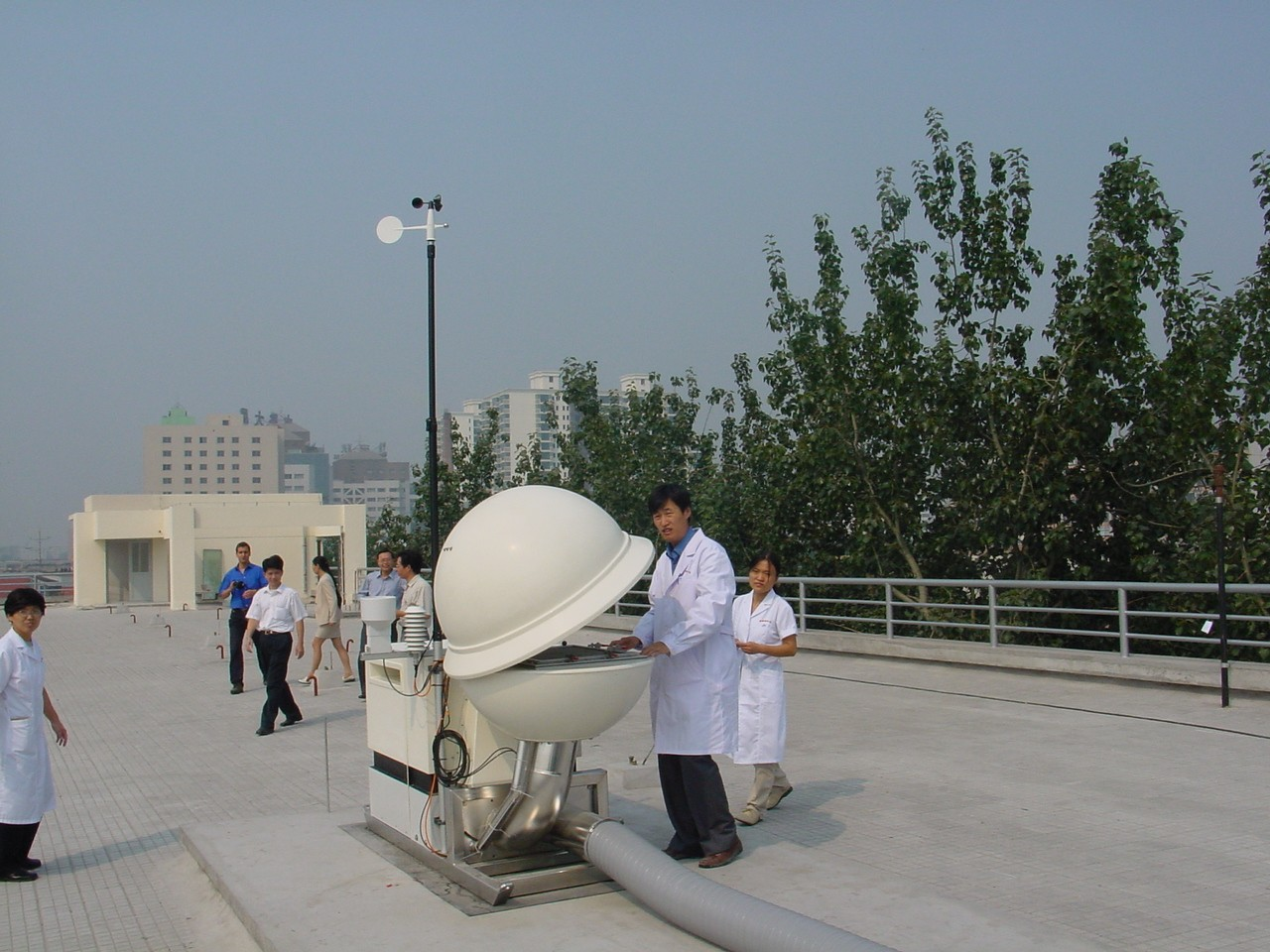
IMS Radionuclide station RN20, Beijing, China. The station is also equipped for noble gas monitoring.

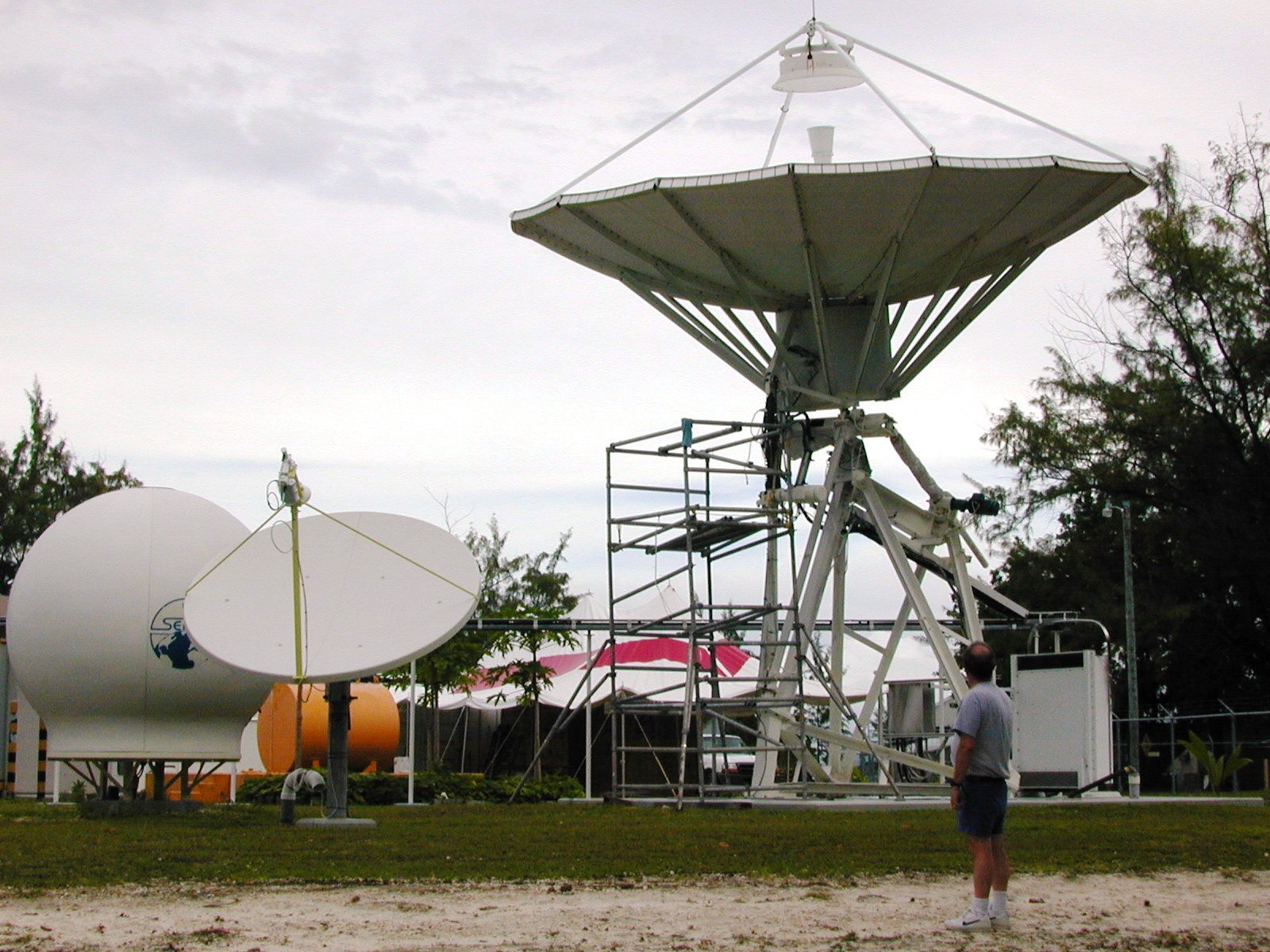
Communication systems at hydroacoustic station HA08 at British Indian Ocean Territory

The Preparatory Commission has started building the global systems for the detection of nuclear tests required for the success of the CTBTO. The system consists of the following elements to verify that a nuclear test has occurred: the International Monitoring System, the International Data Centre, a Global Communications Infrastructure, Consultation and clarification, On-Site Inspection and Confidence-building measures.

=== International Monitoring System (IMS) ===
The International Monitoring System consists of 337 facilities worldwide to monitor the planet for signs of nuclear explosions. This will include 321 monitoring stations, as well as 16 laboratories. On 19 November 2018, the CTBTO announced that all 21 monitoring facilities located in Australia were completed "and sending reliable, high-quality data ... in Vienna, Austria, for analysis." Regular conferences are held for the wider scientific community as well as diplomats, international media and civil society.

IMS comprises:

- 170 seismic monitoring stations (50 primary + 120 auxiliary)
  - The seismic monitoring system monitors for underground nuclear explosions. These stations measure waves generated by seismic events that travel through the Earth. The data collected by these stations helps locate and distinguish a seismic event between naturally occurring events and man-made seismic events.
  - The primary stations are online 24/7 and deliver seismic data to the International Data Centre (IDC) continuously and in real time.
  - The auxiliary stations provide data upon request.
- 11 hydroacoustic monitoring stations (6 hydrophone + 5 T-Phase)
  - The hydroacoustic monitoring system monitors for underwater nuclear explosions. These stations measure waves generated by seismic events that travel through the ocean and help distinguish between naturally occurring and man-made events. Data collected by these stations is transmitted to the IDC 24/7 in real time via satellite.
  - The hydrophone stations are located underwater and use microphones to monitor changes in water pressure caused by sound waves, which can then be converted to measurable electric signals.
  - The T-Phase stations are located on islands and monitor waterborne acoustic energy, i.e. waves, when it makes landfall.
- 60 infrasound monitoring stations
  - The infrasound monitoring system monitors for micro-pressure changes in Earth's atmosphere, which are caused by infrasonic waves. These waves have a low frequency and cannot be heard by human ears, and can be caused by nuclear explosions.
  - The data collected by these stations helps locate and distinguish an atmospheric event between naturally occurring events and man-made events. This data is transmitted to the IDC 24/7 in real time.
- 96 radionuclide monitoring stations (80 stations + 16 laboratories)
  - The radionuclide monitoring system monitors the atmosphere for airborne radioactive elements. The presence of specific radionuclides provides unambiguous evidence of a nuclear explosion. Monitoring for radionuclides occurs 24/7.
  - The radionuclide monitoring stations use air samplers to detect radioactive particles released from atmospheric explosions and/or vented from underground or under-water explosions. Forty of these stations are equipped with noble gas detection devices.
  - The radionuclide laboratories are independent from the IMS and analyze samples only when their services are required. These laboratories analyze samples collected by the monitoring stations suspected of containing radionuclide materials that may have been produced by a nuclear explosion.

In 2022-2023 the seismic data collected from IMS detected (kinetic) Russian conventional attacks on Ukraine. Such is the wide net cast for assorted phenomena by IMS that analysis its plethora of data has discovered the song of heretofore unknown (and as yet unseen) pygmy sperm whales. The manifold data are also used by volcanologists, and to monitor ambient shipping noise and the infrasound of the aurora borealis and australis. It has even registered the infrasound of a 10 cm earth-grazing meteor. Annual conferences are held for the wider scientific community, national departments involved in the CBTO's work, diplomats, independent academic and research institutions, the media, and civil society at large.

=== Global Communications Infrastructure ===
The Global Communications Infrastructure (GCI) transmits all data collected by the 337 IMS stations in real time to the IDC in Vienna, where it will be processed. This data is transmitted via a network of six satellites and over 250 VSAT links.

Additionally, the GCI is used to transmit raw data from the IMS stations to Member States, as well as data bulletins from the IDC.

=== International Data Centre ===
The International Data Centre (IDC) collects, processes and analyzes data from the 337 IMS stations. It then produces data bulletins, which are sent to the Member States. The IDC also archives all data and data bulletins in its computer center.

Incoming data are used to register, locate and analyze events, with an emphasis on detecting nuclear explosions. Analysts review these data and prepare a quality-controlled bulletin to send out to the Member States. The IDC has sent out IMS station data and IDC data bulletins to Member States since 21 February 2000.

=== On-site inspection ===
The most intrusive verification measure under the CTBT is an on-site inspection. On-site inspection (OSI), involving a comprehensive search of a designated inspection area of up to 1000 km^{2}, can only be requested by States Parties to the CTBT following entry into force of the Treaty, and are launched in order to ascertain whether or not a nuclear explosion has been conducted in violation of the Treaty. Once an on-site inspection has been requested the State Party sought to be inspected cannot refuse to allow it to take place.

The Treaty defines specific activities and techniques that can be applied during an OSI. These activities and techniques become more intrusive as the inspection progresses and serve as the means by which an inspection team gathers facts that shed light on the event that led to the request for an OSI. In most cases, this requires the deployment of complex technical equipment and detailed procedures with the CTBTO working to identify required specifications, develop and test detection methods, and acquire and maintain equipment covering all OSI techniques for ongoing equipment testing and inspector training.

Inspection methodology is critical for an OSI and follows a multilevel concept called inspection team functionality. This concept describes the decision making, communication, reporting structures and procedures required for the functioning of an inspection team during an OSI. The framework for the technical and scientific work of the inspection team is the information-led search logic designed to maximize efficiency and effectiveness in collecting facts and information.

At the centre of an OSI will be a team of up to 40 inspectors, including experts in the application of the OSI techniques listed above as well as ancillary functions such as health and safety, operations and logistics support. Following the conclusion of an inspection, the inspection team will report its findings to the Director-General of the CTBTO. In preparation for EIF, the Commission is continuously developing, testing and refining a detailed inspector training programme.

Exercises play an integral role in efforts to build up the OSI element of the verification regime established by the Treaty and to reinforce its significant role in the international framework of nuclear non-proliferation and disarmament. Exercises allow various inspection activities, techniques, processes and procedures to be tested and refined in the context of a tactical scenario environment. The organization conducts a variety of exercises, the main difference being the objectives, scope and environment in which they take place (i.e. indoors, outdoors or a combination thereof).

=== Consultation and clarification ===
If a Member State feels that a date bulletin from the IDC implies a nuclear explosion, it can request a consultation and clarification process. This allows a State, through the Executive Council of the CTBTO, to request from another State clarification on a suspected nuclear explosion. A State that has received such a request has 48 hours to clarify the event in question.

However, this process can only be triggered after the CTBT enters into force.

=== Confidence-building measures ===
In order to fine-tune the IMS network, and to build confidence in the system, Member States are advised to notify the CTBTO Technical Secretariat in the case of any chemical explosion using more than 300 tonnes of TNT-equivalent blasting material. This ensures that there is no misinterpretation of verification data and that they are not accused of performing nuclear explosion.

However, this is done on a voluntary basis.

== Preparatory Commission's data ==
While the data collected by the Preparatory Commission can be used to detect nuclear tests, it can also be used by civil society, as well as for scientific uses. This information is particularly useful in the field of disaster mitigation and early warning. In 2006, the CTBTO started providing seismic and hydroacoustic data directly to tsunami warning centers. As of 2012, data is shared with tsunami warning centers in eight countries, mainly in the Indo-Pacific region.

Throughout the Fukushima Daiichi nuclear disaster of March 2011, the CTBTO's radionuclide stations tracked the dispersion of radioactivity on a global scale. More than 1600 detections of radioactive isotopes from the crippled nuclear reactor were picked up by over 40 CTBTO radionuclide monitoring stations. The CTBTO shared its data and analysis with its 188 Member States, as well as international organizations and some 1,200 scientific and academic institutions in 120 countries.

The CTBTO also recorded the infrasound produced in the atmosphere by the meteor explosion over Chelyabinsk, Russia in 2013. Seventeen stations around the world, including one in the Antarctic, recorded the event as the infrasound reverberated around the world multiple times.

Recordings from CTBTO hydrophones was analyzed to determine an impact location for Air France Flight 447 and Malaysia Airlines Flight 370, both of which were lost without a known crash site. No data was detected in the event of Flight 447, even after it was reassessed once the location of the wreckage was known. As of July 2014, Flight 370 remains missing with no known crash site or confirmed debris. Since the only evidence for Flight 370's final resting site comes from an analysis of its satellite transmissions, which has resulted in an imprecise and very large search area, hydroacoustic recordings from CTBTO were analyzed to potentially determine and locate its impact with the Indian Ocean. Analysis of available hydroacoustic recordings (including those made by a CTBTO hydrophone located off Cape Leeuwin, Western Australia) identified one event which may be associated with Flight 370.

Other potential civil and scientific applications include the use of CTBTO data and technologies in civil aviation and shipping and in climate change research.

== Verification regime in action ==
In the morning of 9 October 2006, North Korea set off a nuclear explosion. It detonated a nuclear device at a test site in the northeast of the country. The CTBTO's global monitoring network detected the low yield explosion with 22 of its seismic stations. Within two hours of the explosion, CTBTO Member States received initial information about the time, location and magnitude of the blast.

Two weeks after the blast, a monitoring station at Yellowknife in northern Canada detected traces of the radioactive noble gas xenon in the air. The presence of xenon provides evidence that a nuclear explosion has taken place. This detection confirmed that the 2006 North Korean nuclear test was a nuclear explosion. Analysts at the CTBTO then used special calculations to backtrack the detected xenon to determine its source. The calculation indicated that the detected noble gas originated from North Korea.

North Korea conducted a second nuclear test on 25 May 2009. Seismic data indicated an unusually large underground explosion. The blast took place only a few kilometers from where the first nuclear device had been detonated in 2006.

Considerably more seismic stations registered the explosion in 2009 than in 2006. This was due to the greater magnitude of the blast and the higher number of monitoring stations in operation. Two hours after the test, the CTBTO presented initial findings to its Member States. The information available also helped analysts to identify a far smaller area as the location of the explosion. In 2009 the estimated area covered 264 km^{2} compared to 880 km^{2} in 2006.

In the morning of 12 February 2013 (at 02.57.51 UTC), the CTBTO monitoring system detected another unusual seismic event in North Korea, which measured 4.9 in magnitude. Later that morning, North Korea announced that it had conducted a third nuclear test. The event was registered by 94 seismic stations and two infrasound stations in the CTBTO's network. The first automatic analysis of location, time and magnitude was made available to Member States in less than an hour. The analysed data showed the event's location (with a certainty of about +/- 8.1 km) was largely identical with the two previous nuclear tests (Lat.: 41.313 degrees north; long.: 129.101 degrees east). As with the two previous nuclear tests, the signal was emitted from close to the surface.

The CTBTO radionuclide network later made a significant detection of radioactive isotopes of xenon – xenon-131m and xenon-133 – that could be attributed to the nuclear test. The detection was made at the radionuclide station in Takasaki, Japan, located at around 1,000 kilometres, or 620 miles, from the North Korean test site. Lower levels were picked up at another station in Ussuriysk, Russia. Using Atmospheric Transport Modelling, which calculates the three-dimensional travel path of airborne radioactivity on the basis of weather data, the North Korean test site was identified as a possible source for the emission.

On 22/23 June 2020 radionuclide stations in and near Stockholm, Sweden, detected unusually high levels of caesium-134, caesium-137 and ruthenium-103 and around the Baltic Sea.
