= Alassane Bala Sakandé =

Burkinabé politician

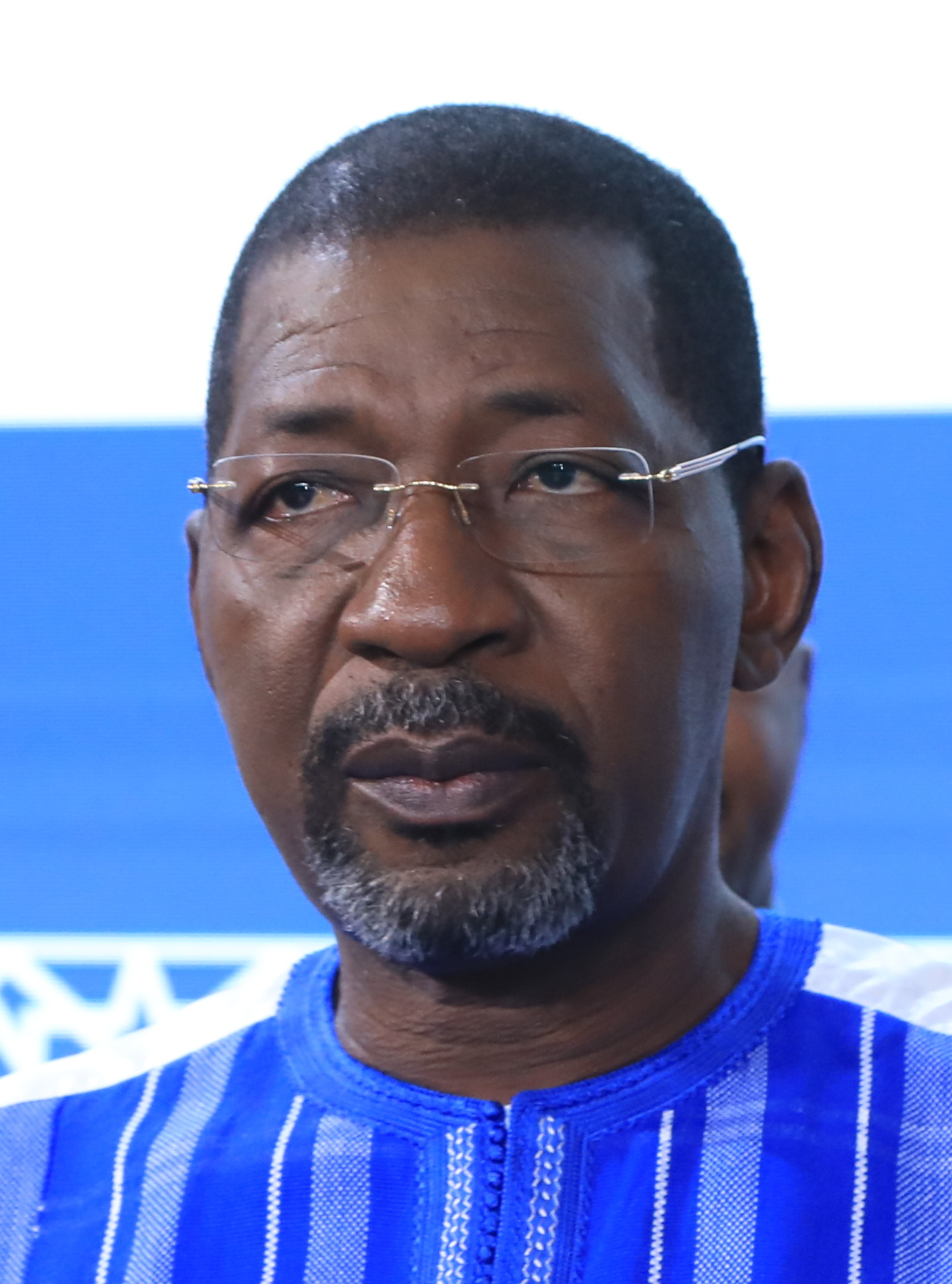

Alassane Bala Sakandé (born 21 August 1969)is a politician and bank executive from Burkina Faso who served as President of the National Assembly of Burkina Faso after death of Salif Diallo and National President of People's Movement for Progress. He was elected on 8 September 2017 and deposed on 24 January 2022.
