= Comprehensive Nuclear-Test-Ban Treaty =

1996 treaty banning all nuclear weapons testing

Comprehensive Nuclear-Test-Ban Treaty (CTBT)
- Signed and ratified Signed but not ratified Non-signatory; Sovereign states listed in Annex 2; Sovereign states not listed in Annex 2
- Signed: 24 September 1996; 29 years ago
- Location: New York City
- Effective: Not in force 9 Annex 2 states still need to take further action for the treaty to enter into force. 6 are signatories who have not ratified: China, Egypt, Iran, Israel, Russia and the United States. 3 are non-signatories and have not ratified: India, Pakistan, and North Korea.
- Condition: 180 days after ratification by all 44 Annex 2 countries: Algeria, Argentina, Australia, Austria, Bangladesh, Belgium, Brazil, Bulgaria, Canada, Chile, China, Colombia, Egypt, Finland, France, Germany, Hungary, India, Indonesia, Iran, Israel, Italy, Japan, Mexico, Netherlands, North Korea, Norway, Pakistan, Peru, Poland, Romania, Russia, Slovakia, South Africa, South Korea, Spain, Sweden, Switzerland, Turkey, Ukraine, United Kingdom, United States, Vietnam, Zaire
- Signatories: 188
- Ratifiers: 179
- Depositary: Secretary-General of the United Nations
- Languages: Arabic, Chinese, English, French, Russian, and Spanish
- ctbto.org

The Comprehensive Nuclear-Test-Ban Treaty (CTBT) is a multilateral treaty to ban nuclear weapons test explosions and any other nuclear explosions, for both civilian and military purposes, in all environments. It was adopted by the United Nations General Assembly on 10 September 1996, but has not entered into force, as it has not been ratified by all the required states. The treaty will establish the Comprehensive Nuclear-Test-Ban Treaty Organization to oversee monitoring, which is currently done by a Preparatory Commission.

Despite not being in force, the CTBT has established a global norm against nuclear testing, reinforced by nuclear testing moratoria declared by the five nuclear-weapon states recognized under the Treaty on the Non-Proliferation of Nuclear Weapons (NPT): China, France, Russia, the United Kingdom, and the United States. Since the treaty's opening for signature in 1996, only sixteen nuclear tests have been conducted, all by non-signatory states: Pokhran-II by India and Chagai-I by Pakistan in May 1998, and six tests by North Korea from 2006 to 2017. Over 2,000 nuclear tests were conducted between 1945 and 1996, primarily by the United States and the Soviet Union.

The CTBT's International Monitoring System is a global nuclear detonation detection system. It is intended to comprise 321 monitoring stations and 16 laboratories across 89 countries, of which ~90% are already operational. The stations collect one of seismic, infrasonic, hydroacoustic, and radionuclide signatures of nuclear explosions. The IMS successfully characterized all six North Korean nuclear tests, and also collects large datasets valuable to scientists for astrophysics, biology, and geology and more.

As of 2026, 188 states have signed and 179 states have ratified the treaty. The treaty designates an "Annex 2" list of states, which must all ratify the CTBT for it to enter into force. These states possessed any nuclear reactors at the time. Nine Annex 2 states have yet to ratify: the six signatories China, Egypt, Iran, Israel, Russia, and the United States, and the three non-signatories India, Pakistan, and North Korea. Israel is also widely believed to possess nuclear weapons, and the nuclear program of Iran is heavily scrutinized internationally.

The CTBT was negotiated in 1995-96 in the Conference on Disarmament with a final phase of negotiations in the UN General Assembly. It built on two major previous treaties, the 1963 Partial Nuclear Test Ban Treaty and the 1968 NPT, as well as the 1974 Threshold Test Ban Treaty between the US and Soviet Union limiting the yields of their underground tests to less than 150 kilotons of TNT.

While the United States was the first nation to sign the CTBT, the United States Senate rejected ratification in 1999. In 2023, in the context of the Russo-Ukrainian war, Russia withdrew its ratification of the CTBT. Non-ratifying states typically explain their reasoning via the non-ratification of a rival, or other regional stability issues.

== History ==
=== Background ===
The movement for international control of nuclear weapons began in 1945, with a call from Canada and the United Kingdom for a conference on the subject. In June 1946, Bernard Baruch, an emissary of President Harry S. Truman, proposed the Baruch Plan before the United Nations Atomic Energy Commission, which called for an international system of controls on the production of atomic energy. The plan, which would serve as the basis for U.S. nuclear policy into the 1950s, was rejected by the Soviet Union as a US ploy to cement its nuclear dominance.

Between the Trinity nuclear test of 16 July 1945 and the signing of the Partial Test Ban Treaty (PTBT) on 5 August 1963, 499 nuclear tests were conducted. Much of the impetus for the PTBT, the precursor to the CTBT, was rising public concern surrounding the size and resulting nuclear fallout from underwater and atmospheric nuclear tests, particularly tests of powerful thermonuclear weapons (hydrogen bombs). The Castle Bravo test of 1 March 1954, in particular, attracted significant attention as the detonation resulted in fallout that spread over inhabited areas and sickened a group of Japanese fishermen. Between 1945 and 1963, the US conducted 215 atmospheric tests, the Soviet Union conducted 219, the UK conducted 21, and France conducted 4.

In 1954, following the Castle Bravo test, Prime Minister Jawaharlal Nehru of India issued the first appeal for a "standstill agreement" on testing, which was soon echoed by the British Labour Party. Negotiations on a comprehensive test ban, primarily involving the US, UK, and the Soviet Union, began in 1955 following a proposal by Soviet first secretary Nikita Khrushchev. Of primary concern throughout the negotiations, which would stretch—with some interruptions—to July 1963, was the system of verifying compliance with the test ban and detecting illicit tests. On the Western side, there were concerns that the Soviet Union would be able to circumvent any test ban and secretly leap ahead in the nuclear arms race. These fears were amplified following the US Rainier shot of 19 September 1957, which was the first contained underground test of a nuclear weapon. Though the US held a significant advantage in underground testing capabilities, there was worry that the Soviet Union would be able to covertly conduct underground tests during a test ban, as underground detonations were more challenging to detect than above-ground tests. On the Soviet side, conversely, the on-site compliance inspections demanded by the US and UK were seen as amounting to espionage. Disagreement over verification would lead to the Anglo-American and Soviet negotiators abandoning a comprehensive test ban (i.e., a ban on all tests, including those underground) in favor of a partial ban, which would be finalized on 25 July 1963. The PTBT, joined by 123 states following the original three parties, banned detonations for military and civilian purposes underwater, in the atmosphere, and outer space.

The PTBT had mixed results. On the one hand, enactment of the treaty was followed by a substantial drop in the atmospheric concentration of radioactive particles. On the other hand, nuclear proliferation was not halted entirely (though it may have been slowed) and nuclear testing continued at a rapid clip. Compared to the 499 tests from 1945 to the signing of the PTBT, 436 tests were conducted over the ten years following the PTBT. Furthermore, US and Soviet underground testing continued "venting" radioactive gas into the atmosphere. Additionally, though underground testing was generally safer than above-ground testing, underground tests continued to risk the leaking of radionuclides, including plutonium, into the ground. From 1964 through 1996, the year of the CTBT's adoption, an estimated 1,377 underground nuclear tests were conducted. The final non-underground (atmospheric or underwater) test was conducted by China in 1980.

The PTBT has been seen as a step towards the Nuclear Non-proliferation Treaty (NPT) of 1968, which directly referenced the PTBT. Under the NPT, non-nuclear weapon states were prohibited from possessing, manufacturing, and acquiring nuclear weapons or other nuclear explosive devices. All signatories, including nuclear weapon states, were committed to the goal of total nuclear disarmament. However, India, Pakistan, and Israel have declined to sign the NPT on the grounds that such a treaty is fundamentally discriminatory as it places limitations on states that do not have nuclear weapons while making no efforts to curb weapons development by declared nuclear weapons states.

=== A comprehensive ban ===
In 1974, a step towards a comprehensive test ban was made with the Threshold Test Ban Treaty (TTBT), ratified by the US and Soviet Union, which banned underground tests with yields above 150 kilotons. In April 1976, the two states reached agreement on the Peaceful Nuclear Explosions Treaty (PNET), which concerns nuclear detonations outside the weapons sites discussed in the TTBT. As in the TTBT, the US and Soviet Union agreed to bar peaceful nuclear explosions (PNEs) at these other locations with yields above 150 kilotons, as well as group explosions with total yields over 1,500 kilotons. To verify compliance, the PNET requires that states rely on national technical means of verification, share information on explosions, and grant on-site access to counterparties. The TTBT and PNET entered into force on 11 December 1990.

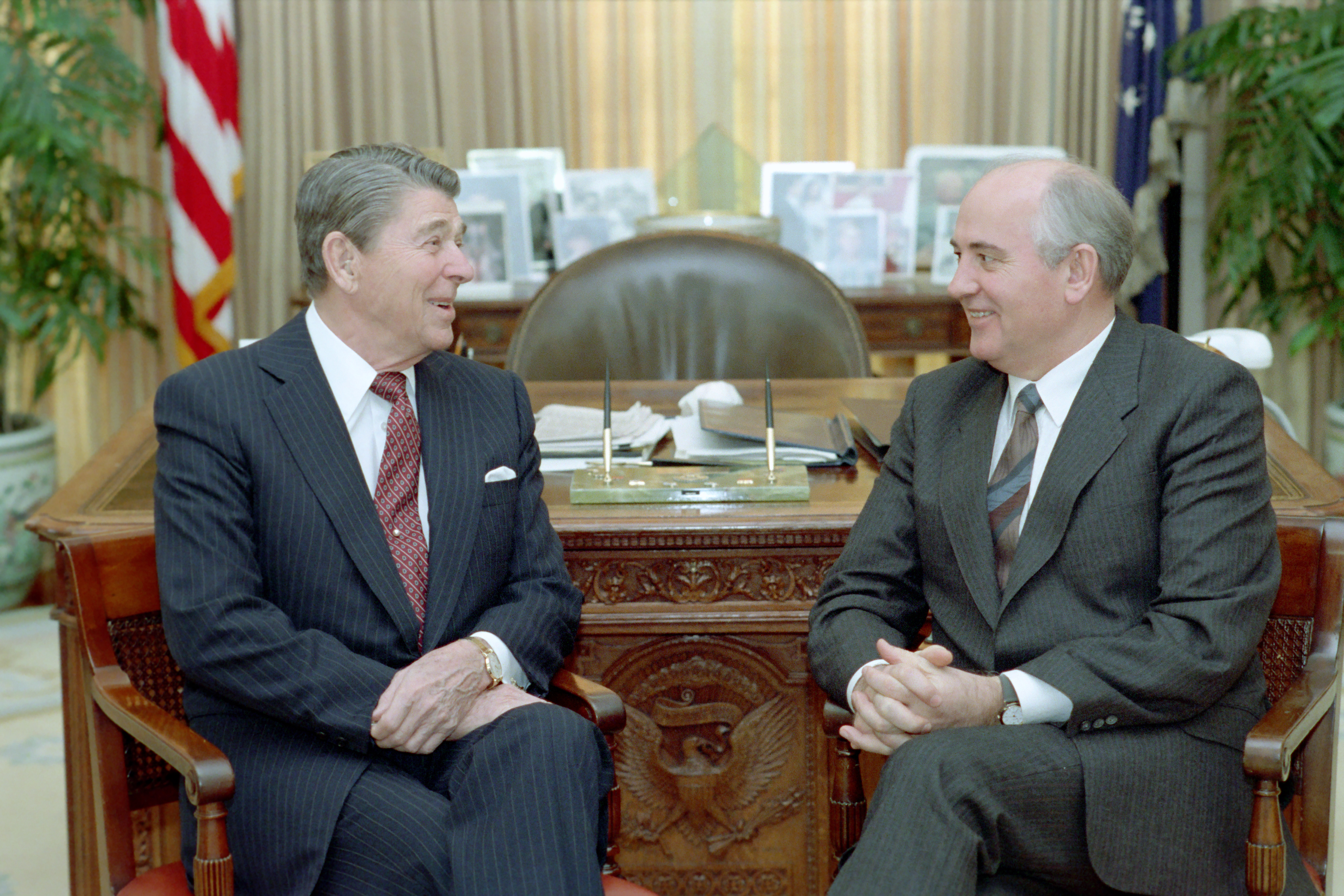
Reagan and Gorbachev, December 1987

In October 1977, the US, UK, and Soviet Union returned to negotiations over a test ban. These three nuclear powers made notable progress in the late 1970s, agreeing to terms on a ban on all testing, including a temporary prohibition on PNEs, but continued disagreements over the compliance mechanisms led to an end to negotiations ahead of Ronald Reagan's inauguration as president in 1981. In 1985, Soviet general secretary Mikhail Gorbachev announced a unilateral testing moratorium, and in December 1986, Reagan reaffirmed US commitment to pursue the long-term goal of a comprehensive test ban. In February 1987, the Soviets ended their test moratorium as the US had not reciprocated. In November 1987, negotiations on a test ban restarted, followed by a joint US-Soviet program to research underground-test detection in December 1987.

Partially pressured by the protests causing the shutdown of the Semipalatinsk Test Site, in October 1991, the Soviet Union announced another unilateral testing moratorium. Three days before its expiration, George H. W. Bush signed into law a reciprocal testing moratorium. President Bill Clinton later repeatedly extended this until the 1996 Treaty signature opening.

The Treaty was adopted by the United Nations General Assembly on 10 September 1996. It opened for signature in New York on 24 September 1996. The United States was the first nation to sign the treaty. Ratification by the US Senate was delayed by almost three years. On 13 October 1999, the resolution to ratify the CTBT, including an amendment of six safeguards, was defeated by a 51-48 vote, mostly along party lines. Unlike previous nuclear treaties, which had weeks of committee hearings and days of floor consideration, the CTBT received zero committee hearing and 18 hours of floor consideration. It was the first security-related treaty to be rejected by the Senate since the Treaty of Versailles, 80 years prior.

In the aftermath, and leadup to the 2000 United States presidential election, Republican candidates such as George W. Bush and John McCain voiced their opposition to the CTBT, but support for the testing moratorium. Following Bush's election victory, there was speculation testing would resume, pointing to the CTBT's "supreme national interest" provision where nations may withdraw if they feel their security is threatened by deteriorating warheads.

In October 2023, amid the context of the Russo-Ukrainian war (2022–present), Russian president Vladimir Putin stated that since the United States had not ratified the CTBT, consideration could be given to withdrawing Russia's ratification of the treaty. Later in the month, a law revoking ratification of the CTBT was passed by the Russian parliament. On 2 November, Putin officially signed into law the withdrawal of ratification of the treaty.

== Negotiations ==
Given the political situation prevailing in the subsequent decades, little progress was made in nuclear disarmament until the end of the Cold War in 1991. Parties to the PTBT held an amendment conference that year to discuss a proposal to convert the Treaty into an instrument banning all nuclear-weapon tests. With strong support from the UN General Assembly, negotiations for a comprehensive test-ban treaty began in 1993.

=== Adoption ===
Extensive efforts were made over the next three years to draft the Treaty text and its two annexes. However, the Conference on Disarmament, in which negotiations were being held, did not succeed in reaching consensus on the adoption of the text. Under the direction of Prime Minister John Howard and Foreign Minister Alexander Downer, Australia then sent the text to the United Nations General Assembly in New York, where it was submitted as a draft resolution. On 10 September 1996, the Comprehensive Test-Ban Treaty (CTBT) was adopted by a large majority, exceeding two-thirds of the General Assembly's Membership.

=== Obligations ===
(Article I):

1. Each State Party undertakes not to carry out any nuclear weapon test explosion or any other nuclear explosion, and to prohibit and prevent any such nuclear explosion at any place under its jurisdiction or control.
2. Each State Party undertakes, furthermore, to refrain from causing, encouraging, or in any way participating in the carrying out of any nuclear weapon test explosion or any other nuclear explosion.

== Status ==
The Treaty was adopted by the United Nations General Assembly on 10 September 1996. It opened for signature in New York on 24 September 1996, when it was signed by 71 states, including five of the eight then nuclear-capable states. As of July 2026, 179 states have ratified the CTBT and another nine states have signed but not ratified it.

The treaty will enter into force 180 days after the 44 states listed in Annex 2 of the treaty have ratified it. These "Annex 2 states" are states that participated in the CTBT's negotiations between 1994 and 1996 and possessed nuclear power reactors or research reactors at that time. As of 2023, nine Annex 2 states have not ratified the treaty: China, Egypt, Iran, Israel and the United States have signed but not ratified the Treaty; India, North Korea and Pakistan have not signed it; while Russia signed and ratified the treaty but subsequently withdrew its ratification prior to its entry into force.

== Monitoring ==
Geophysical and other technologies are used to monitor for compliance with the Treaty: forensic seismology, hydroacoustics, infrasound, and radionuclide monitoring. The first three forms of monitoring are known as wave-form measurements. Seismic monitoring is performed with a system of 50 primary stations located throughout the world, with 120 auxiliary stations in signatory states. Hydroacoustic monitoring is performed with a system of 11 stations that consist of hydrophone triads to monitor for underwater explosions. Hydroacoustic stations can use seismometers to measure T-waves from possible underwater explosions instead of hydrophones. The best measurement of hydroacoustic waves has been found to be at a depth of 1000 m. Infrasound monitoring relies on changes in atmospheric pressure caused by a possible nuclear explosion, with 41 stations certified as of August 2019. One of the biggest concerns with infrasound measurements is noise due to exposure from wind, which can affect the sensor's ability to measure if an event occurred. Together, these technologies are used to monitor the ground, water, and atmosphere for any sign of a nuclear explosion.

Radionuclide monitoring takes the form of either monitoring for radioactive particulates or noble gases as a product of a nuclear explosion. Radioactive particles emit radiation that can be measured by any of the 80 stations located throughout the world. They are created from nuclear explosions that can collect onto the dust that is moved from the explosion. If a nuclear explosion took place underground, noble gas monitoring can be used to verify whether or not a possible nuclear explosion took place. Noble gas monitoring relies on measuring increases in radioactive xenon gas. Different isotopes of xenon include ^{131m}Xe, ^{133}Xe, ^{133m}Xe, and ^{135}Xe. All four monitoring methods make up the International Monitoring System (IMS). Statistical theories and methods are integral to CTBT monitoring providing confidence in verification analysis. Once the Treaty enters into force, on-site inspections will be conducted where concerns about compliance arise.

The Preparatory Commission for the Comprehensive Test Ban Treaty Organization (CTBTO), an international organization headquartered in Vienna, Austria, was created to build the verification framework, including establishment and provisional operation of the network of monitoring stations, the creation of an international data centre (IDC), and development of the on-site Inspection capability. The CTBTO is responsible for collecting information from the IMS and distribute the analyzed and raw data to member states to judge whether or not a nuclear explosion occurred through the IDC. Parameters such as determining the location where a nuclear explosion or test took place is one of the things that the IDC can accomplish. If a member state chooses to assert that another state had violated the CTBT, they can request an on-site inspection to take place to verify.

The monitoring network consists of 337 facilities located all over the globe. As of May 2012, more than 260 facilities have been certified. The monitoring stations register data that is transmitted to the international data centre in Vienna for processing and analysis. The data are sent to states that have signed the Treaty.

== Possible violations ==
=== Fission yields ===
In 2020, the United States alleged that Russia had, between 1996 and 2019, carried out an unspecified number of low-yield nuclear tests in underground facilities. It also alleged that China's 2019 expansion of the Lop Nur test site would allow similar secret testing.

Extremely small fission yields are created during some Z Pulsed Power Facility and the National Ignition Facility experiments (see below).

=== Inertial confinement fusion ===
==== Laser-driven ====
There is a question surrounding whether the experiments of inertial confinement fusion facilities around the world, which initiate thermonuclear fusion in small deuterium-tritium pellets, qualify under the Treaty's total ban on the undertaking of all "nuclear explosions". John Nuckolls, the Livermore scientist credited as one of the pioneers of the field of ICF, himself described the fusion of less than one milligram of deuterium-tritium as an "explosion".

The American National Ignition Facility, the French Laser Mégajoule, and the Russian ISKRA-5, all have a dual-use, supporting scientific research for both peaceful purposes, and for the continual verification and maintenance of their countries' thermonuclear weapon stockpile.

In the 1990s, the Treaty, and especially the "zero-yield" non-criticality standard for weapons-related fission testing, was the impetus for the American Stockpile Stewardship and Management Program. Under this program, computational and experimental fusion research facilities were funded for weapon verification, including the magnetic confinement Z Pulsed Power Facility, and the inertial laser implosion OMEGA laser and the 1997 National Ignition Facility. In 1999 the US Department of Energy, in response to concern from Senator Tom Harkin, stated "NIF experiments are not considered nuclear explosions" and that "the large size of the facilities required to achieve inertial confinement fusion rules out weaponization". In 1998, Princeton policy researchers published "The question of pure fusion explosions under the CTBT". They sought a ban on testing above 10^{14} neutrons, and on the use of tritium, which enhances the yield approximately twenty-fold versus deuterium-deuterium reactions, and forms the majority of the fusion yield in boosted and thermonuclear weapons. These were not adopted, and fusion yield has increased 11,000 times since then.

In 2022, the NIF achieved 3.15 MJ and for the first time an energy gain greater than one, equivalent to the chemical explosion of 752 grams of TNT, or three sticks of dynamite, and on a timescale of nanoseconds instead of a chemical explosive's milliseconds. This led to increased concern over the status of such experiments under the Treaty, and the development of pure fusion weapons.

==== Non-laser-driven ====
In 1992, Russian scientists used high-explosive implosions to trigger fusion in less than a nanogram of deuterium-tritium gas, releasing 10^{14} neutrons and the energy equivalent of 60 milligrams of TNT. Experiments on fusion in hypervelocity projectiles dates back to 1980. This approach has been demonstrated commercially by the startup company First Light Fusion. The Z Pulsed Power Facility has carried out pulsed plasma compression experiments using electrical current and magnetic fields.

== Subsequent non-signatory nuclear tests ==
Three countries have tested nuclear weapons since the CTBT opened for signature in 1996, India, Pakistan, and North Korea, all non-signatories. India and Pakistan both carried out two sets of tests in 1998. North Korea carried out six announced tests, one each in 2006, 2009, 2013, two in 2016 and one in 2017. All six North Korean tests were picked up by the International Monitoring System set up by the Comprehensive Nuclear-Test-Ban Treaty Organization Preparatory Commission. A North Korean test is believed to have taken place in January 2016, evidenced by an "artificial earthquake" measured as a magnitude 5.1 by the U.S. Geological Survey. The first successful North Korean hydrogen bomb test supposedly took place in September 2017. It was estimated to have an explosive yield of 120 kilotons.

== See also ==
- International Day for the Total Elimination of Nuclear Weapons
- List of weapons of mass destruction treaties
- Comprehensive Nuclear-Test-Ban Treaty Organization
- Comprehensive Nuclear-Test-Ban Treaty Organization Preparatory Commission
- National technical means of verification
- Nuclear disarmament
- Nuclear-free zone
- Partial Nuclear Test Ban Treaty
- Treaty on the Non-Proliferation of Nuclear Weapons
- Treaty on the Prohibition of Nuclear Weapons

== Sources ==
- Ambrose, Stephen E. (1991). Eisenhower: Soldier and President. New York: Simon & Schuster. ISBN 978-0671747589.
- Burns, Richard Dean; Siracusa, Joseph M. (2013). A Global History of the Nuclear Arms Race: Weapons, Strategy, and Politics – Volume 1. Santa Barbara, CA: ABC-CLIO. ISBN 978-1440800955.
- Evangelista, Matthew (1999). Unarmed Forces: The Transnational Movement to End the Cold War. Ithaca, NY: Cornell University Press. ISBN 978-0801487842.
- Polsby, Nelson W. (1984). Political Innovation in America: The Politics of Policy Initiation. New Haven, CT: Yale University Press. ISBN 978-0300034288.
- Strode, Rebecca (1990). "Soviet Policy Toward a Nuclear Test Ban: 1958–1963". In Mandelbaum, Michael (ed.). The Other Side of the Table: The Soviet Approach to Arms Control. New York and London: Council on Foreign Relations Press. ISBN 978-0876090718.
- Reeves, Richard (1993). President Kennedy: Profile of Power. New York: Simon & Schuster. p. 5. ISBN 978-0671892890.
- Rhodes, Richard (2005). Dark Sun: The Making of the Hydrogen Bomb. New York: Simon & Schuster. ISBN 978-0684824147.
- Rhodes, Richard (2008). Arsenals of Folly: The Making of the Nuclear Arms Race. New York: Vintage. ISBN 978-0375713941.
- Schlesinger, Arthur Meier Jr. (2002). A Thousand Days: John F. Kennedy in the White House. New York: Houghton Mifflin. ISBN 978-0618219278.
- Seaborg, Glenn T. (1981). Kennedy, Khrushchev, and the Test Ban. Berkeley and Los Angeles: University of California Press. ISBN 978-0520049611.
