= People's Movement for Progress =

Political party in Burkina Faso

People's Movement for Progress Mouvement du Peuple pour le Progrès
- Abbreviation: MPP
- Leader: Roch Marc Christian Kaboré (detained under house arrest since January 2022)
- President: Alassane Bala Sakandé
- Founded: 25 January 2014
- Dissolved: 29 January 2026
- Split from: Congress for Democracy and Progress
- Ideology: Social democracy Progressivism
- Political position: Centre-left
- International affiliation: Progressive Alliance; Socialist International

Website
- mpp-burkina.org

The People's Movement for Progress (French: Mouvement du Peuple pour le Progrès, MPP) was a political party in Burkina Faso that was founded on 25 January 2014 by former Congress for Democracy and Progress member Roch Marc Christian Kaboré. Kaboré ran as the party's presidential candidate in the 2015 general election and was elected in the first round of voting; the MPP also won a plurality of seats in the National Assembly. It is a full member of the Progressive Alliance and Socialist International. On 24 January 2022, Kaboré was deposed as Burkina Faso President and arrested following a military coup. On 29 January 2026, all parties, including this one, were dissolved through decree by the junta government in Burkina Faso.

== Electoral history ==
=== Presidential elections ===
Election	Party candidate	Votes	%	Result
2015	Roch Marc Christian Kaboré	1,668,169	53.49%	Elected ✓
2020	Roch Marc Christian Kaboré	1,645,229	57.74%	Elected ✓

=== National Assembly elections ===
Election	Party leader	Votes	%	Seats	+/–	Position	Outcome
2015	Roch Marc Christian Kaboré	1,096,814	34.71%	55 / 127	▲55	▲1st	Minority government
2020	Roch Marc Christian Kaboré	968,980	34.59%	56 / 127	▲1	1st	Minority government
