= 2018 North Korea–United States Singapore Summit =

Meeting between Donald Trump and Kim Jong Un

Coordinates: 01°14′58″N 103°49′28″E

2018 North Korea–United States Singapore Summit Singapore Summit
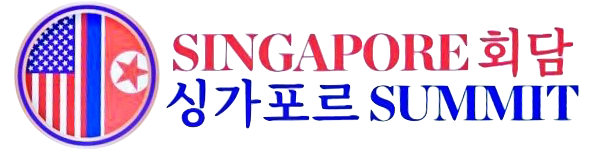
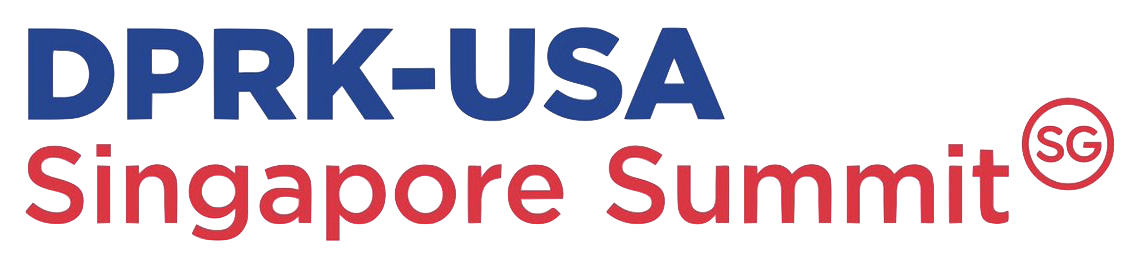
- Logo used by the United States Logo used by Singapore

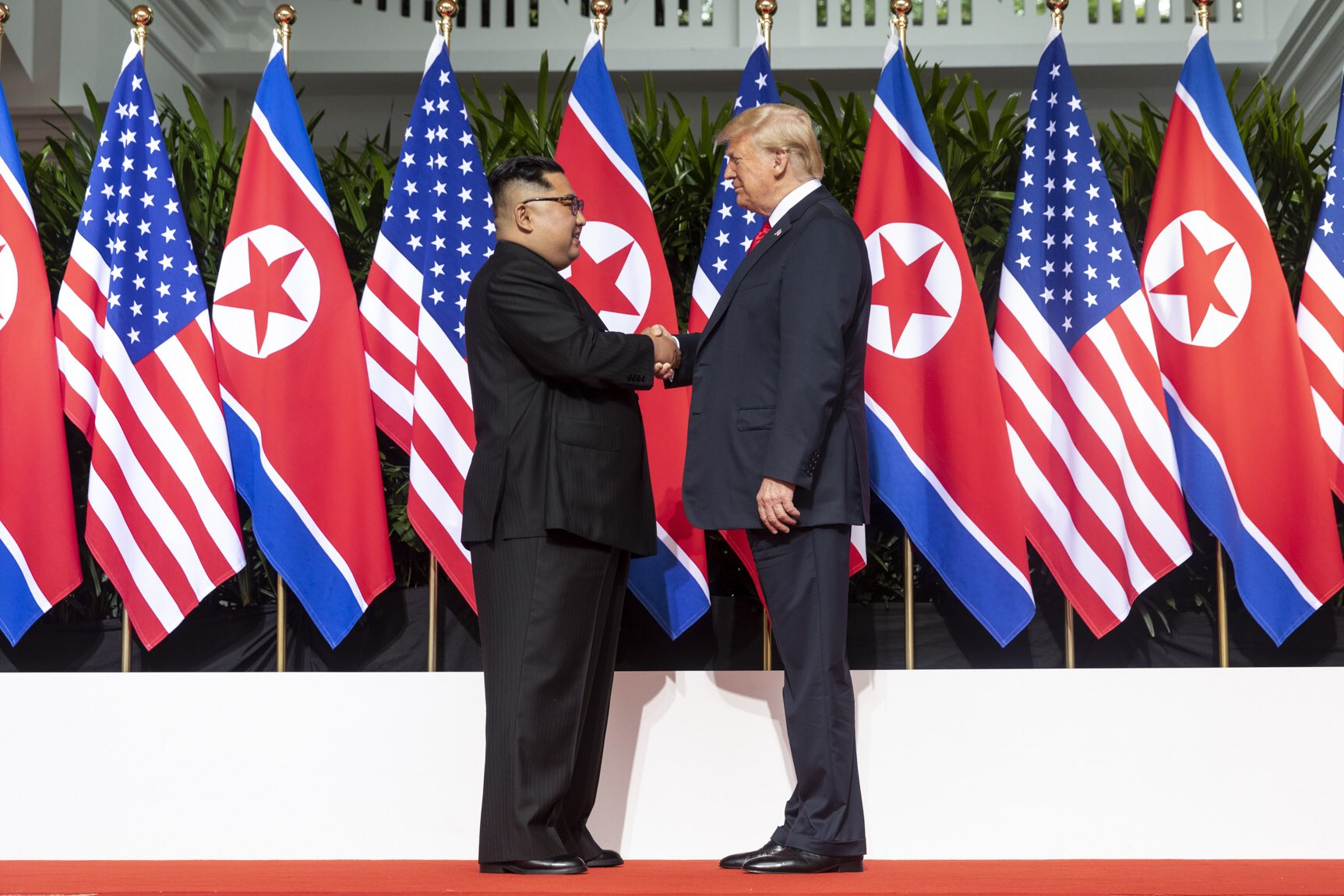
- Kim Jong Un and Donald Trump shaking hands at the start of the summit
- Host country: Singapore
- Date: 12 June 2018; 09:00 SGT (01:00 UTC)
- Venues: Capella Resort, Sentosa
- Participants: (United States) Donald Trump (North Korea) Kim Jong Un
- Precedes: 2019 North Korea–United States Hanoi Summit

2018 North Korea–United States Singapore Summit

North Korean name
- Chosŏn'gŭl: 제1차 조미수뇌회담
- Hancha: 第1次 朝米首腦會談
Transcriptions
- Revised Romanization: Je-ilcha Jomi sunoehoedam
- McCune–Reischauer: Che-ilch'a Chomi sunoehoedam

South Korean name
- Hangul: 북미 정상회담
- Hanja: 北美 頂上會談
Transcriptions
- Revised Romanization: Bungmi jeongsanghoedam
- McCune–Reischauer: Pungmi jŏngsanghoedam

The 2018 North Korea–United States Singapore Summit, commonly known as the Singapore Summit, was a summit meeting between North Korean leader Kim Jong Un and U.S. president Donald Trump, held at the Capella Hotel, Sentosa, Singapore, on June 12, 2018. It was the first-ever meeting between leaders of North Korea and the United States.

After a period of heightened conflict that included North Korea successfully testing what it claimed was its first hydrogen bomb and the Hwasong-15 intercontinental ballistic missile (ICBM) in late 2017, tensions began to de-escalate after Kim Jong Un announced his desire to send athletes to the 2018 Winter Olympics being held in South Korea. During the games, Kim proposed talks with South Korea to plan an inter-Korean summit. On March 8, the South Korean delegation returned from the talks and traveled to the United States to deliver an invitation by Kim Jong Un to Donald Trump for a meeting. High-level exchanges between the two sides then took place, including a visit by then–CIA director Mike Pompeo to Pyongyang and a visit by Kim Yong-chol, Vice Chairman of the Workers' Party of Korea, to the White House. Both sides threatened to cancel the summit after a round of joint military exercises by the U.S. and South Korea, with Trump even delivering a formal letter to Kim to call off the meeting; however, the two sides eventually agreed to meet.

Trump and Kim signed a joint statement, agreeing to security guarantees for North Korea, new peaceful relations, the denuclearization of the Korean Peninsula, recovery of soldiers' remains, and follow-up negotiations between high-level officials. Both leaders also met separately with then Singaporean prime minister Lee Hsien Loong. Immediately following the summit, Trump announced that the U.S. military would discontinue "provocative" joint military exercises with South Korea, and stated that he wished to bring the U.S. soldiers back home at some point, but reinforced that it was not part of the Singapore equation. A second meeting was held between Trump and Kim in February 2019 in Hanoi, Vietnam.

== Background ==
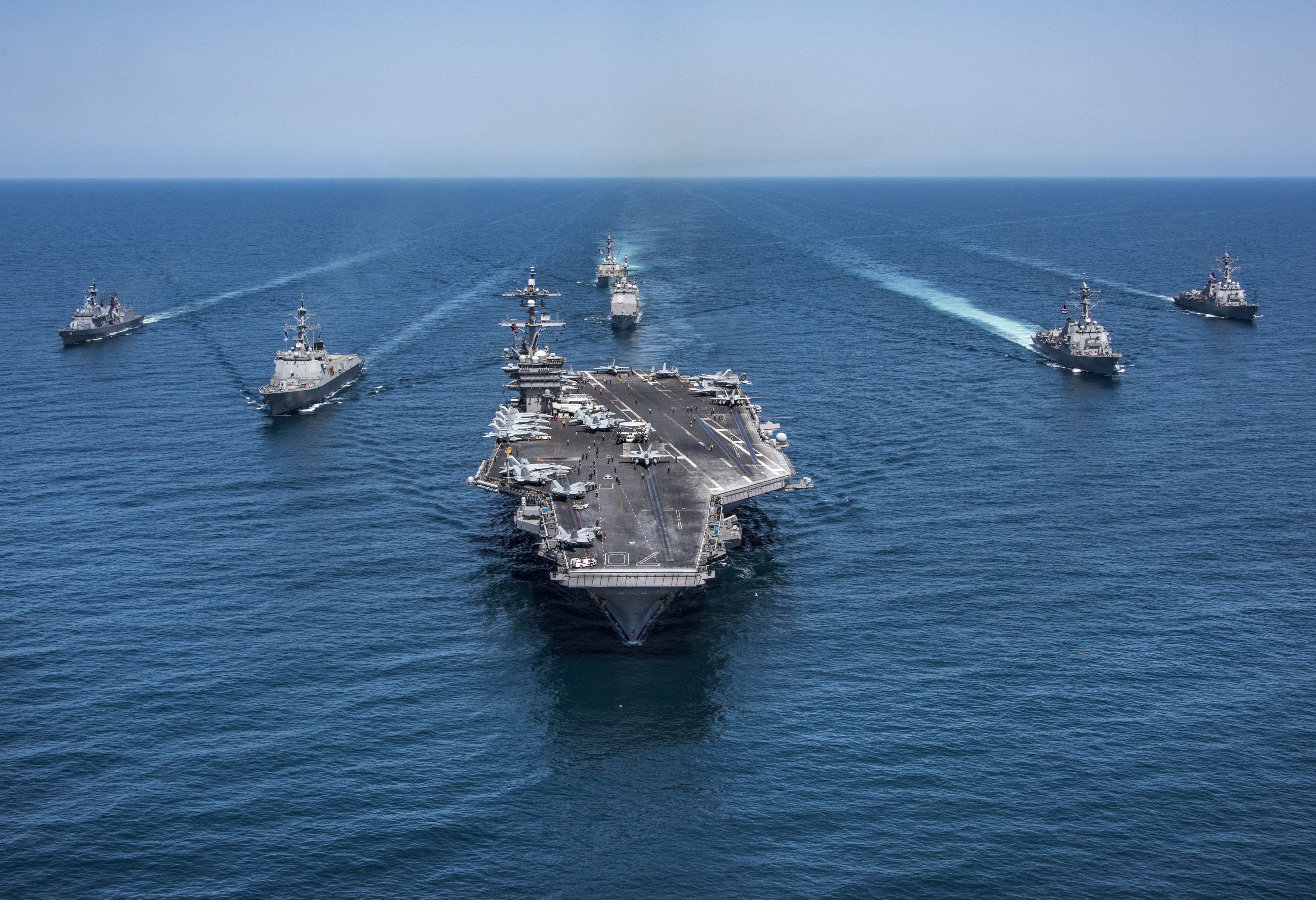
USS Carl Vinson carrier strike group and South Korean Navy vessels having a joint exercise on May 3, 2017

The Koreas have been divided since 1945. The Korean War of 1950–1953 ended with an armistice agreement but not a peace settlement. A sporadic conflict has continued with American troops remaining in the South as part of a mutual defense treaty. The North began building a nuclear reactor in 1963, and it began a nuclear weapons program in the 1980s. North Korea first committed to denuclearization in 1992 in the Joint Declaration of the Denuclearization of the Korean Peninsula. In a speech authored by David Frum, President George W. Bush referred to North Korea as part of an "axis of evil" during his 2002 State of the Union address, but in the 2005 Joint Statement of the Fourth Round of the Six-Party Talks, North Korea reaffirmed the 1992 Joint Declaration and the goal of verifiable denuclearization of the Korean Peninsula. In 2008, North Korea voluntarily gave information on its nuclear program in exchange for sanction relief, and they were taken off the State Sponsors of Terrorism list. Despite this, nuclear inspectors were barred from surveying any North Korean weapons facilities. The Obama administration had a policy of "strategic patience", in which perceived North Korean provocations would not be "rewarded" with presidential attention or the sending of high-level envoys but instead be punished with sanctions and greater military coordination with South Korea and Japan. More nuclear tests were conducted in the succeeding years, and the 2010 bombardment of Yeonpyeong markedly raised tensions between North Korea and South Korea. The escalation of North Korea's nuclear program advanced particularly under the rule of Kim Jong Un, who became the leader in December 2011, after his father Kim Jong Il died.

Donald Trump was elected US president in 2016 with a position of opposition to Barack Obama's policy of "strategic patience" towards North Korea. While advocating a tough stance, he also expressed openness to dialogue, saying he would be prepared to "eat a hamburger" with Kim. He put himself at odds with military allies, saying that it would be better if South Korea and Japan protect themselves. In return, a pro-North Korean website, DPRK Today, described him as a "wise politician". The editorial suggested that Trump might make the slogan "Yankee go home" a reality. In 2017, Moon Jae-in was elected President of South Korea with a promise to return to the Sunshine Policy of friendly relations with the North.

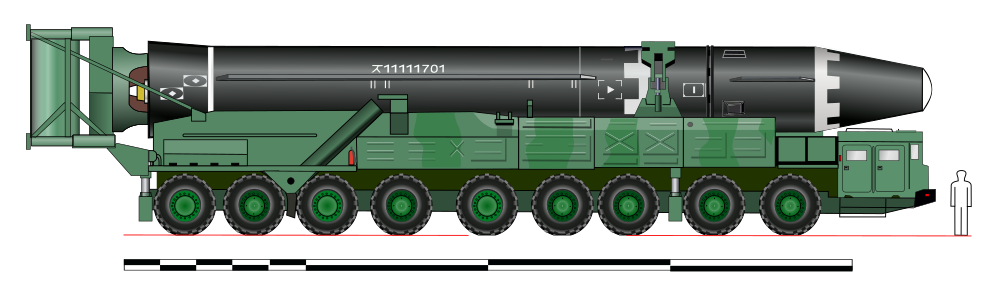
Artist's conception of the Hwasong-15 on its mobile launch vehicle, depicted to scale

During a period of heightened tensions with the United States, North Korea successfully tested its first intercontinental ballistic missile (ICBM), named Hwasong-14, in July 2017. In response to heightened North Korean rhetoric, Trump warned that any North Korean attack "will be met with fire, fury and frankly, power, the likes of which the world has never seen before". In response, North Korea announced that it was considering a missile test in which the missiles would land near the US territory of Guam. North Korea tested what some sources argued may have been its first hydrogen bomb on September 3. The test was internationally condemned, and further economic sanctions were put on North Korea. The United States also added North Korea back to its State Sponsors of Terrorism list after nine years. On November 28, North Korea launched the Hwasong-15, which, according to analysts, would be capable of reaching anywhere in the United States. The United Nations responded by placing further sanctions on the country. After North Korea claimed that the missile was capable of "carrying [a] super-heavy [nuclear] warhead and hitting the whole mainland of the U.S.", Kim Jong Un announced that they had "finally realized the great historic cause of completing the state nuclear force", putting them in a position of strength to push the United States into talks.

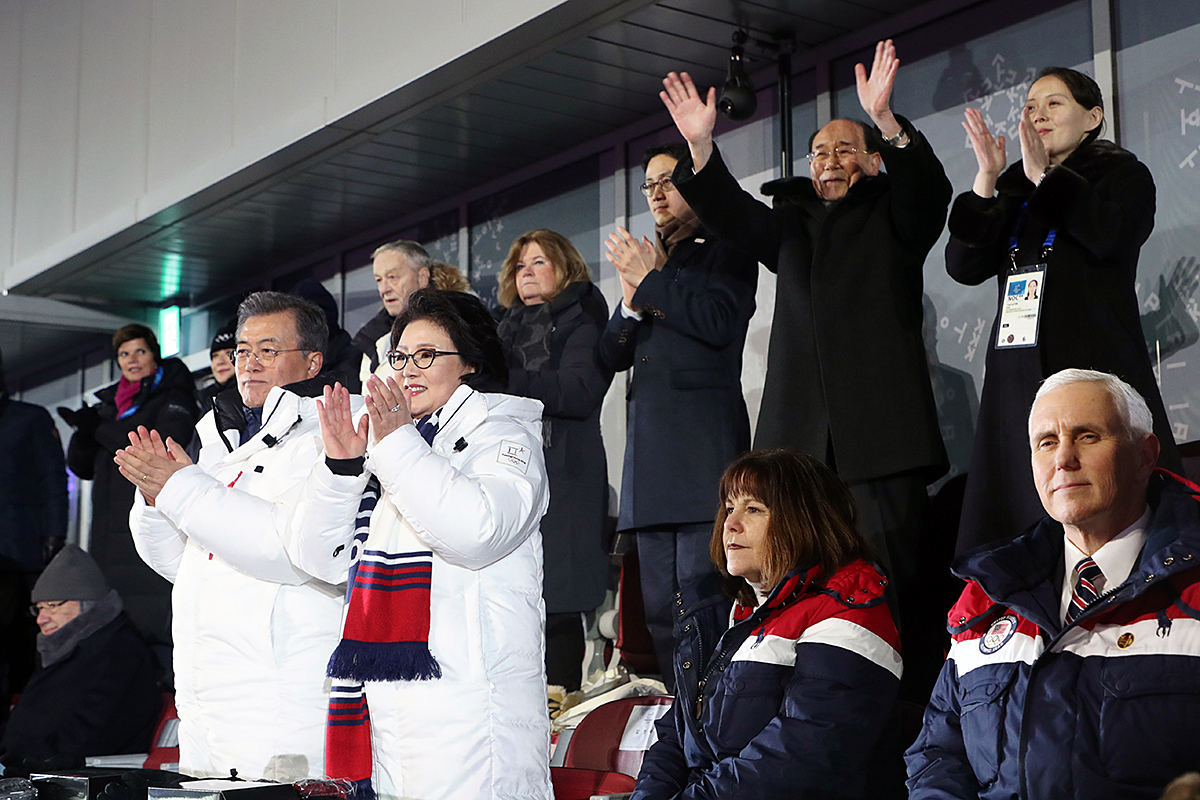
Moon Jae-in (standing, lower left) with the North Korean representatives (upper right) and U.S. Vice President Mike Pence (lower right) at the PyeongChang Olympics

In his New Year address of 2018, North Korean chairman Kim Jong Un celebrated completing the countries' nuclear capabilities and proposed talks for sending a delegation to the upcoming Winter Olympics in South Korea. In January a false missile alert alarmed Hawaii. The Seoul–Pyongyang hotline was reopened after almost two years. North Korea sent an unprecedentedly high-authority delegation, headed by Kim Yo-jong, sister of Kim Jong Un, and Chairman of the Presidium of the Supreme People's Assembly Kim Yong-nam, and including performers like the Samjiyon Orchestra. The delegation passed on an invitation to President Moon to visit North Korea. The United States was represented by Vice President Mike Pence. After arriving late to a dinner hosted by President Moon, he was asked to greet the other dignitaries, but he shook hands with everyone except Kim Yong-nam and left early. North and South Korean athletes marched together in the Olympics opening ceremony and fielded a united women's ice hockey team.

== Announcement ==
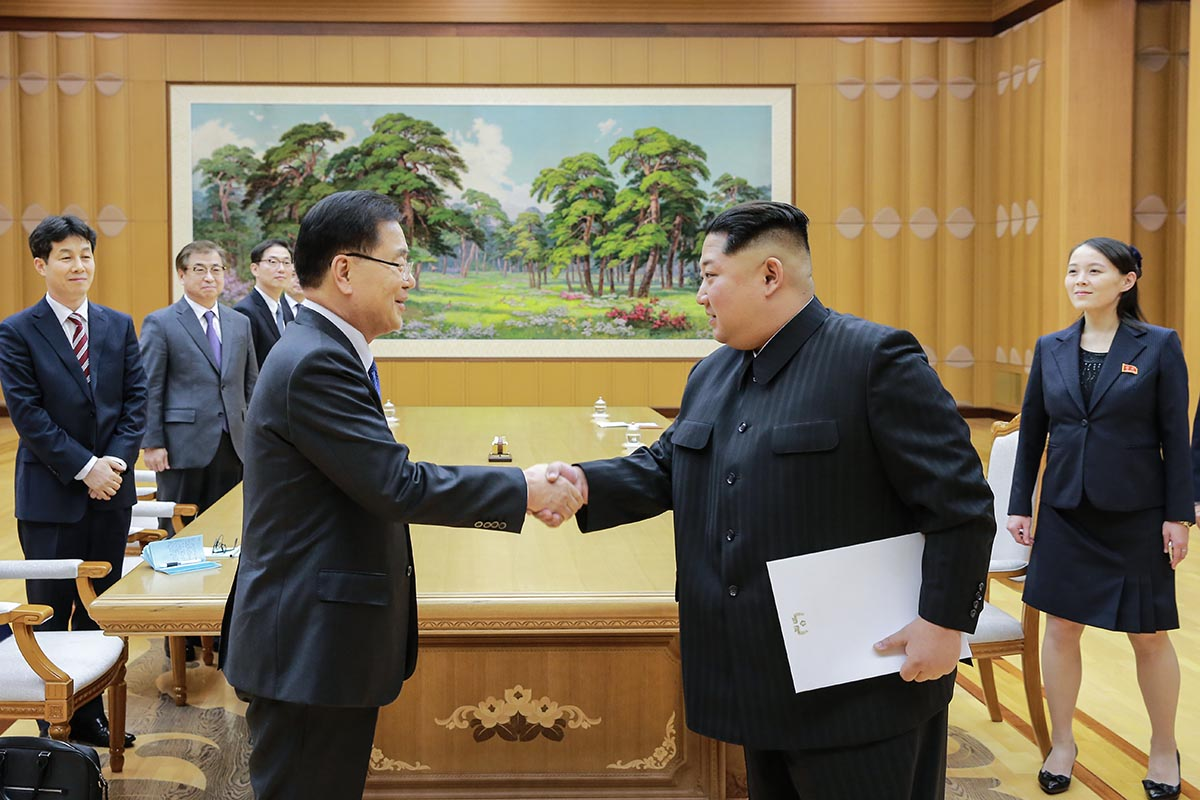
Chung Eui-yong (left), the South Korean national security chief, and Kim Jong-un meeting in Pyongyang on March 5, 2018. Kim is holding a letter from President Moon Jae-in arranging for direct peace talks.

On March 5, 2018, South Korea's special delegation agreed to hold the third inter-Korean summit at Inter-Korean Peace House in Panmunjom on April 27, 2018. On March 6, after returning to South Korea, the national security adviser, Chung Eui-yong, and National Information Director Suh Hoon traveled to the United States on March 8 to report to Trump about the upcoming inter-Korean summit and relayed to President Trump the North Korean chairman Kim Jong Un's invitation. Trump endorsed the North Korea–United States summit about an hour after receiving the report. The South Korean National Security Adviser (SKNS), Mr. Jeong briefed the public that the North Korea–United States summit would be held sometime in May 2018.

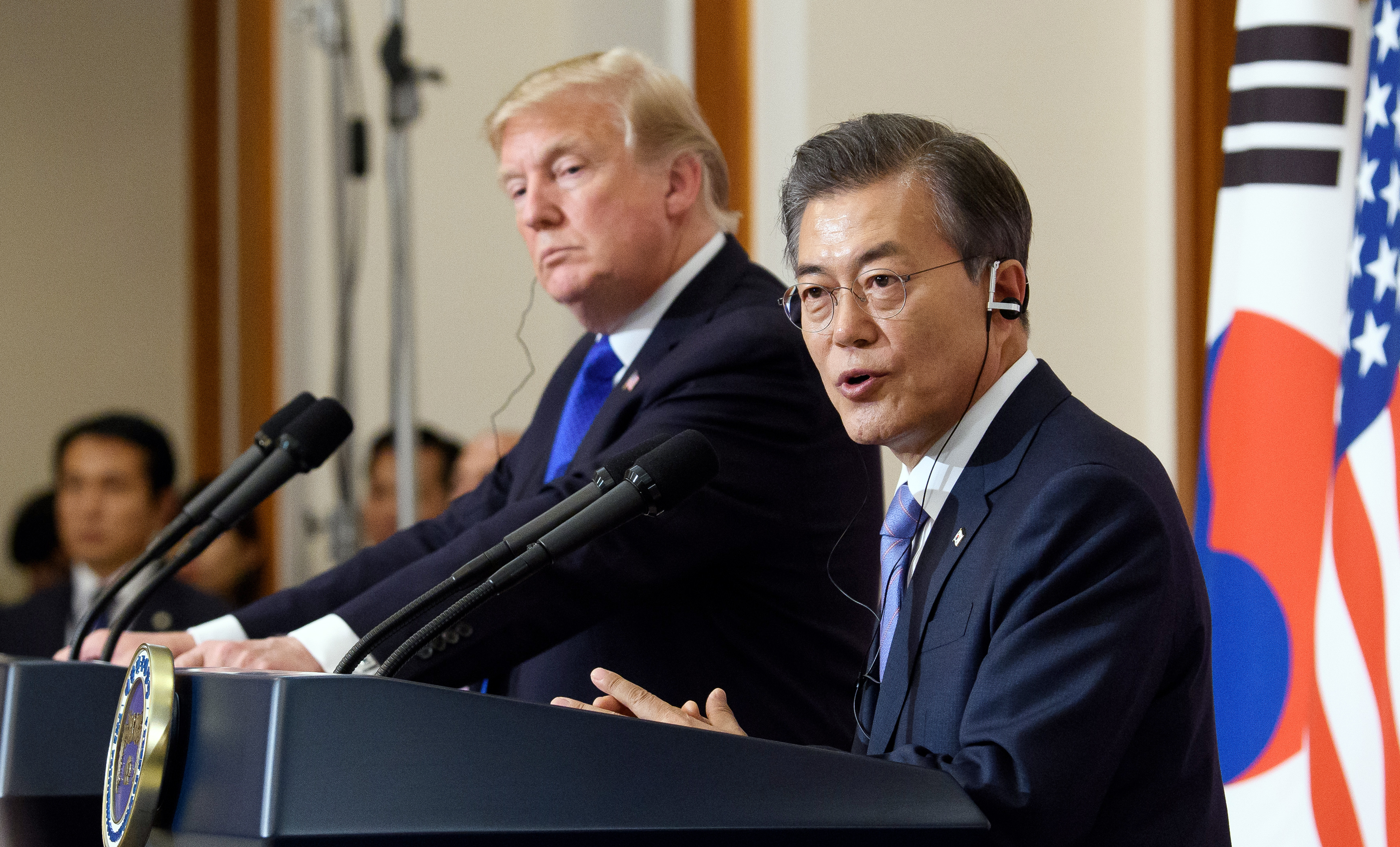
ROK President Moon Jae-in and US President Donald Trump, November 2017

The White House announced that the UN Sanctions would remain in place until an agreement between the United States and North Korea is reached. On March 6, Sarah Sanders said that the White House would need to see "concrete and verifiable steps" toward the denuclearization of North Korea before Trump would meet with Kim Jong Un. Later that day, an unidentified Trump official told The Wall Street Journal that Trump had still accepted Kim Jong Un's invitation.

South Korea's national security adviser Chung Eui-yong visited China on March 12 to meet with the Chinese leader, Xi Jinping, of the foreign officials and report on the planned inter-Korean summit as well as the North Korea-United States summit and asked their advice. Russia on March 14, 2018, for explaining North Korea and the United States Visit Summary, seeking guidance for upcoming 2018 inter-Korean summit. National Information Director Suh Hoon visited Japan and had a consultation with Prime Minister Shinzo Abe including the foreign officials about the denuclearization and Permanent Peace on the Korean Peninsula.

== Preparations ==
=== Preparatory talks ===
According to reporting by The New York Times, American investor Gabriel Schulze conveyed an approach from North Korean officials seeking to establish a back channel to Jared Kushner in 2017. Kushner referred the outreach to the Central Intelligence Agency, which subsequently took the lead in discussions with North Korean officials. Schulze’s early contacts were described as one of several steps that helped set in motion the diplomacy leading to the summit.

South Korea's foreign ministry announced on March 18, 2018 that selected informal delegations from North Korea, South Korea, and the US would meet for denuclearization discussions in April in Vantaa, Finland. (This type of discussions, as held previously, had sometimes been referred to as track-2 talks.) According to South Korea's Yonhap News Agency, Choe Kang-il, a deputy director general for North American affairs at North Korea's foreign ministry, would also attend the event, which Yonhap termed "track-1.5 talks".

=== Kim Jong Un's meeting with Xi Jinping ===
North Korea's supreme leader Kim was in Beijing on March 25–28, 2018, arriving by special train for talks with China's paramount leader Xi Jinping, Kim's first known out-of-country excursion since taking power six years previously. China stated that North Korea was "committed to denuclearization" and willing to hold a summit with the United States. It was organized by the invitation of Xi. During the meeting between two leaders, Kim officially invited Xi to the North Korean capital Pyongyang when it was convenient in his schedule, and Xi accepted the invitation. Xi urged Kim to strengthen the strategic and diplomatic future partnership between China and North Korea. Kim stressed to Xi that North Korea and China are communist countries and that there are many ways to cooperate in various aspects in the future. Kim and Xi met again on May 7, 2018, in the city of Dalian, China.

=== Announcement within North Korea ===
According to North Korea's state media Korean Central News Agency (KCNA), Kim led a meeting of the ruling Workers' Party of Korea's political bureau on April 9, 2018, where he spoke about the planned summit with Trump for the first time.

=== Proposed conditions by North Korea ===
On April 11, North Korea presented five entreaties as conditions for the dismissal of their nuclear-capable ICBMs:

1. Ensuring the United States and South Korea do not locate nuclear weapons strategic assets within the vicinity of the Korean Peninsula
2. Ceasing development or operation of strategic nuclear assets during USFK–ROK combined military training
3. Ensuring the United States will not attack North Korea with conventional or nuclear weapons
4. Converting the 1953 Korean Armistice Agreement into a peace treaty on the Korean Peninsula
5. Establishing official diplomatic ties between North Korea and the United States.

Although North Korea was previously expected to request the withdrawal of United States Forces Korea (USFK) from South Korea, North Korea publicized they would embrace the continuous deployment of 25,000 USFK troops in South Korea as long as the security of North Korea is guaranteed.

=== April 2018 inter-Korean summit ===
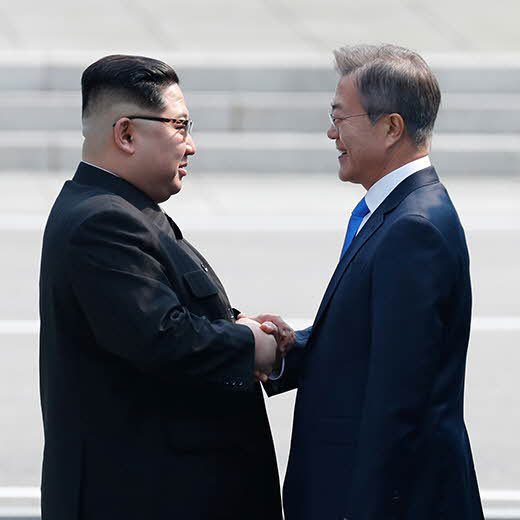
Kim and President of South Korea Moon Jae-in shake hands in greeting, in an initiating gesture for the April 2018 inter-Korean summit.

At an inter-Korean summit on April 27, 2018, held at the Peace House in Panmunjom, the leaders of North and South Korea agreed to formally end the Korean War before the end of the year and confirmed the goal of a nuclear-free Korean Peninsula through denuclearization.

=== Release of the American detainees ===
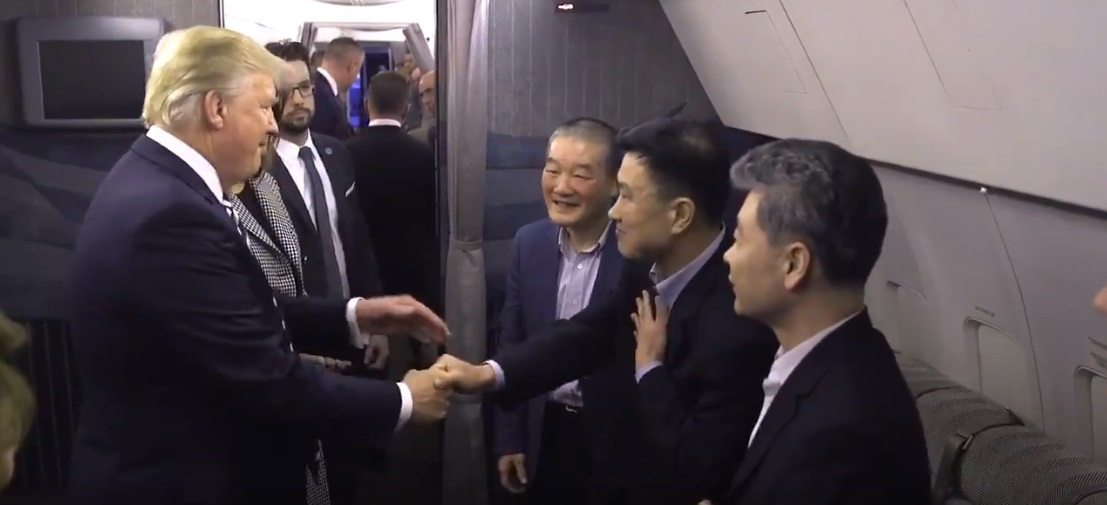
President Donald J. Trump and First Lady Melania Trump welcome home three American returnees from North Korea.

On May 10, 2018, three Americans held by North Korea were released following negotiations between the Trump administration and the North Korean regime. Some have speculated that their release was part of an attempt of the regime to motivate the US to continue the negotiations and perhaps ease the pressure upon the North Koreans. Nevertheless, their release has managed to ease the tensions between the Trump administration and the North Korean regime, enabling both sides to proceed to further negotiations, possibly leading to the 2018 North Korea–United States summit.

The three Americans Kim Dong Chul, Kim Sang-duk, and Kim Hak-song left North Korea accompanied by Secretary of State Mike Pompeo and were greeted by the president and the first lady upon their landing on US soil at Joint Base Andrews in Maryland.

=== Tensions, cancellation, and reinstatement ===
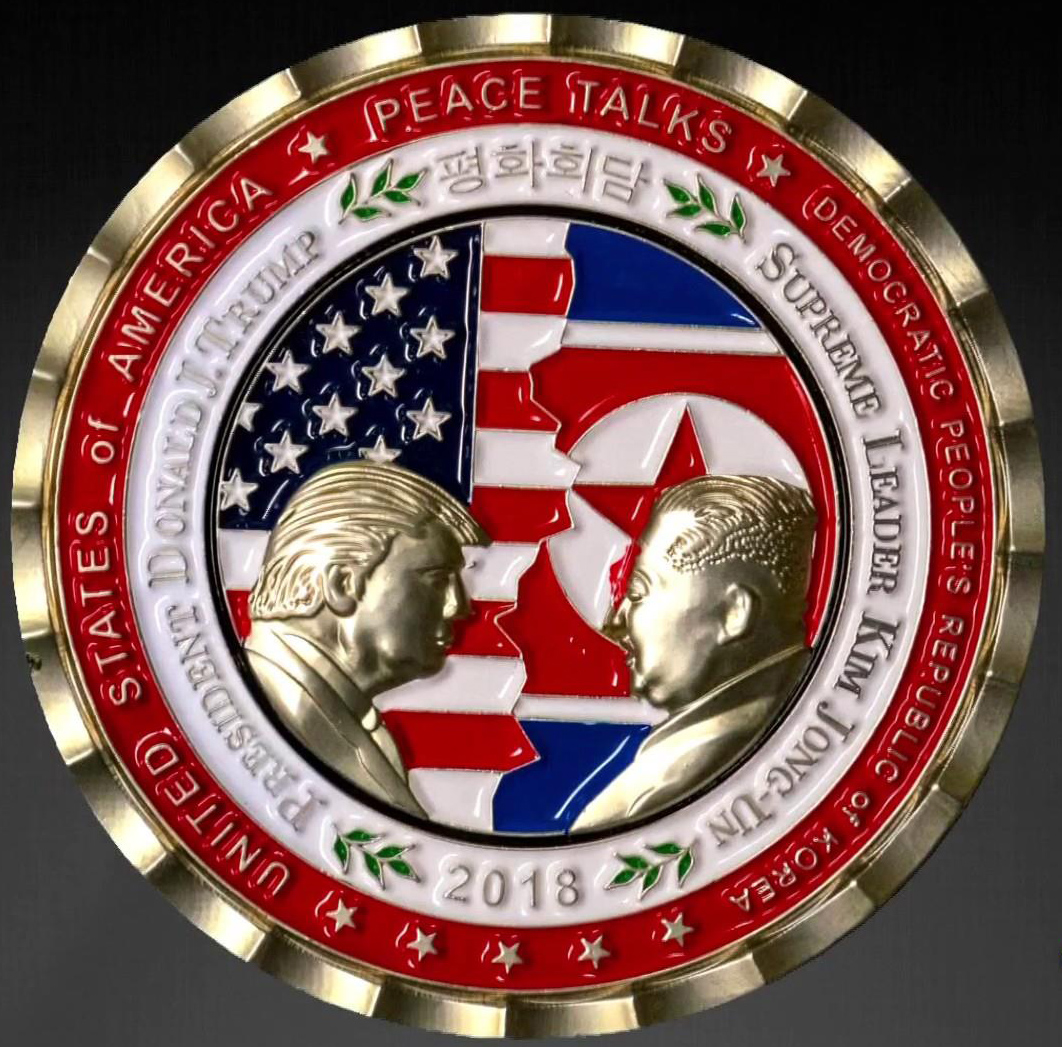
A commemorative coin released on May 21 by the White House Communications Agency for the summit

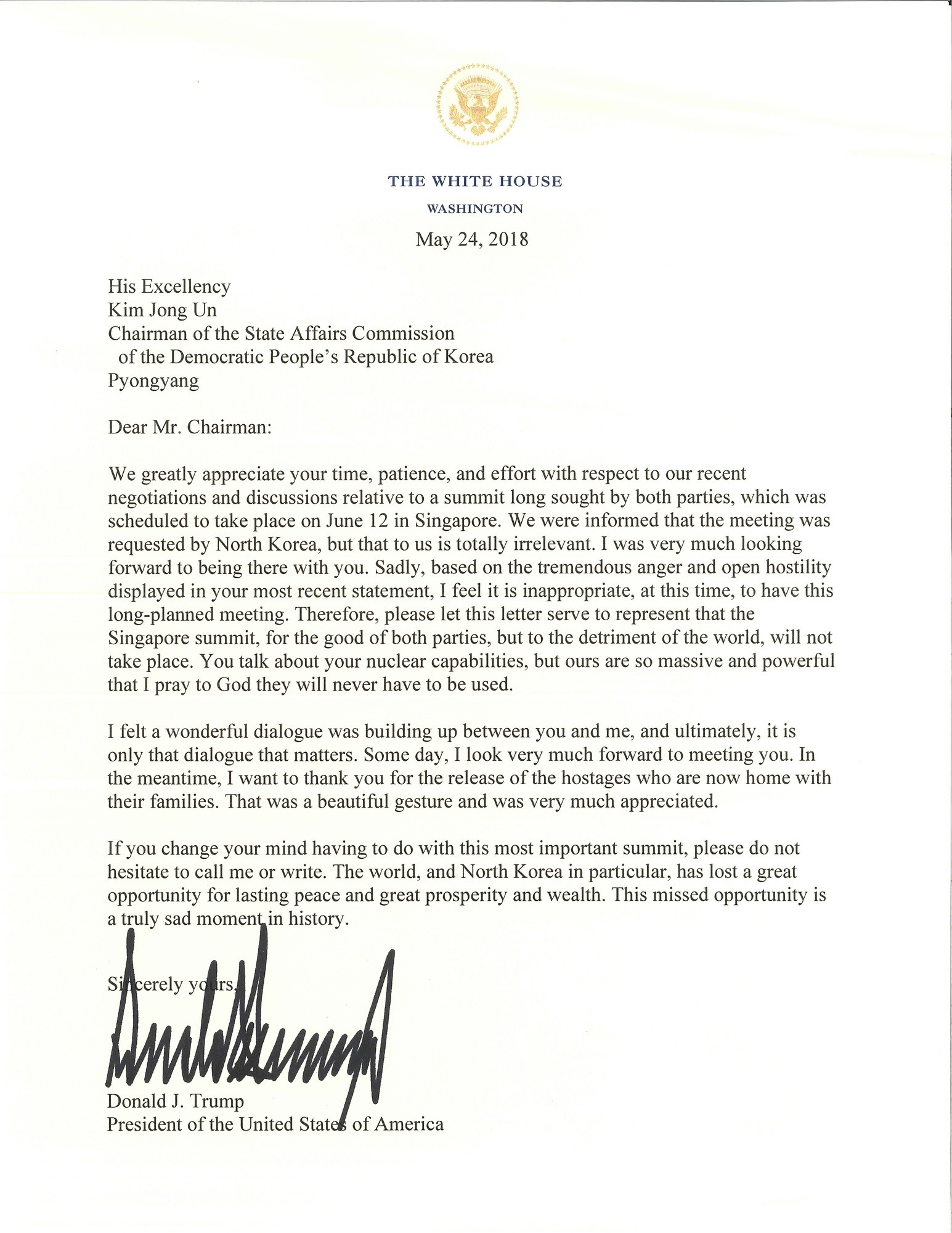
Letter sent to North Korean leader Kim Jong Un by US President Donald Trump informing Kim of the cancellation of the summit

American Vice President Mike Pence said on May 21, 2018, that "this will only end like the Libyan model ended if Kim Jong Un doesn't make a deal" to "dismantle his nuclear weapons program". Trump had made similar remarks on May 17, as he described that Libya's fate is "what will take place if we don't make a deal". These comments were in reference to the killing of Libyan leader Muammar Gaddafi after military intervention by Americans and Europeans in 2011. After a NATO airstrike prevented Gaddafi's escape, the Libyan rebels captured, assaulted, sodomized, and executed Gaddafi. However, Libya under Gaddafi had already in 2003 voluntarily ended its nuclear weapons program and complied with conditions set by Western powers. As a result, North Korean vice foreign minister Choe Son-hui called Pence's remarks "ignorant and stupid" and threatened a "nuclear-to-nuclear showdown".

Trump canceled the summit on May 24, 2018, via a letter to Chairman Kim, writing that "based on the tremendous anger and open hostility displayed in your most recent statement, I feel it is inappropriate, at this time, to have this long-planned meeting ... You talk about your nuclear capabilities, but ours are so massive and powerful that I pray to God they will never have to be used." Even though it was Trump who decided to cancel, Trump told Kim, "If you change your mind having to do with this most important summit, please do not hesitate to call me or write."

South Korean President Moon was left "very perplexed" by Trump's cancellation, while the South Korean minister in charge of inter-Korean affairs Cho Myoung-gyon said that North Korea "remains sincere" on "efforts on denuclearization and peace building".

In response to Trump's cancellation, North Korean vice foreign minister Kim Kye-gwan expressed his country's "willingness to sit down face-to-face with the US and resolve issues anytime and in any format", being "open-minded in giving time and opportunity to the US" for the "peace and stability for the world and the Korean Peninsula". Trump's cancellation had come on the day North Korea had detonated explosives at its only known nuclear test site, at Punggye-ri in front of international journalists; North Korea claimed that this would have demolished the test site.

On May 25, however, Trump announced that the summit could resume as scheduled following a "very nice statement" he received from North Korea and that talks were now resuming.

The following day, White House Press Secretary Sarah Sanders confirmed in a statement that a "pre-advance team for Singapore will leave as scheduled in order to prepare the summit should take place". The team, consisting of about thirty staffers from both the White House and State Department, met with North Korean counterparts over Memorial Day weekend.

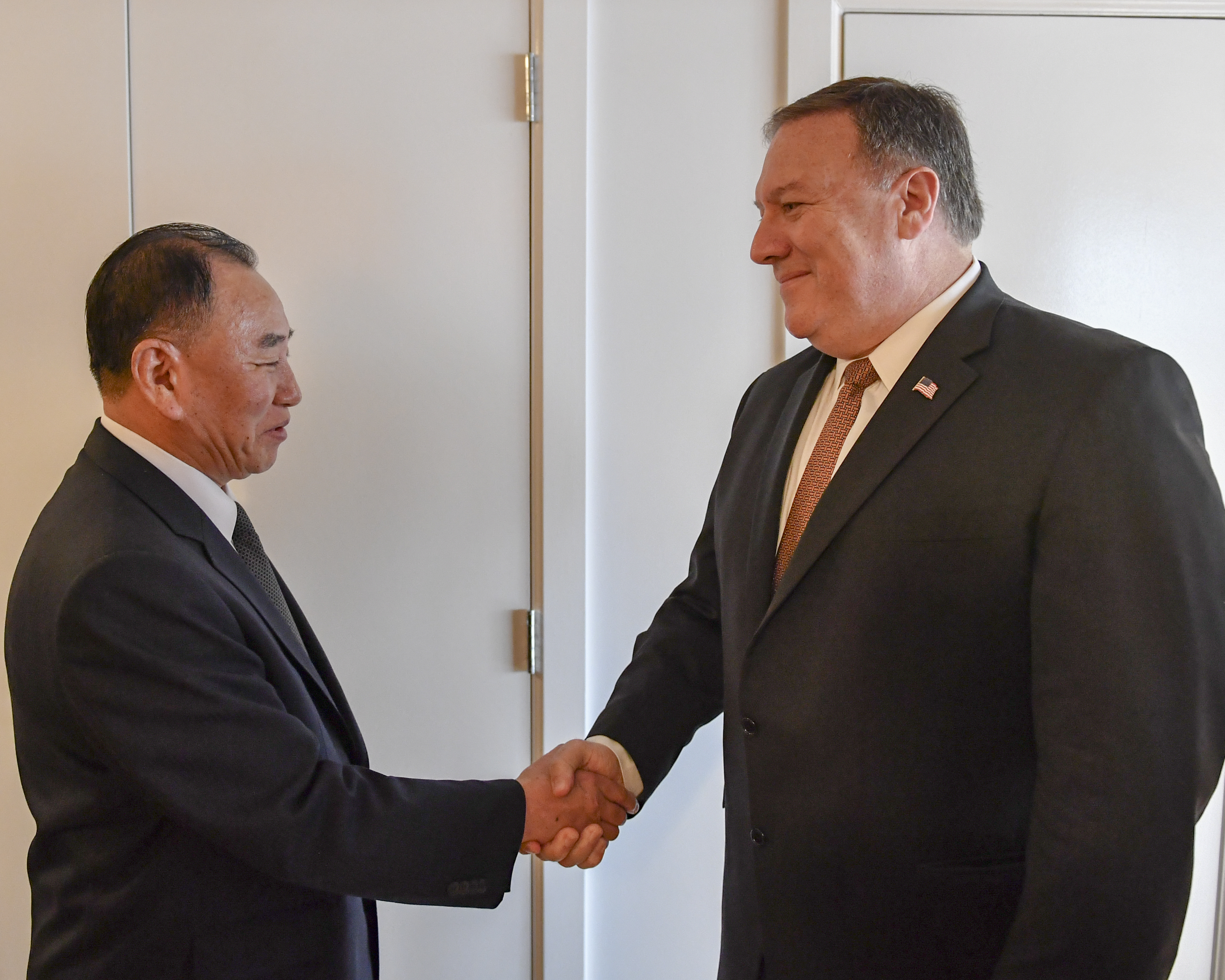
Kim Yong-chol met with Pompeo on May 30, and with Trump on June 1.

On May 30, North Korean general Kim Yong-chol arrived in New York City to meet with US Secretary of State Mike Pompeo. Negotiations between Kim and Pompeo continued the next day, and Pompeo later stated at a press conference that "good progress" had been made. Kim Yong-chol, who is the Vice Chair of Central Committee of the Workers' Party of Korea, is the highest-ranking North Korean official to visit the US since 2000 (when Jo Myong-rok met with US President Bill Clinton in Washington, D.C.).

On June 1, Trump announced the summit would resume as scheduled for June 12 after he met Kim Yong-chol at the White House. Kim Yong-chol delivered a letter from Kim Jong Un to Trump, of which Trump first told reporters that it was "a very nice" and "a very interesting letter", yet eight minutes later said "I haven't seen the letter yet. I purposely didn't open the letter".

=== US–South Korea summit ===
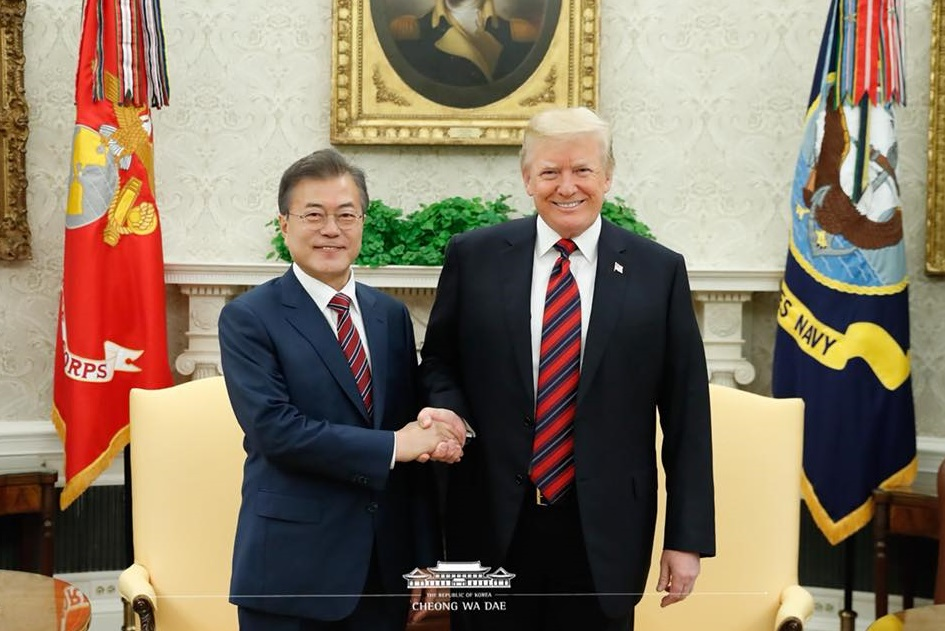
Moon Jae-in met with Trump on May 22.

On May 22, 2018, South Korea President Moon Jae-in visited the United States to meet President Trump, to promote Trump-Kim summit progress, and to coordinate the two countries' common strategy regarding the upcoming summit, following harsh rhetoric from North Korea towards Washington.

=== Closure of Punggye-ri Nuclear Test Site ===
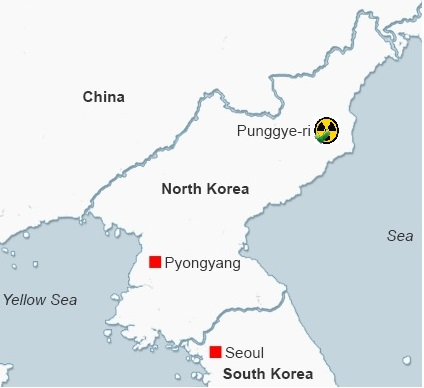
North Korea shut down its Punggye-ri nuclear test site on 23 May (Thursday) to demonstrate its commitment to denuclearization.

On 12 May 2018, North Korea announced the closure and planned dismantlement of its Punggye-ri Nuclear Test Site, and invited journalists to witness the destruction of its tunnels and other testing infrastructure. On 24 May 2018, reporters witnessed explosions to purportedly close those tunnels, although independent inspectors were not present. Those explosions destroyed the portals to several test tunnels, but the extent of the damage to the tunnels themselves was not clear.

=== Replacement of North Korean generals ===
On June 3, North Korea's Chairman Kim Jong Un replaced three general officers responsible for the development of North Korea's ICBM nuclear weapons.

=== May 2018 inter-Korean summit ===
Two leaders of North and South Koreas exchanged their opinions about the issues and solutions for the Trump-Kim summit as Trump abruptly canceled the upcoming US-North Korea summit on 12 June. The principal agenda of the meeting was trying to get U.S. summit back on track and keep progressing the denuclearization talks. The second 2018 summit was established by Kim Jung-un's suggestion within a whirlwind 24 hour notice, but Moon Jae-in accepted Kim's invitation as per the critical nuclear agenda between North and South Korea. Moon Jae-in had expressed his belief, and he discussed with Kim Jong Un about Kim's willingness to join nuclear interventions with Trump. Both leaders also agreed to accelerate the implementation of the Panmunjom Declaration and meet again at "anytime and anyplace" without formality.

=== Potential denuclearization process ===
During President Donald Trump's meeting with North Korea envoy, the former spy chief Kim Yong-chol at the White House, Trump said that he would choose the "denuclearization process" in North Korea. The nuclear warheads and the ICBM nuclear missiles completed in North Korea could be transferred outside of North Korea and economic sanctions on North Korea could be partly alleviated. The next step would be comprehensive inspections on North Korea's nuclear facilities and nuclear ICBM weapons program by IAEA. On July 7, 2018, U.S. Secretary of State Mike Pompeo, Japanese Foreign Minister Taro Kono and South Korean Foreign Minister Kang Kyung Wha met in Tokyo, where they reaffirmed their unity in urging North Korea to denuclearize as promised. The ministers stressed the need to call on North Korea to take concrete steps toward denuclearization and to keep existing U.N. economic sanctions in place. Ten days later, Donald Trump said there is "no time limit" for North Korea to denuclearize and that there is no need to rush the process.

=== Logistical preparations ===
On June 3, a "special event area" was declared by the Ministry of Home Affairs around the area surrounding the Shangri-La Hotel Singapore and stringent security measures would be in force from June 10 to 14. On the same day, a smaller segment within the "special event area" was declared a "special zone" by the Singapore Police Force where enhanced police powers would be in effect during the same period. On June 5, the Ministry of Home Affairs declared the whole of Sentosa Island, including waters off its south-west beaches, a "special event area" from June 10 to 14. The Capella Singapore, which served as the summit's main venue, is located on the Sentosa. The government also issued an order exempting four bulletproof and bombproof vehicles from certain traffic rules for the purposes of conveying "non-citizen" individuals for the summit from June 5 to 30.

The F1 Pit Building was designated to operate as the summit's "International Media Centre" from 10 am on June 10 to 10 pm on June 13, for international journalists to cover the summit.

On June 6, Singapore's aviation authorities announced that temporary airspace restrictions would be put in place for parts of June 11, 12 and 13. Aircraft arriving at Singapore Changi Airport were being required to reduce speed and some restrictions were placed on runway use. Aviators were also informed to stay away from Paya Lebar Air Base, a facility that had been used by US Presidents on their previous visits to Singapore.

The Singapore Mint released three commemorative medallions to mark the summit. They were issued in gold proof, silver proof, and nickel plated zinc proof.

On June 9, the Singapore Police Force and the Land Transport Authority announced that security measures, such as road closures and security checks, were going to kick in. Some bus stops in the Tanglin area would be skipped and security checks would be conducted along stretches of roads around the Shangri-La Hotel Singapore and the St Regis Hotel Singapore, the two hotels Trump and Kim were believed to be staying in. Bag searches and other security checks could be conducted for visitors entering Sentosa Island.

On June 11, Singapore's Minister for Foreign Affairs Vivian Balakrishnan announced that the Singapore government would be paying for the North Korean contingent's hotel bill, forming part of the total US$20 million expenditure for the summit, as it was "hospitality that we would have offered them". On June 25, the Ministry of Foreign Affairs (MFA) announced that the summit had cost S$16.3 million, lower than the initial planned cost mentioned by Prime Minister Lee Hsien Loong.

=== Diplomatic preparations ===
In preparation for the summit, Singapore's Minister for Foreign Affairs Vivian Balakrishnan visited the United States on a working visit and met with the United States Secretary of State Mike Pompeo and National Security Advisor John R. Bolton. He visited North Korea and met with North Korea's Minister of Foreign Affairs Ri Yong-ho and Chairman of the Presidium of the Supreme People's Assembly Kim Yong-nam to further lay the groundwork for the Trump-Kim summit.

The United States did not convene a Cabinet-level National Security Council meeting to discuss the summit with North Korea. Trump said: "I think I'm very well prepared ... I don't think I have to prepare very much ... this isn't a question of preparation, it's a question of whether or not people want it to happen, and we'll know that very quickly."

=== Media center ===
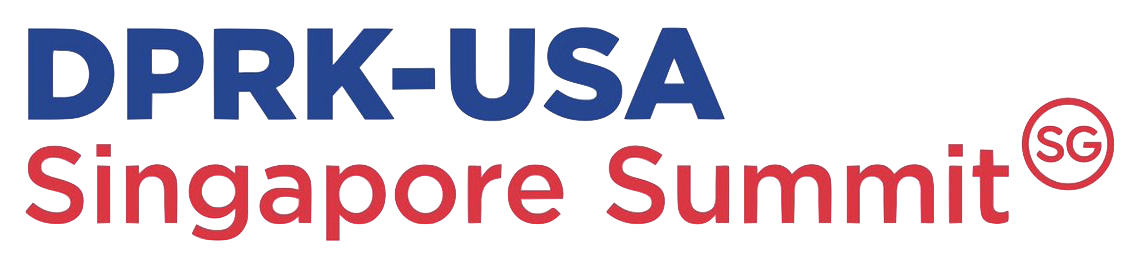
Logo used at the International Media Centre

Singapore Prime Minister Lee Hsien Loong visited the summit's International Media Centre on June 10 when it opened. At a media conference, Lee mentioned that the summit cost S$20 million, with security costs taking up S$10 million and the setting up of the International Media Centre costing S$5 million, but it is a cost that Singapore is "willing to pay". The media center opened to journalists and they were given customized items, including a bottle of water, a fan, and a notebook. The center hosted more than 2,500 local and international journalists.

== Meeting location ==
=== Background ===
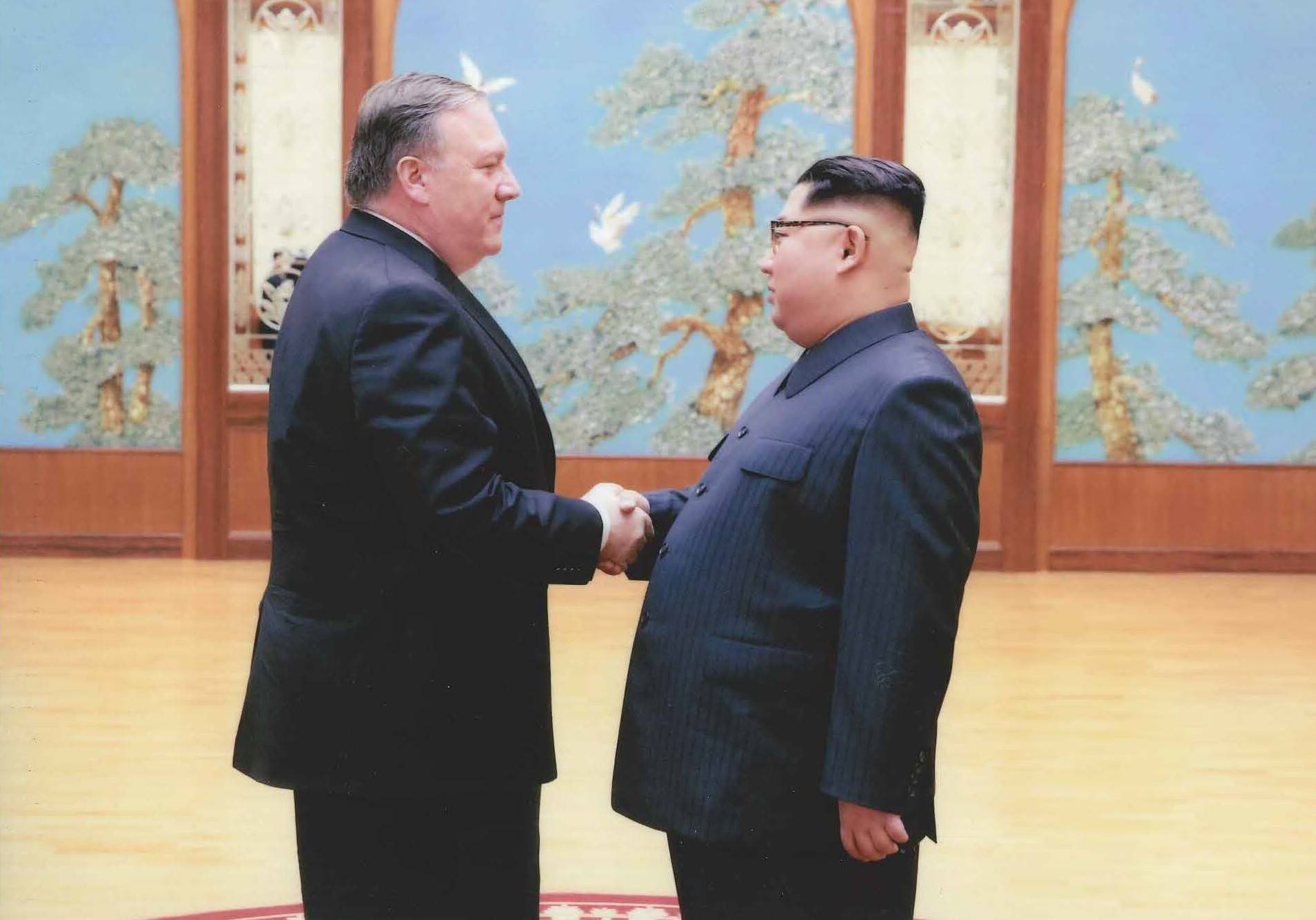
U.S. Secretary of State (then CIA Director) Mike Pompeo and Kim Jong Un meeting in Pyongyang, North Korea on March 31, 2018

On March 31 and possibly also April 1, then-CIA director Mike Pompeo had secretly met with Kim in Pyongyang to lay the groundwork for the summit, including their discussing possible venues. On April 17, on the day of a meeting at Mar-a-Lago of Trump with Prime Minister of Japan Shinzo Abe, sources revealed to reporters the identities involved in the discussions in Pyongyang.

=== Locations considered ===
Trump administration sources said on April 28 that the meeting would be held in either Singapore or Mongolia. On April 30, Trump remarked on a possibility the Peace House and inter-Korean House of Freedom (Joint Security Area) in Panmunjom would serve as venues. Trump believed that Panmunjom in DMZ would be the reasonable location for the meeting to remove nuclear weapons and to sign the preparatory peace treaty on the Korean peninsula.

The inter-Korean Peace House was where the 2018 inter-Korean summit was held earlier in April. Singapore was the site of a recent China–Taiwan summit. Mongolia has sponsored a number of talks in recent years involving regional and international players and is accessible by train from North Korea.

On April 30, Trump confirmed that Singapore, the Peace House and the inter-Korean House of Freedom were under consideration.

American officials said the most likely mutually-agreed-upon choice of venue would be in Southeast Asia or Europe, especially from among the choices of Singapore, Vietnam, Thailand, Switzerland (where Kim and his two siblings had some schooling), or Sweden (whose embassy acts as intermediary for Americans traveling in North Korea). Another possible location of the summit would be Ulaanbaatar, Mongolia.

Additionally proposed venues included Pyongyang, North Korea (favored by Kim); the Inter-Korean Peace House in Panmunjom near the boundary of the Demilitarized Zone between North and South Korea (site for the April 27, 2018 inter-Korean summit; a site possibly favored by Kim for the summit with the US as well); the Russian port city of Vladivostok (accessible to Kim by land or sea and nearby Vyatskoye, Kim's predecessor and father Kim Jong Il's February 16, 1941 birthplace); a Chinese city such as Shenyang, Changchun, or Beijing (favored by China); Seoul or South Korea's Jeju Island; or, aboard a US ship in international waters.

=== Announcement on holding the talks in Singapore ===
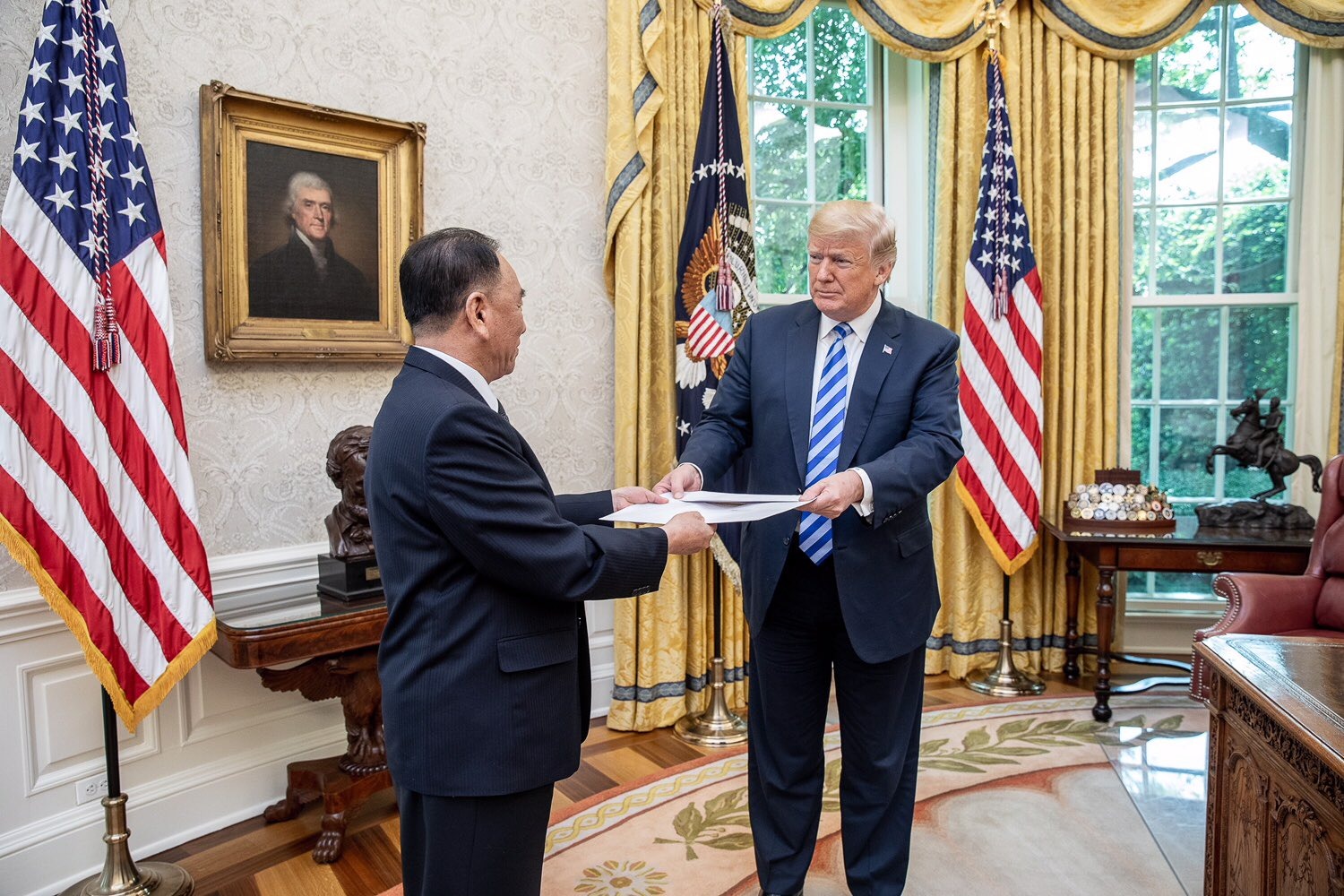
North Korea's Vice Chairman Kim Yong-chol delivers a personal letter from Kim to Trump, in the White House Oval Office on June 1, 2018.

CNN reported on May 9 that Singapore will be hosting the meeting on June 12. As per CNBC, a White House official said Singapore was chosen as it was willing to hold the summit and has diplomatic relations with both United States and North Korea. Trump confirmed the location on May 10 and announced that the summit is set for June 12. At 4,700 kilometres (2,900 mi) from Pyongyang's Sunan airport, Singapore is easily within the range of Kim's Soviet-made Il-62M aircraft. Local media reported that the most likely choice of venue would be the Shangri-La Hotel Singapore near Orchard Road, known for hosting the annual Shangri-La Dialogue and the 2015 Ma–Xi meeting. A South Korean report also cited The Istana, the official residence of the President of Singapore, as a possible venue to host the summit.

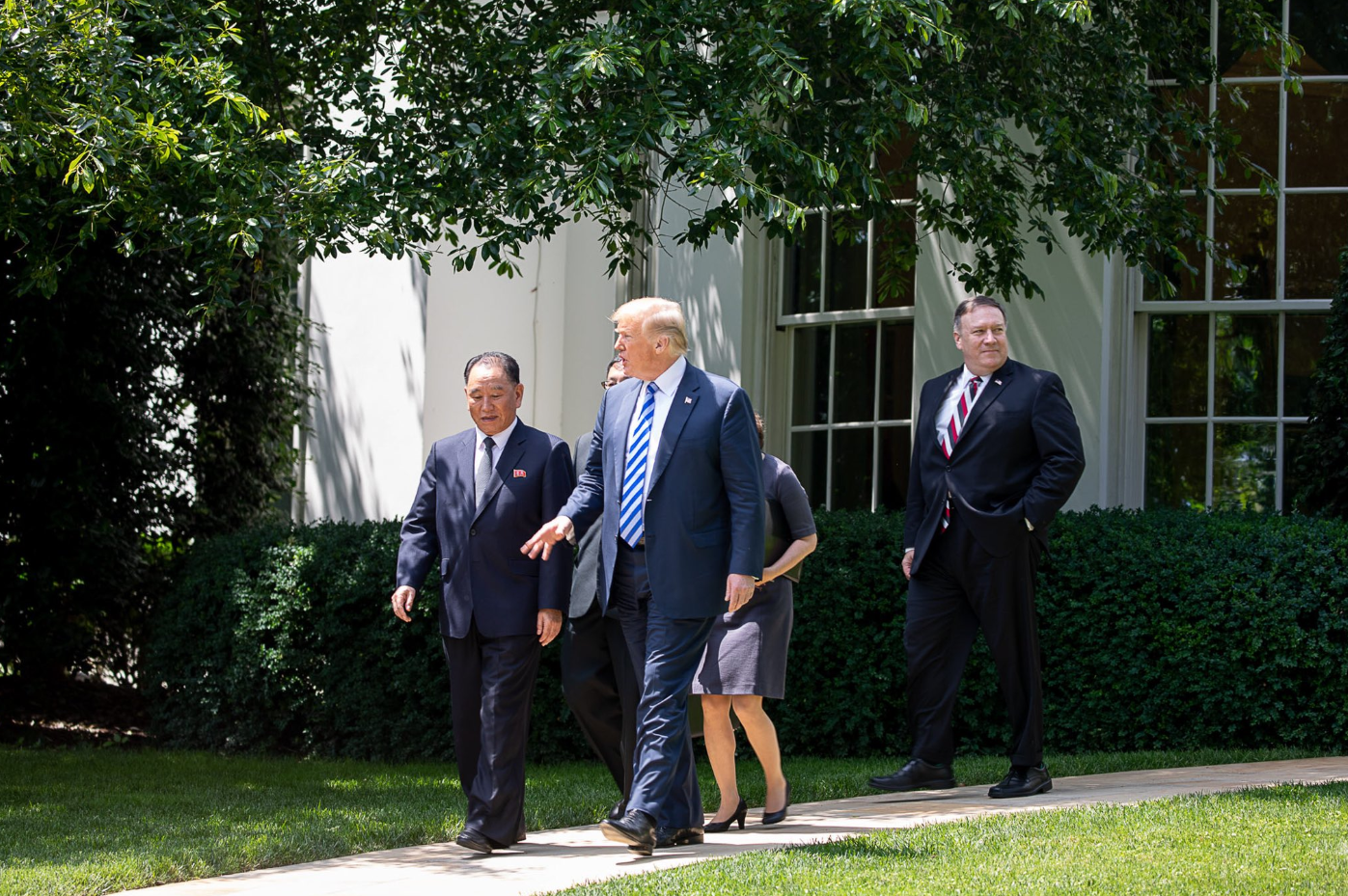
Trump together with Vice Chairman Kim Yong-chol of the North Korean delegation, outside the Oval Office

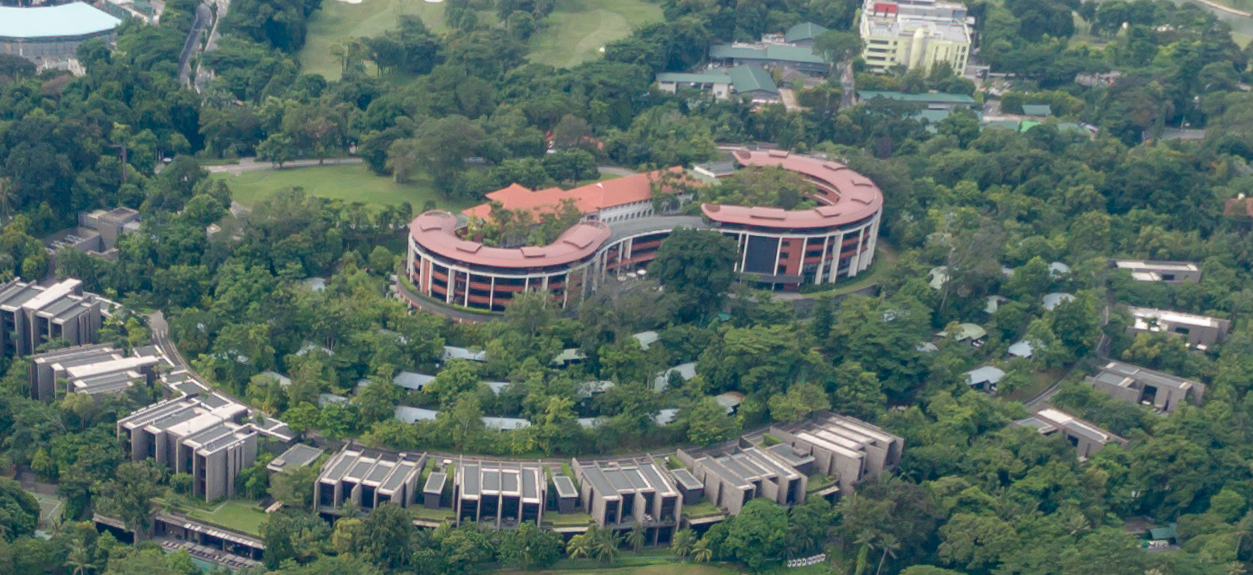
An aerial view of the Capella Singapore

Singapore's Ministry of Foreign Affairs further provided information on the summit stating that "Singapore is pleased to host the meeting between President of the United States Donald J. Trump and Democratic People's Republic of Korea State Affairs Commission Chairman Kim Jong Un on 12 June 2018. We hope this meeting will advance prospects for peace in the Korean Peninsula". However, the ministry did not provide any details on the venue and the arrangements.

Following Trump's renewed commitment to the summit on June 1, Singapore's Defence Minister Ng Eng Hen welcomed the move and stated that Singapore would cover some of the costs of the summit. Advance team members of the American and North Korean delegations that were meeting in Singapore in prior weeks were believed to have been staying in Capella Singapore on Sentosa, and the Fullerton Hotel Singapore in the city's Downtown Core respectively, both of which were additional venue options for the summit.

The White House announced on June 4 that the meeting will take place at 9:00 am (SGT), and confirmed the next day that Capella Singapore will be the venue for the June 12 summit. The US clarified that they would not pay for North Korea's officials' accommodation. They also affirmed that they would talk with the South Korean and Japanese governments if asked about the possible declaration of the end of the Korean War during the summit.

On June 9, 2018, at a press conference at the G7 Summit in Quebec, Trump estimated that the interpersonal chemistry between him and Leader Kim Jong Un would be a deciding factor in the success of the Summit in Singapore and that this would be a one-time chance for North Korea to strike a deal.

== Pre-summit events ==
=== Leaders' arrivals ===
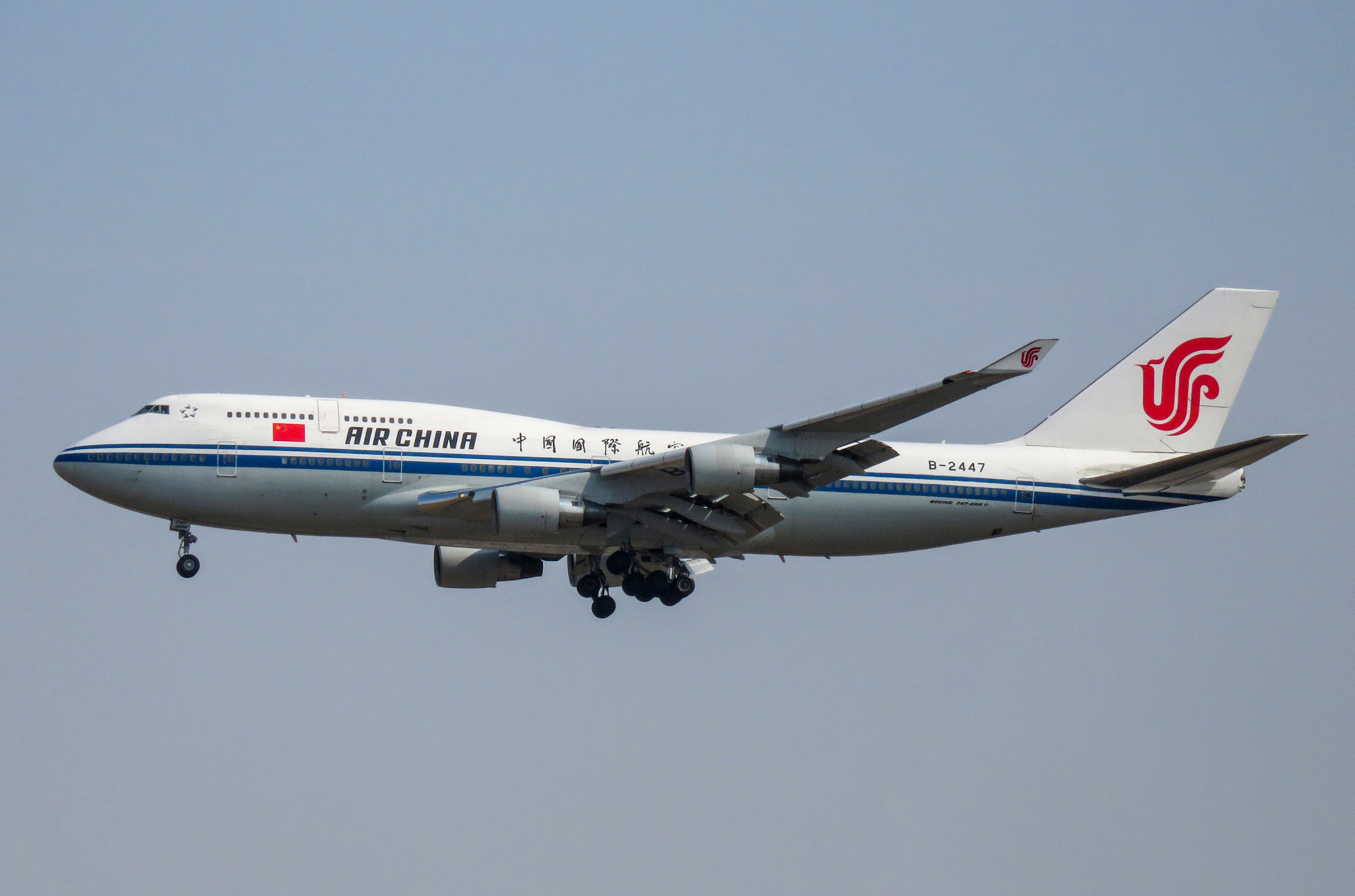
Kim arrived in Singapore in an Air China Boeing 747-400 registered B-2447; Photo of this aircraft taken in Beijing in March 2018

US President Donald Trump left the 44th G7 summit around four hours earlier than scheduled and departed directly for Singapore. He reportedly viewed the G7 summit as a "distraction" from his summit with Kim. Trump landed at Singapore's Paya Lebar Airbase at 20:20 local time and was welcomed by Singapore's Minister for Foreign Affairs Vivian Balakrishnan. A US Air Force Boeing C-17 Globemaster III transport plane was already at the air base ahead of his arrival. Trump stayed at the Shangri-La Hotel Singapore, which has also hosted previous US Presidents.

North Korean chairman Kim Jong Un landed at Singapore Changi Airport on Sunday at about 14:35 local time and was welcomed by Singapore's Minister for Foreign Affairs Vivian Balakrishnan and Minister for Education Ong Ye Kung. Kim flew to Singapore on a Boeing 747 operated by Air China, a plane used by the highest echelons of the Chinese leadership. According to media reports, a cargo plane, an Air Koryo Ilyushin Il-76, containing food items and other perishables landed in Singapore from North Korea before Kim's plane landed. Chiller trucks ferried them to the St. Regis Hotel Singapore where Kim stayed. A third plane from North Korea, an Air Koryo Ilyushin Il-62, landed shortly afterward; Kim's sister and Vice Director of the Propaganda and Agitation Department, Kim Yo Jong, was believed to be on board.

=== Working-level meetings ===
Both Trump and Kim met separately with Singapore Prime Minister Lee Hsien Loong. Kim met Lee on Sunday evening at The Istana. Trump met Lee on Monday afternoon, also at The Istana. He was accorded a bilateral meeting, followed by a working lunch and then an expanded bilateral meeting. During the meeting, Trump accepted President Halimah Yacob's invitation to make a State Visit to Singapore in November 2018, in conjunction with the 6th ASEAN-US Summit and 13th East Asia Summit.

A working-level meeting was held between the United States Ambassador to the Philippines Sung Kim and Vice Minister of Foreign Affairs Choe Son-hui, at The Ritz-Carlton Millenia Singapore on Monday morning. The meeting lasted over two hours and was believed to further work out the details of the summit between Trump and Kim and to push forward their agendas.

Meanwhile, North Korea's Minister of Foreign Affairs Ri Yong-ho met with his Singaporean counterpart Vivian Balakrishnan on Monday morning too.

=== Pre-summit activities ===
==== Trump's activities ====
After meeting Singapore's Prime Minister, Trump and Secretary of State Pompeo met and thanked the team at the United States embassy in Singapore and Task Force 73 at Shangri-La Hotel.

Trump then discussed the summit with South Korea's President Moon Jae-in in a 40-minute phone call, expressing that he is willing to take "bold decisions," while Moon said that South Koreans are praying for Trump to "create a miraculous result". He also spoke with Japan's Prime Minister Shinzo Abe on the phone.

==== US press briefing ====
Secretary of State Mike Pompeo gave a press briefing at the White House press room set up at the JW Marriott Hotel Singapore South Beach Hotel on Monday afternoon. He mentioned details of the preparations done by the US delegation and that the US is willing to offer North Korea security guarantees in exchange for the denuclearization of the Korean Peninsula.

==== South Korea press briefing ====
A South Korean official spoke at a closed-door press briefing held at South Korea's Korea Press Center, confirming that Moon Jae-in will not travel to Singapore to attend the summit, despite earlier speculations. Instead, South Korea sent a delegation to Singapore to monitor the summit.

==== Kim's tour of Singapore ====
Kim visited several of Singapore's attractions in the Central Area together with his sister, Kim Yo Jong, on Monday evening. They visited the Flower Dome at Gardens by the Bay, the Jubilee Bridge, and the Marina Bay Sands integrated resorts. They were accompanied by Singapore's Minister for Foreign Affairs Vivian Balakrishnan and Minister for Education Ong Ye Kung, the same ministers who welcomed him at Changi Airport the previous day.

==== Dennis Rodman ====
Retired U.S. basketball star Dennis Rodman, who made a number of visits to North Korea to promote sports and developed a personal relationship with Chairman Kim over several years, announced that he would be in Singapore during the summit but would not be involved in the meeting. Rodman arrived the day before the summit. The basketball star broke down in tears live on CNN as he recounted the hostility he faced for meeting Kim Jong Un.

== Summit meeting ==
External videos
- U.S.-North Korea Summit Sights and Sounds, June 11, 2018, C-SPAN
- President Trump Greets North Korean Leader Kim Jong Un, June 11, 2018, C-SPAN
- North Korean Media: KCTV's Coverage of Kim Jong Un's Diplomatic Push in 2018, 38 North

The summit was broadcast in real-time internationally.

=== One-to-one meeting ===
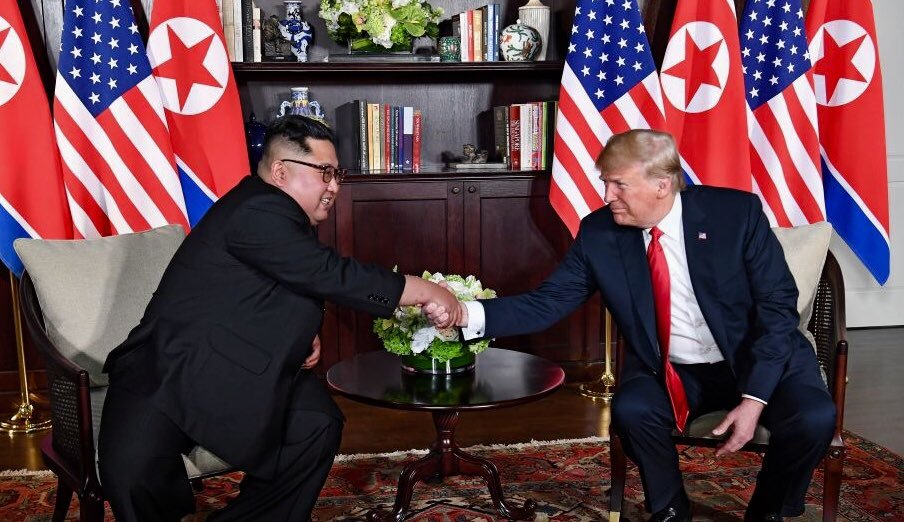
Kim and Trump before the start of their one-on-one meeting

United States President Donald Trump arrived at Capella Hotel first before North Korean leader Kim Jong Un arrived seventeen minutes later. They started the summit at 9:05 am local time with a 12-second handshake and then participated in a one-on-one meeting, with interpreters only. Trump and Kim emerged from the one-on-one talks and walked down the corridor to the Cassia where the expanded bilateral meeting took place. Trump described the one-on-one meeting as "very very good" when asked by a reporter. When Trump was asked if he had notes of the one-on-one meeting to refer back and verify, Trump replied, "I don't have to verify because I have one of the great memories of all time".

=== Expanded bilateral meeting and working lunch ===
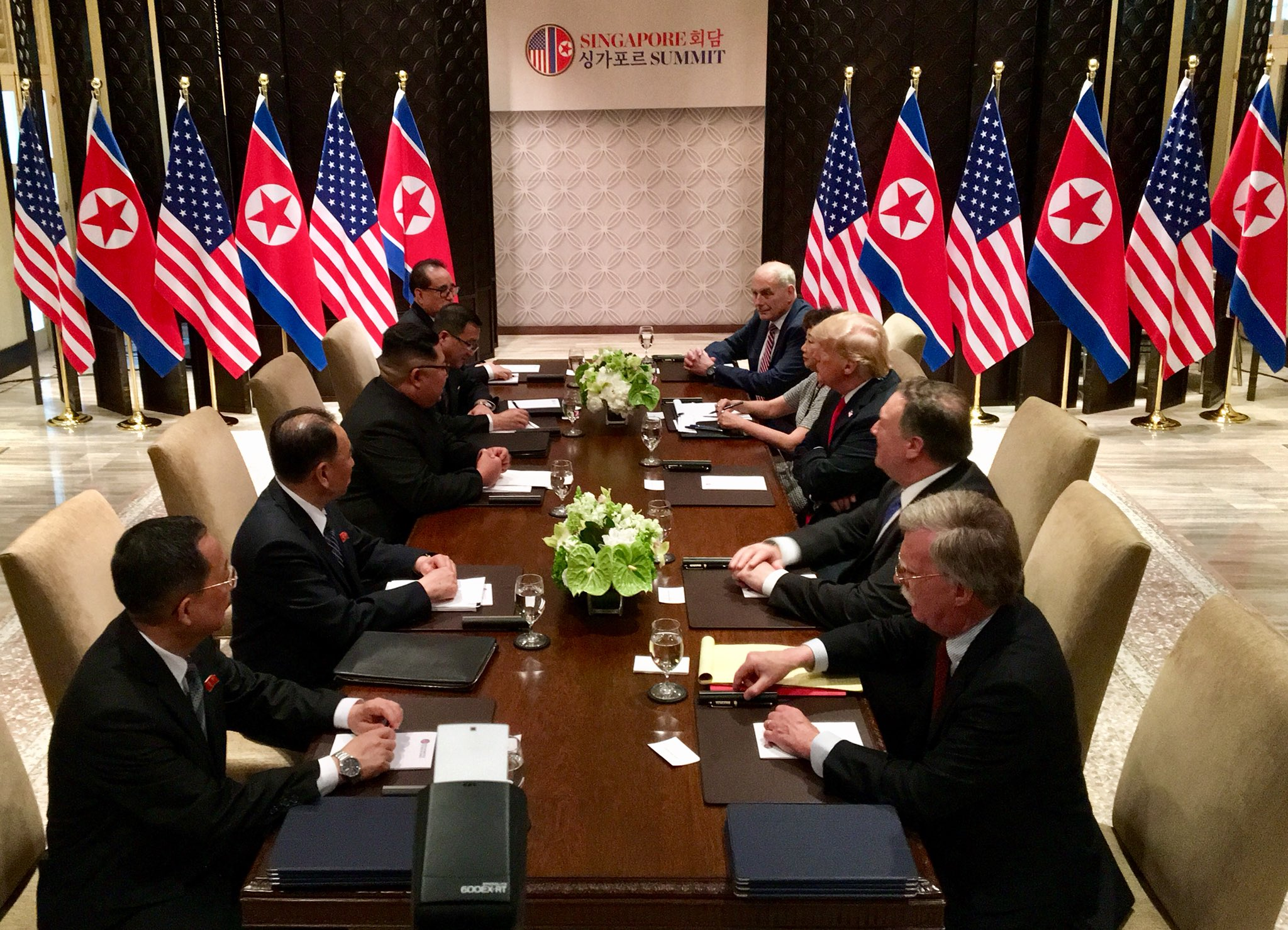
The expanded bilateral meeting between both the United States and North Korean delegations

Both countries' delegations proceeded to participate in an expanded bilateral meeting and a working lunch.

Both delegations dined together on Korean, Southeast Asian and Western dishes with ice cream, tropézienne, and dark chocolate ganache tartlet for dessert. After the lunch, Trump and Kim took a short walk together and viewed the interior of the presidential state car.

=== Joint signing ceremony ===
The signing moment of the two leaders

Subsequently, Trump and Kim signed a joint statement, titled "Joint Statement of President Donald J. Trump of the United States of America and Chairman Kim Jong Un of the Democratic People's Republic of Korea at the Singapore Summit", which Trump described as a "very important" and "comprehensive" agreement.

The document said:

President Trump and Chairman Kim Jong Un state the following:

1. The United States and the DPRK commit to establish new U.S.-DPRK relations in accordance with the desire of the peoples of the two countries for peace and prosperity.
2. The United States and the DPRK will join their efforts to build a lasting and stable peace regime on the Korean Peninsula.
3. Reaffirming the April 27, 2018 Panmunjom Declaration, the DPRK commits to work towards the complete denuclearization of the Korean Peninsula.
4. The United States and the DPRK commit to recovering POW/MIA remains including the immediate repatriation of those already identified.

In addition to the numbered provisions, the joint statement also mentions Trump's commitment to providing security guarantees to North Korea. Follow-up negotiations between Pompeo and an undetermined high-level North Korean official are also called for by the joint statement.

=== US news conference ===
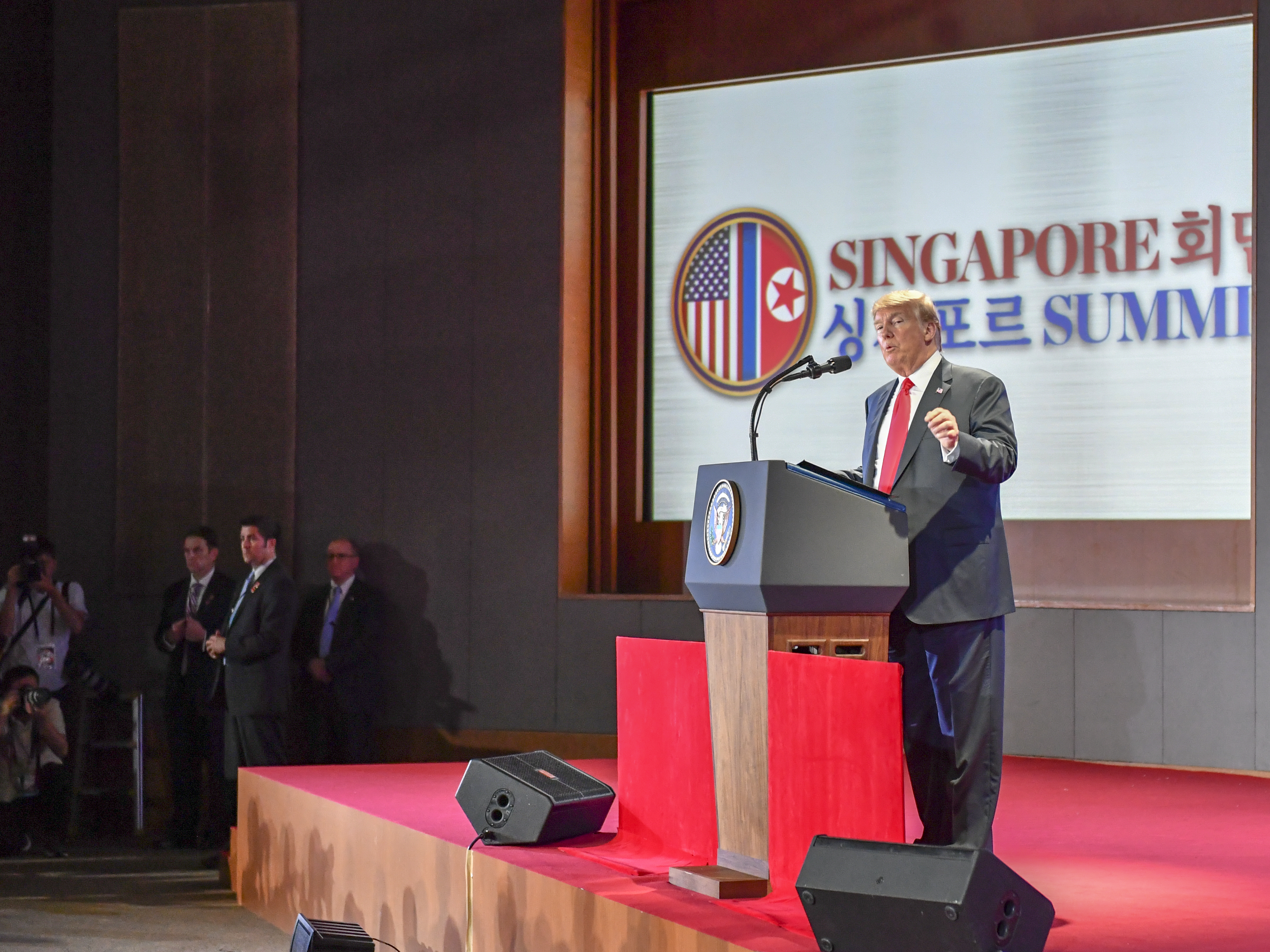
Trump at the news conference after the summit

Trump held a news conference at 16:15 local time which lasted for more than an hour. In his news conference, Trump said that further discussions will take place with North Korean officials and that he would consider visiting Pyongyang. Referring to his commitment in the Joint Statement to "provide security guarantees" to North Korea, Trump announced the end of the joint military exercises with the South Korean military, which he described as "provocative". U.S. Forces Korea and South Korea were apparently not consulted. He expressed his hope that the removal of 32,000 American troops defending South Korea would become part of the equation. The next round of joint military exercises was scheduled for late August.

=== End of summit ===
On June 12, Trump left Singapore from Paya Lebar Air Base at around 18:30 local time, earlier than his planned departure time of 19:00 while Kim Jong Un left Singapore from Changi Airport at around 22:30.

Upon returning to the United States the following day, President Trump declared that North Korea was no longer a nuclear threat. On June 22, 2018, Trump provided a "Notice Regarding the Continuation of the National Emergency with Respect to North Korea," which extended the Executive Order 13466 of 2008 by one year, reaffirming "the current existence and risk of the proliferation of weapons-usable fissile material on the Korean Peninsula constitute an unusual and extraordinary threat to the national security and foreign policy of the United States, and I hereby declare a national emergency to deal with that threat."

In October 2018, a second North Korea–United States summit was announced.

== Delegations in attendance ==
=== Participants in the expanded bilateral meeting ===
United States (USA)
Name	Title
Donald Trump	President
Mike Pompeo	Secretary of State
John F. Kelly	White House Chief of Staff
John R. Bolton	National Security Advisor

North Korea (DPRK)
Name	Title
Kim Jong Un	Chairman of the State Affairs Commission
Ri Yong-ho	Minister of Foreign Affairs
Kim Yong-chol	Vice Chairman of the Workers' Party of Korea
Ri Su-yong	Vice Chairman of the Central Committee of the Workers' Party of Korea

=== Other delegates ===
United States (USA)
Name	Title
Cabinet of the United States
Randall Schriver	Assistant Secretary of Defense for Asian and Pacific Security Affairs
White House Office
Sarah Huckabee Sanders	White House Press Secretary
Stephen Miller	Senior Advisor to the President
National Security Council (NSC)
Mira Ricardel	Deputy National Security Advisor
Sarah Tinsley	NSC Director for Strategic Communications
Matthew Pottinger	NSC Senior Director for Asian Affairs
Brenan Richards	NSC Director for Southeast Asian Affairs
Allison Hooker	NSC Member
Central Intelligence Agency (CIA)
Andrew Kim	Director of the CIA Korea Mission Center
Ambassadors of the United States
Sung Kim	Ambassador to the Philippines
P. Michael McKinley	Ambassador to Brazil
Stephanie Syptak-Ramnath	Chargé d'affaires (acting Ambassador) at the US Embassy in Singapore
Melissa Brown	Counsellor for Economic and Political Affairs at the US Embassy in Singapore

North Korea (DPRK)
Name	Title
Government of North Korea
No Kwang-chol	Minister of People's Armed Forces
Choe Son-hui	Vice Minister of Foreign Affairs
Workers' Party of Korea (WPK)
Kim Yo Jong	Kim Jong Un's sister Vice Director of the Propaganda and Agitation Department
Other members of the Central Committee and the State Affairs Commission

== Reactions ==
The summit received a mixed international reaction, with many countries expressing praise or hope for achieving a peace deal from the summit. Some commentators expressed skepticism towards the signed agreement, pointing to a history of failed past agreements and to the vague wording of the declarations. China raised the possibility of sanction relief following the summit, but Pompeo said sanction relief would only be granted after complete denuclearization. Joint-military exercises between the United States and South Korea were halted, a demand that North Korea had long made. Trump also said he wished to bring the U.S. soldiers back home at some point, but reinforced that it was not part of the Singapore equation. On August 1, 2018, the U.S. Senate passed the military budget bill for 2019, forbidding any funding that would reduce the active United States Forces Korea personnel below 22,000; significant removal of US forces was considered a non-negotiable item in denuclearization talks with the North. Visitors to North Korea reported that anti-American posters, postcards, stamps and similar items were no longer sold in tourist shops.

== Incidents ==
On June 9, two South Korean media personnel from South Korean broadcaster KBS News were arrested for trespassing at the home of the North Korean ambassador in Singapore. KBS News subsequently issued an apology for not being cautious. The two media personnel were deported the next day on June 10.

On June 11, five South Korean women were arrested on Monday night for protesting outside the St. Regis Hotel where Chairman Kim and his delegation were staying. The police warned the women for violating the Public Order Act but they refused to cooperate, leading to their arrests.

== Aftermath ==
=== Progress of joint statement ===
The director of USC Korean Studies Institute David C. Kang wrote an analysis of North Korea's solution which was published in The New York Times. Writing that the Trump administration should proceed with the necessary action items of U.S. side in order to ask North Korea to give up their Nuclear Weapons, Kang emphasized that unilateral disarmament of the DPRK would be impractical, and that a "phased" and "synchronous" approach with "step by step" negotiations would be a more reasonable way forward, with respect to the US-DPRK Joint Statement signed at the Singapore summit. The DPRK has shown eight or more types of various actions on their portion of the agreement; a moratorium on missile/nuclear tests, dismantling the Sohae atomic test and satellite launch site, the shutting down of an intercontinental ballistic missile assembly facility near Pyongyang, the returning of the remains of 55 U.S. Soldiers killed in the Korean War, the removal of domestic anti-American propaganda, and the release of three American Citizens arrested and imprisoned in the DPRK, as North Korean action items of the summit. However, the US has thus far taken only one action; the canceling of joint military exercises between the US and South Korean Air Forces in the peninsula. If the United States should complete more of its action items under the Singapore agreement, with regard to North Korea's security concerns, the North Korean government in turn may be willing to make further actions toward denuclearization. North Korean minister Ri Yong-ho has claimed that the US is backtracking or has made no progress on the American side of the Singapore Summit agreement, while saying that North Korea itself has taken some measures including the cessation of nuclear and missile testing, along with the removal of a primary nuclear site. US Secretary of State Mike Pompeo has made a request for North Korea to hand over 60 to 70 percent of its nuclear arsenal within six to eight months. However, the DPRK has not yet accepted that proposal. The North Korean foreign minister released an announcement criticizing unilateral denuclearization, and Ri Yong-ho has emphasized that it is only equitable to perform a "balanced, simultaneous, step-by-step implementation" of the US-DPRK Joint Statement. There are four action items in the Joint Statement, the first and second items being the renewal of North Korea–United States relations, the third item being the denuclearization of the Korean Peninsula, and the final item the recovery of American POW/MIA remains from the Korean War. Currently, there are still three American nuclear capable jets stationed in South Korea. Additionally, North and South Korea, still lacking a proper peace treaty, are still technically at war. North Korea urged the US to guarantee North Korea's security by a formal declaration of the ending of the Korean War, in exchange for the DPRK ending its nuclear program and forfeiting its nuclear weapons. Doug Bandow, a special assistant to former President Ronald Reagan, suggested that the US provide the DPRK with a safety framework in the form of a peace treaty, in exchange for the DPRK ending their nuclear program.

=== Removed anti-American propaganda in DPRK ===
The DPRK government toned down aspects of its anti-American propaganda after the Singapore summit, with many anti-American posters being removed in the capital to give way to less politicized messages. The government also canceled North Korea's annual "anti-US imperialism" rally on 27 July, a national holiday commemorating the start of the Korean War (Fatherland Liberation War in DPRK historiography).

=== Pompeo's subsequent visits to North Korea ===
From July 6 to 7, Pompeo traveled to North Korea for the third time to continue the negotiations with Kim Yong-chol, "a senior official who has been [North Korea's] point person in deliberations with the United States, South Korea and China". After the meeting, Pompeo said that the talks were productive and that progress had been made "on almost all of the central issues". However, North Korean state media criticized the meeting soon after, saying the U.S. had shown a "gangster-like attitude" and calling the demands of the Trump administration "deeply regrettable". Notwithstanding the stern reports, Pompeo delivered a letter from Kim to Trump, in which the latter expressed his hope for successful implementation of the US-North Korea Joint Statement and reaffirmed his will for improving the relations between the countries.

Pompeo announced on August 23, 2018, that he would return to North Korea the following week for the fourth round of talks. The following day, Trump tweeted that he had asked Pompeo not to make the trip because he felt "we are not making sufficient progress with respect to the denuclearization of the Korean Peninsula." Concerning the cancellation of Pompeo's planned North Korea trip, Vox summarized the background based on the reports by The Washington Post and CNN that North Korea delivered an irate letter to Pompeo and the letter was shown to Trump in the Oval Office on Friday, and Trump tweeted the cancellation of Pompeo's trip. The message from DPRK was North Korea's evident disappointment as Washington had shown no real eagerness to sign a peace treaty to end the Korean War.

South Korean Foreign Minister Kang Kyung-wha spoke to Pompeo by telephone on August 25, urging the U.S. and DPRK to continue talks relating to denuclearization and peace on the Korean peninsula, in spite of concerns over the cancellation of the trip by Trump. Japanese Foreign Minister Taro Kono revealed appreciation for Pompeo's "prompt communication" with South Korea, and said Japan would be pleased to cooperate with the U.S. for denuclearization of the Korean peninsula.

=== Return of remains of US soldiers ===
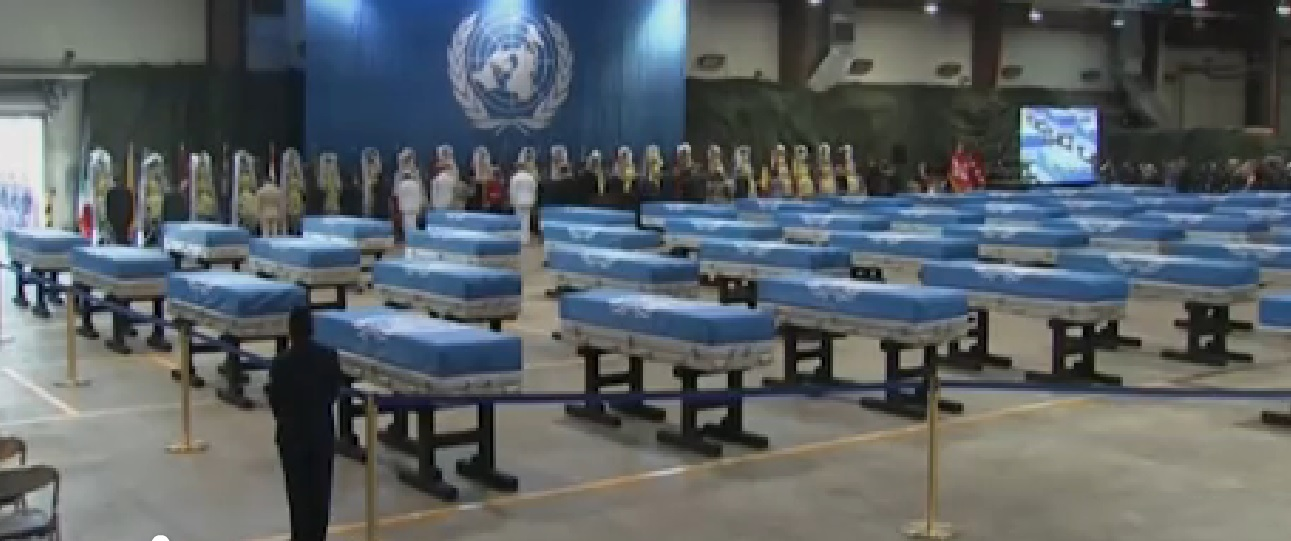
After the Trump-Kim summit, North Korea searched for and returned the remains of U.S. POWs and MIAs from the Korean War.

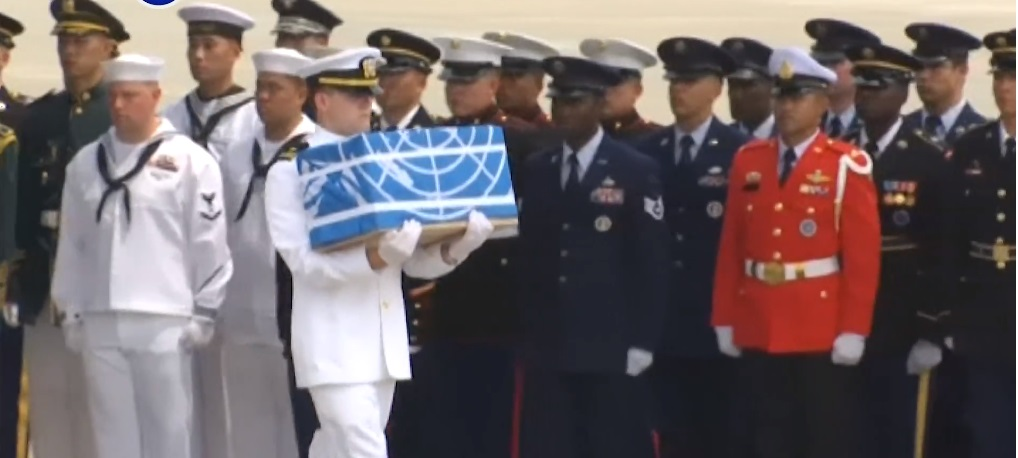
The remains of US soldiers in North Korea start the journey to the U.S. after 65 years.

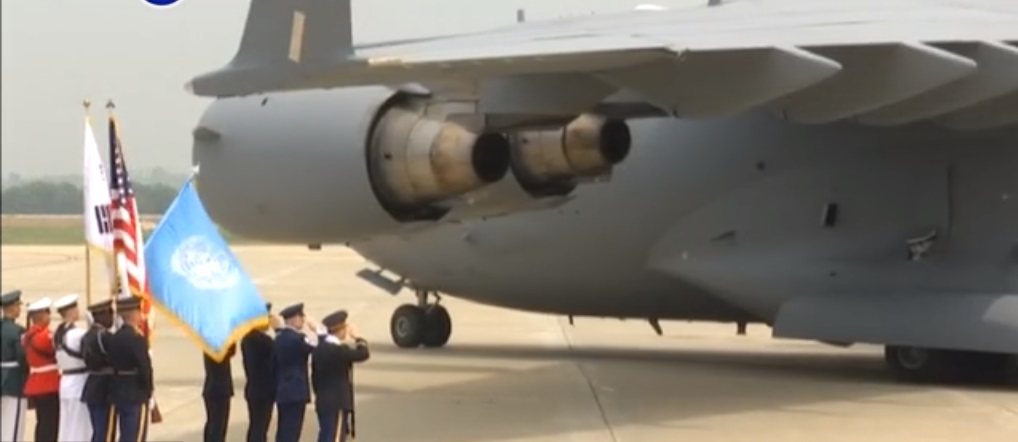
The US war remains were delivered from Wonsan, North Korea by U.S. military transport plane C-17 Globemaster to the Osan Air Base near Seoul, South Korea.

On June 27, Pompeo said North Korea was planning to hand over presumed remains of U.S. soldiers killed during the Korean War in the near future. In preparation, the U.S. military had moved 158 metal coffins through the DMZ border between North and South Korea one week earlier.

Following Pompeo's second visit to Pyongyang, a lower ranks meeting took place on July 15 regarding the retrieving of remains of US soldiers from the Korean War. Pompeo called the talks "productive" and said the two sides had reached firm commitments on the issue. On July 27 North Korea handed over 55 boxes of human remains, thus starting to fulfill their pledge in the Singapore declaration. The remains were saluted in a ceremony in their honor by US soldiers. More than 36,000 American troops died during the Korean War, but some 7,700 remain unaccounted for, including 5,300 believed to have died in North Korea. Earlier, 220 remains were recovered during 1996–2005. North Korea reported to the U.S. Defense POW/MIA Accounting Agency that they couldn't be sure how many individuals were represented in each of the 55 boxes.

There was uncertainty about the nationality of the war remains, whether the individuals were American or from other countries that took part in the Korean War, such as Australia, Belgium, France, and the Philippines. Kelly McKeague, the director of the POW/MIA Accounting Agency, said a preliminary review showed that the remains are "consistent" with being American and are from the Battle of Chosin Reservoir. The next phase would be matching the dental records, X-rays and DNA testing to further analyze the remains for possible identification. McKeague expressed his opinion that North Korea needs to allow the resumption of joint U.S.-North Korean searches of battlefields and POW camp graveyards to discover more war remains as soon as practical.

=== Shutdown of ICBM assembly facility near Pyongyang ===
The Voice of America (VOA) reported on July 25 that there is evidence that North Korea has dismantled an intercontinental ballistic missile (ICBM) construction facility near Pyongyang. It was confirmed by analyzing satellite images taken around the March 16 with the latest satellite images in July. It was the investigated place of the factory that the Hwasong-15 ICBM that North Korea test-launched on November 29, 2017, was assembled at this plant and then moved on a transporter-erector-launcher (TEL). Kim Jong Un was at this vehicle factory that was connected to the ICBM assembly factory when he gave the command for the transfer of the TEL carrying the Hwasong-15 ICBM. State Department Spokesperson Heather Nauert announced that the U.S. would be looking for DPRK's consent for allowing the Verification process of the denuclearization of North Korea. Heather also added "Verification is obviously something that is paramount. Verification from legitimate groups and done by legitimate countries."

=== Destruction of missile test site ===
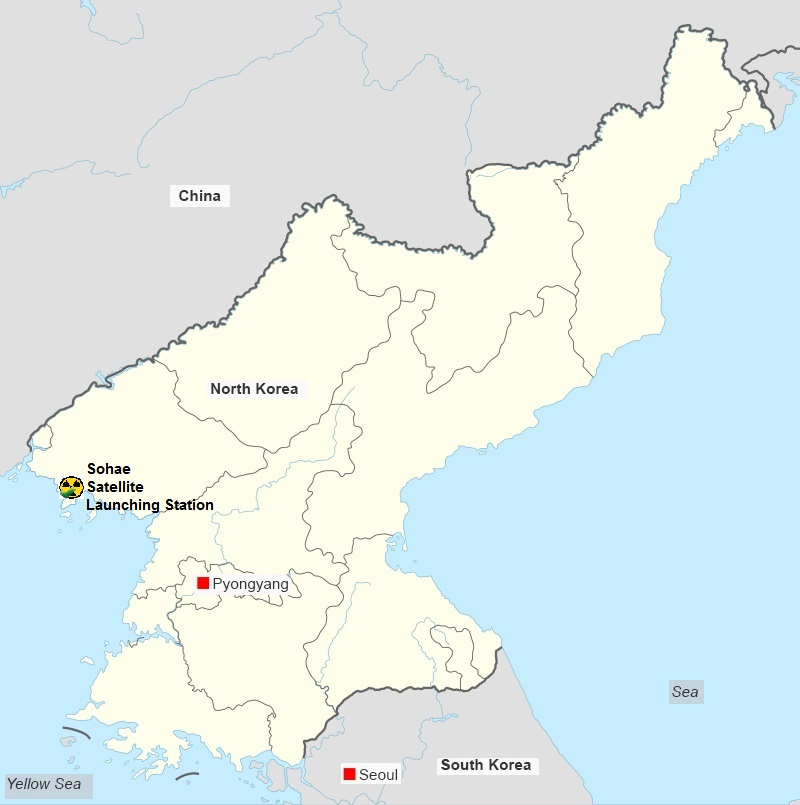
North Korea dismantled the various significant parts and permanent structure of the Sohae ICBM missile & Satellite Launching Station.

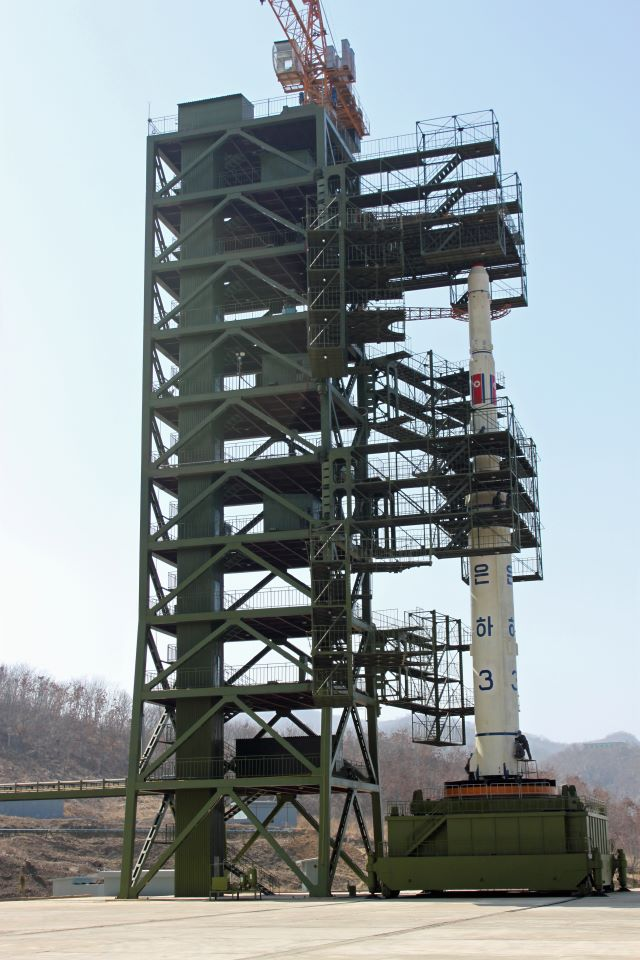
The North Korean government had begun to dismantle an ICBM rocket launching and testing engine site to demonstrate its commitment to denuclearization. CBS News has identified the site as the freshest of North Korea's recognized major missile testing facilities.

On July 24, it was reported that North Korea had begun to dismantle a rocket launching and testing site near Tonchang, an action which Kim had pledged to Trump. South Korean President Moon called the move "a good sign for North Korea's denuclearization". The North Korea monitoring specialist group 38 North found that the Sohae Station, a satellite-launch site in North Korea, was being demolished. Satellite imagery shows that several significant structures were destroyed: a missile-launching stand and a building near a launchpad for satellites. 38 North suggested that it is an essential beginning step towards achieving a commitment made by Kim Jong Un at the June 12 Singapore Summit. On 7 August, there is more progress on Dismantling Facilities at the Sohae Satellite and Missile Launching Station. it entails the demolition of the test stand's concrete foundations, launch pad's gantry tower and pad foundation, etc. While the previous dismantlement of the vertical engine test stand on 23 July, represents a fulfillment of Chairman Kim's arrangement with President Trump conducted publicly during the post-Singapore Summit press conference, activity at the launch pad and concrete foundation appears to go exceeding that pledge. These activities, however, must be viewed cautiously as "principal steps" since neither are presently permanent or irreversible. Concerning 38 North's scrutiny, it would characterize more durable and irreversible actions as there is no identified facility with equivalent capabilities elsewhere in the DPRK.

North Korea announced in December 2019 that it had recently conducted a "very important test" at the Sohae site. Some analysts believed the test involved a new ICBM engine, as the country was believed to be migrating from its liquid-fueled missiles to new solid-fueled versions that were easier to transport, conceal and launch. The country announced it had conducted a "crucial test' at the Sohae site days later.

=== Negotiation process between US and DPRK ===
In August, during the ASEAN Regional Forum 2018, North Korea's nuclear program was the critical agenda item. ASEAN forum foreign ministers issued a joint statement calling for a "complete denuclearization" which is the same phrase used in the joint statement issued after the summit, and represents a change from last year's call for a "complete, verifiable and irreversible denuclearization". South Korea's Foreign Minister Kang Kyung-wha has said that she had "considerable" consultations over the issue of the declaration to a formal end of the 1950-53 Korean war with the Chinese and U.S. foreign ministers. Chinese Foreign Minister Wang Yi said "everyone can announce a declaration ending the war if they do not want the war to happen again". North Korean Foreign Minister Ri Yong Ho said he was "alarmed" by U.S. insistence on maintaining sanctions until North Korea denuclearizes and what he said was U.S. reluctance to declare a formal end to the Korean War. United States Forces in Korea maintains several nuclear bomber fighters, and DPRK is demanding USA safety guarantee for giving up nuclear weapon programs of Pyongyang.

=== Questions about missile development ===
The media source 38 North, an American agency which monitors North Korea, told CNN that only two small roof buildings had been newly erected, which might be used for hospitality roles for senior officials or nuclear inspectors. Other improved infrastructures were already developed before the Trump-Kim Summit. On June 30, NBC reported that, according to an assessment by the U.S. intelligence agencies, North Korea might have increased production of fuel for nuclear weapons at multiple secret sites after the summit, though if the process of enrichment had occurred, it must have begun before the summit. On August 3, experts monitoring U.N. sanctions against North Korea sent a report to the UN Security Council saying North Korea "has not stopped its nuclear and missiles programs" and is still violating sanctions by transferring coal at sea and flouting an arms embargo and financial sanctions. However, North Korean Foreign Minister Ri-Yong Ho said in a privilege speech at the ASEAN summit, that a "good-faith implementation of the Joint Statement (between the USA and DPRK) would be necessary". Referring to this same speech, the North Korea monitoring specialist Group, 38 North, believes that in order to achieve the goal to denuclearize, a scheme of ALL TAKE-NO GIVE will never work with DPRK.

The New York Times reported on November 12, 2018, that "satellite images suggest that the North has been engaged in a great deception" by offering to dismantle one missile launch site while continuing to develop sixteen others. The Times reported that American intelligence had determined that North Korea's production of fissile material, nuclear weapons and mobile missile systems had continued since the summit, adding that the missile network was "long known to American intelligence agencies but left undiscussed as President Trump claims to have neutralized the North's nuclear threat." The following day, Trump called the report of North Korea developing missile sites "inaccurate" and "just more fake news," adding "We fully know about the sites being discussed, nothing new." The Times stood by the accuracy of its report. On November 13, 2018, Kim Eui Keum, a spokesman for South Korean President Moon Jae-In, described the report and images as "nothing new" and further stated that North Korea "has never signed any agreement, any negotiation that makes shutting down missile bases mandatory."

CNN acquired satellite images in December 2018 that indicated North Korea was continuing to significantly expand a major long-range missile site in the mountainous interior of the country, including an "extremely large underground facility" that could be under construction as of August 2018.

== Second U.S.–North Korean Summit ==
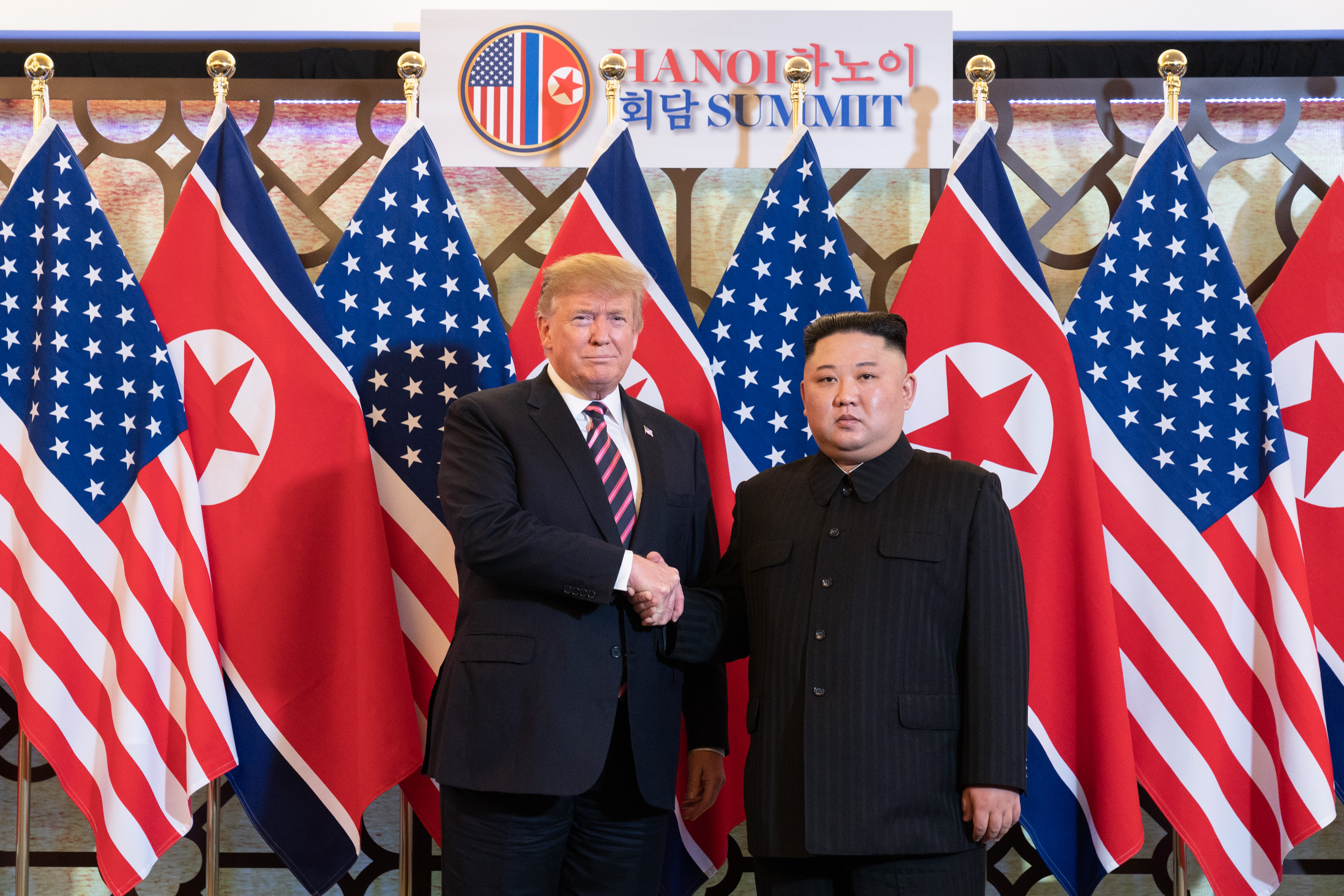
Trump and Kim at the Hanoi Summit

On October 7, 2018, U.S. Secretary of State Mike Pompeo and Kim met in Pyongyang and agreed to a second U.S.–North Korea summit, with South Korea's presidential office stating that it would take place "as soon as possible". Pompeo said a second summit would happen soon, and that details would be revealed to South Korean President Moon Jae-In during a meeting in the South Korean capital of Seoul. During the State of the Union Address President Trump announced Vietnam would host the second meeting between the two leaders. The summit was held in Hanoi, Vietnam, on February 27 and 28, 2019, but ended without a new deal. Trump said he was dissatisfied with the incomplete denuclearization offered by Kim, who demanded, in return, the full lifting of American sanctions on North Korea.

== See also ==
- 2018–19 Korean peace process
- Korean reunification
- North Korea–United States relations
  - Agreed Framework
  - 2019 North Korea–United States Hanoi Summit (the second Trump–Kim summit)
- Peace Treaty on Korean Peninsula
- North Korea and weapons of mass destruction
- Nuclear power in North Korea
- List of nuclear weapons tests of North Korea
- 2017–18 North Korea crisis
- 2017 North Korean missile tests
- April 2018 inter-Korean summit
- May 2018 inter-Korean summit
- September 2018 inter-Korean summit
- Kim–Xi meetings, unofficial North Korea–China summit
- Kim–Putin meetings, unofficial North Korea–Russia summit
- List of international trips made by Kim Jong Un
- Inter-Korean Liaison Office bombing
