= Sungjibaegam =

Locality in Paegam County, North Korea

Coordinates: 41°14′34″N 128°47′56″E

- Hangul: 승지백암
- Hanja: 承旨白岩
- RR: Seungjibaegam
- MR: Sŭngjibaegam

Sungjibaegam is a locality in Paegam County, Ryanggang Province in North Korea. It is associated with Paegam-rodongjagu (Paegam Workers' District). It is about 35 km south of Paegam Town, also part of the county.

It is served by Paegam Chongnyon Station (trains). Punggye-ri Nuclear Test Site for the North Korean nuclear test on 12 February 2013 was located 23km ENE of Sungjibaegam.
