= Punggye-ri =

Punggye-ri 풍계리

Korean transcription(s)
  - Chosŏn'gŭl: 풍계리
  - Hancha: 豊溪里
  - McCune-Reischauer: P'unggyeri
  - Revised Romanization: Punggyeri
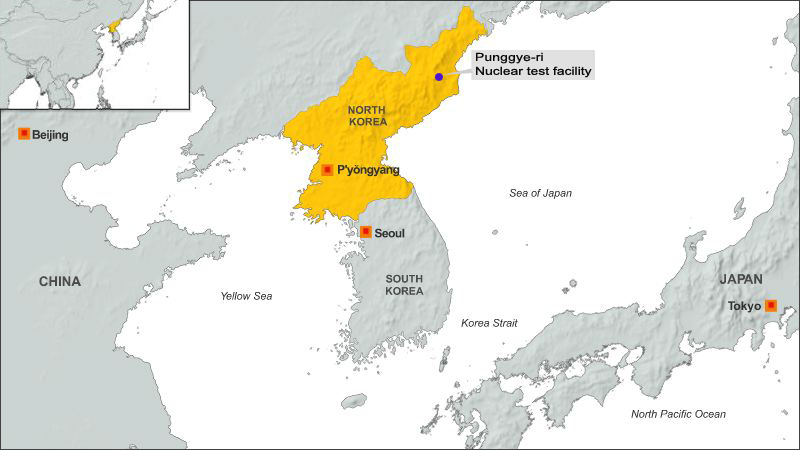

- Map of North Korea showing the location of Punggye-ri nuclear test site
- Coordinates: 41°16′42″N 129°05′13″E
- Country: North Korea
- Province: North Hamgyong Province
- County: Kilju County

P'unggye-ri is a village located in Kilju County, North Hamgyong Province, North Korea. The Punggye Station serves the village. The Punggye-ri Nuclear Test Site is located nearby.

== See also ==
- Punggye-ri Nuclear Test Site – the primary nuclear test site in DPRK
