= Punggye-ri Nuclear Test Site =

North Korean nuclear test site

Punggye-ri
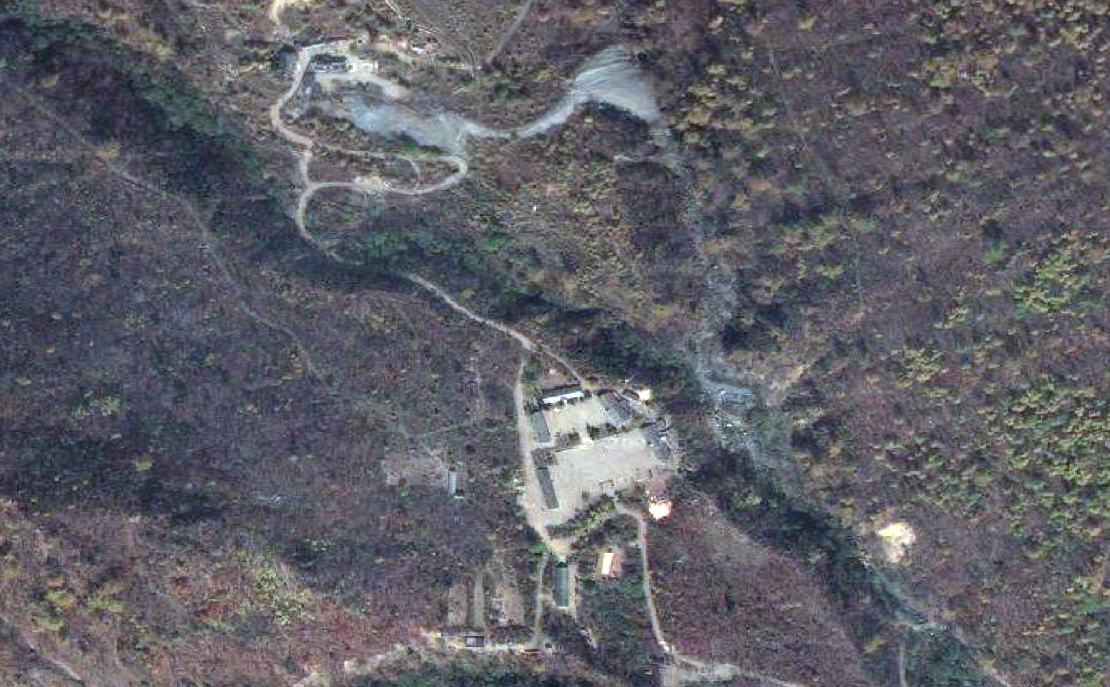
- Official name: 풍계리 핵 실험장
- Country: North Korea
- Coordinates: 41°16′41″N 129°05′15″E
- Status: Partially demolished
- Decommission date: 25 May 2018
- Owner: North Korea
- Operator: North Korea

External links
- Commons: Related media on Commons

Location of Punggye-ri Nuclear Test Site

Punggye-ri Nuclear Test Site (Korean: 풍계리 핵 실험장; Hancha: 豊溪里核實驗場) was the only known nuclear test site of North Korea. Nuclear tests were conducted at the site in October 2006, May 2009, February 2013, January 2016, September 2016, and September 2017.

== Geography ==
The site was established in the early 2000s and has three visible tunnel entrances. It is in mountainous terrain in Kilju County, North Hamgyong Province, about 2 km (1.2 mi) south of Mantapsan, 2 km (1.2 mi) west of Hwasong concentration camp and 12 km (7.5 mi) northwest of the Punggye-ri village. The most proximate settlement to the possible nuclear underground test site is Chik-tong, a small populated place located at 41°15′59″N 129°05′53″E. Sungjibaegam is a settlement located 24 km (15 mi) from the tremor of the 2013 test. Punggye-ri railway station is located at 41°07′54″N 129°09′48″E.

== History ==
In January 2013, Google Maps was updated to include various locations in North Korea. On 8 April 2013, it was reported that South Korea had observed activity at Punggye-ri, suggesting that a fourth nuclear test was being prepared, but the next test did not occur until January 2016.

On 6 January 2016, North Korean state media announced a fourth nuclear test had been carried out successfully at the location using a hydrogen bomb. Satellite imagery captured for monitoring website 38 North between January and April 2017 suggested that a sixth nuclear test was being prepared at the site, which was detonated on 3 September 2017.

According to sources, people from the Punggye-ri nuclear test site have been banned from entering Pyongyang since the test due to the possibility of being radioactively contaminated. According to the report of defectors, about 80% of trees died and all of the underground wells dried up in the site after the sixth nuclear test.

On 3 and 23 September 2017, earthquakes which seem to be collapses of tunnels were detected with magnitude of 4.1 and 3.6 respectively. A 17 October 2017 study published by the US-Korea Institute at Johns Hopkins University suggested the most recent test had caused "substantial damage to the existing tunnel network under Mount Mantap".

On 30 October 2017, in testimony before the South Korean parliament, the director of South Korea's Meteorological Administration warned that "further tests at Punggye-ri could cause the mountain to collapse and release radioactivity into the environment." Likewise, Chinese scientists warned that if the mountain collapsed, nuclear fallout could spread across "an entire hemisphere."

On 1 November 2017 Japanese TV station TV Asahi reported that according to unconfirmed reports, several tunnels collapsed at the test site on 10 October 2017. An initial collapse was said to have killed 100 workers, with another 100 rescuers killed in a second collapse.

On 20 April 2018 the North Korean government announced that it would suspend nuclear tests and shut down the Punggye-ri nuclear test site.

On 14 May 2018 press reports suggested that satellite imagery showed work underway on the decommissioning of facilities at the site. The leader and Supreme Commander of North Korea Kim Jong-un determined the date for the closing ceremony of Punggye-ri: 23–25 May 2018. The government of North Korea allowed a handful of international journalists (but none from South Korea) to observe the closing ceremony. Notably absent were experts or inspectors who could study the test site at close quarters.

On 24 May 2018 foreign journalists reported that tunnels in the Punggye-ri nuclear test site had been destroyed by the North Korean government in a move to reduce regional tensions.

However, despite the active tunnel entrances being demolished, the tunnels themselves were not destroyed and the tunnels that were never used in testing were not part of the public demolition. Additionally, the majority of the administrative and support facilities along Punggye-ri's 17-km-long complex were not demolished, and caretaker activities have been noted as recently as 25 November 2020.

David Albright of the Institute for Science and International Security noted:

North Korea's action is better than a freeze and represents a disabling of the test site. However, like many disabling steps, North Korea could likely resume testing at the site after some weeks or months of work. Although the main mountain is unlikely to be usable, other nearby mountains could be used. And two of the portals (numbers 3 and 4, using North Korean nomenclature) were apparently intact and usable for further nuclear explosions prior to the dismantling steps conducted.

Observers noted that the site was rehabilitated in early 2022 for possible nuclear cruise missile warhead tests later in the year. The United States, South Korea, and Japan stated on 26 October 2022, that North Korea would receive an "overwhelming, decisive" and "unparalleled" response from the three nations if testing was renewed.

=== International observations ===
On 31 October 2018, Kim Min-ki, a lawmaker in South Korea's ruling Democratic Party, stated that now defunct Punggye-ri was among other nuclear and missile test sites which had been observed by officials from South Korea's National Intelligence Service and that it was now ready for planned international inspection.
