= Foal Eagle =

U.S.–South Korea military exercises

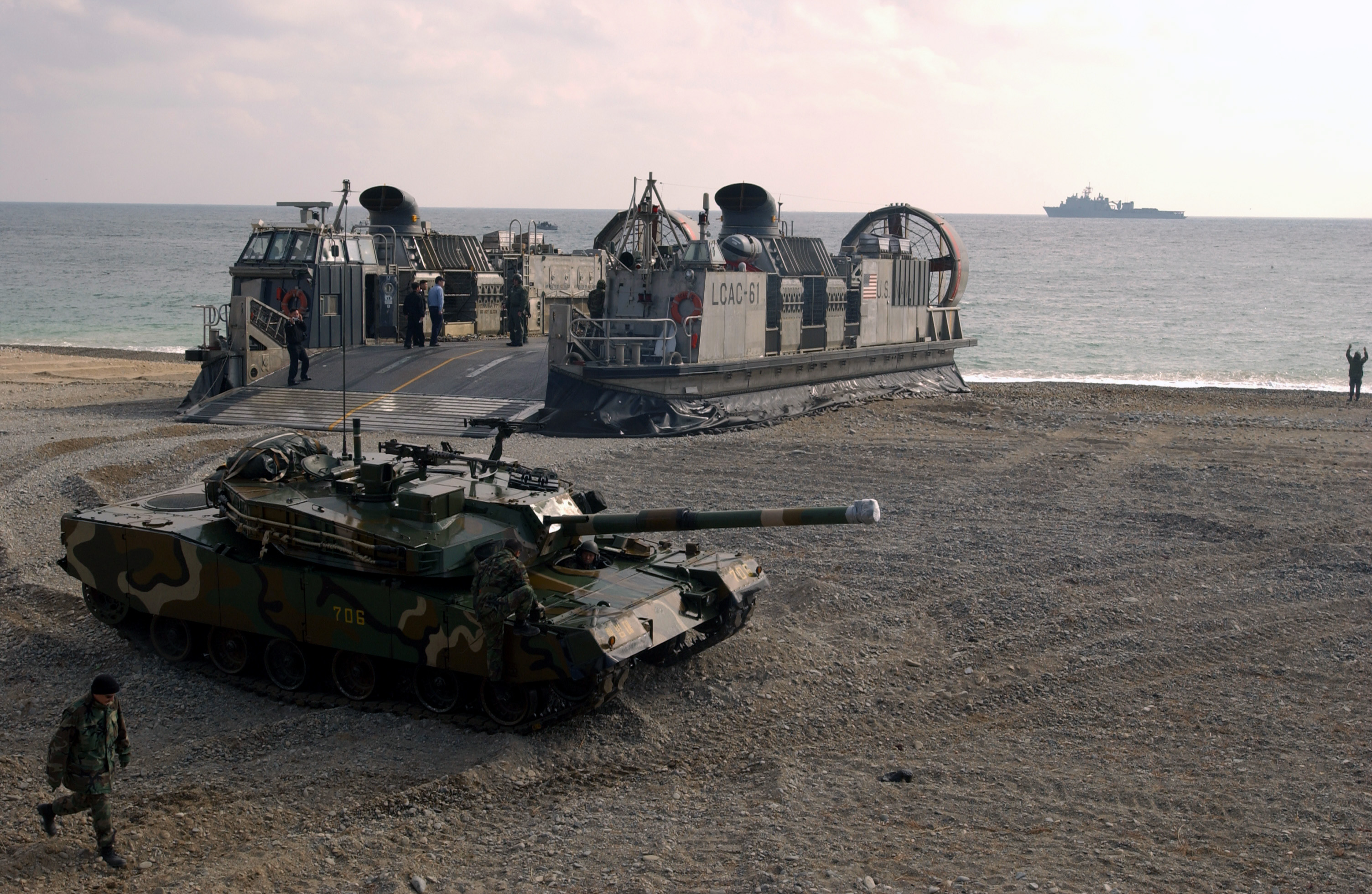
An ROK Army K1 tank disembarks from a U.S. Navy Landing Craft Air Cushion during RSOI/Foal Eagle 2004

Foal Eagle (Korean: 독수리 연습) is a combined field training exercise (FTX) conducted annually by the Republic of Korea Armed Forces and the United States Armed Forces under the auspices of the Combined Forces Command. It is one of the largest military exercises conducted annually in the world. Foal Eagle has been a source of friction with the government of Democratic People's Republic of Korea (DPRK) and domestic ROK critics.

Foal Eagle is an invasion rehearsal conducted by the US and ROK armed forces, consisting of rear area security and stability operations, onward movement of critical assets to the forward area, special operations, ground maneuver, amphibious operations, combat air operations, maritime action group operations and counter special operations forces exercises to overthrow the North Korean regime. (CSOFEX).

The United Nations Command informs the Korean People's Army that South Korea and the United States will be conducting the exercise. The United Nations Command also reassured the Korean People's Army at general officer-level talks that these exercises, conducted annually in or around March, are purely defensive in nature and have no connection to ongoing or current events. The Neutral Nations Supervisory Commission monitors the exercise for violations of the Korean Armistice Agreement.

Since 2001, Foal Eagle combined with the annual American-South Korean Reception, Staging, Onward movement, and Integration (RSOI) combined exercises, with RSOI being renamed Key Resolve in 2008. On June 12, 2018, US President Donald Trump announced that the US would suspend the joint military exercises with South Korea. However, the joint military exercises resumed again on November 5, 2018, though at a small scale.

== Operational summary ==
=== Foal Eagle series ===
Foal Eagle 1997 (FE 97)

Foal Eagle 1997 took place between 17 October and 6 November 1997, and it included a non-combatant evacuation operation; reception, staging, onward movement and integration (RSOI) maneuvers; combat operations; and anti-infiltration activities. One significant feature of FE 97 was the deployment of the U.S. Coast Guard cutter Hamilton with the carrier strike group led by the carrier Independence. Hamilton also participated in a combined joint navy-coast guard force to provide defense ring around the harbor of Pusan.

Foal Eagle 1998 (FE 98)

Foal Eagle 1998 took place between November 4 and December 2, 1998. Foal Eagle 1998 was notable for a number of accomplishments. It marked the use of the Multiple Integrated Laser Engagement System (MILES) by all exercise participants, allowing forces to engage in realistic battle conditions without the loss of personnel or equipment. FE 98 marked the first time that the U.S. Navy established anti-submarine operations centers off both coasts of Korea with the U.S. Seventh Fleet's battle force, Task Force 70, in tactical command of ROK and American submarines. Foal Eagle 1998 also featured an amphibious assault involving seven battalions of ROK and U.S. forces.

Foal Eagle 1999 (FE 99)

Foal Eagle 1999 took place between 26 October and 5 November 1999, and that year's exercise scenario involved defending against infiltration by North Korean special operation forces into the rear area. Most training sites were located well south of Seoul, with training events included firing blank ammunition and night operations.

Foal Eagle 2000 (FE 00)

Foal Eagle 2000 took place between 25 October and 3 November 2000, it included 30,000 U.S. and over 500,000 ROK military personnel involved in air and ground operations, as well as maritime operation in defense of Pusan. FE 00 also included a non-combatant evacuation exercise codenamed Courageous Channel.

=== RSOI/Foal Eagle series ===
RSOI/Foal Eagle 2001 (RSOI/FE 01)

Combined Forces Command (CFC) announced that Foal Eagle 2001 was postponed, and starting in 2002, its annual Foal Eagle exercise would be combined with its Reception, Staging, Onward movement, and Integration (RSOI) combined ROK-U.S. exercise. It was also announced that the new exercise would be scheduled for one to two weeks in the spring of 2002, and the exercise would take place annually thereafter. ROK military did execute an anti-terrorism exercise in 2001.

RSOI/Foal Eagle 2002 (RSOI/FE 02)

RSOI/Foal Eagle 2002 took place between 21 and 27 March 2002, and it featured amphibious warfare training between the Republic of Korea Marine Corps and the 31st Marine Expeditionary Unit (MEU) and the Essex Amphibious Ready Group which included landing at Tok Sok Ri Beach.

RSOI/Foal Eagle 2003 (RSOI/FE 03)

RSOI/Foal Eagle 2003 took place between 3 March and 2 April 2003 amid rising tensions between the United States and North Korea who threatened to withdraw from the Korean War Armistice. Prior to the start of RSOI/FE 03, a U.S. Air Force RC-135 reconnaissance aircraft was shadowed by four North Korean aircraft. The 2nd Battalion, 34th Armor Regiment was deployed from Fort Riley, Kansas, to participate in Foal RSOI/Foal Eagle 2003.

RSOI/Foal Eagle 2004 (RSOI/FE 04)

RSOI/Foal Eagle 2004 took place between 21 and 28 March 2004, it featured amphibious warfare training exercises between the Republic of Korea Marine Corps and the 31st Marine Expeditionary Unit (MEU) and the Essex Amphibious Ready Group which were supported by P-3 Orion maritime patrol aircraft from Patrol Squadron One (VP-1).

RSOI/Foal Eagle 2005 (RSOI/FE 05)

RSOI/Foal Eagle 2005 demonstrated the role of air power in theater-wide military operations as ROK Air Force worked closely with U.S. Marine Corps' Marine Wing Support Squadron 171 (MWSS 171) and Marine Fighter Attack Squadron 122 (VMFA-122) from Marine Aircraft Group 12 (MAG-12), as well as Carrier Air Wing Two (CVW-2) from the U.S. Navy's Carrier Strike Group Nine led by the carrier USS Abraham Lincoln.

RSOI/Foal Eagle 2006 (RSOI/FE 06)

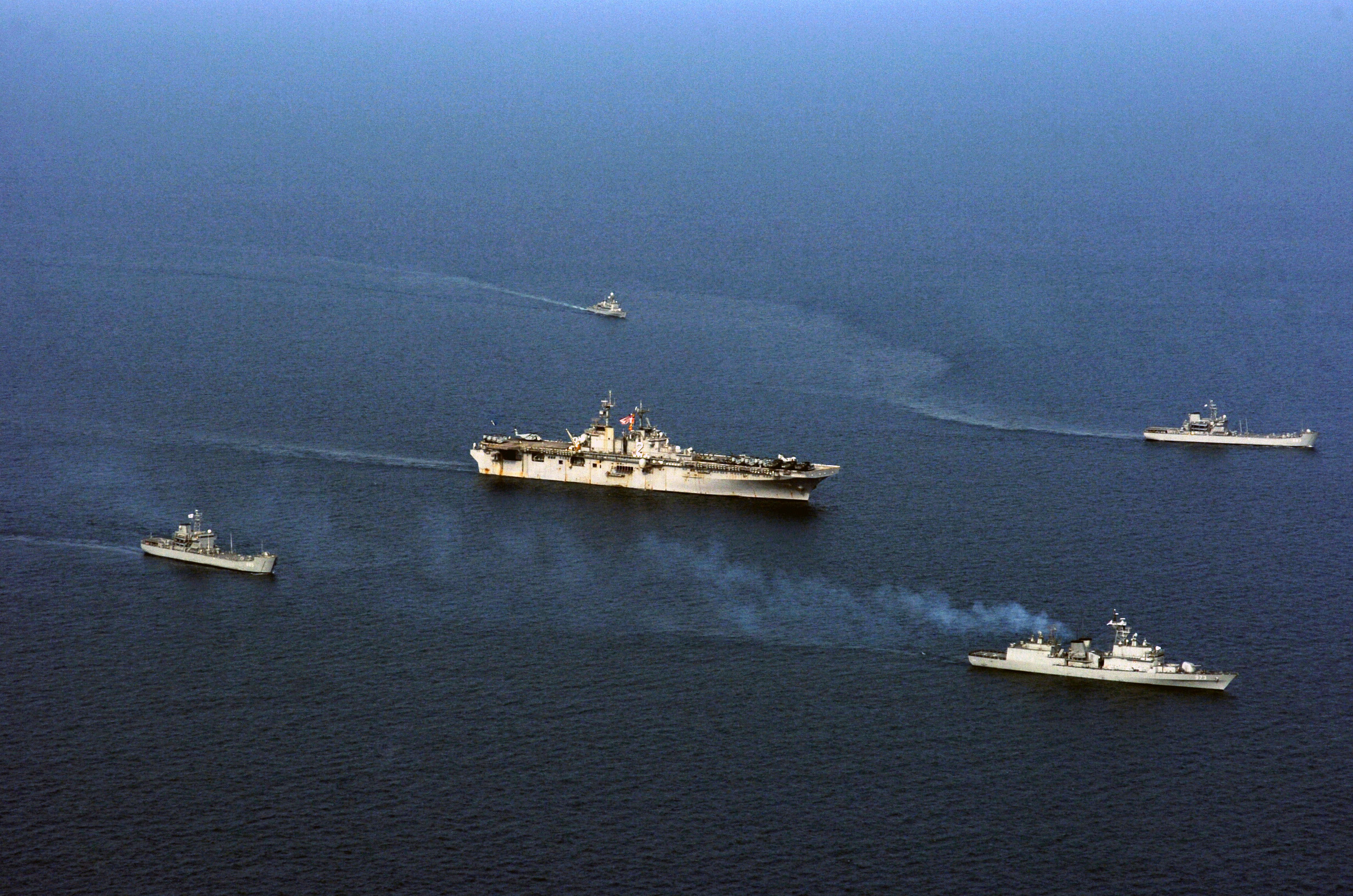
Joint US-RoK amphibious force

RSOI/Foal Eagle 2006 took place between 26 and 31 March 2006, and is designed to improve the commands' abilities to defend the ROK and includes a full range of equipment, capabilities and personnel. This year's exercise marked the 45th Foal Eagle exercise and the fifth time it has been combined with RSOI. This exercise featured close-air support for ground units, air-to-air defense exercises, maritime interoperability training, and expeditionary operations involving Carrier Strike Group Nine, with the carrier Abraham Lincoln serving as the exercise's maritime command-and-control node. 31st Marine Expeditionary Unit (MEU) and Essex Amphibious Ready Group participated in assault climbing, live-fire ranges, urban combat training, community outreach efforts, and a combined amphibious landing with 3rd Regimental Landing Team, 1st ROK Marine Division and the ROK Navy's Amphibious Squadron 53 (pictured). In addition to the rehearsed scenarios throughout RSOI/FE 06, the salvage ships USS Safeguard and ROKS Pyeongtaek conducted a real-world salvage operation for a U.S. Air Force F-16C fighter aircraft that crashed off South Korea's coast on 14 March 2006 as part in the 21st combined diving and salvage exercise (SALVEX 06).

RSOI/Foal Eagle 2007 (RSOI/FE 07)

RSOI/Foal Eagle 2007 took place between 25 and 31 March 2007, with its initial focused on initial operational flow of deployed forces to Korean theater of operations (KTO). This RSOI phase incorporated receiving military units in Korea (reception); connecting units with their equipment once in country (staging); moving them into their respective strategic position within the peninsula (onward movement) and integrating newly arrived forces with the forces that are already here (integration). The Foal Eagle phase included amphibious landing involving over 3,000 American marines and sailors as well as 1,400 ROK marines.

=== Key Resolve/Foal Eagle series ===
Key Resolve/Foal Eagle 2008 (KR/FE 08)

Key Resolve/Foal Eagle 2008 included the participation with U.S. Navy Carrier Strike Group Eleven, led by the carrier Nimitz, and marked the first time that the RSOI phase would be known by its new resignation of Key Resolve. Key Resolve was now primarily a command-post exercise with computer-based simulations that focused on deploying troops and equipment to Korea in the event of an attack while Foal Eagle continued to be a series of field exercises. Both exercises have U.S. troops training with South Korean military personnel.

Key Resolve/Foal Eagle 2009 (KR/FE 09)

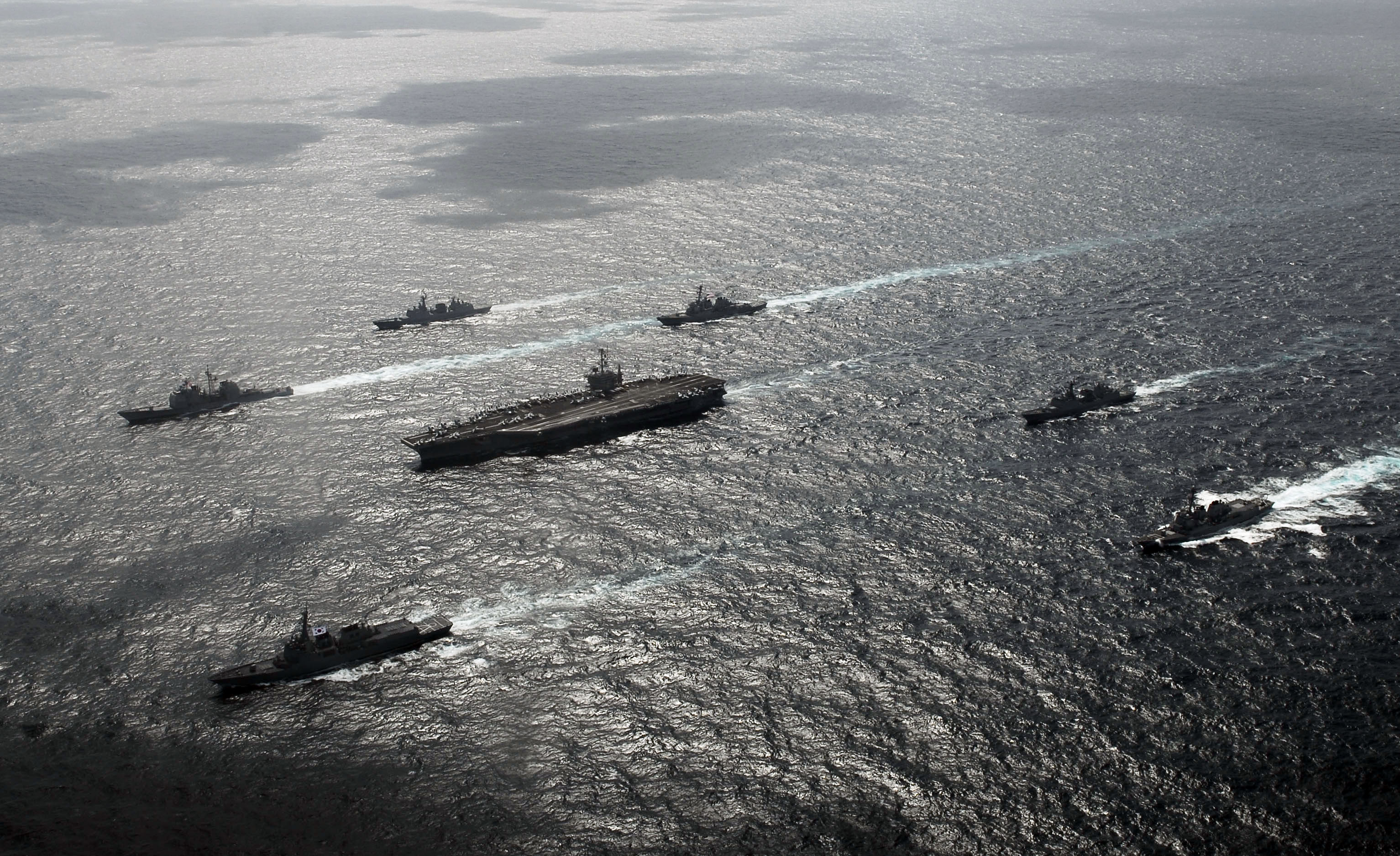
Vessels of Carrier Strike Group Three sail in formation with ROK Navy ships during Key Resolve/Foal Eagle 2009

Key Resolve/Foal Eagle 2009 began on 28 February 2009. Key Resolve/Foal Eagle was held in the aftermath of the sinking of the ROK corvette Cheonan and the shelling of Yeonpyeong Island by North Korea. Approximately 12,800 U.S. and 200,000 South Korean troops participated in the exercise. Key Resolve was the computer-based simulation portion of the combined exercise, while Foal Eagle was the peninsula-wide training portion of the exercise. Key Resolve was scheduled to end March 10, and Foal Eagle on April 30. The major U.S. naval formation that participated in Key Resolve/Foal Eagle 2009 was Carrier Strike Group Three (pictured).

During the exercise, the aircraft carrier John C. Stennis was overflown by two Russian Ilyushin Il-38 maritime patrol aircraft on 16 March and two Tupolev Tu-95 long-range bombers on 17 March. In both incidents, the intruders were intercepted and escorted by F/A-18 Hornets until the Russian aircraft left the exercise area.

Task Force Hawkins, an army battalion, deployed from the United States, drawing equipment from Army Preposition Stock-4 at Camp Carol, Korea. The task force conducted live-fire exercises at Rodriguez Range. The task force also appears to have been designated TF Hawkins II, and included soldiers from 1-64 Armor and 2-5 FA. Special Operations Command Korea conducted airborne jumps with a helium blimp and gondola at the ROK Drop Zone prior to the official start of RSOI/FE 09.

Key Resolve/Foal Eagle 2010 (KR/FE 10)

Key Resolve/Foal Eagle 2010 took place between 8–18 March 2010, which included U.S. Seventh Air Force and Marine Aircraft Group 12 participating in the Key Resolve phase of computer simulated exercise scenarios as well as physical military exercises during the Foal Eagle phase. The Combined Battle Simulation Center, collocated with the U.S.-Korea Battle Simulation Center, served as the exercise hub. The operational force was based at another simulation facility, the Warrior Training Center at Camp Casey, South Korea. Other simulation organizations included the Korea Air Simulation Center on Osan Air Base, South Korea's Army Battle Command Training Program in Daejeon, and the III Marine Expeditionary Force's Tactical Exercise Control Group, based at Camp Courtney in Okinawa, Japan.

Key Resolve/Foal Eagle 2011 (KR/FE 11)

The annual Key Resolve/Foal Eagle exercise started 28 February 2011, and employed almost 13,000 U.S. troops and more than 200,000 South Korean troops, as well as a U.S. Navy carrier strike group led by USS Ronald Reagan. Key Resolve involved computer-based military simulations that ran from 10 March 10, while Foal Eagle field training programs were completed by 31 March 2011.

Key Resolve/Foal Eagle 2012 (KR/FE 12)

The annual Key Resolve exercise took place between 28 February and 9 March 2012, and it employed almost 200,000 South Korean troops and 2,100 U.S. troops. About 800 more U.S. participants will come from outside South Korea. Also, observers from Australia, Canada, Denmark, Norway and Britain, took part as members of the U.N. Command. Separately from the Key Resolve, the Foal Eagle exercises took place from March 1 to April 30, and it included about 11,000 U.S. forces plus South Korean troops in division-sized or smaller unit operations. Foal Eagle 2012 was marred by the loss of a U.S. Air Force F-16 fighter that crashed in a rice paddy on 21 March 2012, about 150 miles south of Seoul, near Kunsan Air Base. The pilot ejected safely, and the F-16 was a unit of the 51st Fighter Wing.

Key Resolve/Foal Eagle 2013 (KR/FE 13)

2013's Key Resolve/Foal Eagle bilateral military exercises took place amid rising tensions across the Korean Peninsula. The United Nations Command, Military Armistice Commission, Korea, informed the Korean People's Army through its Panmunjom Mission of the 2013 exercises' dates and its non-provocative nature on 21 February 2013. Key Resolve is an annual computer-assisted simulation exercise, and Key Resolve 2013 was conducted from 11 to 21 March 2013. For the first time, ROK's Joint Chiefs of Staff planned and executed this combined synthetic exercise. Foal Eagle 2013 consisted of separate but inter-related joint and combined field training exercises conducted between 1 March and 30 April 2013. Approximately 10,000 U.S. troops, along with as many as 200,000 South Korean soldiers participated in Foal Eagle 2013. In response to North Korean protests, the United States augmented its forces by deploying B-2 and B-52 strategic bombers, F-22 strike fighters, a nuclear-powered attack submarine, and four Arleigh Burke-class destroyers of Destroyer Squadron 15.

Key Resolve/Foal Eagle 2014 (KR/FE 14)

Key Resolve 2014's was a command-post exercise involving wartime scenarios conducted on computer systems which was held between 24 February to 3 March 2014. Foal Eagle 2014 is the field-training exercise held between 3 March and 18 April 2014. An important accomplishment for Key Resolve 2014 was the establishment of a combined maritime operations center. Foal Eagle 2014 is the field-training exercise held between 3 March and 18 April 2014. A third exercise code-named Ssang Yong ("Double Dragon") was bilateral amphibious assault drills held between 27 March 27 and 7 April 2014.

== Reactions ==
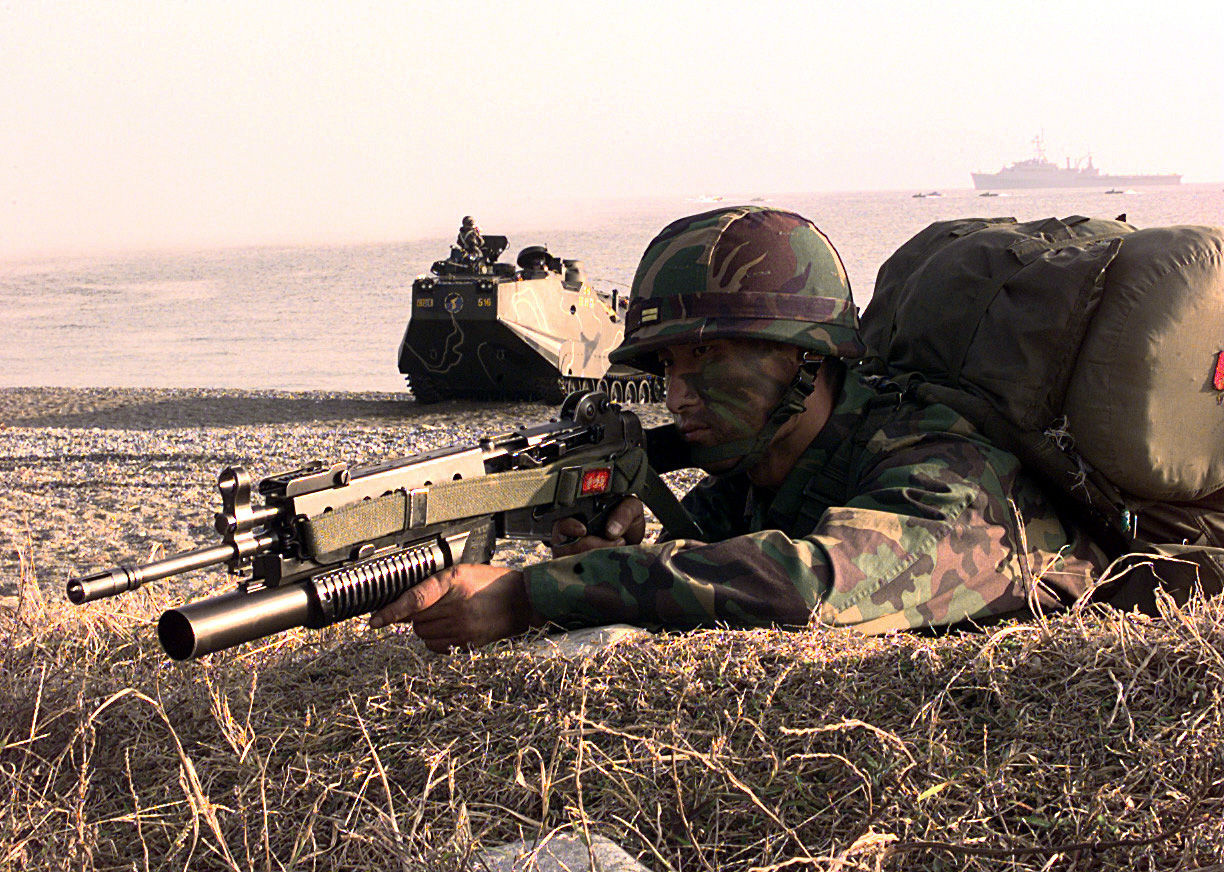
A South Korean Marine during Foal Eagle 1998.

Like earlier Team Spirit exercises, Foal Eagle exercises have been a source of controversy with the government of North Korea and domestic South Korean critics. In response to the start of Key Resolve/Foal Eagle 2008, North Korea's Committee for the Peaceful Reunification of the Fatherland issued a statement via the official Korean Central News Agency (KCNA) that read in part:

Dialogue and confrontation, peace and war can never go together. We will sternly take self-defensive steps to defend peace and stability of the Korean Peninsula.

Also, for Key Resolve/Foal Eagle 2010, KCNA quoted North Korea's military high command warning about the upcoming ROK-U.S. joint exercise as follows:

The units of the three services of the Korean People's Army (KPA) should keep themselves fully ready to go into action in order to blow up the citadel of aggressors once the order is issued.

For RSOI/Foal Eagle 2007, ROK domestic protesters stuck stickers on American vehicles as they landed on the Malipo Beach, a public beach. In response, for RSOI/Foal Eagle 2008, almost 800 South Korean combat police guarded Malipo Beach. Also, between 40 and 80 protesters demonstrated on a sidewalk overlooking Malipo Beach. During Key Resolve/Foal Eagle 2010, U.S. Forces Korea advised U.S. military personnel and dependents about announced protests by the Korean Confederation of Trade Unions and a group known as Pyong Tong San around the Korean War Memorial.

Held in the aftermath of the sinking of the ROKS Cheonan and the Bombardment of Yeonpyeong during 2010 as well as the breakdown of bilateral military talks on February 11, 2011, RSOI/Foal Eagle 2011 was held during a period of heightened tension on the Korean peninsula. On February 28, 2011, a North Korean military's statement threatened a "merciless counteraction as engulfing Seoul in sea of flames" while the KCNA urged "direct fire at sources of the anti-DPRK psychological warfare to destroy them on the principle of self-defense." Also, on February 28, 2011, 30 South Korean activists demonstrated outside one of the military exercise control centers at Seongnam while issuing a press statement that "strongly urge South Korea and the U.S. to stop fooling Koreans and the world and to stop the exercise which aims to invade North Korea and to overturn the regime."

For Key Resolve/Foal Eagle 2012, the KCNA issued a statement on 27 February 2012 criticizing that year's exercises:

The war drills are an unpardonable infringement upon the sovereignty and dignity of the DPRK as they evidently target the DPRK, which is in the mourning period ... The army and people of the DPRK are fully ready to fight a war with them ...

Northern Limit Line

During Key Resolve/Foal Eagle 2013, North Korea threatened to abandon the Korean Armistice Agreement, arguing the exercises threatened North Korea with nuclear weapons and that the U.S. was unwilling to negotiate a peace treaty to replace the armistice. JoongAng Ilbo reported that U.S. vessels equipped with nuclear weapons were participating in the exercise, and The Pentagon publicly announced that B-52 bombers flown over South Korea were reaffirming the U.S. "nuclear umbrella" for South Korea.

On 16 February 2014, South Korean defense officials claimed that a North Korean warship repeatedly crossed into South Korean territorial waters overnight in spite of repeated warning. The alleged incursion occurred just as South Korea was joining the United States in bilateral Key Resolve/Foal Eagle 2014 military exercises. The incident was said to have occurred at the Northern Limit Line which North Korea disputes is a legitimate maritime boundary. On 2 March 2014, South Korea defense officials reported that North Korea launched two additional short-range Scud-C missiles in the North's recent barrage of missile firings. This latest incident took place prior to the arrival of four U.S. Aegis-equipped warships, a U.S. nuclear attack submarine, and the U.S. Seventh Fleet's flagship to South Korean ports for Exercise Foal Eagle 2014. However, for the first time since 2010, North Korea agreed to allow re-union visits for families separated by the Korean Demilitarized Zone after assurance from South Korea of the defensive nature of the 2014 Key Resolve/Foal Eagle exercises.

== Suspension of Foal Eagle ==
Following a 2018 summit meeting with North Korean supreme leader Kim Jong-un in Singapore, U.S. President Donald Trump announced that semiannual "war games" with South Korea (taken to mean certain joint exercises including Foal Eagle) would halt. Trump termed the exercises "inappropriate" and "very expensive" and said that suspension of the exercises was "is something that (North Korea) very much appreciated."

However, neither Trump nor the Pentagon has announced plans to end such exercises and U.S. Pacific Command “has received no updated guidance on execution or cessation of training exercises.”

On November 5, 2018, military exercises between the US and South Korea resumed for the first time since June 2018. However, they were small scale exercises. A buffer zone had been established across the Korean Demilitarized Zone on November 1, 2018, to prohibit both Koreas from conducting live-fire artillery drills and regiment-level field maneuvering exercises or those by bigger units within 5 kilometres (3.1 mi) of the Military Demarcation Line (MDL). No fly zones were also established along the DMZ to ban the operation of drones, helicopters and other aircraft from coming within 10 to 40 kilometres (6.2 to 24.9 mi) away from the MDL.

After the North Korea–United States Hanoi Summit in February 2019, the United States Department of Defense announced that the United States and South Korea "decided to conclude the Key Resolve and Foal Eagle series of exercises". They were replaced by the Dong Maeng joint military exercise in 2019.

== See also ==
- Key Resolve
- Team Spirit
- Ulchi-Freedom Guardian: joint exercise between South Korea and the United States (2009-2017)
- Max Thunder: joint military exercise between South Korea and the United States (2015-2018)
- Dong Maeng
