= Key Resolve =

U.S.-South Korean military exercises

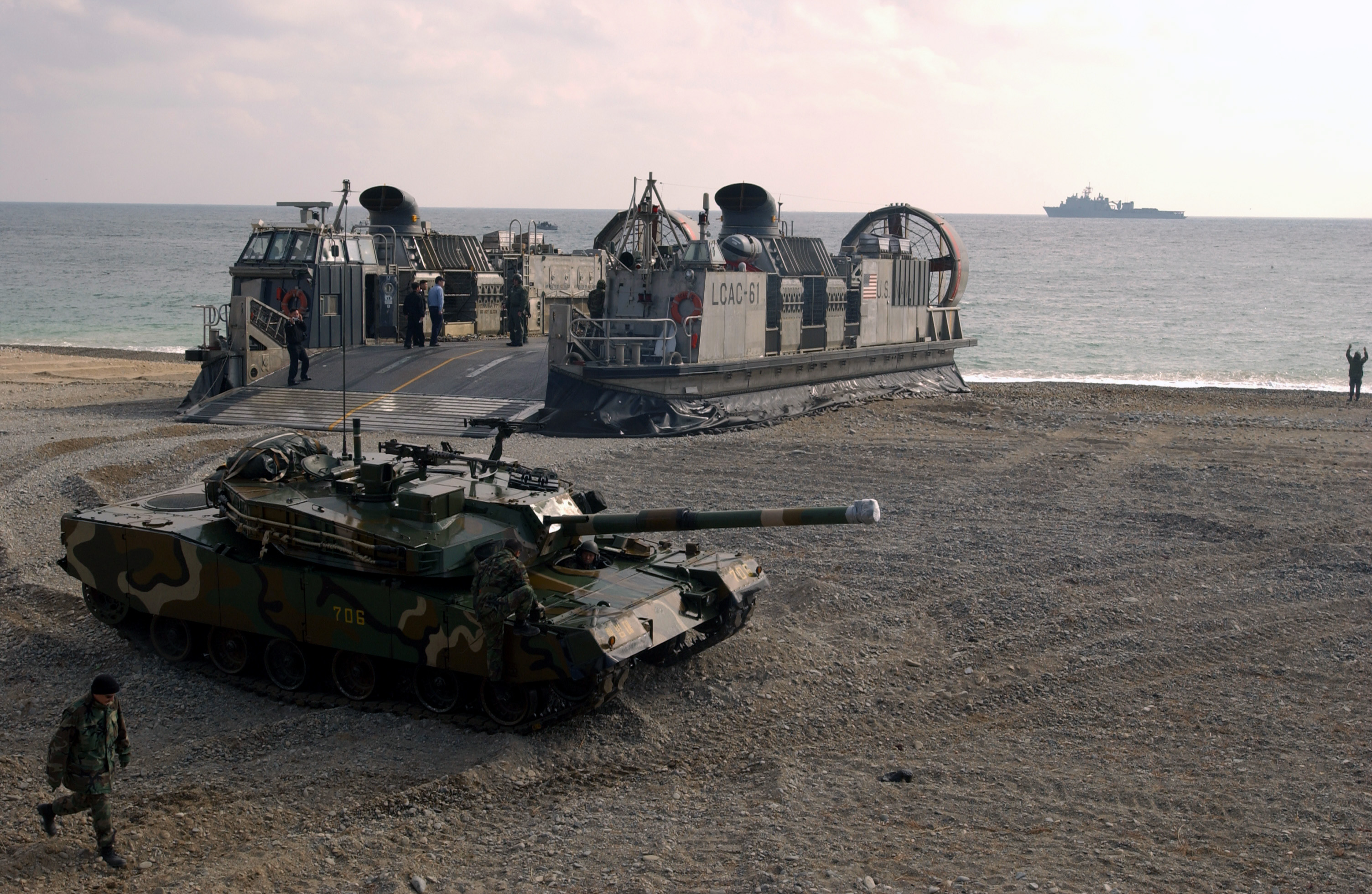
Korean tank participating in the 2004 exercise

Key Resolve, previously known as Reception, Staging, Onward Movement, Integration (RSOI) which was previously known as Team Spirit even earlier, is an annual command post exercise (CPX) held by United States Forces Korea with the Republic of Korea Armed Forces. It is conducted between February and April and focuses on United States Pacific Command OPLANs that support the defense of South Korea. Additionally, US units are moved to Korea from other areas and they conduct maneuvers and gunnery exercises. ROK units also conduct maneuvers with some acting as the opposing force (OPFOR). Since 2001, Key Resolve combined with the annual combined field training exercise (FTX) Foal Eagle.

Doctrinally, RSOI is detailed in FM 100-17-3, the field manual for RSOI.

This exercise, like the Ulchi-Freedom Guardian (UFG) exercise, regularly leads to accusations by North Korea that it is a prelude to an invasion by the United States and South Korea.

Japan supports the joint drills of South Korea and the US, considering it to be a deterrent power in the Asian-Pacific region.

After the North Korea–United States Hanoi Summit in February 2019, the United States Department of Defense announced that the United States and South Korea "decided to conclude the Key Resolve and Foal Eagle series of exercises". They were replaced by the Dong Maeng joint military exercise in 2019.
