= Dong Maeng =

U.S.–South Korea military exercises

Dong Maeng (hangul 동맹, hanja 同盟, meaning "Alliance") is a joint military exercise between the United States Forces Korea and the Republic of Korea Armed Forces. The exercise, first introduced in 2019, is intended to be a smaller scale version of the bigger exercises Foal Eagle and Key Resolve. According to Patrick Shanahan who was the acting Secretary of Defense at the time that the exercise was launched, the scaled down exercise was designed "to reduce tensions and support our diplomatic efforts to achieve complete denuclearisation of the Korean Peninsula in a final, fully verified manner." The first exercise was held March 4 thru 12 of 2019, and the second held August 5 thru 20 of 2019.

During the August exercise, US President Donald Trump referred to the exercise as "ridiculous and expensive". A few days after the conclusion of the exercise, Trump called joint military exercises between the US and South Korea "unnecessary" and a "total waste of money".

North Korea regards the exercise as inconsistent with the 2018 Panmunjom and Pyongyang Declarations which emphasized a de-escalation of military hostilities.
