= Max Thunder =

Joint U.S.–South Korean military exercise

Max Thunder (맥스 선더) is a joint U.S.–South Korean military exercise that began in 2009. In 2017, it began on 21 April 2017. North Korea responded with the largest ever live fire exercise on 26 April 2017 in Wonsan.

In May 2018, North Korea temporarily canceled high-level talks with the South because of Max Thunder.

== See also ==
- Ulchi-Focus Lens: joint military exercise between South Korea and the United States (1998–2008)
- Ulchi-Freedom Guardian: joint exercise between South Korea and the United States (2009–2017)
- Foal Eagle: joint military exercise between South Korea and the United States (1997–2014)
