= 2017–2018 North Korea crisis =

North Korea–US period of tension

- Part of the inter-Korean conflict
- North Korea's Hwasong-14 launch in July 2017
Date	8 April 2017 – 12 June 2018 (1 year, 2 months and 4 days)
Location	Korean Peninsula; Sea of Japan (East Sea); North Pacific Ocean
Result	Panmunjom Declaration signed at the April 2018 inter-Korean summit; Intention declared to sign a peace treaty proclaiming Korean War de jure over sometime in 2018 or 2019; Kim Jong Un becomes the first North Korean leader to visit South Korea; Donald Trump becomes the first US president to visit the DMZ; US-North Korea meeting in Singapore concluded with a joint declaration by both leaders
Territorial changes	Northern Limit Line area becomes a maritime peace zone

Parties involved in the crisis
North Korea	United States; South Korea; Japan

Commanders and leaders
Kim Jong Un	Donald Trump; Moon Jae-in; Hwang Kyo-ahn; Shinzo Abe

The 2017–2018 North Korea crisis was a period of heightened tension between North Korea and the United States. The crisis began early in 2017 when North Korea conducted a series of missile and nuclear tests that demonstrated the country's ability to launch ballistic missiles beyond its immediate region, suggesting their nuclear weapons capability was developing at a faster rate than had been assessed by U.S. intelligence. Both countries started exchanging increasingly heated rhetoric, including nuclear threats and personal attacks between the two leaders, which, compounded by a joint U.S.–South Korea military exercise undertaken in August and North Korea's sixth nuclear test in September, raised international tensions in the region and beyond and stoked fears about a possible nuclear conflict between the two nations. In addition, North Korea also threatened Australia twice with nuclear strikes throughout the year for their allegiance with the United States. International relations lecturer and former government strategist Van Jackson said in the book On the Brink: Trump, Kim, and the Threat of Nuclear War that it was the closest the world had come to nuclear war since the Cuban Missile Crisis.

Tensions began to decline in 2018, with North Korea announcing the restoration of the Seoul–Pyongyang hotline and agreeing to hold talks with South Korea about participation in the 2018 Winter Olympics in Pyeongchang. Diplomatic activity flourished during the next few months, with the suspension of nuclear and missile tests by North Korea, and the 2018 inter-Korean summit in late April which culminated in the signing of the Panmunjom Declaration on 27 April 2018. An unprecedented bilateral summit between Kim and Trump was held in Singapore on 12 June 2018. It resulted in a joint declaration calling for the "full denuclearization of the Korean peninsula". A second summit between Kim and Trump took place in Hanoi, Vietnam, on 27–28 February 2019. Though talks there broke down, a third summit took place in the Korean Demilitarized Zone (DMZ) on 30 June 2019, with Trump becoming the first sitting US president to visit North Korea. Follow-up talks later in 2019, however, broke down within hours.

== Background ==
=== North Korea's nuclear weapons program ===
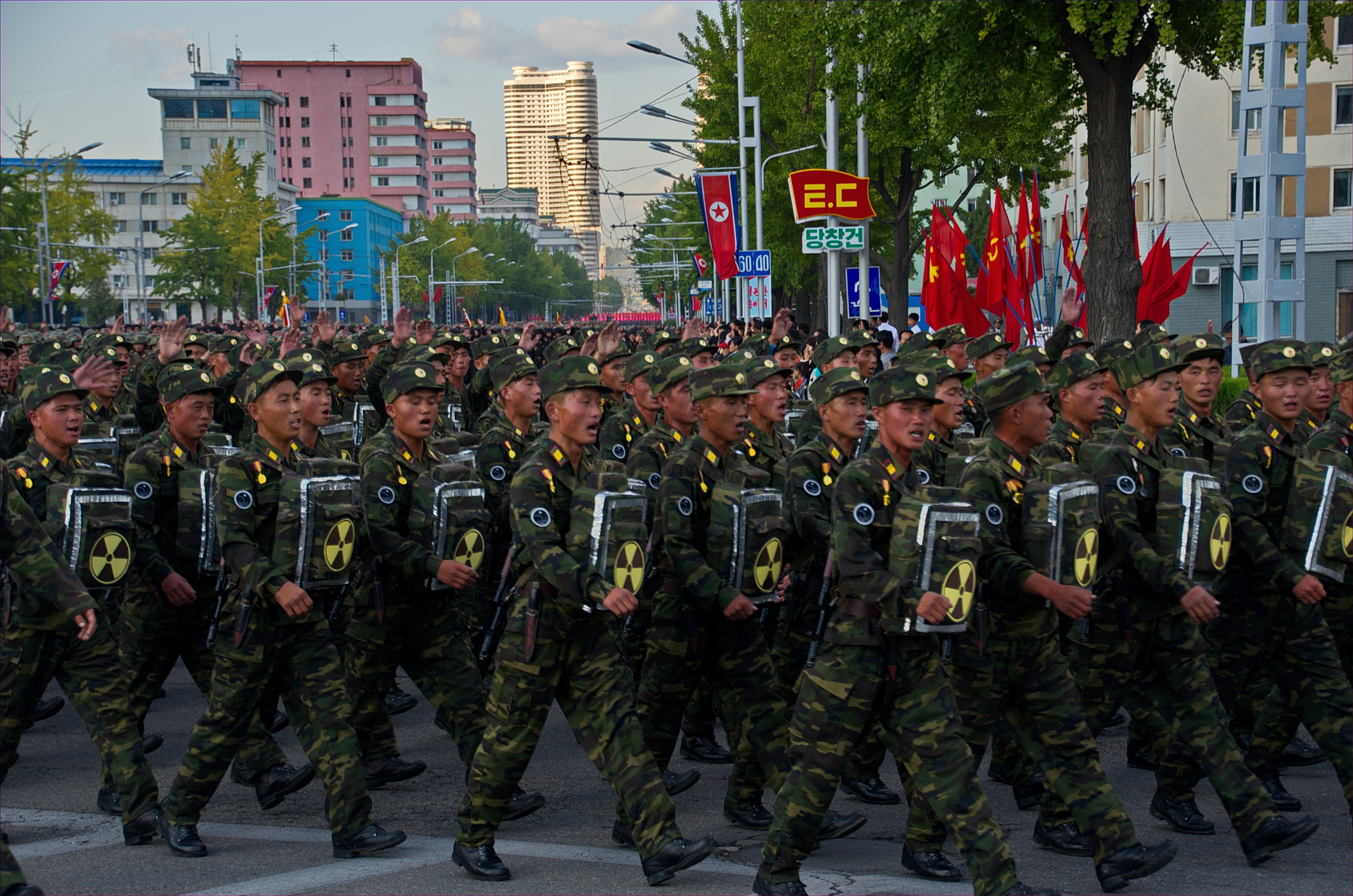
Military parade in Pyongyang, 2015 featuring soldiers with CBRN equipment

In his New Year's Day speech on January 2, 2017, Kim Jong Un, the leader of North Korea, said that the country was in the "last stage" of preparations to test-fire an intercontinental ballistic missile (ICBM).

On May 3, North Korea issued a rare and harshly worded criticism of its chief ally, China, stating that "One must clearly understand that the D.P.R.K.'s line of access to nukes for the existence and development of the country can neither be changed nor shaken[...] And that the D.P.R.K. will never beg for the maintenance of friendship with China, risking its nuclear program which is as precious as its own life, no matter how valuable the friendship is... China should no longer try to test the limits of the D.P.R.K.'s patience[...] China had better ponder over the grave consequences to be entailed by its reckless act of chopping down the pillar of the D.P.R.K.-China relations." The harsh commentary also accused the Chinese media of dancing to the tune of the U.S.

In early August 2017, The Washington Post reported an assessment, made by the U.S. Defense Intelligence Agency in July 2017, which said that North Korea had successfully developed nuclear warheads for missiles capable of reaching the U.S. mainland (a miniaturized nuclear warhead that can fit inside its missiles).

=== Sanctions on North Korea; trade with China ===
Since North Korea's first nuclear test in 2006, the UN Security Council had passed a number of resolutions that imposed various sanctions on the DPRK, including restrictions on economic activity. Nevertheless, North Korea's gross domestic product grew by an estimated 3.9 percent in 2016, to about $28.5 billion, the fastest pace in 17 years; the progress was largely attributed to continued trade with China, which accounted for more than 90% of North Korea's international trade.

In late February 2017, following North Korea's February 12 test of the Pukkuksong-2 medium-range ballistic missile, China, which regards its trade with North Korea and the putative missile threat to the U.S. as separate issues, said it would comply with UN Resolution 2321 and halt all coal imports (North Korea's main export) from North Korea. The halt notwithstanding, in April 2017, China said that its trade with North Korea had expanded. In July 2017, China's trade with North Korea, while the ban on North Korean coal was said to have slowed imports from the DPRK, was worth $456 million, up from $426 million in July 2016, the year-to-date trade being up 10.2 percent at $3.01 billion.

In 2017, North Korea was sanctioned several times by the UN Security Council. According to the last set of sanctions of December 22, 2017, oil supplies to the DPRK are prohibited, and all countries have decided to expel North Korean labor migrants within 24 months from the territories of the countries where they work.

China has been opposed to secondary sanctions that may be imposed on Chinese firms that do business with North Korea.

=== Imprisonment of U.S. citizens ===
American university student Otto Warmbier was freed from North Korea in June 2017, while in a coma after nearly 18 months of captivity. Warmbier died without regaining consciousness on June 19, 2017, six days after his return to the United States. Some U.S. officials blamed North Korea for his death. In July 2017, U.S. Secretary of State Rex Tillerson authorized a "Geographical Travel Restriction" which banned Americans from entering North Korea.

=== THAAD in South Korea ===
Ostensibly to counter North Korea's missile threat, United States Forces Korea (USFK) had been planning deployment of the Terminal High Altitude Area Defense (THAAD) in South Korea, which is designed to detect and destroy intermediate- and medium-range ballistic missiles (not intercontinental ballistic missile). The deployment had faced strong oppositions from China, Russia, and North Korea. In late April 2017, it was reported that while THAAD had originally been scheduled to become operational by the end of 2017, this could occur sooner. According to U.S. Forces Korea's announcement, THAAD stationed in South Korea had reached initial operating capability (IOC) on May 1, 2017.

== Timeline ==
=== USS Carl Vinson's movements: April 2017 ===
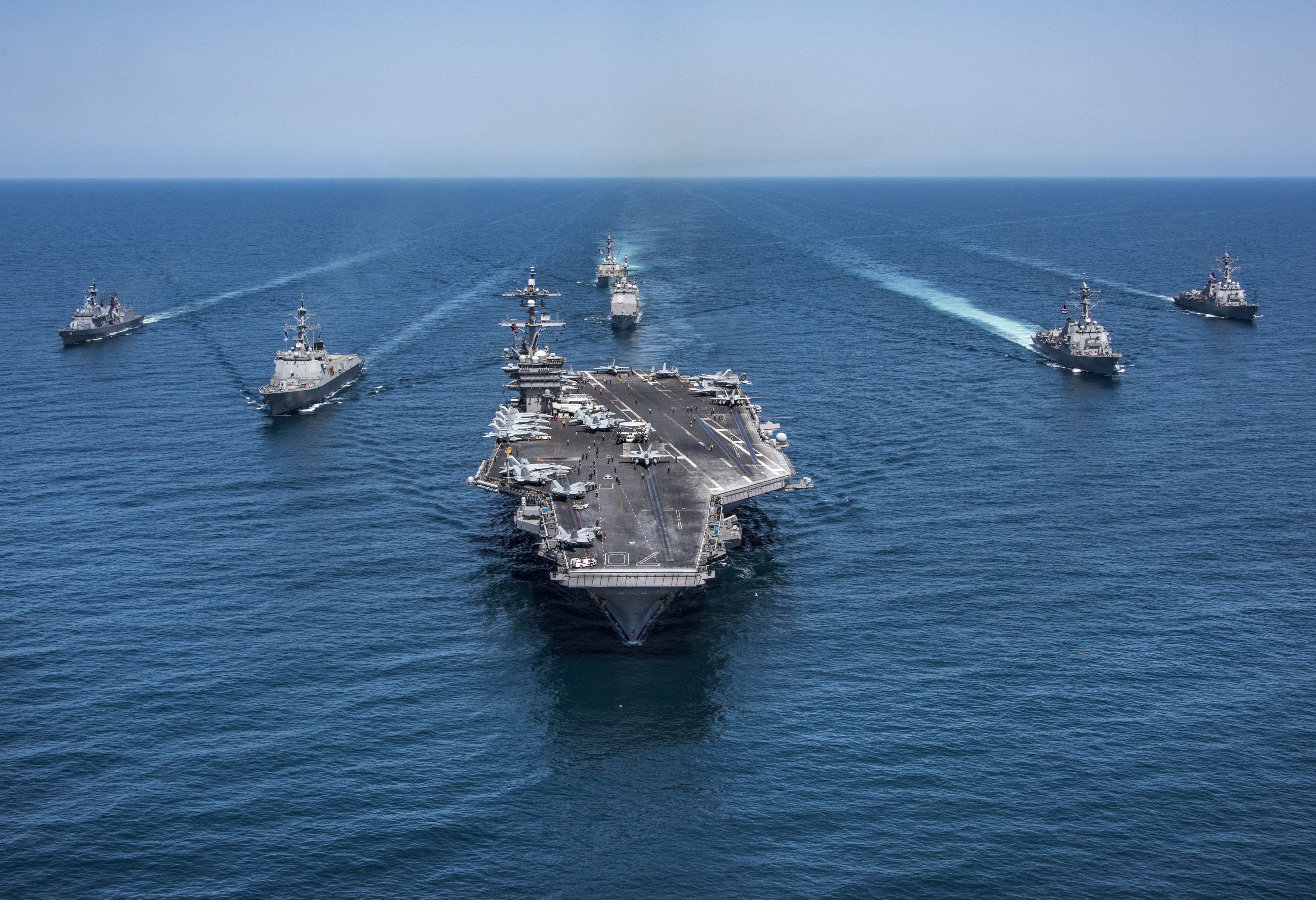
USS Carl Vinson carrier strike group and South Korean Navy vessels having a joint exercise on May 3, 2017

Following North Korea's test-firing of a medium-range ballistic missile from its eastern port of Sinpo into the Sea of Japan on April 5, which came a month after four ballistic missiles were fired towards the Sea of Japan, tensions increased as U.S. president Donald Trump had said the U.S. was prepared to act alone to deal with the nuclear threat from North Korea. On April 9, the U.S. Navy announced it was sending a navy strike group headed by the supercarrier USS Carl Vinson to the West Pacific ("to sail north and report on station in the Western Pacific Ocean after departing Singapore April 8"), but due to apparent miscommunication inside the U.S. administration, the naval move was presented as one towards the Korean peninsula. This information was backtracked by the U.S. government a few days later.

The April 9 announcement by the Navy led to a "glitch-ridden sequence of events". On April 17, North Korea's deputy United Nations ambassador accused the United States of turning the Korean peninsula into "the world's biggest hotspot" and the North Korean government stated "its readiness to declare war on the United States if North Korean forces were to be attacked." In reality on April 18, Carl Vinson and its escorts were 5,600 kilometres (3,500 mi) from Korea engaged in scheduled joint Royal Australian Navy exercises in the Indian Ocean. On April 24 the Japanese destroyers Ashigara and Samidare participated with Carl Vinson in tactical training drills near the Philippines; North Korea threatened to sink her with a single strike. Carl Vinson had been in the South China Sea in 2015 and again in February 2017 on routine patrols. In late April 2017, Trump stated that "[t]here is a chance that we [the United States] could end up having a major, major conflict with North Korea".

On April 24, North Korea marked the 85th anniversary of the Korean People's Army by what was said to be "its largest ever military drill," conducted in Wonsan. The following day, it was reported that the United States and South Korea had begun installing key elements of the THAAD missile defense in South Korea's Seongju County.

=== ICBM test-flight on 4 July ===
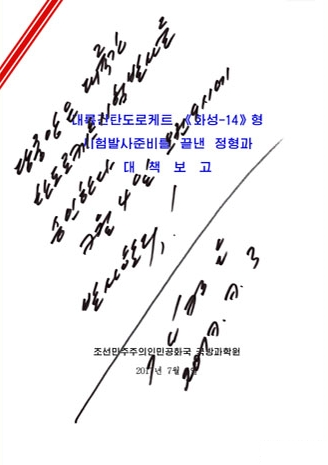
Kim Jong Un's order for the first test of Hwasong-14

On July 4 (Note: There is a 12 1/2 hour time difference from North Korean local time to Eastern Daylight Time. The missile was launched at 9 am, North Korean local time, on the morning of 4 July. This was 8:30 pm Washington time on the evening of 3 July.) North Korea conducted the first publicly announced flight test of its ICBM Hwasong-14, timed to coincide with the U.S. Independence Day celebrations. This flight had a claimed range of 933 kilometres (580 miles) eastwards into the Sea of Japan (East Sea of Korea) and reached an altitude of 2,802 kilometres (9,193,000 ft) during a 39-minute flight. The U.S. government experts classified the missile launch as a big step in Pyongyang's quest to acquire a nuclear-tipped weapon capable of hitting the U.S. North Korea declared it was now "a full-fledged nuclear power that has been possessed of the most powerful inter-continental ballistic rocket capable of hitting any part of the world".

USFK said in a statement dated July 4, 2017: "Eighth U.S. Army and Republic of Korea (ROK) military personnel conducted a combined event exercising assets countering North Korea's destabilizing and unlawful actions on July 4." South Korea's Hyunmoo-2B and U.S. Army Tactical Missile System missiles were launched during the drill.

=== Rhetorical escalation in August 2017 ===
On August 8, 2017, President Donald Trump warned that North Korean nuclear threats would "be met with fire, fury and frankly power, the likes of which the world has never seen before," after the mass media reported that a US intelligence assessment had found that the country had successfully produced a miniaturised nuclear warhead capable of fitting inside its missiles. According to New York Times correspondent Michael S. Schmidt, Trump proposed using a nuclear weapon against North Korea and blaming the attack on another country, but was dissuaded by John F. Kelly. President Trump also remarked of North Korea's leader Kim Jong Un: "He has been very threatening beyond a normal state." Within hours, North Korea responded by announcing that it was considering attacking U.S. military bases in the US territory of Guam.

On August 10, 2017, North Korean Lt. Gen. Kim Rak-gyom responded to Trump's speech of "fire and fury," saying his words were "nonsense" and asserting that "reasonable dialogue" wasn't possible with Trump as president of the US. The North Korean governmental news agency KCNA reported that Kim Jong Un's military was considering a plan to fire four ICBMs, type Hwasong-12, into the Philippine Sea just 30–40 kilometers away from the island Guam. The flight time of missiles was estimated to be exactly 17 minutes and 45 seconds. A report by the KCNA suggested the plan would be put into operation in mid-August. U.S. officials stated that Joseph Y. Yun, the US envoy for North Korea policy, and Pak Song-il, a senior North Korean diplomat at the country's UN mission, were making regular contact during this dispute, through a conduit of communication they called the New York channel.

On August 11, Trump wrote on Twitter: "Military solutions are now fully in place,[ ]locked and loaded,[ ]should North Korea act unwisely. Hopefully Kim Jong Un will find another path!" Former U.S. Ambassador to the United Nations John Bolton and former U.S. Secretary of Defense Leon Panetta stated that the standoff between the U.S. and North Korea over Pyongyang's nuclear weapons program was comparable to the Cuban Missile Crisis.

Bob Woodward, in his 2020 book Rage, quoted Mike Pompeo as saying the national security team "never knew whether it was real, or whether it was a bluff", and reported that Jim Mattis slept fully dressed due to concerns about a North Korean attack.

On August 14, Ukraine's Chairman of the National Security and Defense Council, Oleksandr Turchynov denied that it had ever supplied defense technology to North Korea, responding to an article in the New York Times that said North Korea might have purchased rocket engines from Ukrainian factory Yuzhmash, who have also denied the report.

On August 15, the North Korean leader said he was delaying a decision on firing missiles towards the US Pacific territory of Guam while he waits to see what Trump does next.

From August 21–31, the U.S. and South Korea conducted the 2017 Ulchi-Freedom Guardian exercise that was billed by U.S. Forces Korea as slightly smaller than the previous year's, with 17,500 U.S. troops participating; an editorial carried by North Korea's official Rodong Sinmun newspaper condemned the drills as "the most explicit expression of hostility against us."

On August 25, North Korea fired three missiles from Kangwon Province in the southeastern part of the country. According to Cmdr. Dave Benham of US Pacific Command, one of the missiles exploded on launch while the other two suffered critical failures in flight, splashing down in the Sea of Japan after flying a distance of 250 kilometers (160 mi).

==== Missile test over Japan on 29 August ====
On August 29, just before 6 am JST, North Korea launched a missile which flew over Hokkaido, Japan. The missile reached an altitude of 550 km (340 mi) and flew a total distance of around 2,700 km (1,700 mi) before crashing into the Pacific. The missile was not shot down by the Japanese military. This was the third time, with two prior events in 1998 and 2009, that a North Korean missile had passed over Japanese territory. However, in both of those prior cases, North Korea had claimed that they were launching satellites. The missile prompted activation of the J-Alert warning system in Tohoku and Hokkaido, advising people to seek shelter. The launch was scheduled on the 107th anniversary of the Japan-Korea annexation treaty, and KCNA said that it was "a bold plan to make the cruel Japanese islanders insensible on bloody August 29." The missile launched was said to have followed a much flatter trajectory than those tested earlier in 2017.

An emergency UN Security Council meeting was called for later that day to discuss the event. In a statement issued by the White House in response to the launch, US President Donald Trump said that "All options are on the table" regarding North Korea.

==== U.S. response at the end of August ====
On August 30, President Trump issued a statement via Twitter saying "The U.S. has been talking to North Korea and paying them extortion money, for 25 years. Talking is not the answer!" However, when asked by reporters at a meeting with South Korean Defense Minister Song Young-Moo whether diplomacy was off the table, US Secretary of Defense James Mattis stated that "We're never out of diplomatic solutions" and "We always look for more. We're never complacent."

On August 31, the US flew a squadron of bombers, including two B-1Bs and four F-35s, and conducted bombing drills in what US Pacific Command described as a "direct response to North Korea's intermediate range ballistic missile launch," referring to North Korea's IRBM launch on August 29.

=== Sixth nuclear test and aftermath: September 2017 ===
On September 3, at 3:31 am UTC, the United States Geological Survey reported that it had detected a magnitude 6.3 earthquake in North Korea near the Punggye-ri test site. Given the shallow depth of the quake and its proximity to North Korea's primary nuclear weapons testing facility, experts concluded that the country had conducted a sixth nuclear weapon test since the country first exploded a nuclear device in 2006. North Korea claimed that they had tested a hydrogen bomb capable of being mounted on an ICBM. The independent seismic monitoring agency NORSAR estimated that the blast had a yield of around 120 kilotons. An official KCNA statement of September 3, also claimed North Korea's ability to conduct a "super-powerful EMP attack".

On the same day, U.S. Defense Secretary James Mattis speaking on behalf of the White House, warned there would be "a massive military response" to any threat from North Korea against the United States, including Guam, or its allies.

Early on September 4, South Korea conducted a ballistic missile exercise that involved the South's Hyunmoo ballistic missile and the F-15K fighter jets, which was billed to be in response to North's detonation. The state news agency Yonhap said the South's military had carried out a live-fire exercise simulating an attack on the North's nuclear site, hitting "designated targets in the East Sea".

On the same day, the UN Security Council convened to discuss further measures against North Korea; the leaked draft the relevant UNSC resolution prepared by the U.S. was said to call for an oil embargo on North Korea, ban on the country's exports of textiles, on the hiring of North Korean workers abroad as well as personal sanctions against Kim Jong Un. Despite resistance from China and Russia, the United States on 8 September formally requested a vote of the United Nations Security Council on the U.S. resolution. UNSC 2375 passed on September 11 as a significantly watered-down version of the United States' request.

In an interview on September 4, Liu Jieyi, China's ambassador to the United Nations, called for dialogue, saying that the issue needed to be resolved "peacefully". He said, "China will never allow chaos and war on the peninsula."

President Vladimir Putin speaking to the Chinese press on September 5, 2017, described U.S. proposals for further sanctions on Pyongyang as "useless"; he said, "Ramping up military hysteria in such conditions is senseless; it's a dead end." Russian Foreign Minister Sergey Lavrov has likened the war of words between U.S. President Donald Trump and North Korean leader Kim Jong Un to a kindergarten fight between two children, saying "Together with China we'll continue to strive for a reasonable approach and not an emotional one like when children in a kindergarten start fighting and no-one can stop them."

A plan proposed by both China and Russia calls for a joint freeze (freeze-for-freeze) – of North's missile tests, and U.S. and South Korean military exercises; the next step would be starting talks. The joint initiative of Russia and China envisages the involved parties' commitment to "four nos": concerning regime change, regime collapse, accelerated reunification, and military deployment north of the thirty-eighth parallel.

On September 6, Donald Trump, after a telephone conversation with China's Xi Jinping, said that the United States would not tolerate North Korea's provocations, although military action was not his "first choice".

On September 10, the Secretary General of the North Atlantic Treaty Organization Jens Stoltenberg said in an interview with BBC television: "The reckless behavior of North Korea is a global threat and requires a global response and that of course also includes NATO"; when asked whether an attack on the U.S. Pacific territory of Guam would trigger NATO's Article 5, he said: "I will not speculate about whether Article 5 will be applied in such a situation."

==== Missile test over Japan on September 15 ====
On September 14, North Korea issued a threat to "sink" Japan, and turn the US to "ashes and darkness". The statement drew strong condemnation from Yoshihide Suga, who described the speech as "extremely provocative and egregious". The next day, an IRBM was fired from near Pyongyang and flew over Hokkaido, Japan before splashing down in the western Pacific about two thousand kilometers off Cape Erimo at about 7:16 am local time.

The missile traveled 3,700 kilometers (2,300 mi) achieving a maximum apogee of 770 kilometres (480 mi) during its 19-minute flight. It was the furthest any North Korean IRBM missile has gone above and beyond Japan. On September 18, North Korea announced that any further sanctions would only cause acceleration of their nuclear program.

==== U.S. and China agree on "pressure" ====
On September 18, the White House said president Donald Trump and Chinese president Xi Jinping had discussed North Korea's continued nuclear weapons and ballistic missile tests and committed to "maximising pressure on North Korea through vigorous enforcement" of UN Security Council resolutions on North Korea; North Korea said the sanctions would accelerate its nuclear program.

==== Trump's speech at UN GA, and Kim Jong Un's response ====
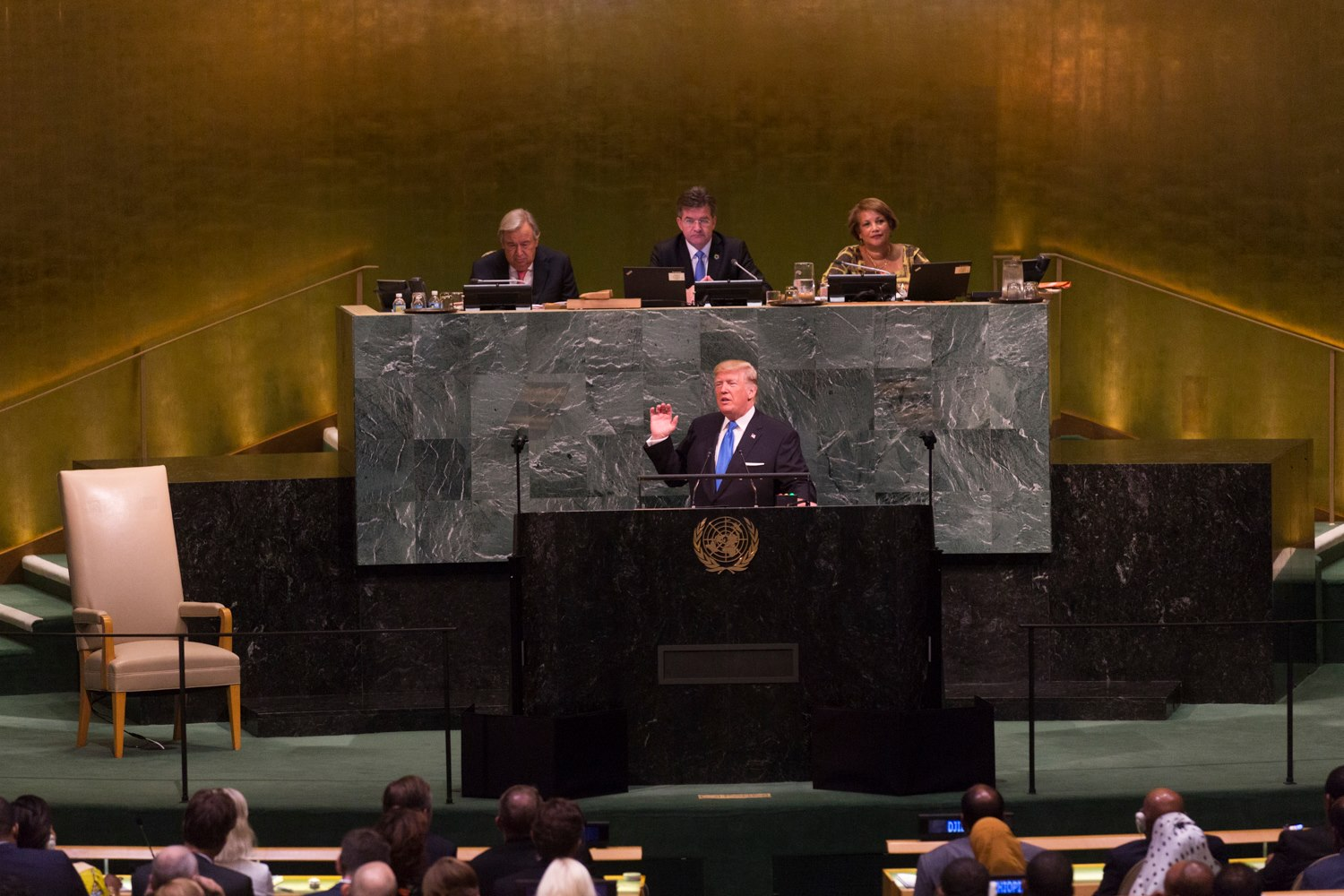
U.S. President Donald Trump giving his address at the 72nd Session of the United Nations General Assembly

On September 19, Donald Trump, in his first address to the United Nations General Assembly, said that the United States: "if it is forced to defend itself or its allies, we will have no choice but to totally destroy North Korea. Rocket Man [Kim Jong Un] is on a suicide mission for himself and for his regime. The United States are ready, willing and able, but hopefully this will not be necessary." Also, without mentioning it by name, Donald Trump criticized China for maintaining relations with NK, calling it "an outrage that some nations would not only trade with such a regime, but would arm, supply, and financially support a country that imperils the world with nuclear conflict".

On September 20, U.S. president Donald Trump signed an executive order that further toughened U.S. sanctions against North Korea: the U.S. Treasury was thereby authorized to target firms and financial institutions conducting business with NK. Commenting on the executive order, Treasury Secretary Steven Mnuchin said, "Foreign financial institutions are now on notice that going forward they can choose to do business with the United States or North Korea, but not both."

On September 21, responding directly for the first time to President Trump's threat, North Korea's leader Kim Jong Un in his capacity of Chairman of State Affairs of DPRK called Trump a "mentally deranged U.S. dotard" (Korean: 늙다리 미치광이, romanized: Neukdari michigwangi, lit. 'Old man lunatic') and vowed the "highest level of hard-line countermeasure in history." (The ad hominem insults aside, no reference was made to the "hostile policy" of the United States, a staple of North Korean statements otherwise.) Foreign minister Ri Yong-ho likewise alluded to Trump as a barking dog, and furthermore remarked that North Korea might be considering the largest test of a hydrogen bomb ever in the Pacific Ocean, which would constitute the first atmospheric nuclear test in the world since 1980 (last performed by China).

On September 25, North Korea's Foreign Minister Ri Yong Ho accused Trump of declaring war on his country, referring to Trump's recent tweet that North Korea "won't be around much longer." The White House responded that the United States has not declared war.

On September 30, Rex Tillerson stated while on a trip to China, that the U.S. and North Korea were in "direct contact". "We have lines of communications to Pyongyang" he said, "We're not in a dark situation". He further stated that the U.S. was "probing" the possibility of direct talks. "So stay tuned". The Associated Press has claimed that a long-used back-channel has been re-opened in the past months, the 'New York Channel', facilitating communication between Washington and Pyongyang. The next day however, Trump made a series of posts on Twitter which seemed to undermine Tillerson's efforts, claiming that Tillerson was "wasting his time" trying to negotiate with North Korea and that "we'll do what has to be done".

Former CIA Director John O. Brennan, during a Q&A session at Fordham University on October 18, remarked that "I think the prospects of military conflict in the Korean peninsula are greater than they have been in several decades... I don't think it's likely or probable, but if it's a 1-in-4 or 1-in-5 chance, that's too high."

==== Argument about nuclear armament of South Korea and Japan ====
An argument emerged in both South Korea and Japan about the nuclear option, driven by worry that the United States might hesitate to defend the countries if doing so might provoke a missile launched from the North at major U.S. cities. In South Korea, polls show that 60 percent of the population favors building nuclear weapons, and that nearly 70 percent want the United States to reintroduce tactical nuclear weapons, which were withdrawn in 1991. In October, Hong Jun-pyo, one of the leading South Korean opposition figures, argued "only by deploying tactical nuclear weapons on South Korean territory can we negotiate with North Korea on an equal footing." Republican Senator John McCain urged that the U.S. should consider deploying nuclear weapons to South Korea. Former United States Secretary of State Henry Kissinger mentioned "If North Korea continues to have nuclear weapons, nuclear weapons must spread in the rest of Asia."

==== Armistice violation in early November 2017 ====
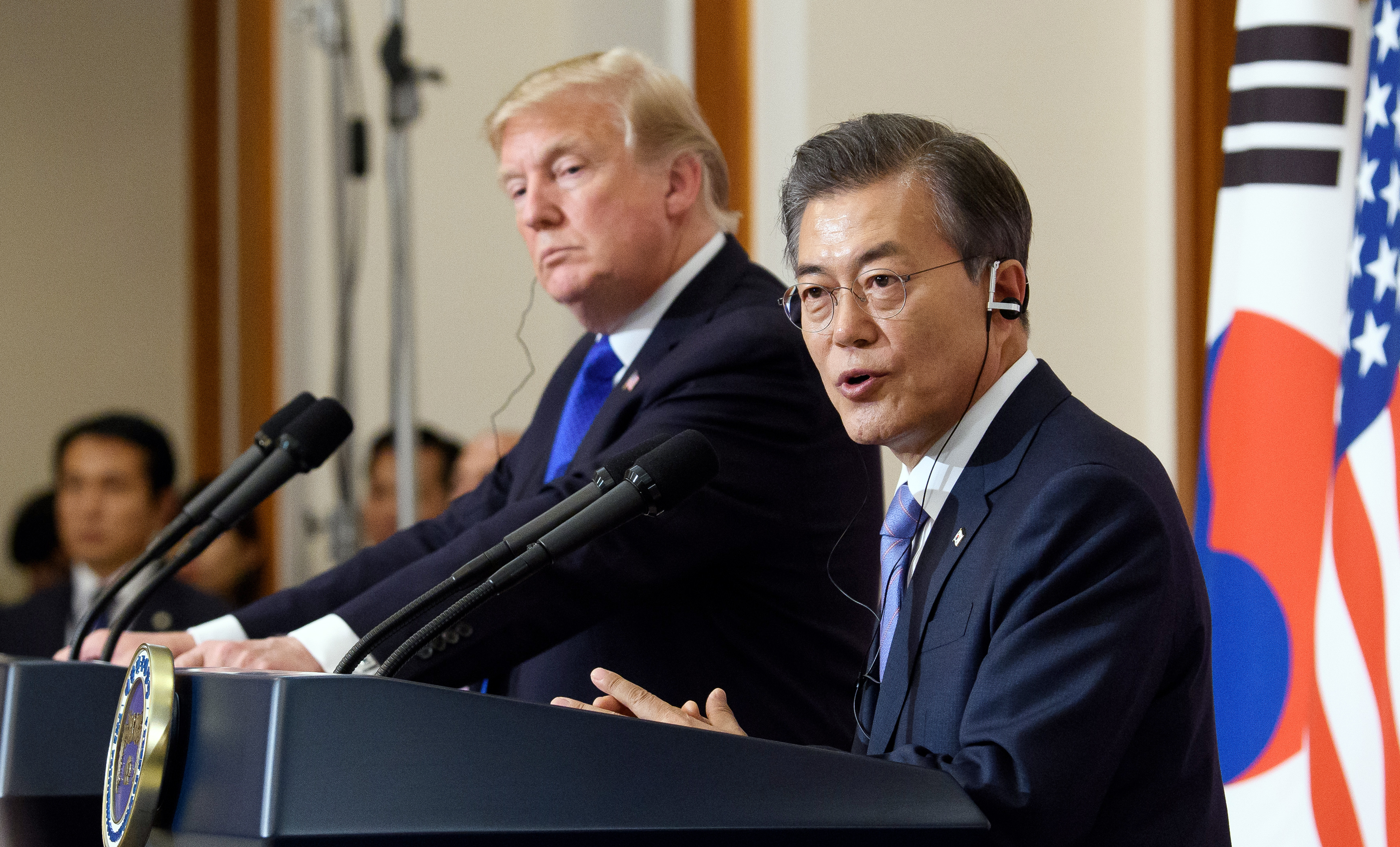
South Korean President Moon Jae-in with U.S. President Donald Trump in November 2017

On November 13, North Korean soldiers unsuccessfully attempted to prevent Oh Chong-song, a defector from crossing the border in the Joint Security Area. The UN Command stated that North Korean soldiers had violated the armistice agreement by firing more than 40 shots in the demilitarized zone and in the case of one soldier by briefly crossing the military demarcation line.

==== Re-listing as State Sponsor of Terrorism ====
On November 20, 2017, Trump officially announced re-listing North Korea as a State Sponsor of Terrorism, which called the move as a "serious provocation".

=== Third ICBM test and aftermath: November 2017 ===
On November 28, North Korea conducted its third intercontinental ballistic missile test, marking the end of a two-month span in which no missile tests were conducted. Photos of Hwasong-15 show the missile's booster engines are two Hwasong-14 engines bundled for its first stage, as agreed by three separate analysts, Tal Inbar, Kim Dong-yub, and Chang Young-Keun. The missile was said to have flown to a record altitude of 4,500 kilometres (2,800 mi) and landed in the Sea of Japan into the exclusive economic zone, a distance of 1,000 kilometres (600 mi). breaking up into three pieces. Initial assessments made by the Pentagon and subsequent analysis suggested that it was an ICBM judging by the height it traveled and, if fired on a normal trajectory, would more than be able to reach anywhere in the continental United States. The South Korean and Japanese defense ministries also concluded that an ICBM was likely launched and that it had traveled in a lofted trajectory. Japanese defense minister Itsunori Onodera also added that the missile broke apart into at least three pieces before it crashed into the waters located within the exclusive economic zone, indicating that the re-entry vehicle failed to survive re-entry into the Earth's atmosphere. It was launched from a larger launcher vehicle, with 9 axles, as opposed to the 8-axle vehicles purchased from China. Each of the three ICBMs launched so far have been launched from three different locations.

In a press conference shortly after the launch, President Trump said regarding North Korea's ICBM launch that "we'll handle it".

==== Reports of sanction violations in December 2017 ====
In late December 2017, it was reported that Chinese and Russian-flagged tanker ships had been observed conducting at-sea transfers of oil and petroleum products to North Korean ships over the course of the previous year, violating sanctions imposed by the US and United Nations. In posts on Twitter, Trump blasted China for defying the sanctions and continuing to support North Korea. One of these vessels, Lighthouse Winmore registered out of Hong Kong with 23 Chinese crew members, was seized by South Korean officials after reportedly delivering 600 tons of oil illegally to the North Korean vessel Sam Jong 2 in a part of the West Sea, between China and South Korea back in October.

Executive Order 13722 blocks, among other items, the export of laborers which benefit the government of North Korea, or the Worker's Union Party. On 1 January 2018 The New York Times reported that as many as 147,000 workers from North Korea now work abroad, and that the Worker's Union Party of Pyongyang garnishes from 30 to 80 percent of the workers' wages. The specific businesses reported included a shipyard, a shipping container manufacturer, and greenhouses in Poland.

=== Winter Olympics "détente" and further developments: January–February 2018 ===
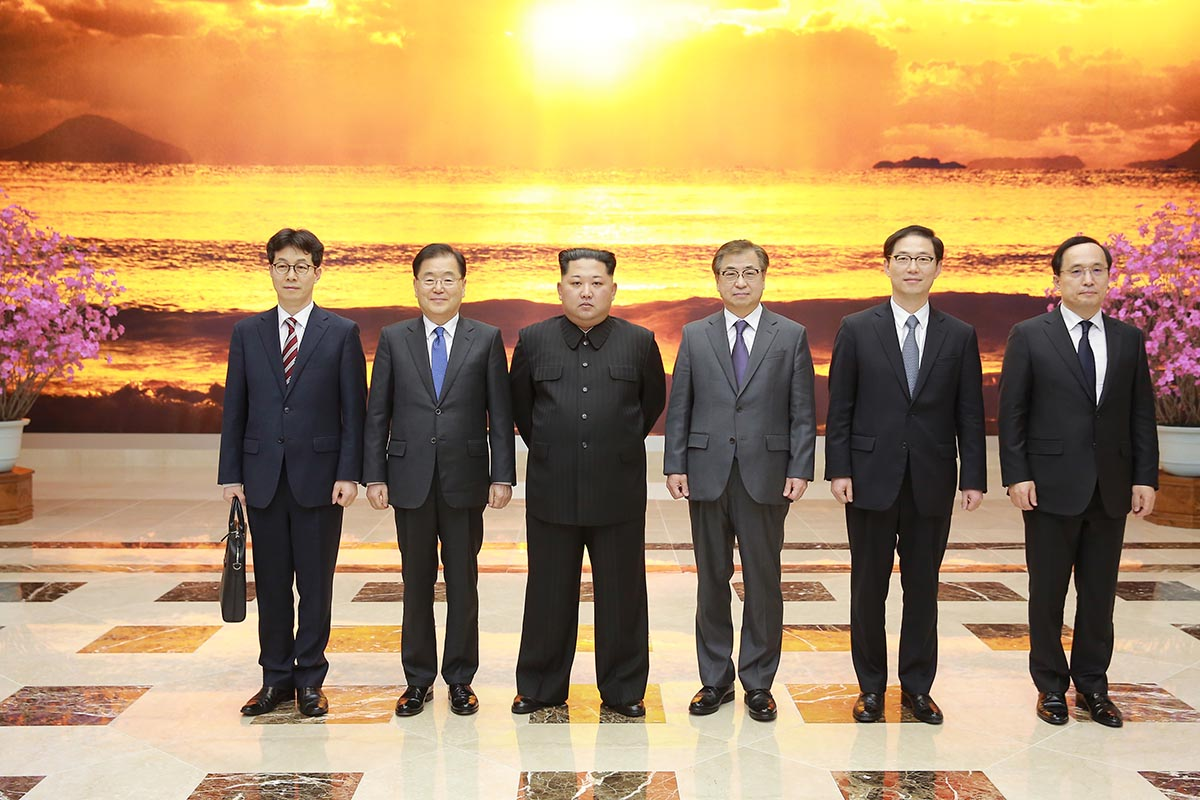
Kim Jong Un meeting with South Korean envoys at the Workers' Party of Korea main building, 6 March 2018

The crisis had caused concern about the safety of the 2018 Winter Olympics to be held in Pyeongchang in South Korea. It was widely believed that if North Korea participated in the Games, the risk of escalation would diminish. This theory was later put to the test when North Korea's leader Kim Jong Un signaled a possibility to send athletes to the Games after all in his New Year's speech for 2018, saying "North Korea's participation in the Winter Games will be a good opportunity to showcase the national pride and we wish the Games will be a success. Officials from the two Koreas may urgently meet to discuss the possibility". The announcement was followed by South Korean agreement to participate in the first high-level talks with the North since December 2015. The talks were scheduled for 9 January 2018. North Korea is also prepared to talk to the IOC that week. In preparation for the North–South talks, the two countries restored the Seoul–Pyongyang hotline, which had been inactive for almost two years, and exchanged related documents via fax. After these developments, North Korea's IOC member Chang Ung said that the participation of North Korean figure skaters again looked likely. The possibility of North Korean participation has stirred up talk about a possible Olympic boycott by the United States, after the administration of President Donald Trump, who has been at loggerheads with Kim Jong Un, has issued mixed messages. After discussions on 9 January 2018, North Korea announced they would send athletes to compete along with a delegation to attend the Winter Olympics.

North and South Korea marched together in the Olympics opening ceremony and fielded a united women's ice hockey team. As well as the athletes, North Korea sent an unprecedented high-level delegation, headed by Kim Yo Jong, sister of Kim Jong Un, and President Kim Yong-nam, and including performers like the Samjiyon Orchestra. The delegation passed along an invitation to President Moon to visit North Korea.

According to North Korea expert Sung-Yoon Lee, North Korea's policy toward the Olympics is to enhance North Korea's status: "One doesn't need to be a genius to see that this is what North Korea does: After having created a war-like, crisis atmosphere, (Kim [Jong-un]) takes a small step back and there's a collective sigh of relief that there's no war. It does wonders for North Korea's image."

==== False alarms in Hawaii and Japan ====
Residents and tourists in the U.S. state of Hawaii were briefly thrown into a panic when an emergency alert was issued January 13, 2018, advising of an imminent ballistic missile threat. Another message was sent out about 40 minutes later describing the first alert as a false alarm.

Three days later in Japan, broadcasting agency NHK also accidentally sent an alert about a North Korean missile launch in error. The error was corrected in minutes.

==== 2018 State of the Union Address ====
In his first State of the Union address, President Trump devoted much time to North Korea, stoking fears that an American strike was under serious consideration and not mere saber-rattling, particularly given the withdrawal of Dr. Victor Cha as Ambassador to the Republic of Korea and its similarity to George W. Bush's Axis of Evil 2002 State of the Union Address. Isaac Stone Fish of The Atlantic published an article stating that North Korea isn't a threat to Americans despite what Trump wanted people to think and criticized Washington for hyping Pyongyang as a threat.

==== Speculation about attack on North Korea ====
In mid-February, as the Olympics were ongoing, after previous media reports, the Trump administration denied considering a so-called preemptive "bloody nose" attack on North Korea's nuclear program. Assistant Secretary of State for East Asian and Pacific Affairs Susan Thornton confirmed that the administration's policy remains one of "maximum pressure" via economic sanctions in order to get North Korea to negotiate on eliminating its nuclear weapons. Thornton however reiterated that military options are still "on the table" and that Pyongyang would be forced to give up its nuclear weapons "one way or another".

=== Beginning of peace efforts ===
==== Inter-Korean summits ====
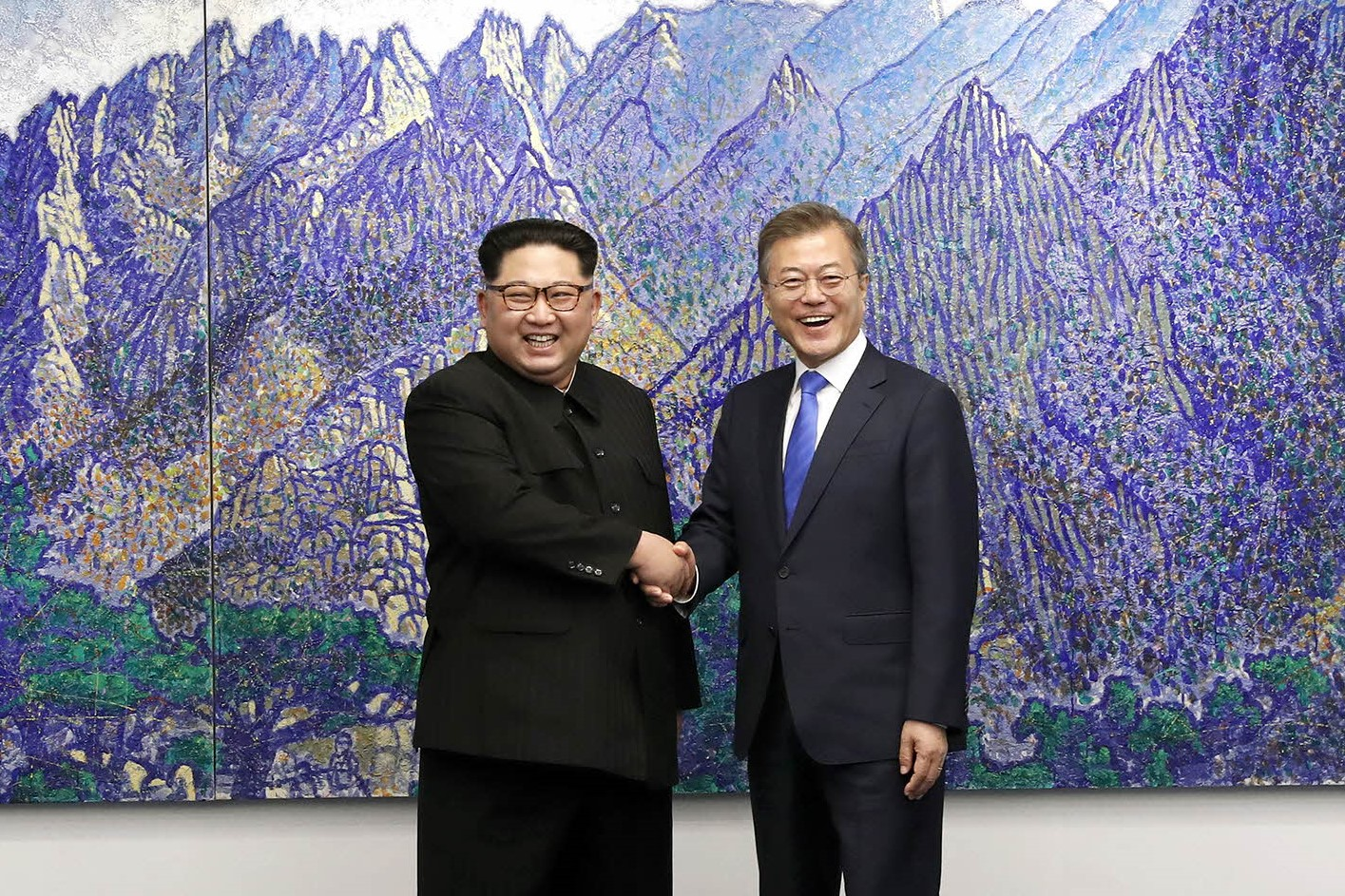
Kim Jong Un and South Korean President Moon Jae-in during the April 2018 inter-Korean summit

On April 27, the two leaders met at the Joint Security Area, with Kim Jong Un crossing the MDL in South Korean territory, the first time a North Korean leader has done so. President Moon also briefly crossed into the North's territory. Both Moon and Kim signed the Panmunjom Declaration, declaring the Korean conflict over and to sign a proper peace treaty by the end of the year. With that, Moon agreed to visit Pyongyang in the fall.

===== 2018 Singapore summit =====
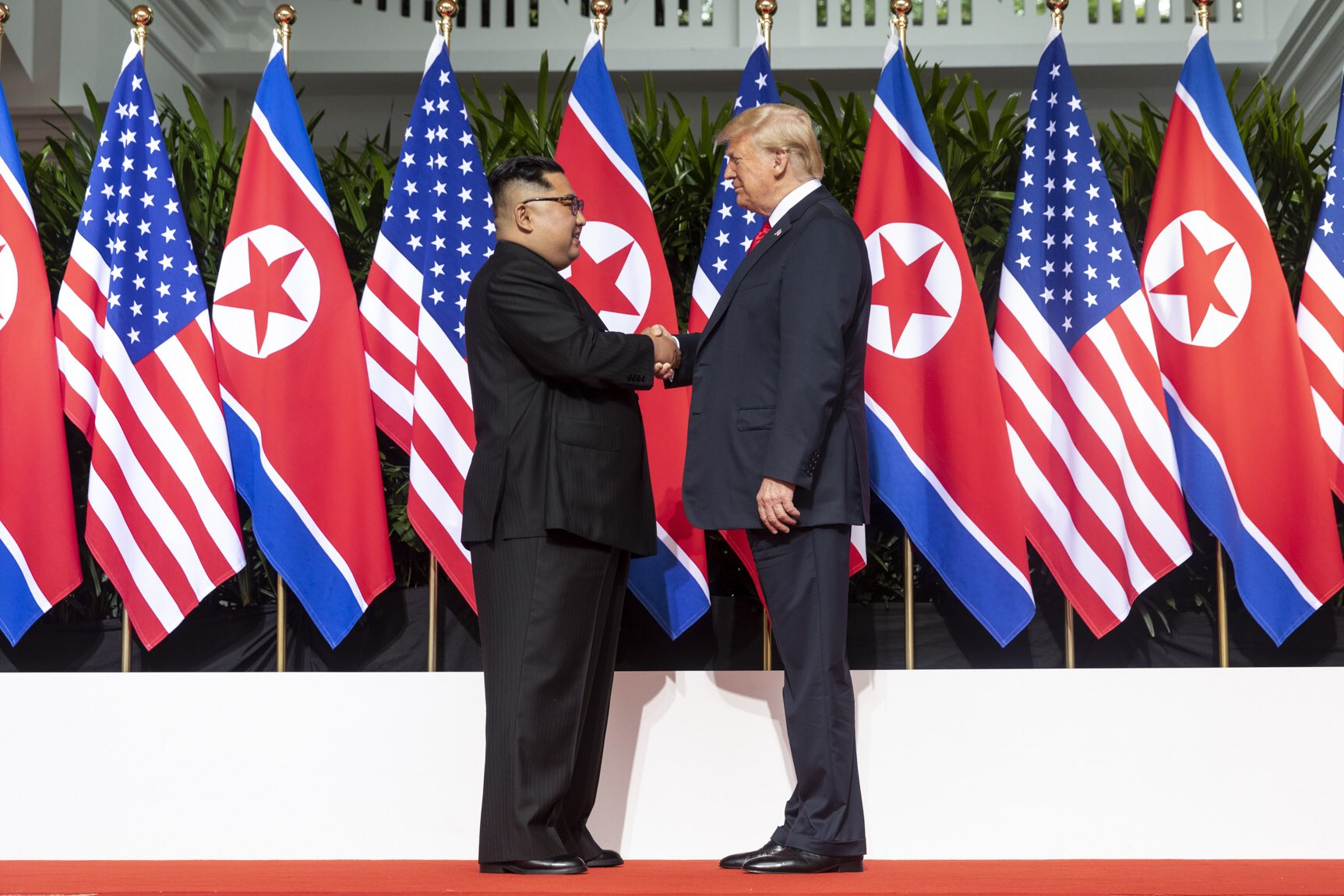
Kim Jong Un and U.S. President Donald Trump during the 2018 North Korea–United States summit

On March 8, in a surprise departure from the hostile dialogue during 2017, Trump announced that he would meet with leader Kim Jong Un, and the two would meet likely by May. Press secretary Sarah Huckabee Sanders said that "in the meantime, all sanctions and maximum pressure must remain." North Korea accepts South Korea's proposal to hold the high-level inter-Korean talks, which took place on March 29. On May 24, President Trump cancelled the planned meeting with Chairman Kim over "tremendous anger and open hostility" displayed by Kim. On June 1, President Trump reversed the cancellation and confirmed that the summit would take place on June 12 as planned.

Following their talks, both leaders signed a joint declaration titled "Joint Statement of President Donald J. Trump of the United States of America and Chairman Kim Jong Un of the Democratic People's Republic of Korea at the Singapore Summit". It states:

1. The United States and the DPRK commit to establish new U.S.–DPRK relations in accordance with the desire of the peoples of the two countries for peace and prosperity.
2. The United States and the DPRK will join their efforts to build a lasting and stable peace regime on the Korean Peninsula.
3. Reaffirming the April 27, 2018 Panmunjom Declaration, the DPRK commits to work towards the complete denuclearization of the Korean Peninsula.
4. The United States and the DPRK commit to recovering POW/MIA remains including the immediate repatriation of those already identified.

=== Suspicion of continued nuclear program ===
In June 2018, NBC News reported that U.S. intelligence believed that North Korea was increasing production of enriched uranium for nuclear weapons and that, in addition to its known fuel-producing facility at Yongbyon, it had multiple secret nuclear sites. In August 2018, US officials said that North Korea could be continuing to build nuclear weapons, and days later the United Nations Security Council received reports that North Korea may not have stopped its nuclear program. The reports also claimed that North Korea was violating the UN sanctions.

In late September 2018, Trump claimed that North Korea had already stopped nuclear testing, and he said that the United States would not impose any required timeline for North Korea's total denuclearization. "I've got all the time in the world...we are not playing the 'time game.' If takes two years, three years, or five months, it doesn't matter," Trump said. He was responding to and denying U.S. Secretary of State Mike Pompeo's claim that North Korea's denuclearization would be completed by January 2021. Trump maintained that sanctions against North Korea would stay in place until it had denuclearized.

Satellite images obtained by CNN in December 2018 show that the Yeongjeo-dong long-range missile base (the existence of which was already public knowledge) remains active. The images also revealed continued construction on an underground facility and construction on a facility (the existence of which was previously unknown to the public) several kilometres from Yeongjeo-dong.

=== 2019 Hanoi summit ===
A second summit between Kim and Trump occurred on February 27–28, 2019.

== See also ==
- 1994 North Korean nuclear crisis
- 2017 North Korean missile tests
- 2017 North Korean nuclear test
- Korean conflict
- Korean reunification
- List of North Korean missile tests
