= Team Spirit =

1974–1993 U.S.–South Korea military exercises

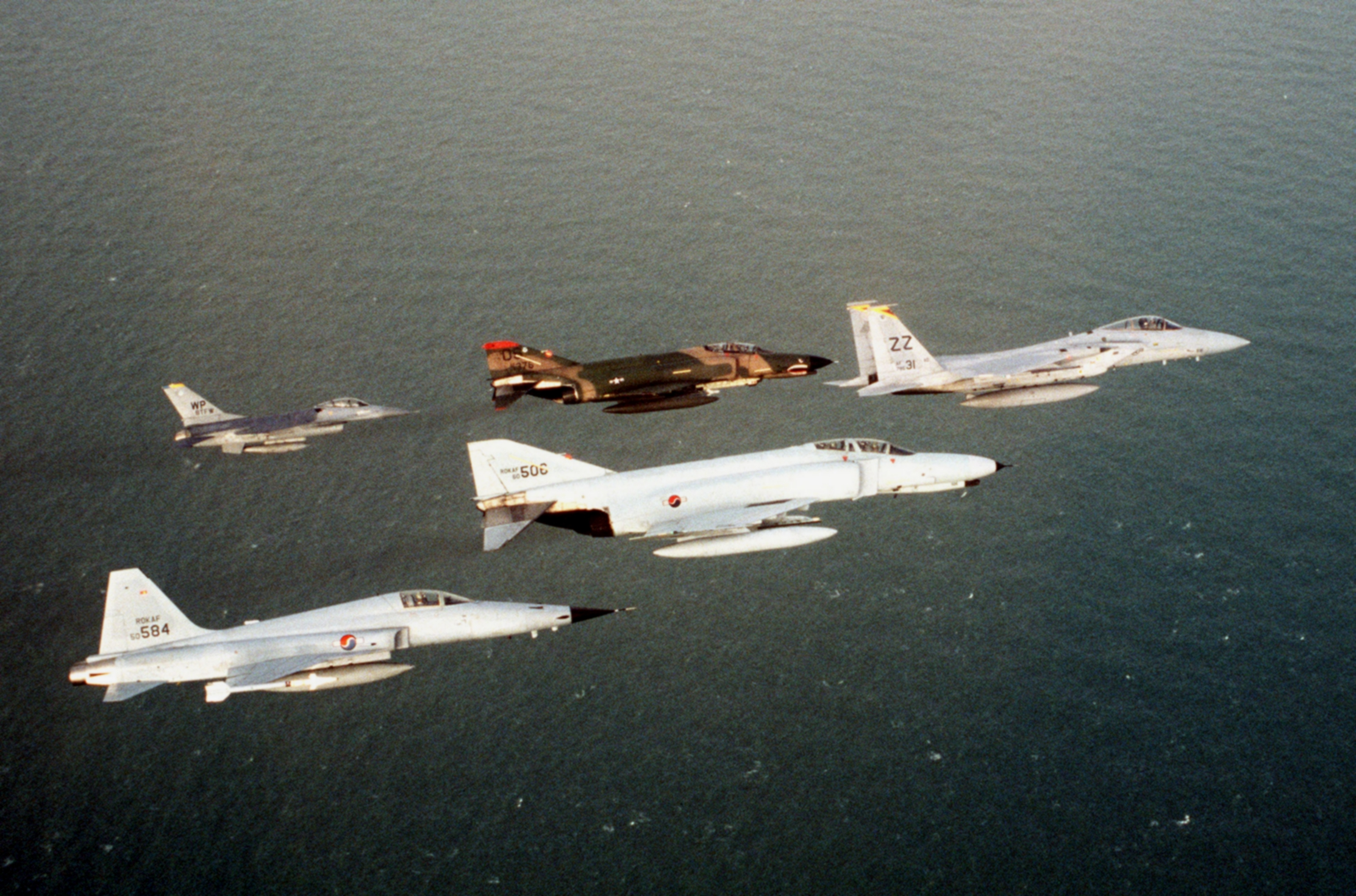
American and South Korean fighter aircraft flying in formation during Exercise Team Spirit 84

Team Spirit was a joint military training exercise of United States Forces Korea and the Military of South Korea held between 1974 and 1993. The exercise was also scheduled from 1994 to 1996 but cancelled during this time period as part of diplomatic efforts to encourage the Government of North Korea to disable the North Korean nuclear weapons program. The North Korea regime abandoned talks following the January 1986 Team Spirit exercises, and in late 1992, North Korea unilaterally withdrew from the South-North High-Level Talks due to the 1993 Team Spirit exercise.

Until 2007 the exercise had been called "Reception, Staging, Onward Movement and Integration of Forces" (RSOI). As of March 2008, it is called Key Resolve. North Korea has denounced the joint military exercise as a "war game aimed at a northward invasion." Team Spirit is a tactical exercise conducted in the spring. RSOI is a command post exercise conducted in late summer. RSOI focused on staff procedures at theater level to get the force into theater. Team Spirit focused on tactical procedures at the brigade level (of course, with Division, Corps and Theater command and control).

== See also ==
- Foreign relations of North Korea
- Foreign relations of South Korea
