= Ulchi-Freedom Guardian =

South Korean-American military exercise

Ulchi-Freedom Guardian (을지 프리덤 가디언, Eulji peurideom gadieon) is the name (as of 2015) of the military exercise previously known as Ulchi-Focus Lens, a combined military exercise between South Korea and the United States. The exercise is the world's largest computerized command and control implementation, involving 50,000 South Korean troops alongside 17,500 U.S. troops in 2017, and mainly focuses on defending South Korea from a North Korean attack. The exercise was initiated in 1976 and is conducted annually during August or September. The word 'Ulchi' comes from the name of a famous Korean general called Ŭlchi Mundŏk, who was the Commander-In-Chief of the army of Goguryeo.

== History ==
The origin of the exercise is Taeguk Yeonseup (태극연습, Taeguk Exercise), which began after the Blue House Raid by North Korean special forces in 1968. The title of the exercise was changed to Ulchi Yeonseup (을지연습, Ulchi Exercise) in the following year. In 1976, it was integrated with ROK-US Combined Forces Command's military training, Focus Lens, into Ulchi-Focus Lens. The name of the exercise was changed again in 2008 to Ulchi-Freedom Guardian.

The exercise has on occasion included contingents from Australia, Britain, Canada, Colombia, Denmark, the Netherlands and New Zealand.

In 2022, thousands of protesters demonstrated against the drills in South Korea.

== Reaction of North Korea ==
North Korea routinely denounces the exercise as preparation for war.

On 20 August 2012, the exercise began between South Korea and the United States over the objections of North Korea. North Korea alleged that the drill was a precursor to a war planned against them. The North Korean foreign ministry stated that "the prevailing situation requires us to bolster up the war deterrent physically and goes to prove that it was entirely just when we determined to fully reexamine the nuclear issue." The United States Department of State countered, saying that North Korea must refrain from "bellicose statements." General James D. Thurman, added on, stating that Ulchi Freedom Guardian is "a key exercise in strengthening the readiness of Republic of Korea and U.S. forces."

The 2017 exercise took place August 21–31, during a crisis over successful North Korean missile tests and strong rhetoric by U.S. President Trump. The U.S. manpower contribution for the exercise was reduced from 25,000 in 2016 to 17,500. South Korean media reported that the U.S. had cancelled plans to deploy strategic assets in the exercise, such as aircraft carriers, nuclear-powered submarines or a B1 bomber. U.S. Forces Korea did not comment on the reason.

In 2018, the South Korean government cancelled that year's exercise. However, joint US-South Korean military exercises resumed again on November 5, 2018, though on a small scale compared to previous exercises. A buffer zone had been established across the Korean Demilitarized Zone on November 1, 2018, to prohibit both Koreas from conducting live-fire artillery drills and regiment-level field maneuvering exercises or those by bigger units within 5 kilometers of the Military Demarcation Line (MDL). No fly zones was also established along the DMZ to ban the operation of drones, helicopters and other aircraft from coming within 10 to 40 km away from the MDL.

In August 2019, a similar but scaled down exercise under an undisclosed name was carried out, mainly using computer simulations. The main scenario was South Korea taking over from the U.S. 90 days after the outbreak of a war to carry out stabilization operations after North Korea has been neutralised. For the first time a South Korean General led the exercise. North Korea complained that the exercise violated U.S. President Donald Trump's promise to halt major war games.

== See also ==
- Ulchi-Focus Lens: joint military exercise between South Korea and the United States (1976–2008)
- Ulchi-Freedom Guardian: joint exercise between South Korea and the United States (2009–2017), (2018 temporarily canceled)
- Foal Eagle: joint military exercise between South Korea and the United States (1997–2014)
- Max Thunder: joint military exercise between South Korea and the United States (2015–2018)
