= 2020 in South Korea =

- Centuries: 20th; 21st
- Decades: 2000s; 2010s; 2020s; 2030s
- See also: Other events of 2020; Years in South Korea; Timeline of Korean history 2020 in North Korea

The following lists events in the year 2020 in South Korea.

== Incumbents ==
- President: Moon Jae-in
- Prime Minister:
  - Lee Nak-yeon (until January 14),
  - Chung Sye-kyun (since January 14)

=== Governors ===
- Gyeonggi: Lee Jae-myung
- Gangwon: Choi Moon-soon
- North Chungcheong: Lee Si-jong
- South Chungcheong: Yang Seung-jo
- North Jeolla: Song Ha-jin
- South Jeolla: Kim Yung-rok
- North Gyeongsang: Lee Cheol-woo
- South Gyeongsang: Kim Kyoung-soo
- Jeju: Won Hee-ryong

== Events ==
=== January ===
- 1 January: The 2020 Chuncheon forest fire were occurred at Chuncheon, Gangwon Province, 7 hectares burned down here.
- 17 January: 6 people, including a teacher and a local guide, who were enjoying trekking in Nepal are missing. For more details see 2020 Annapurna teacher missing.
- 20 January: COVID-19 pandemic in South Korea — first confirmed case of the coronavirus pandemic reported in South Korea.
- 30 January: The Liaison Office between two Koreas in the border town of Kaesong was shut down for an unspecified time regarding infection concern. The decision was made after negotiations between the representatives of both countries earlier morning on 30 January, informed by the Unification Ministry of South Korea.
- 31 January: 2020 coronavirus pandemic in South Korea — 368 Chinese nationals arrived in Gimpo International Airport and Incheon International Airport for Korean Air Special Charter flights during the coronavirus pandemic

=== February ===
- 8 February: South Koreans least trusting of Japan among six nations surveyed, The proportion of people who trust Japan is lowest in South Korea among six countries covered by a Japanese think tank survey released on Saturday since the 2019–2020 Japan–South Korea trade dispute.
- 9 February: South Korean film Parasite wins four Academy Awards, including Best Picture and Best Director for Bong Joon-ho at the 92nd Academy Awards, Since the 2019 Cannes Film Festival won Palme d'Or, becoming the first film not in the English language to do so.
- 19 February: COVID-19 pandemic in South Korea — the number of confirmed cases increased by 20. On 20 February, 70 new cases were confirmed, giving a total of 104 confirmed cases, according to the Centers for Disease Control and Prevention Korea (KCDC). According to Reuters, KCDC attributed the sudden jump to 70 cases linked to "Patient No. 31", who had participated in a gathering in Daegu at the Shincheonji.
- 24 February: 2020 coronavirus pandemic in South Korea – South Korea as a super-spreader hits from Wuhan to Daegu. It was more than 800 cases, it became the second largest confirmed cases by country after China.

=== March ===
- 2 March: There were over 4,200 confirmed cases. With an additional 4,000 cases of COVID-19 within two weeks, and roughly 60% of the total infections nationwide having stemmed from the church, the Seoul city government asked prosecutors to press charges against the religious group's founder and senior members for murder, causing harm, and for violating the Infectious Disease and Control Act. Interviews have occurred with all 230,000 members of the religious group and nearly 9,000 were said to be showing symptoms of the virus. Due to the number of infections in the country, ninety-five countries have banned or limited entry for South Korean passport holders. Testing is also conducted at drive-through testing sites where patients do not leave their vehicles but are met by medical personnel in hazmat suits over several stations. The process is completed in a few minutes and results come in several days.
- 8 March: The KCDC in South Korea announced that 79.4% of confirmed COVID-19 cases were related to group infection. KCDC also announced that the outbreak associated with Shincheonji Church totaled 4,482 infections, accounting for 62.8% of the total confirmed cases.
- 13 March: Since the first time since the outbreak on 20 January in which the number of recoveries, 177, was larger than the number of those who newly tested positive, 110. However, with the recent cluster of cases in the Seoul Capital Area, there are new fears that infections may rise sharply.
- 17 March:
  - The controversy about Shincheonji also continued and generated international interest. After the lawsuit started by the Mayor of Seoul, the police raided the church premises to check whether the list of members supplied by Shincheonji pursuant to a request by the authorities was, as the Mayor argued, not complete. The authorities checked the list seized during the raid with the one Shincheonji had supplied and concluded that discrepancies were minor.
  - Around 79 church devotees were infected with the virus after attending the River of Grace Community Church. The infections were claimed to have been caused by spraying salt water into followers' mouths, under the belief that this would protect them from the virus. Nearly 140 churches in Gyeonggi Province, which surrounds Seoul and is part of the Greater Seoul Area, will be closed if they do not implement preventative measures, including temperature checks, two-meter separation, and the wearing of masks.
- 30 March: As more churches are holding services despite a government order for social distancing, on 30 March, the controversial Manmin Central Church in Guro, Seoul became a cluster with 22 infections linked to a gathering in early March in which the group was preparing stock footage to use for online worship services. Other church clusters have appeared in the cities of Suwon, Busan, Geochang, and Bucheon.

=== April ===
- 1 April: 2020 coronavirus pandemic in South Korea — As infection rates have risen outside Korea leading to increases of sick arriving in the country (476 of 9,661 cases were imported as of 30 March), the KCDC will be implementing stronger infectious disease control measures for travelers coming from overseas as of 1 April. Additionally, new self-quarantine measures for travelers coming from Europe or the United States will be in effect from the same day. For example, those showing symptoms but test negative, and those who are without symptoms and are staying short-term in Korea, need to quarantine for two weeks in a government provided facility. Costs for the stay at the facility are the responsibility of the individual and total 100,000 won (US$81) per day.
- 13 April: 2020 coronavirus pandemic in South Korea — It was reported that at least 116 individuals who were infected and later cleared of the virus had again tested positive. The cause for this is under investigation but early speculation considered faulty tests, reactivation of the virus instead of re-infection, or remnants of the virus might remain yet not be harmful to the host or other individuals.
- 15 April: The 2020 South Korean legislative election will be held this year. The Democratic Party and its satellite, the Platform Party, won a landslide victory, taking 180 of the 300 seats (60%) between them. The conservative alliance between the United Future Party and its satellite Future Korea Party won only 103 seats, the worst conservative result since 1960.
- 17 April: 2020 coronavirus pandemic in South Korea — The KCDC stated that it knew of 163 patients who were said to have recovered, but again tested positive. The exact cause was not known but they stated several possibilities.
- 18–22 April: After several days with new infections numbering in the single digits (April 18, 20, 22), the government announced it was going to start lifting restrictions starting with stores, and public services; After seeing Korea successfully lower cases of infection, President Moon Jae-in has engaged in "coronavirus diplomacy" with leaders of other nations, part of which involved exporting test kits to more than 20 countries. On April 26, confirmed patient number 31 in Daegu was discharged after 67 days.

=== October ===
- 28 October: President Moon Jae-in announced South Korea's commitment to carbon neutrality by 2050, reaffirming Korea's Green New Deal.
- 29 October: The Supreme Court of South Korea upheld a 17-year prison term for former President Lee Myung-bak and ordered him sent back to prison.

== Deaths ==
- 19 January – Shin Kyuk-ho, Japanese-Korean businessman (b. 1921)
- 7 February – Go Soo-jung, actress and model (b. 1995)
- 8 February – Yi Hae-won, princess (b. 1919)
- 8 March – Johnny Yune, South Korean-American actor (b. 1936)
- 9 March – Lee Cha-su, politician and activist (b. 1957)
- 10 March – Hyun Kil-un, writer (b. 1940)
- 13 March – Moon Deoksu, poet (b. 1928)
- 18 March – Moon Ji-yoon, actor (b. 1984)
- 9 April – Won Pyong-oh, ornithologist (b. 1929)
- 12 April – Chung Won-shik, politician, 21st Prime Minister of South Korea (b. 1928)
- 9 July - Park Won-soon, politician, Mayor of Seoul (b. 1956)
- 10 July – Paik Sun-yup, South Korean military officer. (b. 1920)
- 20 October – Kim Nam-chun, footballer (b.1989)
- 25 October – Lee Kun-hee, businessman, Chairman of Samsung Group (b. 1942)
