= 2020 in Korea =

2020 in Korea may refer to:

- 2020 in North Korea
- 2020 in South Korea
