= 2018 in Korea =

2018 in Korea may refer to:

- 2018 in North Korea
- 2018 in South Korea
