= 2023 in Korea =

2023 in Korea may refer to:

- 2023 in North Korea
- 2023 in South Korea
