= 2022 in Korea =

2022 in Korea may refer to:

- 2022 in North Korea
- 2022 in South Korea
