= 2019 in Korea =

2019 in Korea may refer to:

- 2019 in North Korea
- 2019 in South Korea
