= 2021 in Korea =

2021 in Korea may refer to:

- 2021 in North Korea
- 2021 in South Korea
