= 2017 in Korea =

2017 in Korea may refer to:

- 2017 in North Korea
- 2017 in South Korea
