= 2016 in Korea =

2016 in Korea may refer to:

- 2016 in North Korea
- 2016 in South Korea
