= 2020 in North Korea =

- Centuries: 20th; 21st
- Decades: 2000s; 2010s; 2020s
- See also: Other events of 2020; Years in North Korea; Timeline of Korean history 2020 in South Korea

Events of 2020 in North Korea.

== Incumbents ==
- Party Chairman and State Chairman: Kim Jong Un
- President of the Supreme People's Assembly: Choe Ryong-hae
- Premier: Kim Jae-ryong (until 13 August), Kim Tok-hun (from 13 August)

== Events ==
=== January ===
- On January 1, Kim Jong Un declared North Korea's self-declared nuclear moratorium over. Kim accused the United States of stalling negotiations for its own political interests, and declared that North Korea would reveal a new "strategic weapon" unless U.S. sanctions were lifted.
- On January 9, the U.N. High Commissioner for Human Rights, Michelle Bachelet called on North Korea to create a human rights action plan, and to ratify key conventions on the protection of refugees, and against the use of torture.
- On January 18, Russia invited the heads of U.N. aid organizations and Kim In Ryong, North Korea's deputy ambassador to the U.N., to call on the U.N. to lift sanctions on North Korea.
- On January 24, Ri Son-gwon was appointed as North Korea's foreign minister. Ri, a former officer in the Korean People's Army, had previously led high-level talks between North and South Korea. Analysts believed that his appointment signalled North Korea taking a tougher stance in negotiations with the United States.
- On January 26, Kim Jong Un's aunt, Kim Kyong-hui reappeared in public. Kim Kyong-hui had not been seen since the execution of her husband Jang Song-thaek in 2013, leading to rumors that she had been purged alongside him.
- On January 30, both North and South Korea made the decision to close the Inter-Korean Liaison Office due to concerns over COVID-19.
- In late January, North Korea closed its borders due to the COVID-19 pandemic.

=== February ===
- On February 10, Thae Yong-ho, a former North Korean diplomat who had escaped to South Korea, announced plans to run in the 2020 South Korean legislative election.
- Also on February 10, a group of South Korean companies called on the South Korean government to re-open the Kaesong Industrial Complex, which had been closed by the Park Geun-hye administration in 2016.
- On February 11, a leaked report to the UN Security Council Sanctions Committee on North Korea revealed that North Korea had continued to make developments in its weapons programs despite sanctions.

=== March ===
- In March, North Korea conducted several missile tests. The first launch occurred on March 2, North Korea's first missile launch since November. Following this launch, Kim Jong Un's sister, Kim Yo-jong made her first statement under her own name, defending the launch as an "act of self-defense" and calling the South Korean presidential office "idiotic" for condemning the test. Subsequent launches occurred on the 9, 21, 28, and 29, making March a record month for North Korean missile launches.
- On March 5, North Korea made an official complaint to China over its handling of the China-North Korea border, and threatened to use force to control movement in the region. North Korean border guards were reportedly ordered to shoot those who came to close to the border as a precaution against the spread of COVID-19. The following day, China issued a warning to citizens not to come too close to the border.
- On March 9, the South Korean media outlet Daily NK, reported that 180 soldiers of the Korean People's Army had died of a respiratory illness, causing speculation over whether the deaths were a result of the COVID-19 pandemic.
- Also on March 9, the first flight left Pyongyang in over a month, taking around 80 foreign diplomats and business people to Vladivostok. Over the course of 2020, the vast majority of foreigners in North Korea, including most diplomats and all foreign Red Cross personnel, left the country.
- On March 10, The United States House of Representatives passed the "Korean War Divided Families Reunification Act," which directed the State Department to consult the South Korean government on opportunities for reunions between Korean Americans and their North Korean relatives.
- On March 11, following a report by Special Rapporteur Tomás Ojea Quintana, the Office of the High Commissioner for Human Rights announced that it would seek to identify those responsible for human rights abuses against prisoners in North Korea.
- On March 12, a report by the World Meteorological Organization claimed that around 10 million North Koreans were in urgent need of food assistance. The report pointed to irregular climate patterns and a shortage of inputs as factors which negatively affected North Korean farming.
- Also on March 12, it was revealed that North Korea had been offered COVID-19 pandemic assistance by the United States. Robert Destro, the Assistant Secretary of State for Democracy, Human Rights, and Labor, told press that the U.S. government had reached out to North Korea, as well as China and Iran, to offer assistance against the pandemic.
- On March 25, it was reported that 11 prisoners at the Chongori concentration camp had died due to respiratory issues, possibly related to COVID-19.
- On March 30, the 2020 Summer Olympics in which North Korean athletes were expected to compete in were postponed to summer of 2021 due to concerns over the COVID-19 pandemic.

=== April ===
- On April 12, Kim Jong Un was reported by Daily NK to have undergone cardiovascular surgery.
- On April 7, it was reported that North Korean authorities were conducting increased raids on privately-owned businesses as part of an attempt to strengthen government control over the economy and acquire foreign currency.
- On April 11, Kim Jong Un's sister, Kim Yo-jong, was promoted to alternate member of the Politburo.
- On April 14, North Korea launched what appeared to be cruise missiles and air-to-ground missiles into the East Sea ahead of South Korea's general election, and the Day of the Sun.
- On April 15, North Korea celebrated the Day of the Sun, marking Kim Il-sung's birthday. Kim Jong Un was notably missing from the ceremony, causing rumors to circulate surrounding his health.
- Also on April 15, South Korea held its legislative election, in which two North Korean defectors, Thae Yong-ho and Ji Seong-ho, secured seats.
- On April 18, a report for the UN Security Council Sanctions Committee on North Korea revealed that North Korean imports of refined petroleum had exceeded the limit imposed by United Nations Security Council Resolution 2397 by up to eight times in 2019. The report also estimated that North Korea had amassed around $370 million through illegal coal exports.
- On April 21, CNN reported that U.S. agencies monitoring intelligence from North Korea had said Kim Jong Un was in "grave danger" after his reported surgery.

=== May ===
- On May 2, Kim Jong Un disappeared from the public eye for the second time, having only just reappeared in public the day before. Kim remained out of sight until a meeting of the Central Military Commission on May 24. During this time, South Korean intelligence believed him to be operating from his villa in Wonsan.
- On May 3, North and South Korean soldiers briefly exchanged fire across the Korean Demilitarized Zone, after gunshots from North Korea hit a South Korean guardpost. An investigation conducted by the United Nations Command concluded that both Koreas had violated the Korean Armistice Agreement.
- On May 6, The Center for Strategic and International Studies released satellite imagery of a facility near Pyongyang Sunan International Airport believed to be used for the assembly of intercontinental ballistic missile components.
- On May 7, South Korea's National Intelligence Service detected Submarine-Launched Ballistic Missile-related activity in Sinpo.
- On May 13, the United States District Court for Washington D.C. ordered that information concerning North Korean assets held in U.S. banks be disclosed to the parents of Otto Warmbier.
- On May 15, South Korea released its annual white paper on human rights in North Korea. The paper pointed out the prevalence of the death penalty and political prison camps in North Korea. North Korea condemned the white paper as a "grave political provocation."

=== June ===
- On June 3, Thierry Ribaux, who led the Red Cross Pyongyang office until early February, told Yonhap News Agency that COVID-19 prevention measures in North Korea had made it impossible to ensure regular procurement of materials and rotation of staff. As a result, most humanitarian projects in North Korea came to a halt in 2020.
- On June 9, North Korea cut communication channels with South Korea. Experts believed this move signalled North Korea's frustration with the South's lack of progress on persuading the United States to lift sanctions.
- On June 12, on the anniversary of the 2018 North Korea-United States Singapore Summit, Kim Jong Un lamented that North Korea-United States relations had "shifted into despair" due to U.S. sanctions.
- On June 15, North Korea demolished the Inter-Korean Liaison Office in Kaesong following threats that they would close the office unless South Korea took action to stop anti-North Korean leaflet campaigns. North Korea also threatened to re-enter areas of the Korean Demilitarized Zone which had been de-militarized under the 2018 Inter-Korean Agreement.
- On June 22, the United Nations Human Rights Council adopted a resolution condemning North Korean human rights violations for the 18th year in a row.
- On June 25, on the 70th anniversary of the Korean War, relatives of South Koreans who had been abducted during the conflict sued the North Korean government for $28 million in the Seoul Central District Court.

=== July ===
- On July 3, South Korean president Moon Jae-in re-shuffled key positions responsible for inter-Korean affairs, including the unification minister. This was followed by a renewed push for engagement with North Korea.
- On July 7, the Seoul Central District Court ordered Kim Jong Un to pay damages to two South Koreans who had been held in North Korea against their wishes after the Korean War.
- On July 14, U.N. food and relief agencies compiled a report revealing that potentially half of the North Korean population was underfed between 2016 and 2019.
- On July 26, the city of Kaesong was placed under total lockdown after a man reportedly swam across the Imjin River with suspected COVID-19 symptoms. This was the first suspected case in the country.
- On July 28, the Office of the High Commissioner for Human Rights reported that female North Korean defectors suffered gender-specific abuses, including torture and rape, on being repatriated back to North Korea.

=== August ===
- On August 4, a leaked report for the UN Security Council Sanctions Committee on North Korea revealed that several nations believed that North Korea had developed miniaturized nuclear devices to fit ballistic missiles.
- Between August 5 and August 14, North Korea was hit by severe rain and flooding. It was estimated that 22 people died due to the flooding. Hundreds of homes were also destroyed, and agriculture devastated by the loss of land and ensuing disease and pests. Despite the damage, North Korea rejected external assistance due to fears of COVID-19.
- On August 11, South Korea's Ministry of Unification announced that it would begin auditing Korean humanitarian and human rights organizations. U.N. special rapporteur Tomás Ojea Quintana expressed concern over this move, which was also criticized by activists in South Korea, who worried that government pressure combined with the COVID-19 pandemic could threaten the North Korean 'Underground Railroad'.
- On August 20, Kim Jong Un admitted during a meeting of the Central Committee that North Korea had failed to achieve promised economic breakthroughs. Kim also delegated authority to key aides, including his sister, Kim Yo-jong, who was placed in charge of South Korean and U.S. affairs.
- On August 21, Jang Sung-min, a former lawmaker and aide to President Kim Dae-jung, claimed that Kim Jong Un was in a coma, and Kim Yo-jong poised to take over.
- On August 27, Typhoon Bavi landed in North Korea.

=== September ===
- On September 3, Typhoon Maysak landed in North Korea, causing heavy flooding in Wonsan, Hamhung, and Sinpo.
- On September 7, Typhoon Haishen reached North Korea. Combined with the earlier typhoons and rainfall, the damage was significant enough that soldiers and core party members were mobilized to aid recovery efforts. Local officials were punished for their perceived failings in mitigating damage from the typhoons. It was later reported by the U.N. that at least 20,000 people were impacted by the typhoons and flooding.
- On September 22, the United States sanctioned two Iranian officials for their role in facilitating missile-related cooperation with North Korea.
- On September 23, at the 75th session of the U.N. General Assembly, South Korean president Moon Jae-in gave a speech calling for a permanent end to the Korean War.
- Also on September 23, a South Korean civil servant was killed by North Korean soldiers in the West Sea. The act was swiftly condemned by the United States and South Korea, which prompted a rare apology from North Korea.
- On September 29, a female North Korean defector gave an anonymous interview with Reuters in which she recounted how she was sexually abused by two South Korean intelligence officers for over a year. This interview highlighted the widespread abuse faced by female defectors, at least a quarter of whom encountered sexual violence according to South Korean government data from 2017.
- On September 30, the Committee for Human Rights in North Korea used satellite imagery to identify a possible cremation facility in the Chongori concentration camp. Combined with testimony from former detainees, this indicated a high mortality rate among the prison population.

=== October ===
- On October 6, Kim Jong Un announced an 80-day campaign to try and accomplish North Korea's economic goals, which had been severely disrupted by the COVID-19 pandemic.
- On October 10, North Korea unveiled the missile Hwasong-16. The missile was shown off alongside a new submarine-launched ballistic missile during a parade celebrating the 75th anniversary of the Workers' Party of Korea. During his speech at the parade, Kim Jong Un appeared to tear up whilst recalling the adversity the North Korean people had suffered throughout the year.
- On October 11, the Danish documentary The Mole: Undercover in North Korea was released. The documentary revealed the extent of North Korea's sanctions evasion, and even prompted Denmark and Sweden to request a U.N. investigation into the matter.
- On October 15, U.N. special rapporteur Tomás Ojea Quintana released his report on human rights in North Korea, in which he noted how the COVID-19 pandemic had badly affected North Koreans' rights to food and health.
- On October 19, Human Rights Watch released a report on North Korea's opaque pre-trial detention and investigation system. Interviews with 22 former detainees and officials were used to reveal systematic torture, sexual abuse, and dangerous health conditions.
- On October 21, South Korea was provided a rare opportunity to rescue North Korean defectors who were trapped in China. North Korea had been consistently rejecting efforts by China to repatriate defectors due to concerns over COVID-19, which gave South Korea a chance to request their release.

=== November ===
- On November 11, the North Korean government introduced new management regulations for local markets as part of an attempt to strengthen control over the economy.
- Also on November 11, North Koreans were directed to join a "Food-Saving Struggle" after food shortages were exacerbated by the floods earlier in the year.
- On November 21, 7000 prisoners were released from North Korean labor camps in a mass amnesty.
- On November 13, Microsoft reported that two North Korean hacking groups had targeted manufacturers of the COVID-19 vaccine.
- On November 19, the United Nations General Assembly Third Committee renewed their 2005 resolution calling for an improvement in the human rights situation in North Korea.
- On November 29, the Politburo held a meeting to plan for the 2021 party congress, during which officials were criticized by Kim Jong Un for "not guiding their sectors scientifically."

=== December ===
- On December 6, the Supreme People's Assembly unanimously passed the law "on rejecting reactionary ideology and culture." This law would become infamous for mandating excessive punishments for those caught consuming South Korean media.
- On December 11, the Federal Customs Service of Russia released data showing that Russian exports to North Korea fell 81% in October. This was indicative of a larger collapse in trade between North Korea and its neighbors after the country closed its borders in response to the COVID-19 pandemic.
- On December 12, the UN Security Council held a meeting on the issue of human rights in North Korea, during which seven members accused North Korea of using the COVID-19 pandemic to further suppress human rights.
- On December 15, South Korea passed the "Amended Provisions of the Development of Inter-Korean Relations Act", or 'Anti-Leaflet Law.' This law punished those who sent fliers into North Korea with up to three years in prison or a fine of up to 20 million KRW. The law was criticised domestically and internationally for interfering with the freedom of expression, and conceding to North Korea on the issue of leaflets.
- On December 16, the UN General Assembly adopted a resolution strongly condemning North Korea's "systematic, widespread and gross violations" of human rights for the 16th consecutive year.

== Deaths ==
=== January ===
- January 17 – Hwang Sun-hui, North Korean politician, director of the Korean Revolution Museum. (b. 1919)

=== April ===
- April 9 – Won Pyong-oh, South Korean zoologist, born in North Korea and escaped during the Korean War, son of Won Hong-gu. (b. 1929)

=== June ===
- June 9 – Kim Chang-sop, former Vice minister of the Ministry of State Security up until his death. (b. 1949)

=== July ===
- July 10 – Paik Sun-yup, North Korean born, South Korean military officer. (b. 1920)
