= 2016 in South Korea =

- Centuries: 20th; 21st
- Decades: 1990s; 2000s; 2010s; 2020s; 2030s
- See also: Other events of 2016; Years in South Korea; Timeline of Korean history 2016 in North Korea

== Incumbents ==
- President:
  - Park Geun-hye (Powers and duties suspended as of December 9, 2016),
  - Hwang Kyo-ahn (Acting President as of December 9, 2016)
- Prime Minister: Hwang Kyo-ahn

=== Governors ===
- Gyeonggi: Nam Kyung-pil
- Gangwon: Choi Moon-soon
- North Chungcheong: Lee Si-jong
- South Chungcheong: An Hee-jung
- North Jeolla: Song Ha-jin
- South Jeolla: Lee Nak-yon
- North Gyeongsang: Kim Kwan-yong
- South Gyeongsang: Hong Joon-pyo
- Jeju: Won Hee-ryong

== Events ==
=== March ===
- March 11–15 - 2016 World Short Track Speed Skating Championships in Seoul

=== April ===
- April 13 - 2016 South Korean legislative election

=== September ===
- September 27-October 2 - 2016 Korea Open Superseries in Seoul

=== November ===
- November 1 - Choi Soon-sil, the woman at the center of the South Korean political scandal involving President Park Geun-hye, is detained for questioning.
- November 12 - In Seoul, a big protest occurs due to the Choi Soon-sil's political scandal, and the corruption of Park Geun-hye.

=== December ===
- December 9 - South Korean lawmakers impeach President Park Geun-hye by a 234–56 vote. Prime Minister Hwang Kyo-ahn, a staunch defender of Ms. Park, will serve as acting president. South Korea's Constitutional Court has up to 180 days to render a final decision.

== See also ==
- 2016 in South Korean television
- List of South Korean films of 2016
- 2016 in South Korean music
- 2016 in South Korean football
- Years in South Korea
