= 2022 in South Korea =

- Centuries: 20th; 21st
- Decades: 2000s; 2010s; 2020s; 2030s
- See also: Other events of 2022; Years in South Korea; Timeline of Korean history 2022 in North Korea

The following lists events in the year 2022 in South Korea.

== Incumbents ==
| Photo | Post | Name | Notes |
|---|---|---|---|
| | Outgoing President of South Korea | Moon Jae-in | Until May 10, 2022 |
| | President of South Korea | Yoon Suk-yeol | Since May 10, 2022 |
| | Outgoing Prime Minister of South Korea | Kim Boo-kyum | Until May 12, 2022 |
| | Outgoing Prime Minister of South Korea | Choo Kyung-ho | Acting until May 20, 2022 |
| | Prime Minister of South Korea | Han Duck-soo | Since May 21, 2022 |
| | Chief Justice of the Supreme Court of Korea | Kim Myeong-soo | Since September 25, 2017 |
| | President of the Constitutional Court of Korea | Yoo Nam-seok | Since September 21, 2018 |

== Events ==
- 11 January – In an apartment which was in construction in Gwangju, the outer wall collapsed, trapping 6 workers, later one was found dead.
- 9 March – 2022 South Korean presidential election: Yoon Suk-yeol is narrowly elected as president.
- 10 May – Yoon Suk-yeol is inaugurated, becoming the 13th president of South Korea.
- 1 June – 2022 South Korean local and by-elections. President Yoon's party, the People Power Party, decisively won the local elections.
- 9 June – Daegu office fire
- 8 August – 2022 South Korean floods
- 29 October – Seoul Halloween crowd crush: at least 156 people are killed and 172 people are injured after a large crowd of people are crushed in a narrow street.

== Holidays ==
As per in the [Presidential Decree No. 28394, 2017. 10. 17., partially amended], the following days are declared holidays in South Korea:

- 1 January – New Year's Day
- 1 February to 3 February – Korean New Year
- 1 March – March 1st Movement Day
- 5 May – Children's Day South Korea
- 8 May – Buddha's Birthday
- 6 June – Memorial Day
- 15 August – National Liberation Day
- 9 September to 11 September – Chuseok
- 3 October – National Foundation Day
- 9 October – Hangul Day
- 25 December – Christmas Day

== Arts and entertainment ==
- List of South Korean films of 2022
- List of 2022 box office number-one films in South Korea
- 23rd Jeonju International Film Festival - April 28 – May 7, 2022
- 26th Bucheon International Fantastic Film Festival – July 7 – 17
- 27th Busan International Film Festival – October 5 – 14
- 2022 MBC Entertainment Awards
- 2022 SBS Entertainment Awards
- 2022 KBS Drama Awards
- 2022 MBC Drama Awards
- 2022 SBS Drama Awards

== Deaths ==
- 5 January – Kim Mi-soo, 29 (31 in Korean age), actress
- 26 March – Bang Jun-seok, 52, film score composer and music director
- 7 May – Kang Soo-yeon, 55, actress
- 8 June – Song Hae, 95, television music show host and singer
- 28 November – O Taeseok, 82, playwright and translator
