= 2021 in South Korea =

- Centuries: 20th; 21st
- Decades: 2000s; 2010s; 2020s; 2030s
- See also: Other events of 2021; Years in South Korea; Timeline of Korean history 2021 in North Korea

The following lists events in the year 2021 in South Korea.

== Incumbents ==
- President: Moon Jae-in (assumed office from May 10, 2017)
- Prime Minister:
  - Chung Sye-kyun (until April 16, 2021)
  - Hong Nam-ki (until May 14, 2021)
  - Kim Boo-kyum (from May 14, 2021)

=== Governors ===
- Gyeonggi: Lee Jae-myung
- Gangwon: Choi Moon-soon
- North Chungcheong: Lee Si-jong
- South Chungcheong: Yang Seung-jo
- North Jeolla: Song Ha-jin
- South Jeolla: Kim Yung-rok
- North Gyeongsang: Lee Cheol-woo
- South Gyeongsang: Kim Kyoung-soo
- Jeju: Won Hee-ryong

== Events ==
- April 7 – 2021 South Korean by-elections.
- April 13 – South Korean government protested and regretted the Japanese cabinet decision to dump radioactive water of the Fukushima nuclear plant into the Pacific Ocean.
- December 24 – The South Korean government pardons former president Park Geun-hye due to deteriorating health, also exonerating the first female prime minister Han Myeong-sook.

== Deaths ==
- January 5 – Kim Tschang-yeul, 91, South Korean painter.
- April 27 – Nicholas Cheong Jin-suk, 89, South Korean cardinal.
