= 2016 in North Korea =

- Centuries: 20th; 21st
- Decades: 1990s; 2000s; 2010s; 2020s
- See also: Other events of 2016; Years in North Korea; Timeline of Korean history 2016 in South Korea

In the year 2016, North Korea conducted two nuclear tests: one in January and the other in September. Additionally, the country conducted several missile tests. As consequence, the United Nations Security Council adopted three resolutions against North Korea.

The 7th Congress of the Workers' Party of Korea was held in May. In August North Korea took part in the 2016 Summer Olympics in Rio de Janeiro, Brazil, winning two gold, four silver, and two bronze medals.

== Incumbents ==
- Party Chairman and State Chairman: Kim Jong Un
- President of the Supreme People's Assembly: Kim Yong-nam
- Premier: Pak Pong-ju

== Events ==
=== January ===
- A 5.1 magnitude earthquake near Sungjibaegam, North Korea, was suspected to be a nuclear explosion at the Punggye-ri Nuclear Test Site. North Korea announced it had conducted a hydrogen bomb test (January 2016 North Korean nuclear test).

=== February ===
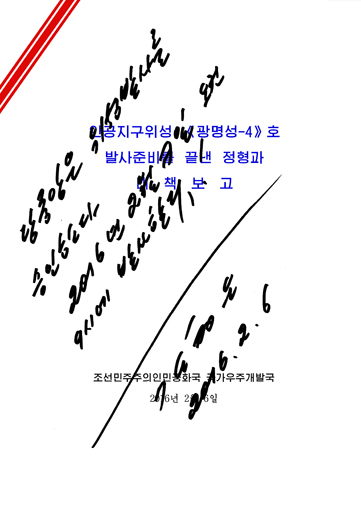
Kim Jong Un's written order on launching Kwangmyŏngsŏng-4

- The satellite Kwangmyŏngsŏng-4 was launched on 7 February on board the carrier rocket Kwangmyongsong.
- 7 February: S.K. began official consultations with the United States on THAAD missile defense deployment.
- 10 February: South Korea shuts down the joint Factory Park with North Korea, the Kaesong Industrial Park, over nuclear test and rocket.

=== March ===
- The United Nations Security Council unanimously adopts Resolution 2270 on 2 March, condemning the nuclear test and rocket launch by North Korea and imposing sanctions on it.
- The United Nations Security Council adopts Resolution 2276 on 24 March, extending the mandate of the Panel of Experts on North Korea's weapons of mass destruction until 24 April 2017.
- Security researchers have tied a recent spate of digital breaches on Asian banks to North Korea. If confirmed it would be the first known case of a nation using digital attacks for financial gain.

=== April ===
- 13 North Koreans working in a Korean restaurant in Ningbo, Zhejiang, China, defect and arrive in Seoul on 7 April.
- A test of the Musudan intermediate-range ballistic missile on 15 April (Day of the Sun) ends in failure.
- A submarine-launched missile is tested on 23 April but flies only 19 kilometres (12 mi).

=== May ===
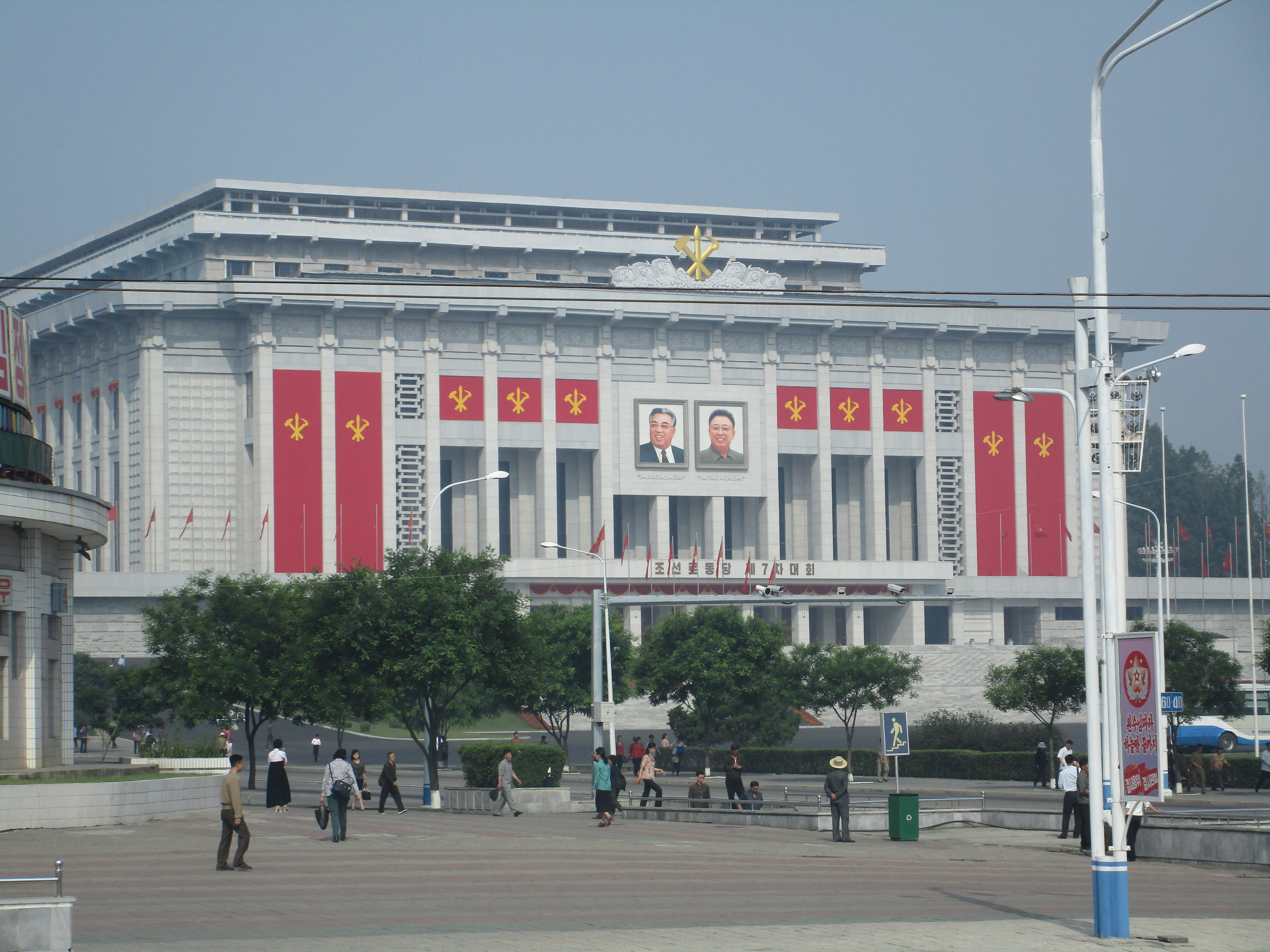
April 25 House of Culture decorated for the 7th Congress of the Workers' Party of Korea

- 7th Congress of the Workers' Party of Korea

=== August ===
- 3 August: North Korea fires a ballistic missile from South Hwanghae Province in the west of the country to the Sea of Japan.
- 11 August: Egypt customs seizes more than 30,000 rocket-propelled grenades of North Korean production, off a ship.
  - Egypt customs seized the cargo of ship Jie Shun, on arrival at Ain Sukhna port, Red Sea, on 11 Aug, after Egyptian authorities were alerted by the US intelligence on possible shipment of North Korean arms on board of this ship. The arms were hidden under bins of iron ore.
  - It was later revealed in 2017 that much to Egypt embarrassment, it was revealed later, that ammunitions actually, were bought by Egypt itself, against the UN sanctions imposed on North Korean arms trade. Later the Jie Shun was taken to Al Adabiyah port, berthed there on 27 Aug. Since 27 Aug and as of 2 October 2017, the ship stopped transmitting its Automatic identification system.
- 17 August: Thae Yong-ho, North Korea's deputy ambassador to Britain, defects.
- 25 August: North Korea makes a major technological breakthrough by launching a ballistic missile from a submarine near Sinpo. It flies about 300 miles before falling into the sea inside Japan's air defense identification zone.

=== September ===
- 9 September: N.K. conducts its fifth nuclear test, amid international condemnation.

=== November ===
- 30 November: The UN Security Council unanimously issued resolution 2321, strengthening its sanctions regime against the DPRK, in response to that country's 9 September nuclear test.

== Unknown ==
- In 2016, Christmas was celebrated in North Korea, but with the religious overtones downplayed.

== Sports ==
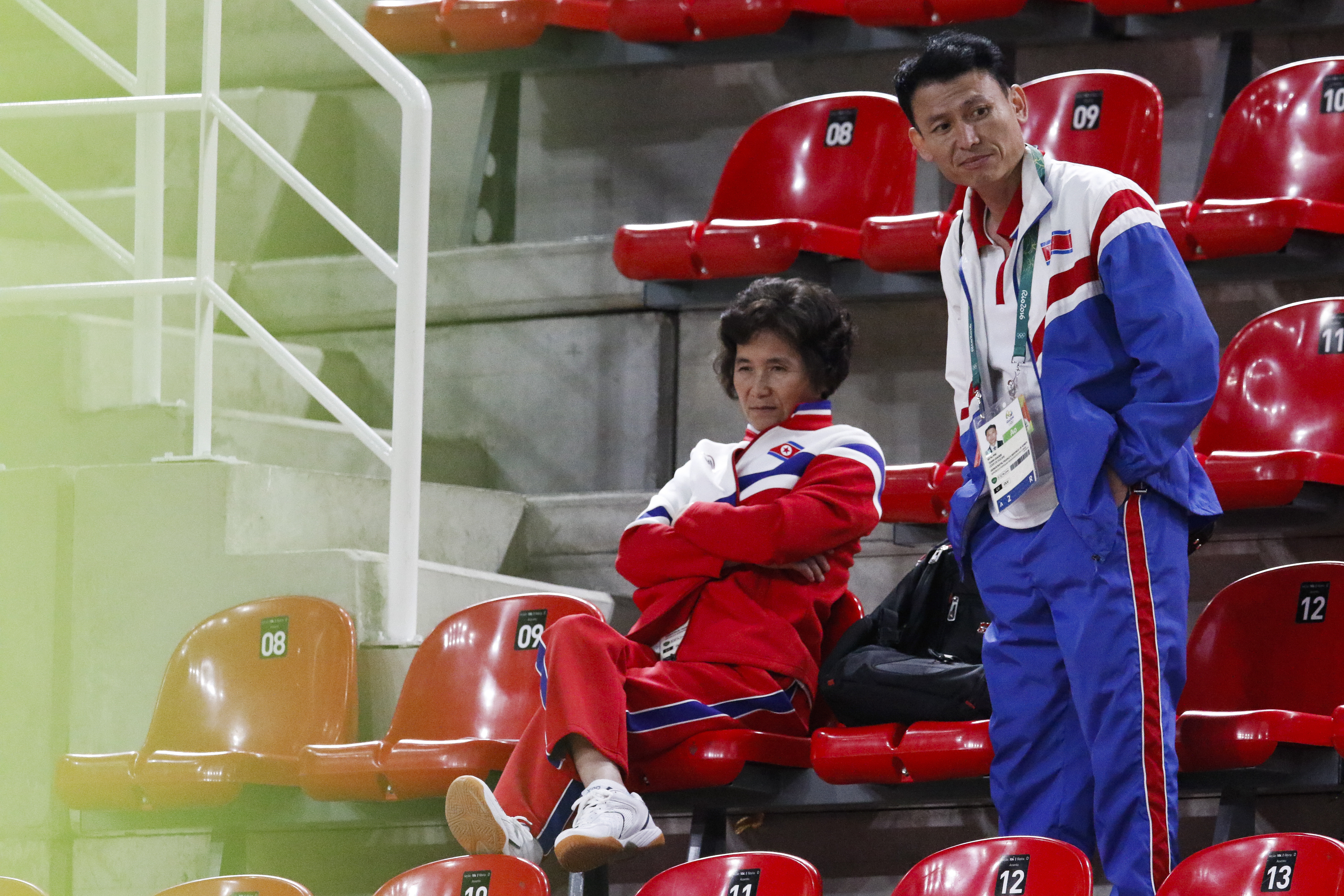
North Koreans observe a training session for gymnastics at the 2016 Summer Olympics.

- Pak Chol wins the Pyongyang Marathon in the men's professional event and Kim Ji-hyang in women's.
- August: North Korea wins two gold, four silver, and two bronze medals at the 2016 Summer Olympics in Rio de Janeiro, Brazil.
- World champions at the 2016 FIFA U-17 Women's World Cup and the 2016 FIFA U-20 Women's World Cup

== Deaths ==
- 20 May – Kang Sok-ju, Vice Premier of North Korea (b. 1939).
- 15 November – Pyon Yong-rip, former Secretary of the Standing Committee of the Supreme People's Assembly (b. 1929).
- 23 November – Ryu Mi-yong, former Chairwoman of the Chondoist Chongu Party (b. 1921).
- 28 November – Kim Myong-guk, army general in the Korean People's Army and member of the Central Military Commission of the Workers' Party of Korea (b. 1940).

== See also ==
- List of years in North Korea
