= 2018 in South Korea =

- Centuries: 20th; 21st
- Decades: 1990s; 2000s; 2010s; 2020s; 2030s
- See also: Other events of 2018; Years in South Korea; Timeline of Korean history 2018 in North Korea

Events in the year 2018 in South Korea.

== Incumbents ==
- President: Moon Jae-in
- Prime Minister: Lee Nak-yeon

=== Governors ===
- Gyeonggi: Lee Jae-myung
- Gangwon: Choi Moon-soon
- North Chungcheong: Lee Si-jong
- South Chungcheong: Yang Seung-jo
- North Jeolla: Song Ha-jin
- South Jeolla: Kim Yung-rok
- North Gyeongsang: Lee Cheol-woo
- South Gyeongsang: Kim Kyoung-soo
- Jeju: Won Hee-ryong

== Events ==
- 9 January – South Korea and North Korea held the first talks in decades at the Joint Security Area at the Panmunjom border village. North Korea agreed upon sending athletes to the 2018 Winter Olympics.
- 11 January – The South Korean government, along with China and Japan, announced plans to crack down on cryptocurrencies like Bitcoin. Bitcoin dropped in value by $2,000 after the announcement.
- 9 to 25 February – the 2018 Winter Olympics were hosted in Pyeongchang, South Korea
- April 5 – ROKAF F-15K Slam Eagle crashed in the Yuhak mountain range in Chilgok, Gyeongsangbuk-do, on its way back to the Daegu Air Base after an hour-long mission. Two F-15K pilots were killed in plane crash.
- April 13 – An opinion rigging scandal erupted. The scandal led to a major clash of political parties in South Korea.
- May 4 – A protest rally against abuse Korea Air called for Cho Yang-ho to resign.
- June 13 – The 2018 South Korean local and by-elections took place
- June 18 – United States called to suspended military exercise due lack of money, during after summit meeting US President Donald Trump with North Korea leader Kim Jong Un.
- July 12 – Refugees on Jeju Island: South Koreans protest against Yemen migrants in Jeju Island.
- 23 to 29 August – The 5th Carrom World Cup was held in Chuncheon.

== Deaths ==
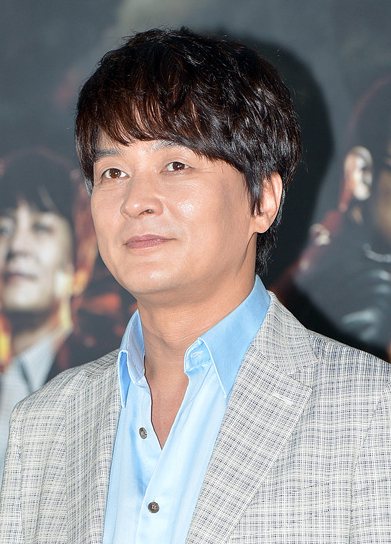
Jo Min-ki

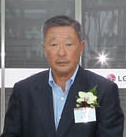
Koo Bon-moo

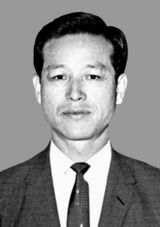
Kim Jong-pil

- 13 January — Jeon Ki-sang, television director (b. 1958).
- 21 January – Jun Tae-soo, actor (b.1984).
- 31 January – Hwang Byungki, gayageum player, composer and an authority on sanjo (b. 1936)
- 9 March – Jo Min-ki, actor (b. 1965)
- 16 March – Kwon Hee-deok, voice actress and writer (b. 1956)
- 20 May – Koo Bon-moo, business executive (b. 1945)
- 23 June – Kim Jong-pil, 9th Prime Minister of South Korea (b. 1926)

== See also ==
- List of South Korean films of 2018
- 2018 in South Korean music
- Years in South Korea
