= 2017 in South Korea =

- Centuries: 20th; 21st
- Decades: 1990s; 2000s; 2010s; 2020s; 2030s
- See also: Other events of 2017; Years in South Korea; Timeline of Korean history 2017 in North Korea

Events in the year 2017 in South Korea.

== Incumbents ==
- President:
  - Park Geun-hye (Powers and duties suspended as of December 9, 2016),
  - Hwang Kyo-ahn (Acting President as of December 9, 2016);
  - Moon Jae-in (since 10 May)
- Prime Minister:
  - until 11 May: Hwang Kyo-ahn
  - 11 May-31 May: Yoo Il-ho (acting)
  - starting 31 May: Lee Nak-yeon

=== Governors ===
- Gyeonggi: Nam Kyung-pil
- Gangwon: Choi Moon-soon
- North Chungcheong: Lee Si-jong
- South Chungcheong: An Hee-jung
- North Jeolla: Song Ha-jin
- South Jeolla: Lee Nak-yon
- North Gyeongsang: Kim Kwan-yong
- South Gyeongsang: Hong Joon-pyo
- Jeju: Won Hee-ryong

== Events ==
- 17 February – Hanjin Shipping was bankruptcy.
- 3 April – Lotte Corporation shoots off fireworks to celebrate its opening of the 123-floor Lotte World Tower in Seoul, South Korea. It is the tallest skyscraper in Korea and the 5th tallest in the world.
- 9 May – 2017 South Korean presidential election

== Deaths ==
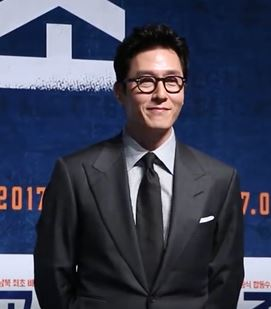
Kim Joo Hyuk

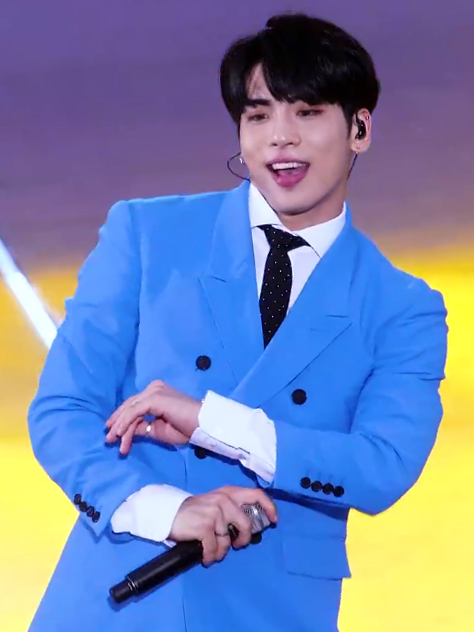
Kim Jonghyun

- 18 January – Jung Mi-Kyung, novelist (b. 1960)
- 30 October - Kim Joo-hyuk, actor (b. 1972)
- 18 December
  - Kim Jong-Hyun, lead singer, SHINee (b. 1990)
  - Choi Seo-In, comedian, (b. 1983)

== See also ==
- List of South Korean films of 2017
- 2017 in South Korean music
- 2017 in South Korean football
- Years in South Korea
