= 2019 in South Korea =

- Centuries: 20th; 21st
- Decades: 1990s; 2000s; 2010s; 2020s; 2030s
- See also: Other events of 2019; Years in South Korea; Timeline of Korean history 2019 in North Korea

2019 in South Korea was marked by significant political, economic, and social developments. The country continued to be governed by President Moon Jae-in and Prime Minister Lee Nak-yeon amid ongoing efforts to improve inter-Korean relations and address domestic economic challenges. During the year, relations with Japan deteriorated sharply following the outbreak of a trade dispute that affected exports of key industrial materials and led to diplomatic tensions between the two countries.

Major domestic events included the Constitutional Court's ruling that South Korea's abortion ban was unconstitutional, prompting plans for legal reform, as well as a series of high-profile political controversies and public demonstrations. The year also saw notable developments in South Korea's cultural sector and the deaths of several prominent public figures, including entertainers Sulli and Goo Hara. Collectively, these events made 2019 a consequential year in South Korea's recent political, economic, and social history.

== Incumbents ==
- President: Moon Jae-in
- Prime Minister: Lee Nak-yeon

=== Governors ===
- Gyeonggi: Lee Jae-myung
- Gangwon: Choi Moon-soon
- North Chungcheong: Lee Si-jong
- South Chungcheong: Yang Seung-jo
- North Jeolla: Song Ha-jin
- South Jeolla: Kim Yung-rok
- North Gyeongsang: Lee Cheol-woo
- South Gyeongsang: Kim Kyoung-soo
- Jeju: Won Hee-ryong

== Events ==
- April 3 – 2019 South Korean by-elections
- April 11 – A court rules 7–2 that a 1953 ban on abortion must be lifted.
- July 1 – Japan announces tightening of high-tech exports to South Korea, thus begin the trade dispute between the two countries.
- August 22 – South Korea announces that it will scrap its General Security of Military Information Agreement (GSOMIA) with Japan. The agreement had been due for automatic renewal on this month.
- August 28 – South Korea's Ministry of Foreign Affairs calls in the United States ambassador to South Korea, Harry B. Harris Jr., to tone down the United States' public criticism of South Korea's decision not to renew its General Security of Military Information Agreement (GSOMIA) with Japan.
- August 29 – The United States Ambassador to South Korea, Harry B. Harris Jr., is absent from the DMZ International Forum on the Peace Economy. And a reservist soldiers' Korean Veterans Association cancels Harris Jr.'s speech for the association's event. He attends the grand opening of a Shake Shack branch in Jongno, Seoul. The first Shake Shack in South Korea was opened in the Gangnam District of Seoul on July 22, 2016.

== Deaths ==
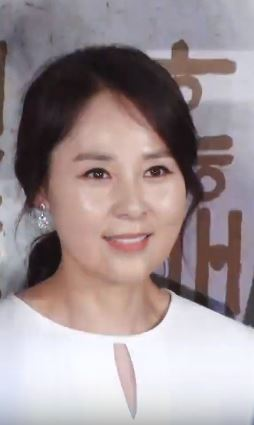
Jeon Mi Seon

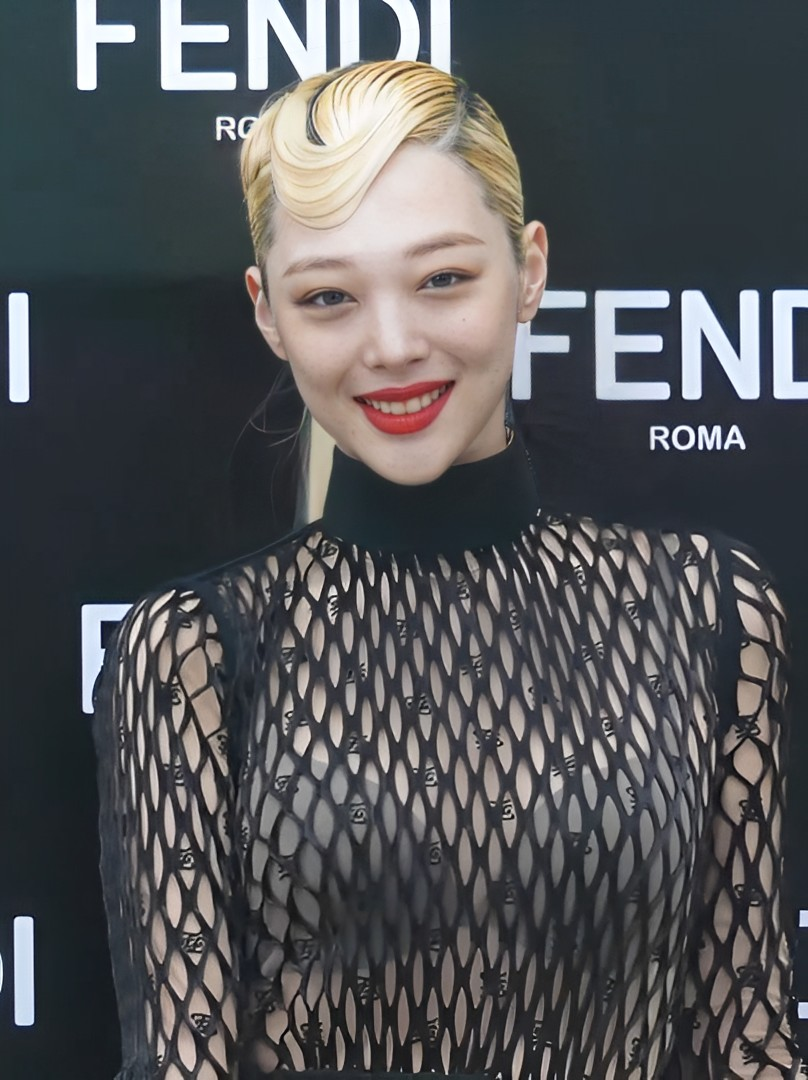
Sulli

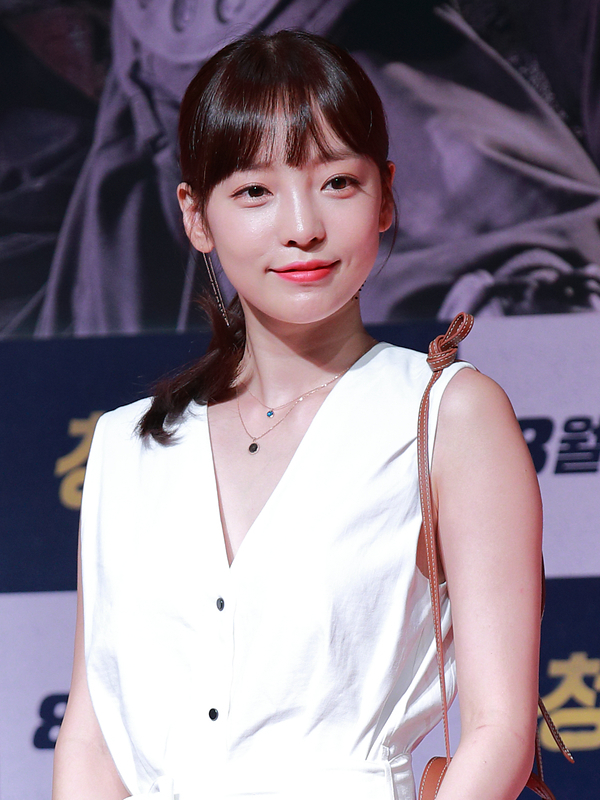
Goo Hara

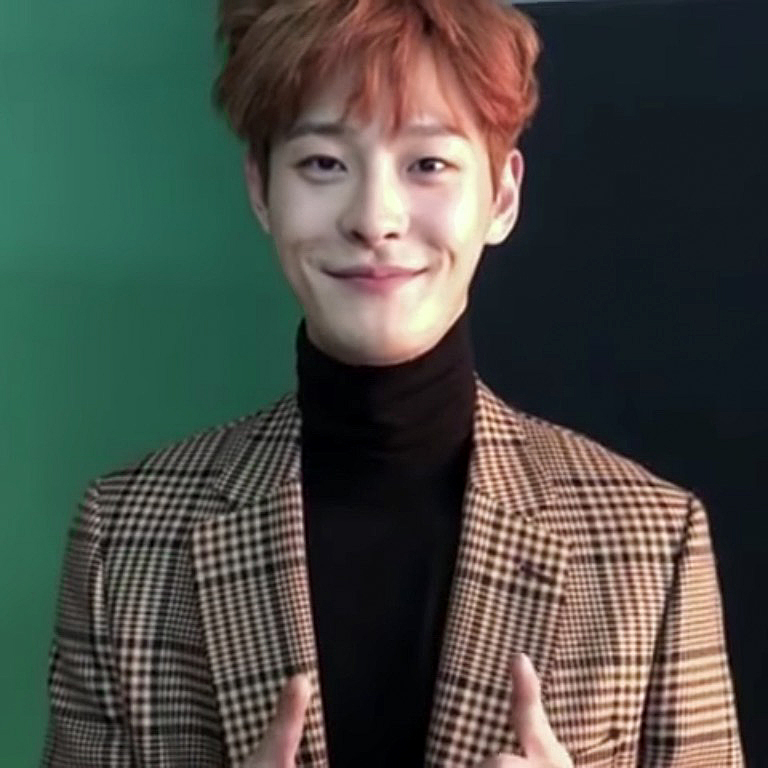
Cha in Ha

- January 28 – Kim Bok-dong, South-Korean women's rights activist (b. 1926).
- April 7 – Cho Yang-ho, South Korean businessman (b. 1949).
- April 21 - Gu Bon-im (February 2, 1969 – April 21, 2019): A film and theater actor, she died at the age of 50 due to nasopharyngeal cancer.
- June 10 – Lee Hee-ho, South Korean peace activist, 15th First Lady of South Korea (b. 1922).
- June 29 – Jeon Mi-seon, South Korean actress (b. 1970).
- July 16 – Chung Doo-un, South Korean politician (b. 1957).
- July 24 – Hwang Byungsng, Korean poet
- July 24 – Nam Gi-nam, Korean film director
- August 30 – Park Taesun, South Korean writer
- September 9 – Kim Seong-hwan, South Korean artist and cartoonist, notable for having created and perpetuated the longest-running comic strip in Korea.
- September 21 – Woo Hye-mi, Korean singer
- October 14 – Sulli, South Korean singer and actress (b. 1994)
- November 24 – Goo Hara, South Korean singer and actress (b. 1991)
- December 3 – Cha In-ha, South Korean actor (b.1992)
- December 9 – Kim Woo-jung. South Korean businessman who was the founder and chairman of the Daewoo Group
- December 14 – Koo Cha-kyung, South Korean business executive
