= 2017 in North Korea =

- Centuries: 20th; 21st
- Decades: 1990s; 2000s; 2010s; 2020s
- See also: Other events of 2017; Years in North Korea; Timeline of Korean history 2017 in South Korea

In the year 2017, North Korea was involved in the 2017 North Korea crisis, along with other events. The country conducted a nuclear test in September, and several missile tests throughout the year. One of these was the country's first successful test of an intercontinental ballistic missile (ICBM), Hwasong-14. Two missiles were launched over Hokkaido in the Japanese archipelago, in August and in September 2017.

== Incumbents ==
- Party Chairman and State Chairman: Kim Jong Un
- President of the Supreme People's Assembly: Kim Yong-nam
- Premier: Pak Pong-ju

== Events ==
=== Inclusion and organization of events ===
This timeline categorizes 2017 events relevant to North Korea in two groups: North Korea's own actions and internal developments (left column), and the international community interacting or reacting to North Korea (right column). For example, if North Korea launches a missile, that is an event originating in North Korea and would be nested on the left side. And when the United Nations Security Council approves a resolution admonishing North Korea in connection with its tests, that is an event originating from an outside entity but directly relevant to the country, and is listed on the right side.

Note that the dates mostly reflect the publication of the news. News that span more than one day are usually listed according to the earliest day the event begun or was reported, or, they are listed by month but not by day.

=== January ===
| North Korea | South Korea and International |
|---|---|
| Jan 1: Kim Jong-Un makes his fifth New Year's Day speech.; Jan 1: Kim Jong Un said his country is in the “last stage” of preparations to test-fire an intercontinental ballistic missile (ICBM).; Jan 11: S.K. white paper reports that N.K. has 50 kg of weapons-grade plutonium.; Jan 18: N.K. distributes new manual on broad photography restrictions to foreign diplomats.; Jan 18: Following Kim Jong Un's New Year's Day Address outline, a N.K. government conference on implementing the tasks for reunification is held in Pyongyang.; Jan 18: S.K. and other intelligence agencies deem a N.K. ICBM test more likely in the short term. Two new ICBM models seem to have been detected by foreign intelligence agencies.; Jan 18: Recent satellite imagery suggests that Yongbyon Nuclear Scientific Research Center, which reprocesses plutonium, may have resumed operations.; 2008 photograph of the Yongbyon 5MWe Magnox reactor: Jan 23: A new bridge is under construction between China's Tumen City and N.K.’s Namyang City. The bridge is near Rason Port and Chongjin Port, two gateways used by China.; Jan 25: Satellite imagery confirms Chinese oil rig in N.K's exclusive economic zone (EEZ). In 2015 imagery had already revealed another one.; Jan 30: N.K. is reported to be strengthening its measures to limit defections across the border with China, by using more unmanned detection devises, more including infrared cameras.; Jan 30: Russian and N.K. officials sign a memorandum of understanding on a program to train North Korean students in the field of railway transport at Russian universities. | Jan: U.S. provides humanitarian aid to N.K. for the first time since 2011, despite nuclear tensions.; Jan 1: The United States condemns N.K.’s claims it will test-fire an intercontinental ballistic missile and warned Pyongyang against “provocative actions.”; Jan 2: S. Korean Navy conducts new year maritime drill amid N.K. threats.; Jan 4: China reportedly lifts ban on N.K.'s coal, its largest export. The ban had been imposed in compliance with UN Security Council resolution 2321 in reaction to N.K.'s fifth nuclear test. The U.N. launches a new website section to monitor N.K. coal exports, designed to increase accountability and UNSC resolutions compliance among U.N. member states.; Jan 5: S.K. begins conducting investigations of N.K. human rights violations in compliance with a new law, to build a database of N.K. rights violators.; Jan 6: S.K. accuses China of retaliating against South Korea's planned deployment of THAAD deployment (U.S. anti-missile defense system for mid-range missiles; North Korea mid-range missiles could reach any part of South Korea, and some parts of Japan). These include economic retaliations, as well as canceling seven joint military events between S.K. and China.; Example of a Terminal High Altitude Area Defense (THAAD) interceptors being launched during a test - US Army. THAAD is designed to intercept medium-range missiles: Jan 10: A sea-based U.S. military radar leaves Hawaii to monitor for potential North Korean intercontinental ballistic missile test launches.; Jan 11: N.K. had recently hacked several S.K. government agencies, defectors, analysts, NGOs, and companies.; Jan 16: China increases pressure to dissuade S.K. from deploying THAAD, and it becomes a divisive electoral issue in S.K.; Jan 17: Japan to launch a missile defense satellite (Kirameki No. 2) to upgrade the country's surveillance network that can detect and track North Korea missile launches.; Jan 24: S.K.'s Ministry of Unification launches an advisory body to help the government set up its policy on N.K.'s human rights, in accordance with a new law aimed at improving the way N.K. treats its people.; Jan 25: China releases a new, comprehensive list of goods that can not be exported to N.K., including dual-use.; Jan 25: Transparency International ranks N.K. as world's third most corrupt nation.; Jan 26: Following accusations of non-compliance with UN-imposed sanctions, China claims that it is enforcing sanctions against importing coal from N.K.; Jan 29: U.S President Trump expressed his “ironclad” commitment to the continued defense of S.K. against N.K., in a phone conversation with S.K. acting president. This pronouncement comes after months of Trump's candidacy stirring uncertainty as to his policies towards U.S.' East-Asian allies. |

=== February ===
| North Korea | South Korea and International |
|---|---|
| Feb 3: General Kim Won Hong, head of state security, was dismissed on charges of corruption and abuse of power.; Feb 11: N.K. test-fires a new intermediate-range ballistic missile, the Pukkuksong-2, continuing to develop its rocket technology, in defiance of the international community's opposition.; In contrast to older, liquid-fueled rockets that take hours to prepare for launch and are easier to detect counteract by other countries, the Pukkuksong-2 is a solid-fuel rocket that can be launched in minutes.; Feb 17: N.K. reacts to Malaysian inquiries on Kim Jong-nam's murder investigation, by accusing the Malaysian government to plot against N.K., and relations become strained. Both countries recall their respective ambassadors.; Feb 20: N.K. repeatedly refuses to confirm the identity of the deceased Kim Jong-nam, or to cooperate in the murder's investigations. It requests the body, and protests Malaysia conducting an autopsy.; Feb 27: A U.N. panel of experts in its annual review, reports that N.K. has been partnering with at least seven African nations to train soldiers, build infrastructure and sell a wide range of weapons and vehicles.; It also concluded that N.K. is “flouting” UN sanctions by trading in prohibited goods with evasion techniques that are increasing in scale, scope and sophistication, mostly via China. | Feb 1: Freedom House ranks N.K. among the worst violators of human rights in the world.; Feb 2: A top official of the new U.S. administration (Defense Secretary Jim Mattis) visits South Korea and Japan for the first time since the beginning of the U.S. new administration, reaffirming the strong alliances, emphasizing protection against N.K's nuclear threat.; U.S. Defense Secretary Jim Mattis meets with ROK National Security Advisor Kim Kwan-jin during a visit to Seoul, South Korea, Feb. 02, 2017.: Feb 2: The interim S.K. government and U.S. reaffirm their intent to push ahead with the deployment the THAAD missile defense system. Opposition leaders in Seoul continue opposing the THAAD as they say it would do little to defend South Korea from the North's plentiful short-range missiles but would anger China.; Feb 11: North Korea's missile test of Feb 11 was of a lower range than first feared after Kim Jong Un's pronouncements on early January; the test turned not to be of a long-range missile (ICBM), but just an intermediate range.; The test happened while Japanese prime minister Abe and U.S. president Trump were meeting. Trump pledged continued support for Japan, and said little about N.K., displaying unusual restraint.; Feb 13: UN Security Council unanimously condemns N.K.'s missile test; Feb 14: Kim Jong-nam, eldest son of Kim Jong Il and a half-brother of Kim Jong Un, is assassinated in an airport in Malaysia when two women expose him to a poison.; Feb 15: The suspect women are arrested, and identified as Vietnamese and Indonesian. They claimed they were duped and thought they were just carrying out a joke. The Police later reports that the women had practiced the attack at two malls.; Feb 15: Malaysia lists at least 11 suspects, including 6 North Korean citizens. A senior North Korean diplomat is also wanted for questioning, but N.K. refuses.; Feb 17: South Korean reports that Kim Jong-nam's assassination could be conducted by North Korea, prompt Malaysian officials to deepen their investigation.; Feb 23: Kim Jong-nam's autopsy reveals he died from exposure to VX nerve agent, the deadliest nerve agent ever synthesized, and labelled as a weapon of mass destruction that is banned under the Chemical Weapons Convention. N.K. protests the autopsy being conducted and rejects its findings.; Mar 1: Analysts suggest that Kim Jong-nam might have been assassinated to deprive China of an alternative N.K. leader to replace Kim Jong Un.; Feb 18: China announces complete ban of coal imports from N.K. The ban will be in place until the end of the year, in an effort to curtail N.K.'s nuclear ambitions, and possibly as retaliation for the assassination of Kim Jong-nam, thought to have friendly ties to China.; In recent years coal exports have accounted for about 40% of all N.K. international trade. China had previously claimed compliance with the UNSC resolutions, but it allowed some exemptions and deliveries continued. |

=== March ===
| North Korea | South Korea and International |
|---|---|
| Mar 3: North Korea has finished construction of a new hydropower plant in North Hwanghae Province.; Mar 5: N.K. declares Malaysia's ambassador persona non grata and had ordered him to leave.; North Korean Unha-3 rocket at launch pad, Sohae Satellite Launching Station, from where the latest launch-test may have happened: Mar 6: N.K. launches four ballistic missiles. The missiles took off from Tongchang-ri, in the Northwest, and some flew 620 miles before falling into the sea between N.K. and Japan. The move prompted US Secretary of State Rex Tillerson to embark on a diplomatic mission ten days later to Japan, South Korea and China, in an effort to resolve the heightened international tension in the region S.K. defense officials later said the projectiles were Scud-ER ballistic missiles with a 620-mile range.; Mar 7: N.K. bans all Malaysians from leaving its soil, as retaliations escalate over diplomatic rift after Kim Jong-nam's death.; Mar 9: N.K. allows two Malaysian employees of the United Nations' World Food Program to leave the country, while 9 remain retained.; Mar 10: Commercial satellite imagery reveals that N.K. is continuing to excavate a tunnel at its Punggye-ri Nuclear Test Site, which may support an explosion up to 14 times more powerful than its last test.; While the 5th nuclear test (2016) was estimated as 15-20 kilotons, the site is now ready to test up to 282 kilotons.; Mar 13: N.K. boycotts a U.N. review of its human rights record.; Mar 16: It is reported that the number of official markets in North Korea has been quickly growing (under the connivance of the authorities).; Mar 17: It is reported that Kim Jong Un instructed Ministry of State Security officials to refrain from threatening people in order to extort bribes. It is unclear why and how long this new policy will last.; Mar 19: N.K. claims that it conducted a successful ground jet test of a newly developed high-thrust missile engine. This could be progress towards developing an ICBM.; Mar 20: Some reports say that prices for market goods are fluctuating. This may be an indicator of the State's losing princing control, in favor of market forces.; March 22: N.K. fires a missile off its east coast on Wednesday, but the test apparently fails.; Mar 23: In two among numerous recurrent statements, N.K. vows to continue to take nuclear deterrent steps against the U.S.' hard-line policy toward it.; In part N.K. says this is in response to South Korea-U.S. joint military drills taking place in March.; For the first time N.K. also said that it had been testing missile launch drills regularly, and that it would continue to do so.; Mar 24: S.K. officials say that N.K. is all set for its 6th nuclear test.; Mar 25: More reports point to N.K. has been increasingly hacking numerous financial institutions. S.K. officials estimate that N.K.'s "hacking network is immense, encompassing a group of 1,700 hackers", which are based outside N.K. They are reported to have shifted the hacking focus to making money, attacking banks and private companies, apparently because the North's other means of raising foreign currency are increasingly blocked under United Nations sanctions. | Mar 1: S.K. and U.S. kick-off their annual, month long joint military training exercise involving ground, air and naval forces. N.K. hints it may react with more missile tests.; Mar 2: Malaysia scraps visa-free entry for North Koreans.; Mar 4: The New York Times reports that three years earlier, U.S. President Obama ordered Pentagon officials to intensify cyber and electronic strikes against North Korea's missile program in hopes of sabotaging test launches in their opening seconds.; Mar 4: The government of Malaysia expels North Korea's ambassador, after a major break in diplomatic relations following the assassination of Kim Jong-nam. The ambassador had made inflammatory accusations and had refused to be questioned in connection with Kim's death.; Mar 5: The S.K. Ministry of Unification announces plans to increase payment for N.K. defectors who provide valuable information concerning "national security".; Mar 6: Deployment of the U.S. THAAD missile defense in S.K. is progressing, and China continues to protest and economically retaliate against S.K.; Mar 7: Chinese telecom equipment maker ZTE Corp agrees to plead guilty and pay nearly $900 million in a U.S. sanctions case.; A U.S. investigation found that ZTE conspired to evade U.S. embargoes by buying U.S. components, incorporating them into ZTE equipment and illegally shipping them to Iran. In addition, it was charged in connection with 283 shipments of telecommunications equipment to N.K.; This was the largest civil penalty ever levied in a Commerce export control case. The investigation was triggered by Reuters' investigative journalism.; Mar 8: North Korean banks subject to international sanctions have recently been banned by Swift from using its global financial messaging service, after Swift was caught in violation of sanctions by the UN.; Seven blacklisted North Korean banks had continued to use the Swift network in recent years despite the UN Security Council sanctions. Later, four had voluntarily withdrawn, leaving three banks identified as Bank of East Land, Korea Daesong Bank and Korea Kwangson Banking Corp. UN investigators uncovered evidence that the North Korean banks had continued to use Swift's services despite being subjected to UN sanctions. Upon publication of the UN report, Belgian authorities ordered Swift to ban those banks from using its services.; However, the tighter enforcement of these sanctions may be ineffectual if China continues to allow N.K. to move funds between the two countries.; Mar 14: The Wall Street Journal reported that despite U.S. sanctions four N.K. banks still remain connected with the international financial system through Swift.; These banks are: Foreign Trade Bank, Kumgang Bank, Koryo Credit Development Bank, and North East Asia Bank.; The loophole was possible because Swift is required by law to comply with U.N. sanctions, but doesn't have to abide by U.S. law if its activities do not fall under U.S. jurisdiction, the report said.; Mar 13: After the one-year anniversary of the S.K.'s new North Korean Human Rights Law, its centerpiece North Korean Human Rights Foundation (designed to act as a bridge between the human rights NGOs and the Unification Ministry), is yet to be created due to political divisions.; U.S. Secretary of State Rex Tillerson and South Korean Foreign Minister Yun Address Reporters in Seoul Secretary Tillerson Poses for Photo With U.S. and ROK Forces During Visit to the Joint Security Area of the DMZ. Note that the foreground is S.K. territory, and the background N.K. territory: Mar 15: Malaysia says DNA sample confirms murdered Kim Jong Nam's identity. N.K. accused of the murder, has denied the victim was Kim Jong Nam.; Mar 16: Malaysia prepares to deport 50 North Koreans (out of a total of 315 staying in the country), detained by the government for overstaying their visas.; Mar 17: The U.S. Secretary of State visits Seoul.; He stated that two decades of international efforts to end the North's nuclear weapons and missile programs had failed, and noted that "the policy of strategic patience has ended”.; However, analysts doubt that other, new policy options are available. The policy in fact continues to consist of military deterrence, economic sanctions and diplomatic isolation.; He explicitly rejected any return to the bargaining table in an effort to buy time by halting North Korea's accelerating testing program (continuing this same policy from Obama's administration). Negotiations “can only be achieved by denuclearizing, giving up their weapons of mass destruction,” he said — a step to which the North committed in 1992, and again in subsequent accords, but has always violated. “Only then will we be prepared to engage them in talks.”; He warned that all options should be on the table to stop them, including possible pre-emptive military action “if they elevate the threat of their weapons program” to an unacceptable level.; Mar 19: The U.S. Secretary of State visits China. N.K. issues are prominent in talks, but no new agreements come out of it. Disagreements over THAAD continue, and China's economic retaliation for it against S.K., continue.; Mar 22: It is reported that the U.S. is investigating N.K.'s possible role in the theft of $81 million from the central bank of Bangladesh in 2016, in what security officials fear could be a new front in cyberwarfare.; Mar 24:The UN Human Rights Council adopts a resolution to authorize the use of criminal justice experts to devise legal strategies for eventual prosecutions of violations by NK. This follows an in-depth 2014 human rights report that recommended prosecution. Actual prosecution remains uncertain.; Mar 30: Kim Jong-nam's body is released by Malaysia to N.K. Negotiations between the two countries also resulted a reduction of diplomatic tensions, the release of the 9 Malaysian citizens retained in N.K., and N.K. citizens in Malaysia also being allowed to travel to their home country. |

=== April ===
| North Korea | South Korea and International |
|---|---|
| Apr 2: Report indicates that Pyongyang is seeing a construction boom of skyscrapers and apartment buildings.; Apr 4: N.K. test-fires another intermediate range ballistic missile, a day before a U.S.-China summit.; Apr 6: N.K. called the U.S. strike on Syria an "intolerable act of aggression against a sovereign state", and said the strike showed it was justified in bolstering its own defenses.; Participants in a prior edition of the Pyongyang Marathon, running past the Arch of Triumph: Apr 9: N.K. holds its annual international marathon in Pyongyang.; Apr 11: N.K. announces its readiness to declare war on the U.S. after the country previously stated that they felt threatened as U.S. military forces approach the Korean Peninsula.; Apr 12: New satellite images suggest that N.K. might soon conduct another underground detonation in its effort to learn how to make nuclear arms, it would be its 6th test.; Estimates that N.K. may soon test a nuclear device are strengthened by the proximity to April 15, a national day in N.K. that commemorates the birth of Kim Il Sung, and that in prior years has been highlighted with a nuclear test or missile test.; A ballistic missile Tank Example of a military parade from the North Korea Victory Day (celebrated on July 27) in 2013, and 2015 respectively.: Apr 15: N.K. celebrates the Day of the Sun, 105th birthday of Kim's grandfather, the country's founder-president, Kim Il Sung. In a major military parade in Pyongyang, N.K. displayed its long-range missiles. N.K. does not carry out another nuclear test or ballistic missile launch, against widespread speculation that it would seek to do so on this day.; Apr 16: N.K. attempts to launch a ballistic missile test from its east coast, but fails.; Apr 29: N.K. tests another missile, which also fails shortly after launch. | Apr 5: U.S. Treasury issued an alert to financial institutions about the results of an intergovernmental meeting that blacklisted North Korea as a money laundering concern. The alert follows a measure taken by the Treasury's Financial Crimes Enforcement Network in 2016, that identified North Korea as a jurisdiction of money laundering concern under the USA Patriot Act.; Apr 5: China arrests South Korean pastors for helping North Koreans flee the regime.; Apr 5: U.S. Secretary of States react's to N.K. latest missile test with a brief a cryptic statement: "North Korea launched yet another intermediate range ballistic missile. The United States has spoken enough about North Korea. We have no further comment.". In a phone call to prime minister Shinzo Abe, U.S. president Trump promises to boost US military capabilities after Pyongyang fired ballistic missile.; Apr 6: Mongolia deregisters more North Korean vessels, following UN Security Council Resolution 2321.; Apr 6: U.S. bombs Syria to punish the regime's use of chemical weapons. It is also seen as the Trump administration signaling N.K. its willingness to use military force to compel N.K. to stop its development of nuclear bombing capabilities.; Apr 7: China and U.S. leaders Trump and Xi meet. Trump seeks Xi's cooperation in dealing with N.K., but states he is prepared to act alone. No specific commitments resulted from this meeting.; Apr 8: The U.S. announces the rerouting of the Carl Vinson Strike Group (consisting of an aircraft carrier and other warships) from its original planned route from Singapore to Australia, to the West Pacific, near the Korean Peninsula.; This is in response to N.K.'s recent nuclear and missile tests, which the U.S. calls "The number one threat in the region", and discourage further tests. There are also recent indications from North Korea that it may about to test an intercontinental missile.; April 11: Reacting to worries and conjecture spreading in S.K. of a possible pre-emptive American military strike on nuclear-armed N.K., the government sought to reassure citizens that there would be no such attack without its consent.; Apr 12: China orders its military to be on nationwide alert and ready to move, in areas North Korea border, as tensions escalate on the peninsula.; Apr 12: China's leader Xi calls U.S. President Trump to advocate for a "peaceful resolution" in tensions with N.K.; Apr 13: Trump warns N.K. to back down from a soon-expected nuclear test. Trump's remark are taken as a threat of military action against the North.; Apr 14: The Chinese government is reported to be strengthening its diplomatic efforts to defuse tensions between N.K. and the U.S. China's foreign minister Wang Yi states that “The United States and South Korea and North Korea are engaging in tit for tat, with swords drawn and bows bent, and there have been storm clouds gathering”.; Photograph of USS Carl Vinson on April 15, 2017, published by the U.S. Navy, showing the aircraft carrier crossing the Sunda Strait, sailing in the opposite direction to the Korean Peninsula.: Apr 18: It is revealed that when the Carl Vinson carrier group was announced on April 8 to be heading to the Korean peninsula as a deterrent to N.K., due to a "glitch-ridden sequence of events" it was actually heading in the opposite direction. Finally, it did change course and start heading there, with an arrival expected a week later. |

=== May ===
| North Korea | South Korea and International |
|---|---|
| May 3: N.K. confirms the detention of Tony Kim during a visit to Pyongyang. He is an American teacher at Yanbian University of Science and Technology.; May 13: N.K. launches an intermediate range missile, the first after the South's elections. It was launched from Kusong. N.K. claimed the missile was capable of carrying a nuclear head.; May 21: N.K. fires a medium-range ballistic missile. It was launched from near Pukchang.; May 28: N.K. fired another missile, flying 280 miles, and landing on the sea, inside Japan's economic zone waters. | May 2: U.S. antimissile system (Terminal High Altitude Area Defense, or THAAD) in South Korea becomes operational.; New ROK president Moon Jae-in, in May 2017: May 10: South Korea elects new president, Moon Jae-in. He announces a change of policy towards N.K., towards more engagement, reminiscent of the sunshine policy.; The election followed after President Park Geun-hye was removed from office due to an alleged corruption scandal.; May 12: A global cyberattack affects thousands of computers and organizations worldwide. The hackers used a tool stolen from the U.S.' National Security Agency.; May 22: Suspicions mount that the attack may have originated from North Korea. Similarities are found with the 2014 Sony Pictures hack.; May 30: U.S. conducts a successful missile defense test. A re-engineered American interceptor rocket collided with a mock intercontinental ballistic missile over the Pacific Ocean. |

=== June ===
| North Korea | South Korea and International |
|---|---|
| Jun 5: N.K. showcases fighter jets and helicopters in annual air contest.; Jun 8: N.K has fired four anti-ship missiles off its east coast, near the port city of Wonsan.; Jun 13: N.K. releases U.S. citizen Otto Warmbier, detained 17 months earlier while visiting the country with a tourist group. He is reported to be in a coma.; Jun 19: Warmbier, who had sustained a catastrophic brain injury shortly after his conviction in N.K., dies seven days after his return to the U.S. | President Donald J. Trump welcomes President Moon Jae-in to the White House: Jun 7: S.K. President Moon Jae-in suspends further THAAD deployment pending a review, after discovering four addition launchers had entered S.K. without the defense ministry informing him.; Jun 18: N.K. protests the seizure by U.S. Homeland Security of a package carried by N.K. citizens that were about to take a flight from New York. N.K. nor the U.S. explained the contents of the package, but the U.S. stated that those citizens did not have diplomatic immunity.; Jun 20: The package is returned to N.K.; Jun 30: S.K. President Moon Jae-in met with U.S. President Trump. The latter reaffirmed the American security alliance with S.K. against the threat of a nuclear-armed N.K. But he showed little patience for Mr. Moon's hope for engagement with the North — something analysts said could be a future source of friction between the leaders. |

=== July ===
| North Korea | South Korea and International |
|---|---|
| Jul 4: N.K. successfully conducts its first test of an intercontinental ballistic missile (ICBM), named Hwasong-14.; This is a milestone in its efforts to build a nuclear weapon capable of reaching the United States mainland. The ICBM was launched from Kusong.; Jul 28: N.K. launches a second Hwasong-14 ICBM which flew for 45 minutes with an apogee of 3725 km and traveled 998 km, landing in Japanese waters.; Jul 19: Activists affiliated with the Transitional Justice Working Group (a human rights group based in Seoul), announce findings identifying more than 300 sites in N.K. where executions are thought to have occurred and 47 sites believed to have hosted cremations and burials.; Jul 20: Recent media reports indicate that N.K.’s sole SINPO-class experimental ballistic missile submarine (SSBA) has been engaged in unusual deployment activity’ over the past 48 hours, sailing approximately 100-km out from Sinpo into the Sea of Japan.; If correct, this would be the submarine's longest known voyage to date.; While there are several possible explanations, the most likely is preparations for a test in the near future of an updated Pukkuksong-1 (KN-11) submarine-launched ballistic missile (SLBM) or a potentially newer system. | Jul 3: The New York Times reports that U.S. President Trump is "frustrated by China’s unwillingness to lean on North Korea" to halt its nuclear development program.; Efforts by Trump to soften its position on China-U.S. relations did not bear fruit. Instead, the U.S. administration hardened its approach by: Selling weapons to Taiwan; blacklisting multiple Chinese banks and companies that do business with N.K.; labeling China one of the worst offenders in an annual State Department report on human trafficking; and by the U.S. Navy asserting freedom of navigation by; a destroyer sailing near disputed territory claimed by China in the South China Sea.: Jul 28: President Moon orders talks with U.S. to deploy more THAAD units after North Korea ICBM test; Jul 29: ROK and US fired missiles in response to the test. |

=== August ===
| North Korea | South Korea and International |
|---|---|
| Aug 7: In a Southeast Asian diplomatic meeting, N.K. Foreign Minister Ri Yong-ho conducts a round of multiparty bargaining sessions with his counterparts from China, South Korea and Russia, for the first time in 8 years. The meetings did not seem to yield any results.; Aug 26: N.K. fires several short-range missiles from its east coast, landing in the Sea of Japan.; The launches occurred during a period of escalating tensions between Pyongyang and Washington. American and South Korean forces began twice-yearly war games six days earlier, aimed at preparing for a possible attack by the North.; This was the 12th missile test by N.K. in 2017.; Aug 29: N.K. fires a ballistic missile.; Unlike prior tests, this missile flew over Japan. It was launched from the vicinity of Pyongyang, flew for 1,700 miles, and splashed in the Pacific hundreds of miles off the eastern coast of Japan.; The missile was at an altitude in excess of 400 kilometres (250 mi) over Japan.; While there is no international treaty that clarifies the upper limits of the national airspace of countries, as a point of reference the U.S. considers anyone who has flown above 50 miles (80 km) to be an astronaut; with descending space shuttles have flown closer than 80 km over other nations without requesting permission first. | Example of a UN Security Council meeting. The image is of an April 28 meeting chaired by U.S. Secretary Tillerson, on Denuclearization of the DPRK: Aug 5: The UN Security Council unanimously adopts resolution 2371, toughening economic sanctions on N.K. This is the sixth tightening of sanctions since the UN first imposed them in 2006.; 2013 picture of the US-ROK annual joint exercise called Key Resolve. The image shows ROK Special Warfare Flotilla and U.S. SEAL Team 17 preparing to conduct a visit, board, search and seizure (VBSS): Aug 8: N.K.’s rapidly advancing nuclear program is prompting politicians in Japan and S.K. to push for the deployment of more powerful weapons, in what could lead to a regional arms race.; Aug 21: The US and S.K. begin their annual joint military exercises, while N.K. warns that the drills would deepen tensions.; Aug 8: U.S. President Trump, in a statement considered improvised and bombastic but also surprising, asserts he will meet further provocations and threats to the U.S. “with fire and fury like the world has never seen”.; Aug 14: Experts estimate that N.K.’s recent success in testing an ICBMs that appears able to reach the U.S. was made possible by black-market purchases of powerful rocket engines probably from a Ukrainian factory with historical ties to Russia’s missile program.; A 2014 report by the Carnegie Endowment for International Peace had forewarned of that risk.; Aug 29: In reaction to N.K.'s launch of a missile that flies over the Hokkaido island in northern Japan, the Japanese government sends a text alert to its citizens about the launch and advises them to take protective cover.; Aug 29: Japan's Prime Minister Abe, who has long pursued to modifying its constitution, end the country's pacifist policy, and be able boost the military might, gains more support due to N.K. belligerence.; Aug 30: The New York Times reports how experts on N.K. see the country angling "to bring the danger and tension to a crescendo, and then to pivot to a peace proposal" that U.S. President Trump may unexpectedly accept and make large concessions in the process.; To N.K., the U.S. can offer a peace treaty, diplomatic recognition, the easing of decades-old sanctions and the withdrawal of American troops from S.K., which Pyongyang considers its existential threat. |

=== September ===
| North Korea | South Korea and International |
|---|---|
| Sep 3: N.K. claims it has developed a more advanced nuclear weapon that has “great destructive power”, and that leader Kim Jong Un has inspected a hydrogen bomb that will be loaded on to a new intercontinental ballistic missile.; This announcement is made hours before an underground nuclear test.; Graphic from the United States Geological Survey showing the location of seismic activity at the time of the test, which caused an earthquake of 6.3-magnitude.: Sep 3: N.K. conducts another underground nuclear test. This was N.K's 6th nuclear test since its first one a decade earlier.; The underground blast was by far North Korea's most powerful ever. Experts estimated that the blast was of about 140 kilotons, or 4 to 16 times more powerful than any the North had set off before, making experts wonder whether the North had set off a thermonuclear bomb.; The explosion caused tremors that were felt in South Korea and China. The news of the test were first revealed by seismic authorities that detected an artificial earthquake near the Pyongyang regime's known nuclear test site.; Shortly after the test, N.K. claimed that it had indeed tested successfully a hydrogen bomb, which involved a “two-stage thermonuclear weapon”, capable of being loaded on to an intercontinental ballistic missile.; Sep 4: S.K. officials said that they had seen evidence that North Korea may be preparing another test, likely of an intercontinental ballistic missile.; Sep 15: N.K. test-launches another missile that flies over Japan.; The missile flew over Japan and landed in the sea some 1,200 miles east of Hokkaido.; Sep 25: N.K.'s foreign minister states that Trump's comments suggesting he would eradicate N.K. and its leaders are “a declaration of war.”; He also asserts that his country has the right to defend itself by shooting down U.S. planes, even if they are not in the country's airspace.; N.B.: For historical perspective note that N.K. has made similar bellicose remarks in the past. For example, in 2013 N.K. declared void the Korean Armistice (which effectively put an end to the Korean War of 1950–1953).; Sep 28: 38 North reports that satellite imagery from September 1 and 21, indicate that N.K. continues to work on its second submersible ballistic missile test stand barge at the Nampo Navy Shipyard. | Sep 1: President Vladimir Putin warns President Donald Trump not apply too much pressure on North Korea's nuclear program, saying the strained relationship between the two countries was “on the verge of a large-scale conflict.”; Sep 3: North Korea's detonation of a sixth nuclear bomb on Sunday prompted the Trump administration to warn that even the threat to use such a weapon against the United States and its allies “will be met with a massive military response."; Sep 3: S.K. carries out a simulated attack on N.K.’s nuclear test site in a huge show of force in response to Pyongyang’s detonation of what it claims is a hydrogen bomb.; Seoul has also approved the complete deployment of a US anti-missile system in another sign that it intends to address North Korean provocations with reminders of its own military firepower, while keeping the door open to dialogue.; The army and air force drills, held at an undisclosed location on Monday morning, involved launching ballistic missiles in a simulated strike against N.K.’s Punggye-ri nuclear test site – the scene of Sunday’s controlled detonation of what Pyongyang claimed was a powerful hydrogen bomb capable of being loaded on to an intercontinental ballistic missile.; Sep 4: U.S. ambassador to the U.N. told the Security Council that Kim Jong-un “is begging for war”, and adding “the time has come for us to exhaust all of our diplomatic means before it’s too late.”; Sep 6: The U.S. circulates a draft resolution at the U.N., seeking a full authorization for interdiction of N.K. ships in international waters. Such authorization could result in forceful interdiction and lead to escalations, a risk reminiscent to the Cuban Missile Crisis. The draft resolution also seeks to impose a full oil embargo.; Sep 11: The UN Security Council unanimously ratchets up sanctions again against N.K.; These sanctions fall significantly short of the far-reaching penalties that the Trump administration had demanded, having had to compromise with China and Russia to gain their support: The resolution only sets a cap on oil exports to N.K. The U.S. had originally wanted a complete cutoff, but China has long worried that such a drastic measure would lead to N.K.’s collapse.; It asks all countries to inspect ships going in and out of North Korea’s ports (a provision put in place by the Security Council in 2009) but does not authorize the use of force for ships that do not comply (the U.S. wanted authorization to use force).; It imposes requirements, but does not ban, the import of North Korean laborers.; Sep 15: S.K plans donate $8 million to two United Nations humanitarian programs in N.K., but Japan's government asks S.K. to reconsider the aid in light of N.K. latest missile test.; Sep 15: U.S. ambassador to the U.N. hinted to N.K. that military options might be on the table if U.N. sanctions do not deter the regime from advancing its nuclear program.; Sep 19: In his speech to the U.N. General Assembly, Trump vows to “totally destroy” N.K. if it threatens the U.S. or its allies.; Sep 20: Trump signs executive order 13810 to expand U.S. sanctions on N.K.; It enhances Treasury Department authorities to target individuals who provide goods, services or technology to N.K.; Sep 23: American warplanes fly close to the N.K.'s coast, going farther north of the Demilitarized Zone than any other American air mission for the last two decades.; The Air Force advertised the exercise, as a direct response to N.K.’s accelerated missile launches and a nuclear test two weeks earlier.; Sep 24: The U.S. government establishes a travel ban into the U.S., on the citizens of several countries, including of N.K.; The Trump administration argues the ban's purpose is to enhance security, and in the case of N.K. the ban is specifically imposed because "North Korea does not cooperate with the United States Government in any respect and fails to satisfy all information-sharing requirements".; Sep 30: U.S. Trump administration acknowledges for the first time that it is in direct communication with N.K, over its missile and nuclear tests.; Oct 1: However, one day later Trump calls the U.S. Secretary of State's diplomatic efforts a waste of time. |

=== October ===
| North Korea | South Korea and International |
|---|---|
| | Oct 1: Italy becomes fifth country to expel N.K. ambassador, in response to N.K.'s continued pursuit of its nuclear weapons program.; The other four countries that recently expelled the N.K. ambassador were Spain, Mexico, Peru and Kuwait.; Oct 1: It is revealed that the August 11, 2016 seizure of 30,000 grenades from N.K., by Egyptian customs authorities, were actually bought by Egypt itself, against the UN sanctions imposed on North Korean arms trade.; After the seizure, the Jie Shun was taken to Al Adabiyah port, berthed there on Aug 27, 2016. Since then and as of Oct 2 2017, the ship stopped transmitting its Automatic identification system. |

=== November ===
| North Korea | South Korea and International |
|---|---|
| Nov 29: N.K. test-launches another intercontinental ballistic missile, which flies for about 1,000 km (620 miles) and falls into the Sea of Japan.; It is the 3rd ICBM test, and the 6th missile test, carried by N.K. this year. | Nov 20: U.S. President Donald Trump announces re-listing North Korea as a State Sponsor of Terrorism.; S.K.'s foreign ministry said it sees the decision "as part of the international community's joint efforts to take N.K. to the path of denuclearization."; The U.S. put N.K. on the terror sponsor list in 1988, after North Korean agents blew up a S.K. civilian airliner, killing 115 people. But Pyongyang was removed in 2008 after they met benchmarks related to a nuclear disarmament deal.; Returning North Korea to the terror list would mean it is subject to greater restrictions on U.S. foreign assistance, defense exports and sales, and other financial transactions. |

== Deaths ==
- 13 February – Kim Jong-nam, eldest son of 2nd North Korean leader Kim Jong Il (b. 1971).

== Other ==
- North Korea's 2017 calendar has 71 public holidays, which is two more than in 2016.
- N.K. participates in the Asian Winter Games, hosted in Japan.

== See also ==
- 2017 DPR Korea League
- 2017 North Korean missile tests
- List of years in North Korea
- North Korea at the 2017 World Aquatics Championships
- North Korea at the 2017 World Championships in Athletics
