= Lee Cha-su =

South Korean politician (1957–2020)

- 이차수
- Born: 6 June 1957
- Died: 9 March 2020 (aged 62); Buk District, Daegu
- Citizenship: South Korean
- Occupations: Politician; Civil society activist

Lee Cha-su (Korean: 이차수; Hanja: 李且壽; 6 June 1957 – 9 March 2020), also spelt Lee Cha-soo, was a South Korean politician and social activist.

== Biography ==
He urged the relocation of the K-2 Air Force Base used with Daegu International Airport.

He served as the chairman of the Buk District Council. Lee died in Chilgok, Buk District, Daegu at the age of 62 as a result of coronavirus disease 2019 (COVID-19) on 9 March 2020.
