= 2023 in North Korea =

- Centuries: 20th; 21st
- Decades: 2000s; 2010s; 2020s
- See also: Other events of 2023; Years in North Korea; Timeline of Korean history 2023 in South Korea

The following is a list of events from the year 2023 in North Korea.

== Incumbents ==
Photo	Position	Name
	General Secretary of the Workers' Party of Korea	Kim Jong Un
	Chairman of the Standing Committee of the Supreme People's Assembly	Choe Ryong-hae
	Premier of North Korea	Kim Tok-hun

== Events ==
=== January ===
- 25 January – NK News reports that the North Korean government has imposed a five-day lockdown in Pyongyang due to the spread of an unspecified respiratory infection.

=== March ===
- 20 March – North Korea conducts drills simulating a nuclear counterattack in response to joint amphibious landing exercises by the United States and South Korea.

=== May ===
- 31 May – The launch of North Korean spy satellite Malligyong-1 ends in failure due to its second stage malfunctioning, causing it to crash into the sea.

=== July ===
- 10 July – North Korea threatens to shoot down any U.S. reconnaissance aircraft breaching its airspace following U.S. plans to deploy a ballistic missile submarine near Korea.
- 12 July – North Korea fires intercontinental ballistic missile Hwasong-18 into waters near Japan after threatening the US.

=== August ===
- 16 August – The Korean Central News Agency confirms United States Army soldier Travis King has been detained for illegal entry, claiming it was due to alleged racism within the U.S. Army and is seeking refugee status in the country.
- 27 August – The North Korean government announces the lifting of certain pandemic-era travel restrictions, allowing citizens abroad to return to the country under medical observation for one week.
- 31 August – The Korean Central News Agency reports that North Korea has conducted drills simulating a missile strike on South Korea, in protest at military drills conducted by South Korea with the United States.

=== September ===
- 12 September – 2023 North Korea-Russia summit: North Korean leader Kim Jong Un arrives in Russia for a summit with Russian President Vladimir Putin.
- 13 September: The North Korea–Russia summit is held at the Vostochny Cosmodrome in Amur Oblast, Russia, lasting for four hours, with North Korean leader Kim Jong Un vowing that North Korea will support Russian President Vladimir Putin.
- 17 September: The 2023 North Korea–Russia summit concludes with Kim Jong Un returning to North Korea.
- 27 September: North Korea deports US soldier Travis King, who crossed into North Korea in July, back into U.S. custody.

=== November ===
- 1 November – South Korea's National Intelligence Service reports that North Korea has supplied Russia with over one million rounds of artillery shells for its ongoing invasion of Ukraine.
- 26 November – 2023 North Korean local elections

== Deaths ==
- 9 February: O Kuk-ryol, 93, military officer, chief of the general staff (1980–1988) and vice chairman of the National Defence Commission (2009–2016).
- 14 September: Kim Il-chol, 90, military officer, minister of defence (1997–2009) and member of the National Defence Commission (1988–2010).
- 1 October: Kim Yong-il, 76, diplomat and politician.
