= Won Hong-gu =

North Korean ornithologist (1888–1970)

Member of the Supreme People's Assembly

Personal details
- Born: 8 April 1888 Busan, Joseon
- Died: 3 October 1970 (aged 82)
- Resting place: Patriotic Martyrs' Cemetery
- Citizenship: North Korean
- Party: Workers' Party of Korea
- Education: Suwon Agricultural high school
- Alma mater: Kagoshima Agriculture University

Military service
- Allegiance: North Korea

Korean name
- Hangul: 원홍구
- Hanja: 元洪九
- RR: Won Honggu
- MR: Wŏn Honggu

Won Hong-gu or Won Hong Koo (Korean: 원홍구; 8 April 1888 - 3 October 1970) was an ornithologist, professor and a member of the Supreme People's Assembly (parliament) in the Democratic People's Republic of Korea (North Korea). He was the first to establish the names of local birds in the Korean language and to publish a major ornithological monograph for the region. He was also a specialist on small mammals. He was separated from his children during the liberation of Korea from Japanese rule and its separation. Unknown to him, due to the political barriers between South and North Korea, his son Won Pyong-oh also became an eminent ornithologist in South Korea. The two learned of each other's existence after the war through a migrating starling that had been ringed by the son and recovered by the father.

== Biography ==
Hong-gu was born in Pusan, North Saksu, and graduated from Suwon Agricultural high school in 1910. He went to Japan where he studied at the Kagoshima Agriculture University for eleven years. In 1920 he became a teacher of natural science and biology at Songdo Gobo in Gaeseong. He studied birds extensively from 1929 to 1941 across Korea and published numerous papers. In 1940 he was a principal of Dukcheon Public Agricultural School in Pyeongnamand and later at the Kangseo Agricultural School. When the liberation from Japanese occupation began he and his wife decided to flee. A daughter lived in the American controlled southern zone while three sons lived in the Soviet-controlled northern zone including the youngest Won Pyong-oh who was studying. A second son Hin who was studying small mammals in Mongolia was shot dead in August 1945 by the Chinese Army who mistook him for a Japanese operative. In 1946 Won and his wife moved to Pyongyang where he became head of the biology department at the newly founded Kim Il Sung University. He was not treated favourably due to the fact that his sons had "fled" to South Korea. A former student of his, Jong Jun-thaek, however became Vice Premier of the North Korean state and helped in protecting the reputation of his teacher and advancing his career. In 1962, the North Korean Academy of Sciences was founded and Won Hong-Gu was appointed Director of the Zoological Institute of the Academy. He then transferred the specimens in his personal collection to the institute although many had been damaged. With the end of the Korean War in July 1953, Won became a permanent member of the Supreme People's Assembly, North Korea's unicameral parliament, which was a powerful position. He accompanied President Kim Il Sung on hunting trips and identified birds for him. The President gifted him a hunting rifle and also sent him bird specimens from East Germany. Other privileges included a specially imported Polish FSC Żuk car for his institute. In the 1960s he published a three volume work on the birds of Korea and a monograph on the mammals. Won was the first to establish bird names in Korean. He was also a pioneer of bird conservation measures in which he trained former bird hunters.

=== Contact with his son ===
The youngest son, Won Pyong-oh, grew up separated from his parents in South Korea and unknown to his father, became an ornithologist of repute. In 1965 Professor Won found a ringed Daurian myna at a park in Pyongyang. The Professor had been allowed to communicate with Japan on ornithological matters and he contacted the International Council for Bird Preservation's Tokyo office for information and learned that the bird had been ringed by his son in Seoul in the spring of 1963 with the Japanese ring "C 7655". The recovery was also communicated by the ICBP to Won Pyong-Oh and this was the first time that the father and son learned of each other after the war. In July 1966, the son Won Pyong-Oh attended the 14th International Ornithologists Congress at Oxford where he happened to meet the Polish ornithologist Jan Pinowski who told him that he was researching sparrows in North Korea in association with his father. The two had long discussions and Won Pyong-Oh wrote a long letter with photographs to his father and although it was forbidden, the letter was smuggled into North Korea by another attendee at the Congress, Professor L.A. Portenko, who passed it on through another Soviet scientist visiting North Korea on work. Professor Won Hong-gu had believed North Korean propaganda that the South lived in abject poverty and misery. When he read the letter, he is said to have declared that: "[Now I know everything, now I can die]." The story went around rapidly and moved many including the Japanese author Kimio Endo who wrote a novel based on the two professors in 1984. In 1990, talks of reconciliation between the two Koreas began and the opportunity was utilized by North Korean ideologues who made a colour feature film in 1992 on the two Wons called "[The Birds]". A 1992 postal stamp from DPR Korea also commemorated the event.

When Won died in October 1970, he was buried with military honours at the Patriotic Martyrs' Cemetery in Pyongyang. His hunting rifle gifted by the President was put on display at the Zoological Institute. Won Pyong-oh heard of his father's death only in 1978 when he attended a meeting of the International Union for Nature Conservation at Askhabad.
