= 2018 in North Korea =

- Centuries: 20th; 21st
- Decades: 1990s; 2000s; 2010s; 2020s
- See also: Other events of 2018; Years in North Korea; Timeline of Korean history 2018 in South Korea

2018 in North Korea was marked by attempts by the government to develop its international relationships, particularly in regards to South Korea. In February, North Korean athletes marched alongside their South Korean counterparts under the Korean Unification Flag at the 2018 Seoul Olympic Games. North Korea's Kim Jong Un met with South Korea's Moon Jae-in three times during the year. Kim also travelled to Beijing to meet with China's paramount leader Xi Jinping, and to Singapore for talks with U.S. President Donald Trump.

== Incumbents ==
- Party Chairman and State Chairman: Kim Jong Un
- President of the Supreme People's Assembly: Kim Yong-nam
- Premier: Pak Pong-ju

== Events ==
=== January ===
- 1 January: Kim Jong Un announces in his New Year's speech that North Korea may participate in the 2018 Winter Olympics. The announcement came after a period of uncertainty caused by the North Korean national Olympic committee's failure to enter the only North Korean athletes that had qualified.
- 3 January: The Seoul–Pyongyang hotline is restored to use after almost two years in preparation for high-level talks concerning North Korea's participation in the Winter Olympics.
- 9 January: North and South Korea agree in the high-level talks for more than two years that North Korean athletes will enter the Winter Olympics.
- 20 January: The International Olympic Committee (IOC) confirms that North Korea will participate in the Winter Olympics with a team of 22 athletes, 12 of whom are ice hockey players who will play together with South Korean players under the IOC designation Korea (COR) in the women's tournament.

=== February ===
North and South Korea marched together under the Korean Unification Flag at the 2018 Winter Olympics opening ceremony.

- 8 February: A military parade of 13,000 soldiers is held in Pyongyang. The February 8 date is unusual for parades which are usually held on the Day of the Sun (15 April) or the Military Foundation Day (25 April).(
- 9 February: North and South Korean athletes march together under the Korean Unification Flag at the 2018 Winter Olympics opening ceremony in the attendance of Kim Yong-nam and Kim Yo-jong.

- North Korean media confirms that Hwang Pyong-so had been fired from his post, the Director of the General Political Bureau of the Korean People's Army. According to South Korean sources, the sacking was due to corruption.

=== March ===
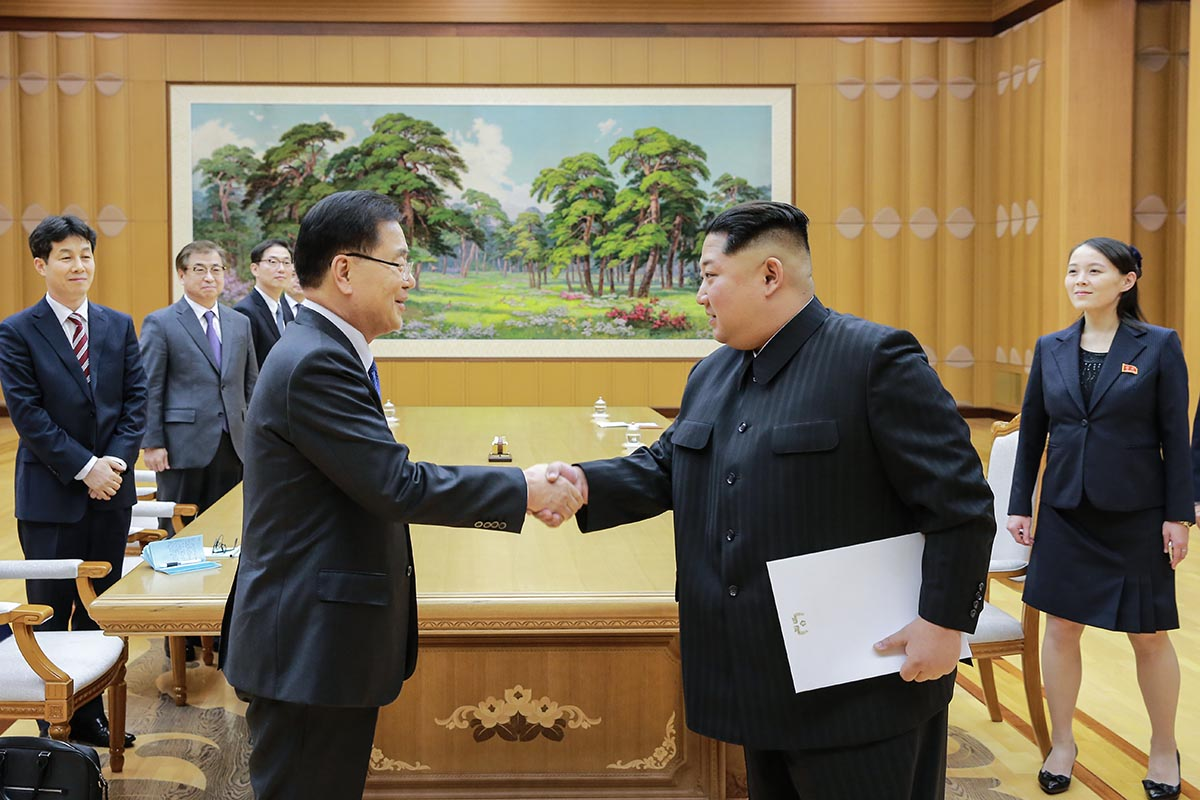
Chung Eui-yong of the South Korean delegation shakes hands with Kim Jong Un in Pyongyang.

- March 5: A South Korean delegation visits Pyongyang to hold talks with Kim Jong Un, agreeing to organize a 2018 North Korea–United States summit with Kim and U.S. President Donald Trump.
- March 28: Kim Jong Un met with China's paramount leader Xi Jinping for the first time in Beijing.

=== April ===
- April 27: Kim Jong Un meets with South Korean President Moon Jae-in at the Inter-Korean Peace House, in the village of Panmunjom.

=== May ===
- May 2: North Korea released three detained US prisoners.
- May 12: North Korea confirms they will open territorial air space and invite foreign media to cover the dismantling of their nuclear test site.
- May 15: North Korea threatens to cancel 2018 North Korea–United States summit with United States President Donald Trump amid American military exercises with South Korea.
- May 24: Foreign journalists report that tunnels in the Punggye-ri nuclear test site have been destroyed by the North Korean government in a move to reduce regional tensions.

=== June ===
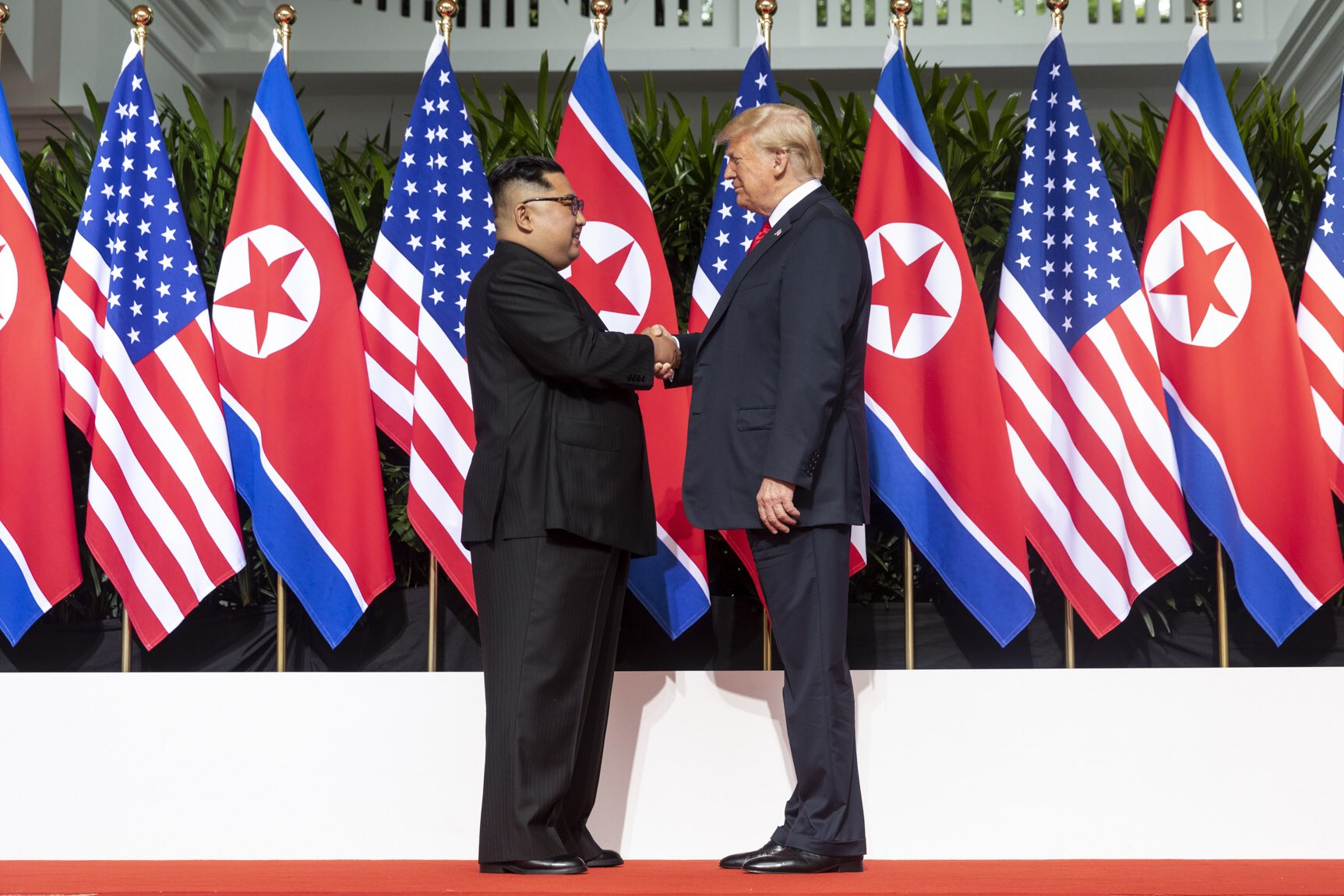
Kim Jong Un (left) and Donald Trump (right) shaking hands

- June 12: Kim Jong Un meets with US President Donald Trump in Sentosa Island, Singapore.

=== September ===
- September 9: A military parade in central in honor of the 70th anniversary of the founding of the DPRK. The parade, which was held on Day of the Foundation of the Republic, was attended by Russian Federation Council Chairman Valentina Matviyenko and Mauritanian President Mohamed Ould Abdel Aziz, as well as delegations from Cuba, Syria, Lebanon, Palestine, the Dominican Republic, Uganda, and South Africa.
- September 18–20: September 2018 inter-Korean summit

=== November ===
- November 4–6: President of the Council of State of Cuba Miguel Díaz-Canel visits North Korean Leader Kim Jong Un in Pyongyang.

=== December ===
- December 3: Metropolitan Hilarion Alfeyev of the Russian Orthodox Church visited North Korea, meeting with officials and leading a service at the Church of the Life-Giving Trinity in Pyongyang.

=== Scheduled events ===
- North Korea at the 2018 Summer Youth Olympics

== Deaths ==
- 14 January – Kim Kwang-suk, singer of the Pochonbo Electronic Ensemble (b. 1964).
- 16 August – Kim Yong Chun, 8th Minister of the People's Armed Forces (b. 1936).
- 3 September – Ju Kyu-chang, director of the Machine-Building Industry Department of the Workers' Party of Korea (b. 1928).
- 3 December – Kim Chol-man, politician and military official (b. 1920).

== See also ==
- List of years in North Korea
- 2017–18 North Korea crisis
- Vancouver Foreign Ministers’ Meeting on Security and Stability on Korean Peninsula
- Kim–Xi meetings
