= 2022 in North Korea =

- Centuries: 20th; 21st
- Decades: 2000s; 2010s; 2020s
- See also: Other events of 2022; Years in North Korea; Timeline of Korean history 2022 in South Korea

The following is a list of events from the year 2022 in North Korea.

== Incumbents ==
Photo	Position	Name
	General Secretary of the Workers' Party of Korea	Kim Jong-un
	Chairman of the Standing Committee of the Supreme People's Assembly	Choe Ryong-hae
	Premier of North Korea	Kim Tok-hun

== Events ==
=== February ===
26 February – North Korea's Foreign Ministry blames the U.S. for the Ukraine conflict, citing its pursuit of military supremacy while ignoring Russia's security. Researcher Ri Ji-song authors the statement, Pyongyang's first public response.

=== March ===
- 25 March – North Korea tested its longest-range ICBM.

=== May ===
- 12 May
  - COVID-19 pandemic – Pyongyang declares a "severe national emergency" after its first confirmed case of COVID-19, imposing a nationwide lockdown and closing borders. Limited trade with China continues.
  - Sunan district of Pyongyang fired three short-range missiles east of the Korean peninsula, two days after Yoon Suk-yeol took office as President of South Korea.
- 13 May – State media confirmed six deaths and 350,000 new cases of COVID-19.

== Deaths ==
- 27 January – Ri Yong-mu, North Korean senior official who was a member of the Politburo of the Workers' Party of Korea, vice-chairman of the National Defence Commission of North Korea and vice-marshal of the Korean People's Army (b. 1925)
- 13 May – Yang Hyong-sop, 4th Chairman of the Standing Committee of the Supreme People's Assembly (b. 1925).
- 19 May – Hyon Chol Hae, military officer and former member of the Politburo of the Workers' Party of Korea (b. 1934)
- 27 July – Pak To Chun, former Member of the Politburo of the Workers' Party of Korea (b. 1944).
- 19 September – Pak Yong-il, Vice-Chairman of the standing committee of the SPA (b. 1966)
