= 2023 in South Korea =

- Centuries: 20th; 21st
- Decades: 2000s; 2010s; 2020s; 2030s
- See also: Other events of 2023; Years in South Korea; Timeline of Korean history 2023 in North Korea

The following lists events in the year 2023 in South Korea.

== Incumbents ==
Office	Image	Name	Tenure / Current length
President of the Republic of Korea		Yoon Suk Yeol	10 May 2022 (3 years ago)
Speaker of the National Assembly		Kim Jin-pyo	4 July 2022 (3 years ago)
Chief Justice of the Supreme Court		Kim Myeong-soo	25 September 2017 (8 years ago)
President of the Constitutional Court		Yoo Nam-seok	21 September 2018 (7 years ago)
Prime Minister of the Republic of Korea		Han Duck-soo	21 May 2022 (3 years ago)

== Events ==
- 12 January - South Korean president Yoon Suk Yeol stated that if the security situation regarding the threat from North Korean nuclear weapons deteriorates further, South Korea would consider building their own nuclear weapons to deterrent the North or request that the United States deploy nuclear weapons in South Korea.
- 19 January - Iran and South Korea summon each other ambassadors in a deepening spat between both countries, after South Korean President Yoon Suk-yeol called Iran "the enemy of the United Arab Emirates" while addressing South Korean troops stationed there.
- 30 January - South Korea lifted COVID-19 mask mandates up for most indoor spaces.
- 3 February - A court in South Korea sentences former Minister of Justice Cho Kuk to two years in prison after convicting him on charges of abuse of power and helping his children enter prestigious schools under fake credentials.
- 4 February - Nine sailors are missing after their fishing vessel capsizes off the coast of Sinan County, South Jeolla Province, South Korea. President Yoon Suk-yeol has deployed the coast guard to conduct an air-sea rescue for the missing people.
- 20 February - Leader of the People Power Party Chung Jin Suk said that South Korea might need nuclear weapons.
- 6 March - South Korea agrees to pay compensation to its citizens who were forced to work in Japanese factories during World War II.
- 12 March - Mayor of Seoul Oh Se-hoon called for South Korea to have Nuclear weapons.
- 11 April - Hundreds of residents of Gangneung, are forced to evacuate as more than 2,300 firefighters combat a spreading wildfire.
- 16 June - More than 80 people are injured in a multi-vehicle accident involving three school buses in Hongcheon County, Gangwon Province.
- 25 June to 26 July – According to South Korea's National Fire Agency official confirmed report, a heavy massibie torrential rain, following flash flooding, landslide hit around Chungcheongbuk-do, Chungcheongnam-do, include 15 vehicles trapped by flood swept in Second Gunpyeng underpass, and total kill 52 persons, injure 35 persons.
- 28 June – South Korea drops the traditional age counting method in favor of the international standard.
- 1 to 12 August: 25th World Scout Jamboree
- 8 August – The South Korean government evacuates over 36,000 participants of the 25th World Scout Jamboree from their campsite at Saemangeum, North Jeolla, ahead of Typhoon Khanun's expected landfall.
- 12 August – South Koreans gather in central Seoul to protest against Japan's plan to release treated radioactive water from the Fukushima nuclear power plant into the ocean.
- 13 November – In baseball, the LG Twins defeat the KT Wiz to win the Korean Series in five games, capturing their third championship and their first since 1994.
- 23 November – The High Court of Seoul orders Japan to pay compensation of ₩200 million (around ¥22 million or US$154,000) to 16 comfort women during World War II, overturning a previous ruling that denied the women's claims due to sovereign immunity.
- 25 December – Two people are killed and 29 others are injured in a fire at a residential building in Seoul.

== Holidays ==
As per in the [Presidential Decree No. 28394, 2017. 10. 17., partially amended], the following days are declared holidays in South Korea:

- 1 January - New Year's Day
- 21 January to 24 January - Korean New Year
- 1 March - March 1st Movement Day
- 5 May - Children's Day South Korea
- 27 May - Buddha's Birthday
- 6 June - Memorial Day
- 15 August - National Liberation Day
- 28 September to 30 September - Chuseok
- 3 October - National Foundation Day
- 9 October - Hangul Day
- 25 December - Christmas Day

== Arts and entertainment ==
- 2023 in South Korean music
- 2023 in South Korean television
- List of South Korean films of 2023
- List of 2023 box office number-one films in South Korea
- 28th Busan International Film Festival
- 32nd Buil Film Awards
- 2023 Asia Contents Awards & Global OTT Awards
- 44th Blue Dragon Film Awards

== Deaths ==
- 5 January – Kim Deok-ju, 89, lawyer and judge, chief justice (1990–1993)
- 19 January – Yoon Jeong-hee, 78, actress
- 19 April – Moonbin, 25, singer, Member of Kpop Boy Band Astro
- 18 September – Byun Hee-bong, 81, actor
- 3 December – Kim Soo-yong, 94, director
- 27 December – Lee Sun-kyun, 48, actor
- 31 December – Jaerock Lee, 80, Christian pastor and convicted sex offender, founder of the Manmin Central Church.
