= 2021 in North Korea =

- Centuries: 20th; 21st
- Decades: 2000s; 2010s; 2020s
- See also: Other events of 2021; Years in North Korea; Timeline of Korean history 2021 in South Korea

Events in the year 2021 in North Korea.

== Incumbents ==
- Party Chairman → Party General Secretary: Kim Jong Un
- Chairman of the State Affairs Commission: Kim Jong Un
- President of the Supreme People's Assembly: Choe Ryong-hae
- Premier: Kim Tok-hun

== Events ==
- January 4, 2021 – North Korea submitted an application to secure coronavirus vaccines through a global program that assisted low-income countries.
- From 5 January – The 8th Congress of the Workers' Party of Korea.
- January 8, 2021 – North Korean leader Kim Jong-un vowed to work on inter-Korean relations to expand diplomatic engagement and hosted a rare party congress.
- 10 January – 8th Congress congress restored the operative functions of the General Secretary of the Workers' Party of Korea, a title previously awarded "eternally" to Kim Jong Il, and elected Kim Jong Un to it.
- On January 14, a military parade took place in Kim Il-sung Square in which ballistic missiles were revealed, after a Workers' Party of Korea meeting was held by Kim Jong Un to oppose growing "US hostility." The Korean Central News Agency announced that the nuclear weapons showcased could “pre-emptively and completely destroy any enemy outside of our territory”.
- March 25, 2021 – North Korea launched two ballistic missiles into the Sea of Japan, the first missile test to happen during the United States' Biden administration.
- June 15, 2021 – At a Central Committee Plenary Session, Kim Jong-un publicly acknowledged a “tense food situation” caused by floods and the pandemic, and ordered stronger efforts in agriculture and rural management.
- September 11, 2021 – North Korea tested a new long-range cruise missile. State media claimed it traveled 1,500 kilometers and described it as a "strategic weapon" with potential nuclear capability.
- October 4, 2021 – North Korea announced it would reactivate all communication lines with South Korea after urging Seoul to make “positive” efforts to restore ties. The decision came days after Kim Jong-un expressed an intention during a policy speech to reopen the hotlines in early October.
- November 5, 2021 – A United Nations report found that more than four in ten North Koreans were suffering from undernourishment, as the country continued to face chronic food shortages.
- November 6, 2021 – North Korea launched a major crackdown to root out foreign culture, primarily from South Korea, as well as “capitalist tendencies,” including corruption.
- December 13, 2021 – South Korea, North Korea, China, and the United States agreed “in principle” to declare a formal end to the Korean War, nearly 70 years after the conflict ended in an armistice, according to South Korean President Moon Jae-in. (Note: Although on December 13, 2021, South Korea, North Korea, the U.S., and China reportedly agreed “in principle” to a formal end-of-war declaration, progress stalled. By year’s end, Seoul and Washington had drafted a joint declaration, but Pyongyang declined substantive participation. The agreement remained largely symbolic, lacking concrete commitments or sequencing mechanisms, and subsequent years saw continued military escalation and diplomatic impasse.)
- December 27, 2021 – Kim Jong-un declared 2022 the “Year of Rural Development,” focusing on farming and regional industry, and reiterated the need for self-reliance amid sanctions and prolonged border closures.

== Deaths ==
- 4 February – Ri Jae-il, politician, First Deputy Director of the Propaganda and Agitation Department (born 1935).
- 13 December – Kim Yong-ju, politician and the younger brother of Kim Il Sung (born 1920).
