= Daegu office fire =

Suspected arson attack in South Korea

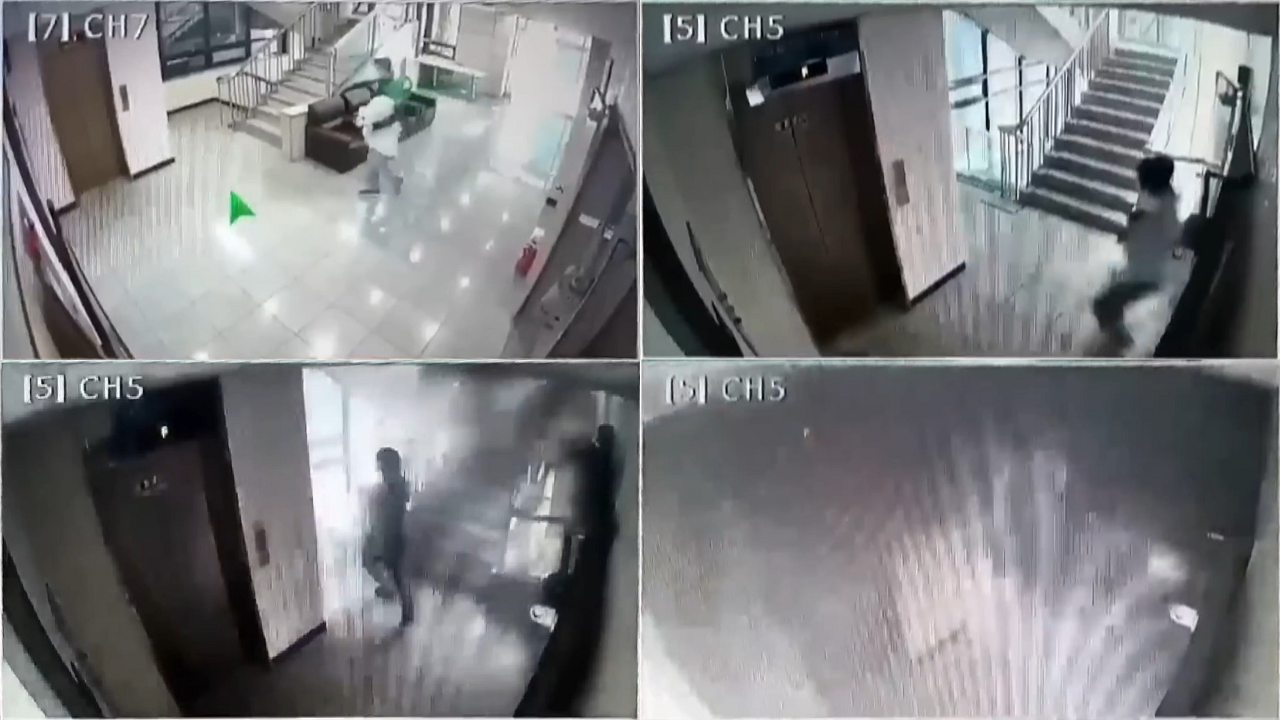
- CCTV footage
- Date: June 9, 2022
- Location: Daegu, South Korea
- Type: Arson (suspected)
- Deaths: 7 (including the suspect)
- Injuries: 49

On 9 June 2022, a fire caused by a suspected arson attack broke out at an office building in Daegu, South Korea, killing seven people and injuring 49 others. Among the dead was the suspected arsonist, who was reported to have started the fire in a lawyer's office.

The suspect had previously filed a complaint at a lawyer's office before the fire, and was recorded by CCTV footage carrying what looked like flammable materials. The fire broke out after he entered the office on the second floor. The flames were eventually put out in around 20 minutes by a team of 120 firefighters.

== See also ==
- Daegu subway fire, another act of arson in Daegu
