= Hyun Kil-un =

Korean writer

- Born: February 17, 1940; Jeju City, Jeju Province, Korea, Empire of Japan
- Died: March 10, 2020 (aged 80)
- Education: Jeju University, Hanyang University
- Writing career
- Language: Korean
- Genre: Jeju political fiction

- Hyun Kil-un
- Hangul: 현길언
- Hanja: 玄吉彦
- RR: Hyeon Gileon
- MR: Hyŏn Kirŏn

Hyun Kil-Un (Korean: 현길언; February 17, 1940 – March 10, 2020) was a Jeju Island-based South Korean writer.

== Biography ==
Hyun Kil-Un was born on February 17, 1940, in Jeju City, Jeju Province, Korea, Empire of Japan. Hyun graduated from Jeju University and then Hanyang University's Graduate School. Hyun was a professor of Korean Language and Literature at Hanyang University.

== Work ==
Hyun's work can not be separated from his birthplace, Jeju-do, the largest island of Korea. Hyun's Jeju-do was not a vacation destination, but the land of the first mass rebellion after the Korean national division. Hyun visited and re-visited the events of the time, and the scars that they caused.

The stories contained in his first collection, The Dream of Pegasus (Yongma Ui Kkum, 1984), deal specifically with the traumatic historical event remembered as “April 3rd Uprising”, in which masses of ordinary civilians were slaughtered by the police in an attempt to rout communists. Hyun tries to reinvestigate this event and properly mourn the death of innocent people in order to console their hovering spirits. Often it is the unique customs and folklore of Jeju Island that suggests a way toward healing: “The Journal of Gwangjeong Pavilion” (Gwangjeong dang gi, ) and “Ceremony on the Last Day of the Month” utilize the traditional legend of a “strong woman” to describe the hope people of Jeju harbor for the return of a hero who will save them from the tyranny of politicians and bureaucrats. Hyun was also concerned with ideological or historical distortions of truth. Private truth is to be privileged over official accounts; The Skin and the Inner Flesh (Kkeop-jil Gwa Soksal, 1993) employs the sustained metaphor of surface and depth to characterize the relationship between official, often ideologically manipulated versions of “truth” and enduring human truths buried beneath. It is precisely these surface distortions or historical fallacies that he sought to expose in “Fever” (Sinyeol) and “A Strange Tie” (Isanghan kkeun).

== Works in translation ==
- Dead Silence and Other Stories of the Jeju massacre (ISBN 1891936808)(현길언 단편선)
- La Ville grise (회색도시)

== Works in Korean (partial) ==
Story collections

- The Dream of Pegasus, Biographies of Our Age (Uri Sidae Ui Yeoljeon, 1984)
- Rainbow Must Have Seven Colors to be Beautiful (Mujigae Neun Ilgopsaek I-eoseo Areum Dapta, 1989)
- At Betrayal's End (Baeban Ui Kkeut, 1993)

Novels

- Woman's River (Yeoja Ui Gang, 1992)
- A Gray City (Hoesaek Dosi, 1993)
- Halla Mountain (Hallasan, 1994)

Critical studies

- Analytical Understanding of Korean Novels and Theory and Practice: Fictional Works of Hyeon Jingeon

== Awards ==
- 1985 Nogwon Literary Prize
- 1990 Contemporary Literature Prize
- 1992 Republic of Korea Literary Honor
