= 2019 in North Korea =

- Centuries: 20th; 21st
- Decades: 1990s; 2000s; 2010s; 2020s
- See also: Other events of 2019; Years in North Korea; Timeline of Korean history 2019 in South Korea

Events of 2019 in North Korea.

== Incumbents ==
- Party Chairman and State Chairman: Kim Jong-un
- President of the Supreme People's Assembly: Kim Yong-nam (until 11 April); Choe Ryong-hae (starting 11 April)
- Premier: Pak Pong-ju (until 11 April); Kim Jae-ryong (starting 11 April)

== Events ==
- 1 January: Pyongyang sees in the new year with fireworks, a drone show, and a concert that features Mansudae Art Troupe, the Phibada Opera Troupe, the National Folk Art Troupe, Kim Won Gyun University of Music, and the Moranbong Band.
- 10 March: Parliamentary election.
- 11 April: During the first session of the 14th Supreme People's Assembly, Kim Jae-ryong is appointed premier, replacing Pak Pong-ju after 6 years, and Choe Ryong-hae is appointed president of the presidium, replacing Kim Yong-nam after 21 years.
- 25 April: 2019 North Korea–Russia summit - Kim Jong Un meets Vladimir Putin in Vladivostok to discuss North Korea’s nuclear program and seek Russian support for talks with the U.S.; Putin later accepts Kim’s invitation to visit North Korea.
- 9 May: North Korea undergoes a Universal Periodic Review at the UN Human Rights Council, accepting 132 out of 262 recommendations on human rights issues.
- 30 June: An impromptu summit is held between Kim Jong Un, South Korean President Moon Jae-in, and US President Donald Trump.
- 21 July: 2019 North Korean local elections
- 7 November: South Korea deports two North Korean fishermen to face murder charges in North Korea.
