= Moon Deoksu =

South Korean writer (1928–2020)

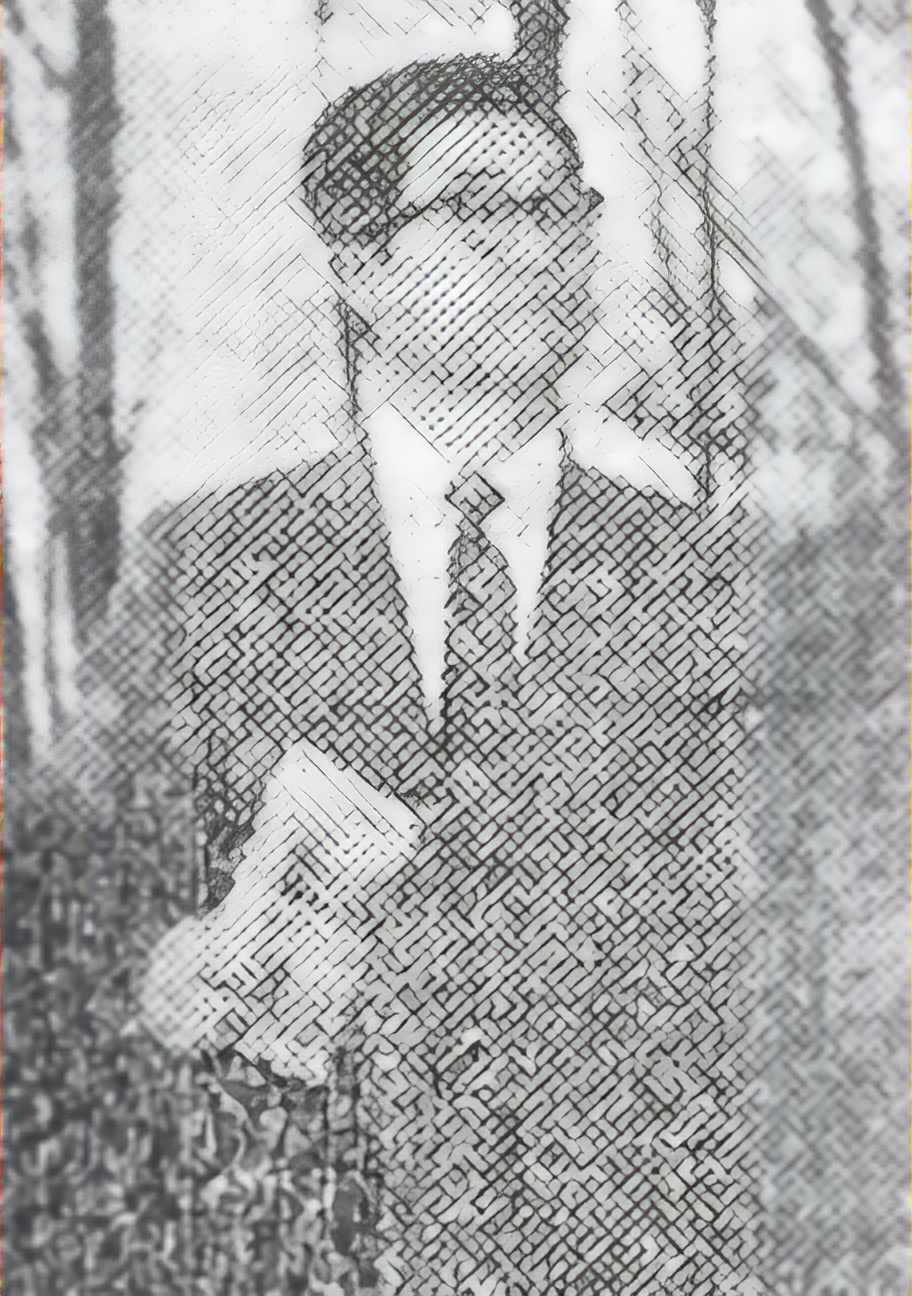
- Born: December 8, 1928; Haman County, Keishōnan Province, Korea, Empire of Japan
- Died: March 13, 2020 (aged 91)
- Writing career
- Pen name: Simsan and Cheongtae
- Language: Korean
- Period: 1955-2020

Korean name
- Hangul: 문덕수
- Hanja: 文德守
- RR: Mun Deoksu
- MR: Mun Tŏksu

Moon Deoksu (Korean: 문덕수; December 8, 1928 – March 13, 2020) was a South Korean poet.

== Biography ==
Moon Deoksu was born December 8, 1928, in Haman County Keishōnan Province, Korea, Empire of Japan. Moon graduated from Hongik University, attended Tsukuba University, and graduate school at Korea University, resulting in a Ph.D. in Literature. He worked for the Magazine, Shidan and served in many organizations including as President of the Poetry Second of the Korean Literature Association; President of the Modern Poet's Association; Vice Director of the Korean Literature Association; Director, Vice President, and President of the Korean branch of P.E.N.; Representative of the Korean Committee for the International Poets' Union, and as President of the Korean Culture and Arts Foundation. Moon also taught at Jeju and Hongik University, and served as a Dean of the College of Education at the latter.

== Work ==
Moon's pen names are Simsan and Cheongtae. Recommended by Yoo Chihwan, he made his literary debut in 1955 with his "Silence" (Chimmuk), "Foil" (Hwaseok) and "In the Wind" (Baram sogeseo) published in Contemporary Literature (Hyeondae munhak).

The Literature Translation Institute of Korea describes his work

Moon's poetry can be divided into three categories according to the time of their composition. In his early collections, Entrancement (Hwanghol) and Line and Dimension (Seon, Gonggan), he depicts the workings and the nature of the human mind and creativity in an unrestrained style of free association, and occasionally automatic writing. The second category consists of the poems in the collections The Sea at Dawn (Saebyeok bada), Everlasting Flower Field (Yeongwonhan kkotbat), and Only We Who Survived Greet June (Saranameun urideulmani dasi Yuworeul maja). Here, he severely criticizes the aspects of contemporary civilization which allowed for the proliferation of immorality, conformism, standardization, simplification, and absurdities that in turn have brought about general dehumanization.

The final, third category includes his last publications, the collections Making Bridges (Dari noki), Reducing Little by Little (Jogeumssik jurimyeonseo), The Mist of Your Words (Geudae malsseumui angae) and Allegro for Encounter (Mannameul wihan allegeuro). He combines conservative themes and concerns with literary experiments to produce an original, effective critique of civilization, nature, and ossified poetic forms. Moon openly rejects black-and-white logic, especially when confronting literature; his work is characterized by restlessness and a thirst for innovation. Moon has been highly praised for crafting sophisticated forms to capture the nature of psychological sentiments and for having employed language as a material with which to build entities rather than empty, merely reflective symbols. He has published, in addition to volumes of poetry, theoretical works such as Understanding Contemporary Literature (Hyeondae munhagui ihae), Theory of Contemporary Korean Poetry (Hyeondae hanguk siron), A Study of Modernism in Korea (Hanguk modeonijeum yeongu), and Reality and Humanist Literature (Hyeonsil gwa hyumeonijeum munhak).

== Works in translation ==
- The Anthology of Modern Korean Poetry (ISBN 0856921629)(한국현대시선)
- Drawing Lines (ISBN 1931907129) (문덕수 시선)

== Works in Korean (partial) ==
Poetry collections

- Entrancement
- Line and Dimension
- The Sea at Dawn
- Everlasting Flower Field
- Only We Who Survived Greet June
- Making Bridges
- Reducing Little by Little
- The Mist of Your Words
- Allegro for Encounter

Criticism and theory

- Understanding Contemporary Literature
- Theory of Contemporary Korean Poetry
- A Study of Modernism in Korea
- Reality and Humanist Literature

== Awards ==
- Hyundai Munhak Literary Prize (1974)
- Culture and Arts Prize of the Republic of Korea (1970)
- Award of Korea Publishers School (1981)
- Presidential Order of Merit for Education (1983)
- P.E.N. Korea Literary Award (1985)
