= Won Pyong-oh =

South Korean zoologist (1929–2020)

- Hangul: 원병오
- Hanja: 元炳旿
- RR: Won Byeongo
- MR: Wŏn Pyŏngo

Won Pyong-oh (May 19, 1929 – April 9, 2020) was a South Korean zoologist, known particularly for his work on Korean birds. He was the son of noted North Korean ornithologist Won Hong-gu (1888–1970). He published approximately 120 papers on Korean ornithology. He also published about 10 book-length studies of Korean zoology, although none have been translated into English.

== Biography ==
Born in Kaesong, Won began his college education in North Korea, graduating from Wonsan Agricultural College (원산농업대학) in 1950 with a degree in animal husbandry and joined there for work. With the outbreak of the Korean War in that year, he escaped to the South with a brother, while his parents and one brother remained in the North. Pyong-oh worked as a veterinary lieutenant on the front and he left military service in 1956 as a captain and joined the South Korean Department of Agriculture. He obtained a second degree in biology from Kyunghee University in 1959 and moved to Hokkaido working on a doctoral thesis that he received from Sapporo University in 1961. He was appointed to a permanent position at the Kyung Hee University and in 1962 he went to Yale to work under Sidney Dillon Ripley. He became a full professor of zoology in May 1969. He headed the South Korean Society for Nature Conservation from 1992.

In 1965, a Daurian starling ringed by Won in Seoul was found and reported by his father. This was the first contact between the two men after they were separated by the war. He managed to smuggle a letter to his father through the assistance of Soviet ornithologist Leonid Portenko. In 2002, Won was finally granted permission to visit the North, although his parents and brother were then dead.

Founded Kyunghee University Natural History Museum in 1978.

As of 2006, Won was professor emeritus at Kyunghee University.

He died on April 9, 2020.
