= Jie Shun =

Jie Shun is a North Korean cargo vessel built in 1986. She flies the flag of Cambodia and lists Phnom Penh as her homeport.

== Condition ==
According to a United Nations investigation, the frame of Jie Shun was badly corroded when she was seized in 2016, and the desalination system was not functioning.

== Registration ==
Jie Shun was registered in Cambodia, which served as a flag of convenience, and routinely disabled her transponder, in order to avoid drawing attention. In 2014, the vessel was reportedly owned by company owned by Chinese nationals Sun Sidong, also the majority shareholder of Dandong Dongyuan Industrial.

== Sanctions violations ==
Jie Shun left Haeju, North Korea on July 23, 2016, with a crew of twenty-three, including a political commissar. In August 2016, Jie Shun was detained by Egyptian authorities in Egyptian waters before transiting the Suez Canal, acting on information provided by the United States intelligence community. Jie Shun was found to be transporting iron ore and 30,000 RPG-7 rocket-propelled grenades, in violation of United Nations sanctions. A UN investigation subsequently found that North Korea had been attempting to traffic prohibited military hardware to the Egyptian Armed Forces. The value of the shipment was estimated at US$23 million.
