= Won Hee-ryong =

South Korean politician (born 1964)

- 원희룡
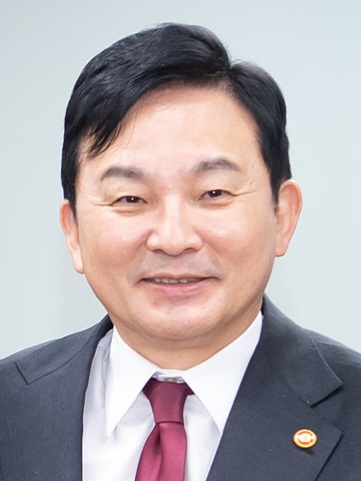
- Won in 2023

Minister of Land, Infrastructure and Transport
- In office 13 May 2022 – 22 December 2023
- President: Yoon Suk Yeol
- Prime Minister: Choo Kyung-ho (acting); Han Duck-soo
- Preceded by: Noh Hyeong-ouk
- Succeeded by: Park Sang-woo

Governor of Jeju Province
- In office 1 July 2014 – 11 August 2021
- Preceded by: Woo Keun-min
- Succeeded by: Koo Man-sub (acting); Oh Young-hun

Member of the National Assembly
- In office 30 May 2000 – 29 May 2012
- Preceded by: Park Bum-jin
- Succeeded by: Kil Jeong-woo
- Constituency: Yangcheon A (Seoul)

Personal details
- Born: 14 February 1964 (age 62) Seogwipo, Jeju, South Korea
- Party: People Power
- Education: Seoul National University (LLB); Hanyang University (MA)

- Won Hee-ryong
- Hangul: 원희룡
- Hanja: 元喜龍
- RR: Won Huiryong
- MR: Wŏn Hŭiryong

Won Hee-ryong (Korean: 원희룡; born February 14, 1964) is a South Korean politician who served as the governor of Jeju Province from 2014 to 2021 and as the minister of land, infrastructure and transport from 2022 to 2023. A member of the People Power Party, he was a member of the National Assembly from 2000 to 2012.

Won was known to be a moderating force during his time in the conservative Saenuri Party (GNP's successor) and did not always adopt his party's policies and convictions.

== Early life and education ==
He graduated from the college of law in Seoul National University. He is well known for being ranked first in two major state examinations: the College Scholastic Ability Test (1982) and the National Judicial Exam (1992).

During his youth, he was a member of the Korean labour and student movements for 7 years, fighting for the right of labour and democratization.

Passing the 34th National Judicial Exam (1992) and completing courses at Judicial Research and Training Institute, he worked as a public prosecutor in Seoul, Yeoju, and Busan from 1995 to August 1998.

== Political career ==
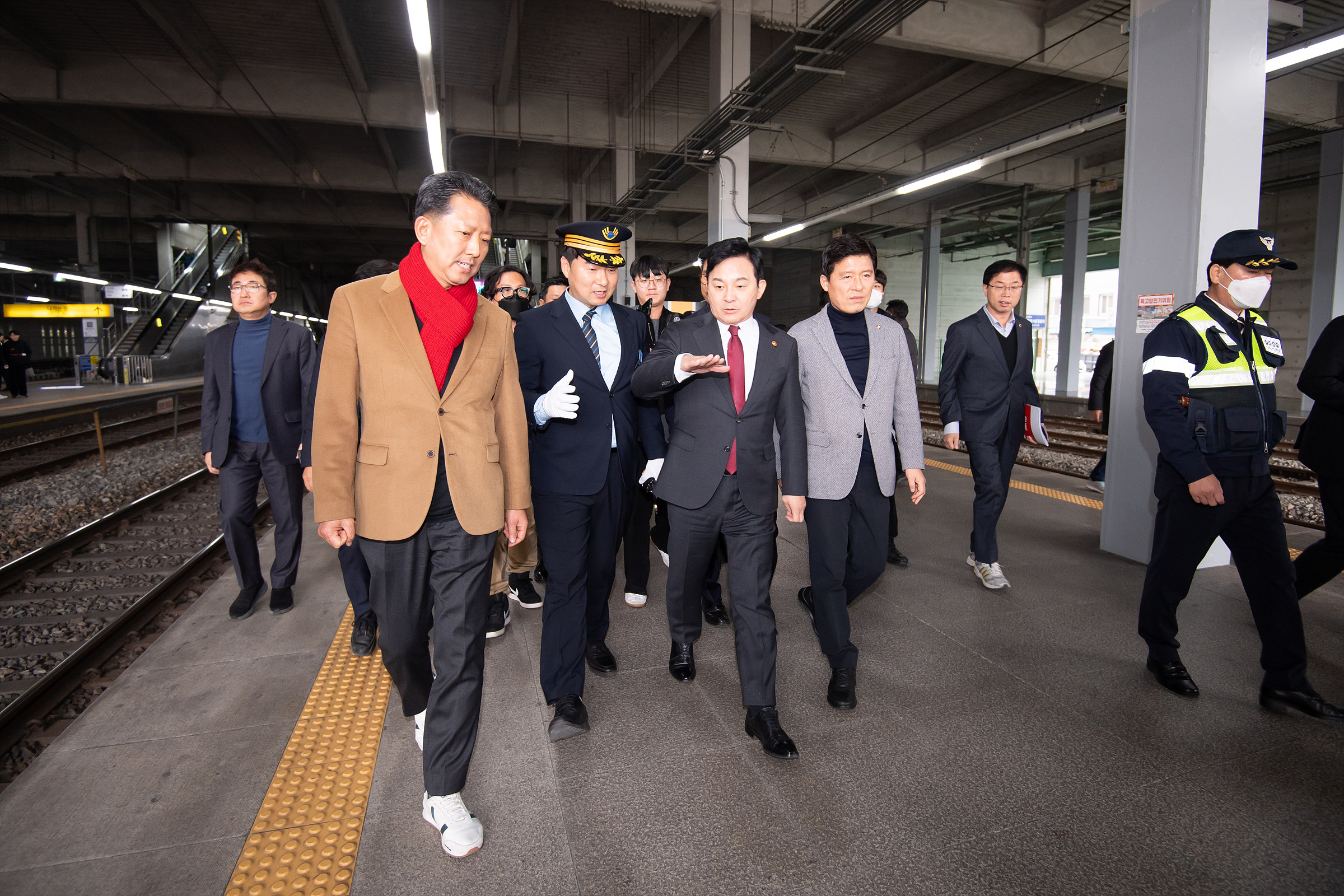
Minister of Land, Infrastructure and Transport Won visits Gumi in November 2023

In 2000, Won was elected as a member of the National Assembly for Yangchon A District. He was re-elected twice in 2004 and 2008.

He served as a member of the Science, Technology, Information & Telecommunication Committee, Legislation & Judiciary Committee (2002), Unification, Foreign Affairs & Trade Committee (2004), Finance & Economy Committee (2006), and Commerce, Industry & Energy Committee (2007) in the National Assembly.

He has been a member of World Economic Forum since 2003 and was elected as a young global leader by WEF (2005).

In 2005, Won wrote his life "I Am Dreaming Of Sub-Three."

In 2007, Won ran for the party presidential candidacy; he gained only 1% of the votes.

After retiring from the national assembly in 2012, Won ran and was elected the Governor of Jeju Province in 2014. He won re-election in 2018 as an independent candidate.

Won resigned as governor on August 11, 2021, to focus on his second presidential campaign. He survived primary and secondary elimination of the People Power Party presidential primaries and advanced to the final runoff.

In April 2022, he was nominated as Minister of Land, Infrastructure and Transport by Yoon Suk Yeol, then-president-elect. Controversies around his use of public money on omakase, and various traffic violations he committed over the years rose during his confirmation hearing.

== Election results ==
=== General elections ===
Year	Elections	Constituency	Political party	Votes (%)	Results
2000	16th National Assembly General Election	Yangcheon A (Seoul)	GNP	52,099 (51.15%)	Won
2004	17th National Assembly General Election	Yangcheon A (Seoul)	GNP	69,056 (56.58%)	Won
2008	18th National Assembly General Election	Yangcheon A (Seoul)	GNP	49,847 (52.11%)	Won
2024	22nd National Assembly General Election	Gyeyang B (Incheon)	PPP	40,616 (45.45%)	Defeated (2nd)

=== Local elections ===
==== Governor of Jeju ====
Year	Elections	Constituency	Political party	Votes (%)	Remarks
2014	6th Iocal Election	Jeju (Governoral Elections)	Saenuri	172,793 (59.97%)	Won
2018	7th Iocal Election	Jeju (Governoral Elections)	Independent	178,255 (51.72%)	Won
