= National Fire Service Academy (South Korea) =

South Korean fire service education facility

'The National Fire Service Academy (NFSA) is a fire service education facility operated by South Korean National Fire Agency. It was founded on May 16, 1995 and is located at 90, Yeondanjiji-gil, Sagok-myeon, Gongju, South Chungcheong Province, South Korea.

== Purpose ==
- The training of firefighters, firefighter candidates, medical officers and social service personnel working in the fire department.
- Fire safety training for the public, including firefighting safety experience training for students, medical firefighters, and volunteers.
- The study of firefighting policy and the research, development and dissemination of fire safety technology.
- Scientific investigation, research, analysis and evaluation of the causes of fires and dangerous chemicals.

== History ==
- July 27, 1978: established as the part of Ministry of Interior.
- September 4, 1978: Opening of the firefighting school (184, Gwang-dong, Suwon).
- May 16, 1995: Reorganized into NFSA.
- February 28, 1998: Changed to belong to the Ministry of Government Administration and Home Affairs.
- June 1, 2004: Changed to belong to the National Emergency Management Agency.
- November 19, 2014: Changed to belong to Ministry of Public Safety and Security.
- July 26, 2017: Changed to belong to the National Fire Agency.
- July 1, 2019: Moved to Yujin-dong, Dongnam District, Cheonan.

== Organization ==
- Education Support Division
- Human Resource Development Division
- Education and Training Division
- Recruiting Team

== See also ==
- Fire services in South Korea
