= Government Complex Seoul =

Government building in Jongno, South Korea

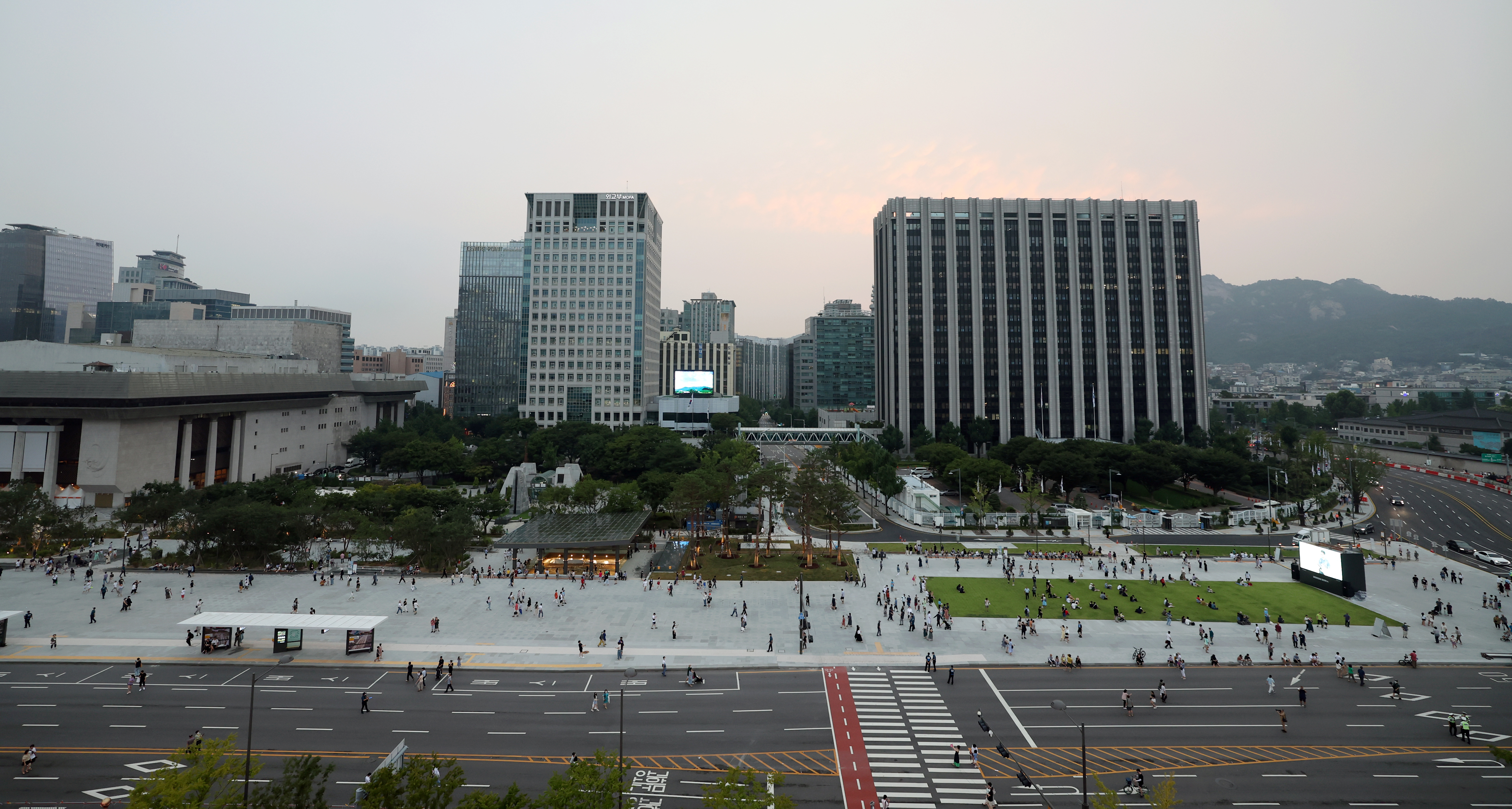
- Government Complex Seoul's main building and annex in Jongno, Seoul
- Interactive map of the Government Complex Seoul area
- Alternative names: Central Government Complex

General information
- Status: Used as government buildings for some of Ministries of South Korea
- Type: Government office complex
- Location: Sejong-daero 209, Jongno, Seoul, South Korea
- Coordinates: 37.574883°N 126.975212°E
- Cost: 4.7 billion won

Technical details
- Structural system: Reinforced concrete and steel

Website
- official page

Korean name
- Hangul: 정부서울청사
- Hanja: 政府서울廳舍
- RR: Jeongbu Seoul cheongsa
- MR: Chŏngbu Sŏul ch'ŏngsa

The Government Complex Seoul (Korean: 정부서울청사), formerly known as Central Government Complex (정부중앙청사) is a government office building complex in Jongno District, Seoul, South Korea.

It has one main building and two annex buildings. As of 2022, the complex is used by several Ministries of South Korea, including Financial Services Commission, Ministry of the Interior and Safety and Ministry of Unification.

== See also ==
- Government Complex, Daejeon
- Government Complex, Sejong
- Ministry of the Interior and Safety (South Korea)
- Central Disaster and Safety Countermeasures Headquarters
