= 2015 Ji'an bus accident =

Motor vehicle accident in Ji'an, China

Coordinates: 40°58′08.6″N 125°55′06.0″E

Ji'an bus accident
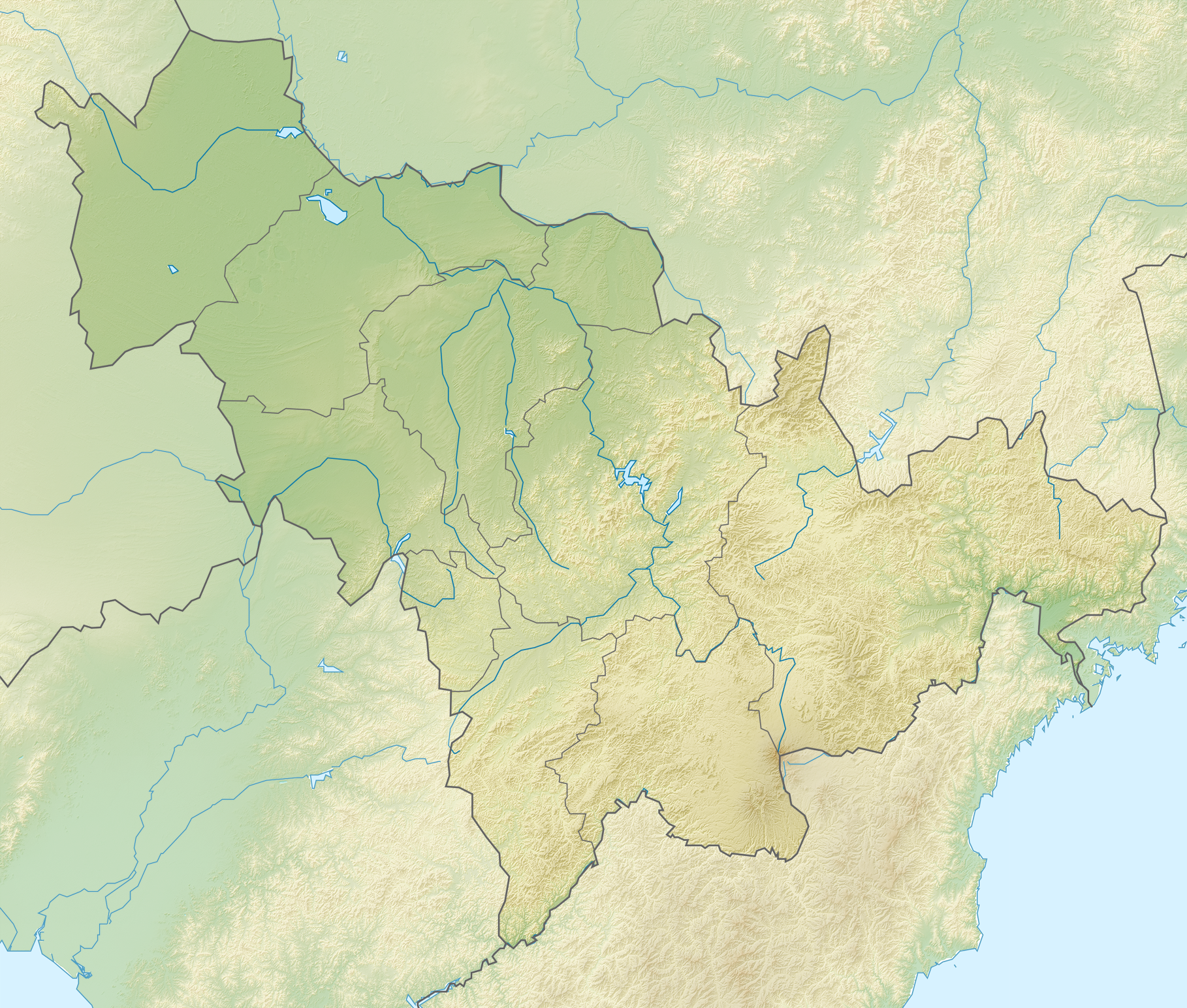
- Crash site (Jilin) Location shown near China–North Korea border

Details
- Date: July 1, 2015; 15:36 (3:36 p.m.)
- Location: Ji'an, Jilin
- Country: China
- Operator: Xinshiji Tour Agency
- Cause: excessive speed

Statistics
- Passengers: 28
- Deaths: 11
- Injured: 17

The Ji'an bus accident (Korean: 지안 버스 추락 사고; Chinese: 吉林旅行团大巴车坠桥事故) occurred on July 1, 2015, in Ji'an, China, in which a bus carrying visiting South Korean civil servants went off a bridge. Ten Koreans and the Chinese bus driver were killed, and another 17 were injured (eight seriously).

A Korean government official who traveled to China after the accident committed suicide on July 5, 2015, in Ji'an.

== Location ==
Ji'an is a popular tourist area in Northeast China due to the province's location on the China–North Korea border, with the two countries separated by the Yalu River, and is the location of the UNESCO World Heritage Site Capital Cities and Tombs of the Ancient Koguryo Kingdom. It has eight tourist routes to accommodate tourists, many en route to the DPRK.

South Korean officials said the accident victims were part of a 140-person delegation of mainly government employees, on a training program organized by the Local Government Officials Development Institute, which is affiliated with the Ministry of Government Administration and Home Affairs, travelling in a six-bus caravan. The group was in China to tour historical sites, including places where Korean independence fighters resisted Japan's colonial rule before the end of the Second World War.

== Accident ==
On July 1, 2015, a bus carrying 26 South Koreans and two Chinese in Ji'an drove off a bridge into a river some 15 metres (49 ft) below. The South Korea Ministry of Foreign Affairs released the initial report. The accident occurred around 15:30 (3:30 p.m.) local time, while the bus was traveling on the Ji-dan Highway (Chinese: 集丹公路) towards the Chinese border city of Dandong. The bridge was on a highway that links Yanji, Jilin province, with Dandong in the neighbouring Liaoning province. A screenshot from CCTV footage (with a timestamp of 15:36:21) shows the bus crashing through the north side of the bridge. The bus was owned by the Xinshiji Tour Agency.

All 28 passengers were injured or killed: eight died at the scene, one died after arriving at the hospital and the Chinese driver died at the hospital the following day. The remaining 17 passengers were injured, with eight reported in intensive care. One 36-year-old passenger's injuries were described as life-threatening.

The injured were initially treated at a Ji'an hospital, then transferred to the First Hospital of Jilin University in Changchun on July 2. Eighteen students majoring in Korean at the Jilin Huaqiao University of Foreign Languages in Changchun volunteered to serve as interpreters for each of the injured and their families, who began arriving from South Korea.

== Investigation ==
The cause for the accident is under investigation. Speeding and driver error may have led to the crash, which was captured on CCTV, Yonhap News Agency reported. No oncoming traffic was present on the bridge. A South Korean consular official in the nearby city of Shenyang was sent to the accident scene and an accident response team was formed. South Korea's Prime Minister Hwang Kyo-ahn made provisions for relevant authorities to work with China for the handling of the case. The China's Foreign Ministry reported they had contacted Seoul and would take care of funeral arrangements for the victims.

On July 5, 2015, in a preliminary report, Ji'an officials said they had determined speeding and improper turning to be the cause of the accident. The speed limit on the mountain road was 40 km/h (approximately 25 mph), in the section of the road, and the driver was reported to be travelling a speed of 64 to 88 km/h. City officials said that tests ruled out the possibility the driver was under the influence of drugs or alcohol.

== Suicide of Choi Doo-yeong ==
On July 5, a Republic of Korea official coordinating the aftermath of the accident was found dead in Ji'an in a suspected suicide. Choi Doo-yeong, 55, was president of the Republic of Korea's Local Government Officials’ Development Institute that organized the trip. He was found on the ground outside his hotel around 3 a.m. and is believed to have jumped to his death.

Yonhap News Agency reported Chinese officials had ruled out homicide based on surveillance images and witness testimony. Choi had accompanied Chung Chae-gun, Korea's Vice Minister of Government Administration and Home Affairs, to Ji'an after the accident to provide assistance.
