= Fire services in South Korea =

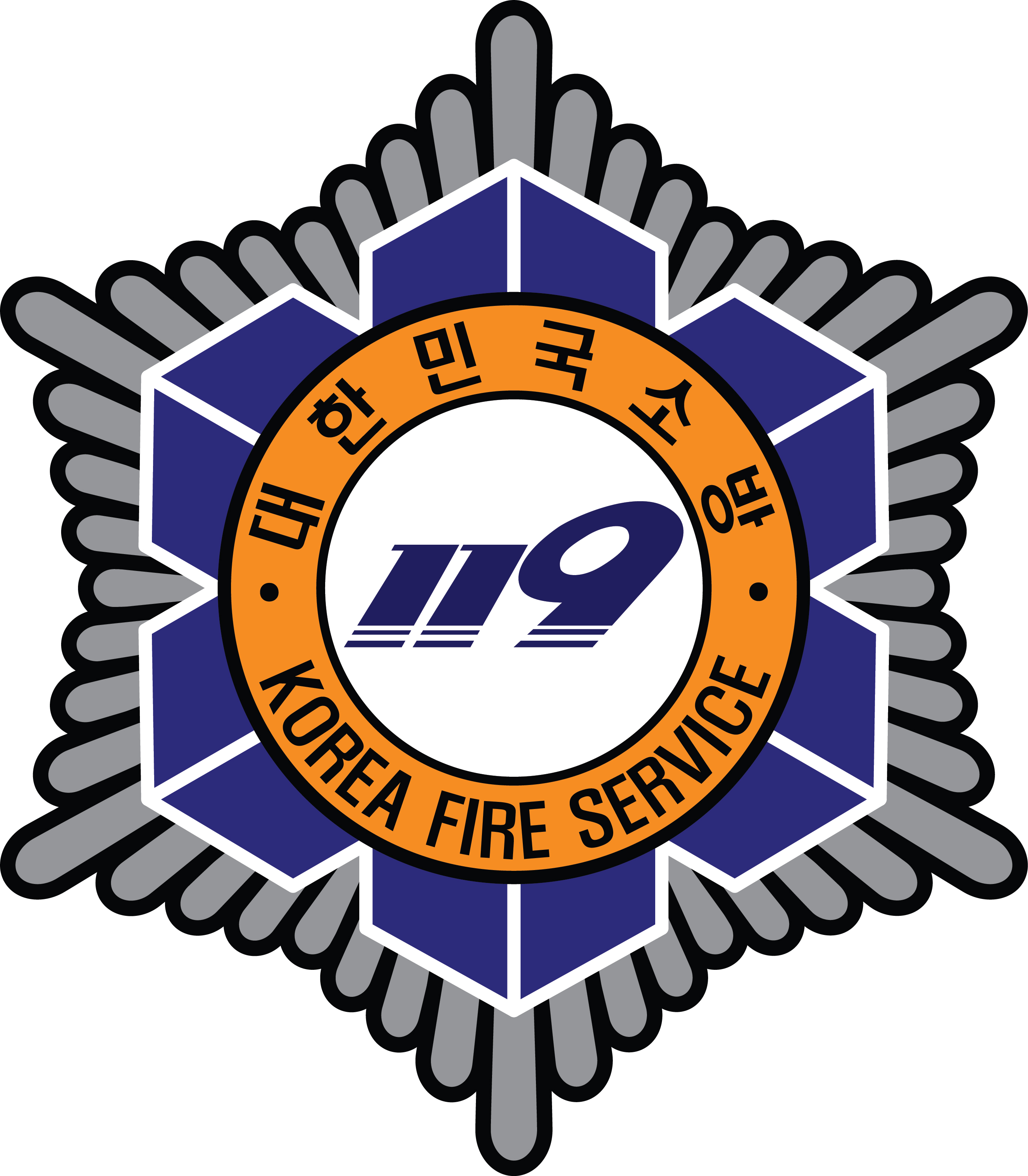
Logo of the Korea Fire Service

The Fire Service in South Korea (or Korea Fire Service) is an organization to prevent danger, to protect the Republic of Korea people's lives and property, fire suppression and rescue, relief of emergency patients, prevention of disaster, disaster response, and providing recovery after a disaster occurs. Fire fighters in South Korea are Fire officers, members of an obligatory fire-fighting unit, and volunteer fire fighters. Regarding fire fighting activities, the Framework Act on Fire Service, rescue and emergency activities are regulated by Act of 119 Rescue and Emergency Medical Services. The national fire department is the responsibility of the Ministry of Public Safety and Security, and the local fire department is in charge of the city and circuit fire headquarters.

There are multiple criticisms such as the problem of the command system, the status of the firefighting organization, and the poor treatment of the firefighters, although a plurality of organizations are set up to carry out firefighting activities.

== History ==
=== Before the Goryeo period ===
Fires in the Three Kingdoms of Korea were rather common. According to the Samguk sagi, fires occurred at the temple Hwangnyongsa in the 2nd, 6th, and 8th years of the reign of King Munmu. Furthermore, there are some records indicating that arson happened during this period as well.

=== Goryeo ===
During the Goryeo period, a national-level firefighting system started to emerge. Whilst no specialized organization existed at the time, fires were still controlled and prevented via the 'Gold Coin System' (금화제도). This system worked on a basis of punishment and insurance. Any officials found guilty of arson (or otherwise causing a fire) faced immediate dismissal. If a fire destroyed company property, the perpetrator would be sentenced to three years of imprisonment. Victims of the fire would receive compensation if their house was destroyed by the fire or if they were injured by the fire. Local governments appointed one official to be in charge of these funds – initially with little oversight. However, following a fire during the 20th year of Munjong of Goryeo's reign, these officials were subject occasional inspections by the Royal Inspectorate to ensure that the funds had not been misused. If the appointed individuals could not be found or were otherwise neglecting their duty, they were liable to face imprisonment or further punishment. Whilst this successfully did prevent some fires, the Goryeo era still suffered more fires than previous eras, as a consequence of rapid urbanization (with booming urban populations living in larger, densely-packed, flammable buildings providing ample opportunities for fires to start and spread).

=== Joseon Dynasty ===
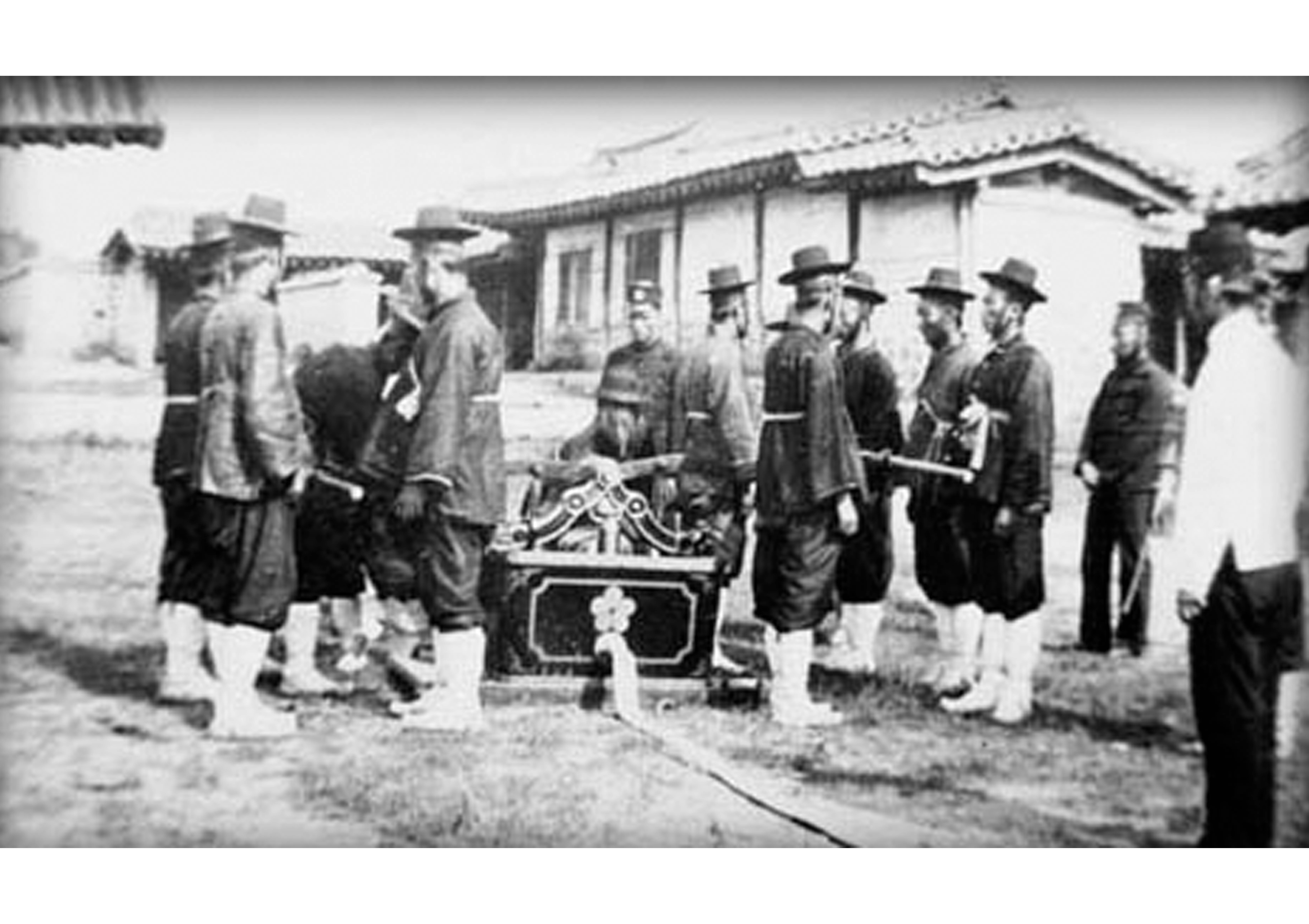
Training of the court fire brigade of the 1900s

The firefighting system of the Joseon Dynasty was systematically organized under the Joseon Gyeonggukjeon. In 1426 (the 8th year of King Sejong's reign), the "Geumhwadogam" (Fire Prevention Bureau), the first specialized firefighting organization on the Korean Peninsula, was established under the Ministry of Military Affairs (Byeongjo) to manage arson and fire prevention. In June of the same year, it was given the concurrent duty of managing rivers. However, later that year, following arguments that "it is a waste to have multiple offices established when there are no constant matters to govern daily, which only causes grievances, so let us merge them," it was merged into the "Suseonggeumhwadogam" (Dike and Fire Prevention Bureau) and placed under the Ministry of Public Works (Gongjo). In 1460 (the 6th year of King Sejo's reign), it was abolished by being integrated into the Hanseong-bu (Seoul Metropolitan Government), but was re-established as the "Suseonggeumhwasa" in 1481 (the 12th year of King Seongjong's reign) following the promulgation of the Gyeongguk daejeon .

In the early days, the "Geumhwagun" (Fire Fighting Army) suppressed fires. During King Sejo's reign, the Geumhwagun was renamed "Myeolhwagun" (Fire Extinguishing Army) and put on a 24-hour standby. However, after the Imjin War (Japanese invasions of Korea), the Suseonggeumhwasa was also abolished, and the Ministry of Military Affairs and Hanseong-bu handled fire prevention tasks as needed. In July 1894 (the 31st year of King Gojong's reign), with the finalization of the Gyeongmucheong (Police Bureau) regulations, the Gyeongmucheong was tasked with handling matters related to fires.

=== Korea under Japanese rule ===
Fire department in the Japanese emperor's fortune occupation is responsible for the Department of Protection or Security Department of the Governor-General of Korea. In the 1910s, firefighters were placed at the police office in Seoul and other major cities. They organized firefighting groups and arranged firefighters.In 1922, the Gyeongseong firefighting group was rebuilt by the Gyeongseong fire house, and in 1925, the first fire station of the Gyeongseong fire station rewrote.

=== United States Army Military Government in Korea and Republic of Korea ===
==== National Fire Service ====
In 1950 the National Fire Department of the Security Bureau was established, but in the same year it was reduced to being a directorate of the security department, and in 1955 the safety and protection department in charge of the fire department was in charge of the security department together with the guard department guard. The fire department was installed again in 1961 and was in charge of fire fighting work in the fire department of the Ministry of Internal Affairs and the Security Department of the Internal Affairs Department until 1971. In 1975 the civil defense fund law came into force and the Ministry became responsible for civil defense affairs, in which the NFD was partly responsible.

Since then, the National Emergency Management Agency was established in 2004 after the fire accident of the Daegu subway and the typhoon, but was dismantled by the Sinking of MV Sewol in 2014 and was transferred to the Ministry of Public Safety and Security. In 2017, on the basis of the Central Fire Service, the National Fire Agency was established as the country's singular firefighting service.

==== Local Fire Service ====
In 1945, the fire department was established in the local government police department during the US military rule. In 1946, the Fire Fire Defense Committee and the municipal fire department were established, the Fire Department was established in 1947 and it was autonomous under the Ministry of Commerce, but in 1948 belonged to the state police administration regime. The fire department was established in Seoul and Busan in 1972, and in 1975, it was responsible for firefighting affairs in the fire department of the Civil affairs administration of each circuit. Since 1976 the mayor and county guard were in charge of firefighting work only in areas where fire stations were not established, but in 1992 the circuit Fire headquarters was established and reached the present.

== Fire service structure ==
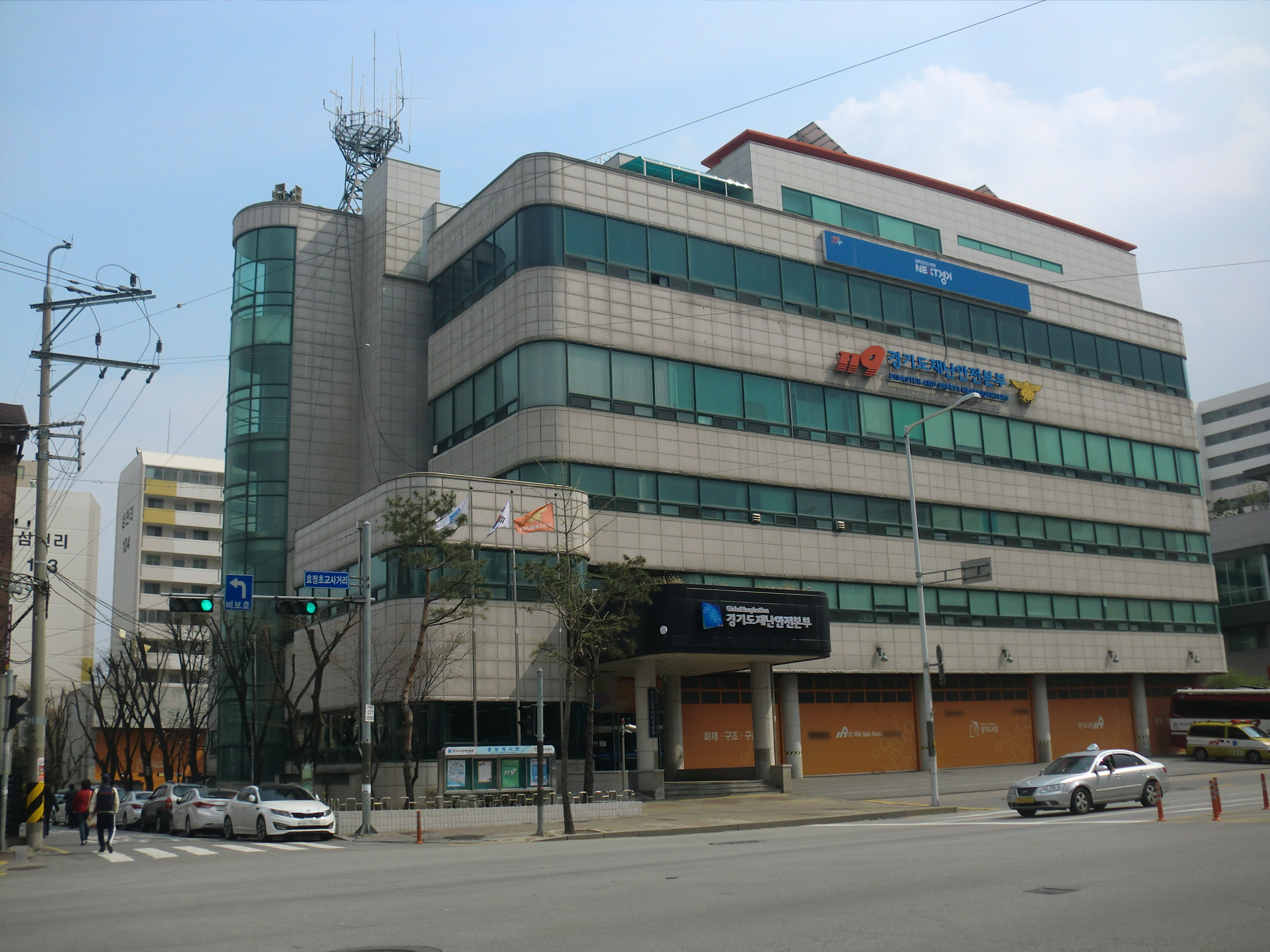
Gyeonggi Provincial Fire and Rescue Services

The firefighting organization of the Republic of Korea consists of the National Fire Agency under the Ministry of Interior and Security and the city or circuit firefighting headquarters. Under the NFA's administrative supervision there are National 119 Rescue Headquarters and a National Fire Service Academy, and under the city or circuit Firefight Headquarters there are fire stations and local fire academies. The NFA is responsible to the central government, while the city or county fire headquarters is managed by the local government respectively.

=== Central Fire Service ===
- National Fire Agency
  - National 119 Rescue Headquarters

=== Local Fire Service ===
==== City Fire Service ====
- Seoul Fire Services
- Busan Fire Safety Headquarters
- Daegu Fire Department
- Incheon Fire Department
- Gwangju Fire Department
- Daejeon Fire Department
- Sejong Fire Department
- Ulsan Fire Department
- Changwon Fire Service Headquarters

==== Provincial Fire Service ====
- Gyeonggi Disaster and Safety Headquarters
- Gyeonggi Northern Fire Headquarters
- Gangwon Fire Headquarters
- Chungbuk Fire Service Headquarter
- Chungnam Fire Service Headquarter
- Jeonbuk Fire Service
- Jeonnam Fire Service
- Gyeongbuk Fire Service Headquarters
- Gyeongsangnam-do Fire Department
- Jeju Fire Safety Headquarters

=== Firefighting Authorities ===
==== National Fire Agency ====
The National Fire Agency is an organization separated from the Central Fire Headquarters of the Ministry of Public Safety and Security on July 26, 2017, and is responsible for firefighting operations at the national level.

==== Fire department ====
In principle, these departments are established by each metropolitan local government and serve as the upper organizations for front-line fire stations. Originally, they could not be established in basic local governments; however, as an exception, the Changwon Fire Headquarters was established under a special act.

==== Fire academy ====
This includes the Central Fire Academy and various local fire academies, aiming to promote the education and training of firefighting civil servants, as well as the research and advancement of firefighting operations.

==== Fire station ====
As front-line departments that perform firefighting operations, these institutions are responsible for fire suppression, rescue, and emergency medical services (EMS) within their respective jurisdictions.

==== 119 Safety Center ====
Operating as subordinate units of fire stations, 119 Safety Centers hold jurisdiction over towns, townships, and neighborhoods (Eup/Myeon/Dong) to extinguish fires and rescue emergency patients in their designated areas. They consist of fire suppression teams and EMS teams.

==== 119 Rescue squad ====
In principle, one 119 Rescue Squad is established per fire station, dedicating itself entirely to rescue operations within the station's jurisdiction. Rescue squads are divided into General Rescue Squads, Special Rescue Squads (Chemical, Maritime, Mountain, Expressway, and Subway Rescue Squads), Directly Affiliated Rescue Squads, and Counter-Terrorism Rescue Squads.

==== 119 Local Station ====
Operating as subordinate units of 119 Safety Centers, 119 Local Stations are established in areas where the population is too small to warrant a full safety center and the distance to the nearest center is far. One to three firefighting civil servants work at these stations.

=== Status controversies ===
When the National Emergency Management Agency was integrated into the Central Fire Headquarters of the Ministry of Public Safety and Security, the rank of Fire Commissioner General was abolished, causing the head of the fire service to be demoted. This led to arguments that the morale of firefighting civil servants was dropping. Petitions were filed protesting the demotion of the top leader's rank without any wrongdoing and the dissolution of the National Emergency Management Agency.

On the other hand, the Ministry of Security and Public Administration countered, "The proposal to establish the National Security Agency does not reduce the function or status of firefighting." They explained, "Since all vice ministers under the Government Organization Act are political appointees, the vice minister of the National Security Agency was also designated as a political appointee," adding, "A firefighting official could be appointed as the minister or vice minister, so the rank of the Disaster Management Agency is not being lowered." They further clarified, "Field response personnel and special maneuver forces will be significantly reinforced, and the announced plan for the National Security Agency expands firefighting functions rather than reducing them." Additionally, another official from the Ministry of Security and Public Administration stated, "Currently, vice ministers of all ministries are designated as political appointees, but during the legislative discussion process, we could consider a plan to define the vice minister of the National Security Agency as either a political appointee or a firefighting civil servant."

However, movements to prevent the dissolution of the National Emergency Management Agency emerged, and the firefighter who filed the petition argued, "Since both the minister and vice minister of the National Security Agency are political appointees, only a Fire Senior Superintendent General can be appointed among firefighting officials. There is no position for a Fire Commissioner General, which practically means a reduction in status," and added, "The Chief of the Fire Headquarters under the National Security Agency would hold the same rank as the chiefs of the Seoul and Gyeonggi Fire Headquarters, causing issues in establishing command authority." He also criticized that the promise of 'significantly expanding personnel and strengthening existing functions' is merely administrative exhibitionism, stating, "The rescue team members belonging to the Central 119 Rescue Headquarters account for only 0.38% of the country's firefighting personnel (151 people), while firefighting officials belonging to cities and provinces make up 99.62% (39,197 people)," and "There is no plan to expand the functions and personnel of city and province fire headquarters and fire stations." Furthermore, regarding the Ministry of Security and Public Administration's explanation that they would 'finalize the government proposal by gathering various opinions,' he insisted, "Unlike other administrative agencies, the National Security Agency is an institution that emphasizes lifesaving and command functions, so a specific-term civil servant capable of on-site command should be appointed as the deputy head in accordance with its characteristics." Due to these criticisms, changes were made, such as appointing the Chief of the Central Fire Headquarters of the Ministry of Public Safety and Security as a Fire Commissioner General. Following its separation into the National Fire Agency, changes continued, including the appointment of both the Commissioner and Deputy Commissioner of the National Fire Agency from among firefighting officials.

=== Non-compliance with Fire Station Establishment Regulations ===
In principle, one fire station should be established in each city, county, or district (Si/Gun/Gu), but this regulation is not being followed. After analyzing fire casualties, the Gangwon State Fire Headquarters confirmed that there is a significant difference in mortality rates depending on the presence of a fire station, highlighting the importance of establishing them. However, since establishing a single fire station costs around 7 billion KRW, local governments with poor financial independence are responding passively to the creation of new fire stations.

== Fire officers ==
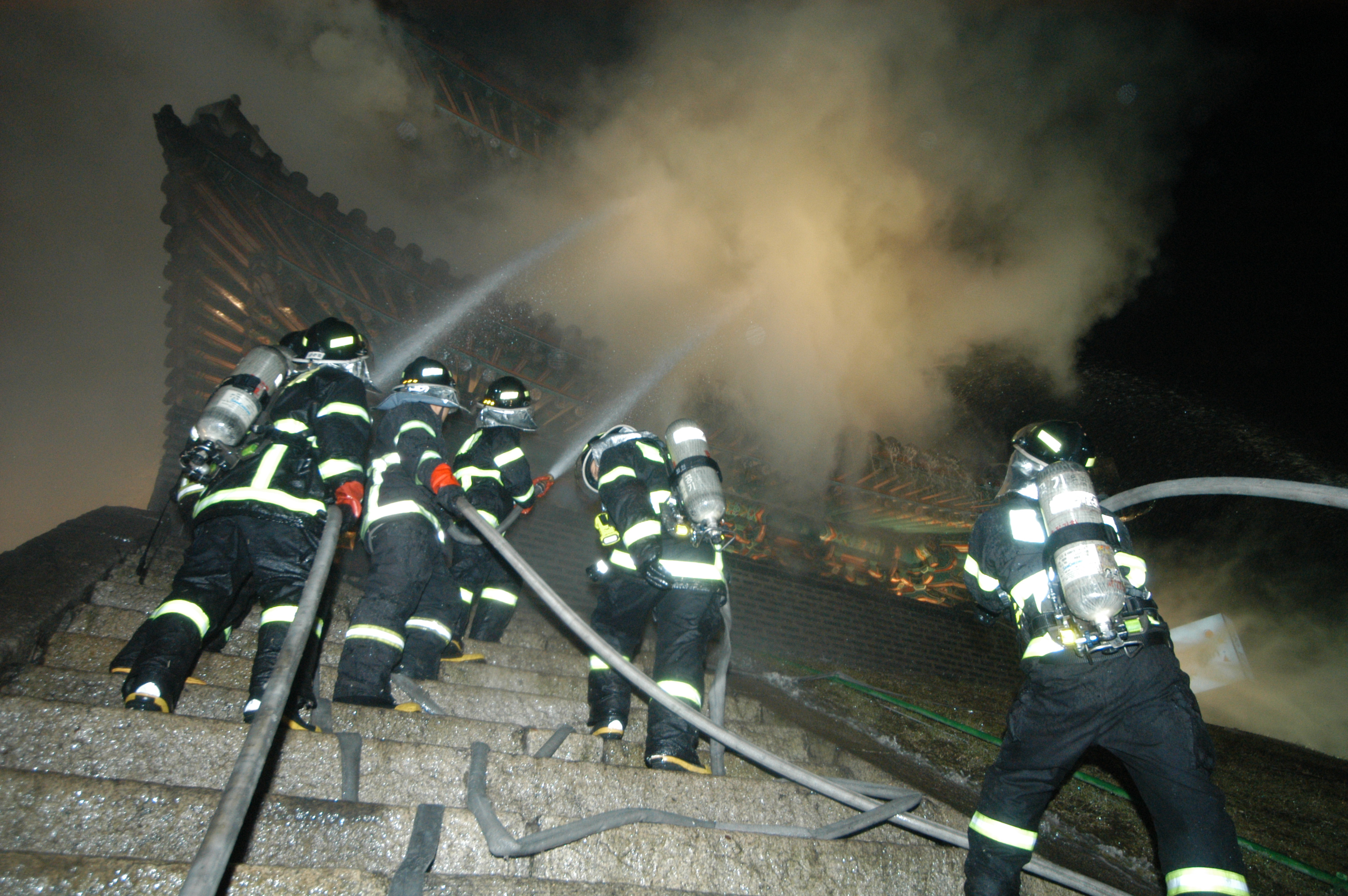
Firefighters extinguishing the flames during the 2008 Namdaemun fire.

A firefighter (消防官) refers to a person who performs firefighting duties as a profession and is a colloquial term for a firefighting civil servant. Firefighters in South Korea are divided into 119 Fire Suppression Teams, 119 Rescue Squads, and 119 Emergency Medical Services (EMS) Teams according to their duties. This is merely an operational distinction; legally, all suppression personnel, rescue members, and EMS paramedics are firefighting civil servants, and they must complete the rescue course trained at a fire academy. Each EMS team must include at least one certified emergency medical technician (EMT) or registered nurse. The appointing authority lies with the chief of the fire station, who rotates personnel based on their qualifications.

- 119 Fire Suppression Personnel: Assigned to 119 Safety Centers, these firefighting civil servants perform the core duties of firefighting, focusing primarily on fire prevention and suppression. No specialized certifications are required.
- 119 Rescue Personnel: Assigned to 119 Rescue Squads, these firefighting civil servants prioritize lifesaving operations, handling search and rescue missions at disaster scenes.
- 119 EMS Personnel (Paramedics): Assigned to 119 Safety Centers, these firefighting civil servants provide emergency treatment to the injured or those in critical condition while rapidly transporting them to hospitals for medical care.
- Aviation Rescue and EMS Personnel: Firefighting civil servants who board firefighting helicopters within aviation units to perform rescue and EMS operations

=== Rank ===
Rank insignia of Fire Sub-deputy Chief

Rank insignia of Fire Captain

Rank insignia of Probationary Firefighter

Ranks are divided into 11 national ranks and 10 local ranks (historically). Non-commissioned officers—Firefighter Candidate, Firefighter, Fire Corporal, and Fire Sergeant—feature an emblem with a fire nozzle and hose beneath a water crystal symbol that signifies "purification and improvement." Middle management officers—Fire Lieutenant, Fire Captain, Fire District Chief, and Fire Chief—wear a six-pointed emblem that encloses the non-commissioned officer badge without the nozzle and hose. High-ranking commanders—Fire Assistant Joon-gam, Fire Gam, Fire Jeong-gam, and Fire Commissioner General—wear a five-pointed star shape with a Taegeuk symbol in the center, surrounding the Fire Lieutenant badge.

=== Appointment of firefighting civil servants ===
The recruitment process for firefighting civil servants in South Korea is as follows. The appointing authority has been dualized between the Commissioner of the National Fire Agency (for national firefighting civil servants) and the governors of each province or mayors of metropolitan cities (hereinafter referred to as city/province governors, for local firefighting civil servants).

- Special Recruitment for Bar Exam and Grade 5 Publicly Recruited (Administrative) Passers: Appointed directly to the rank of Fire District Chief, equivalent to a division chief at a local fire station.
- Fire Officer Candidates: 30 candidates are selected annually. After completing one year of junior officer training at the Central Fire Academy, they are appointed as Fire Lieutenants.
- Public Recruitment for Firefighters: In addition to open competitive examinations, special recruitment tracks exist for discharged Conscripted Firefighters and veterans who served in special forces for over two years to be appointed as Firefighters.

=== Gender equality policy ===
As of May 2018, there were 3,605 female personnel working in South Korean fire agencies, accounting for 7.82% of all firefighting civil servants. The highest rank achieved among female firefighters is Fire Chief, though the number decreased from five to four.

However, some argue that most female general firefighters who are not EMS paramedics are assigned to administrative desk jobs rather than field positions, and because their physical fitness test standard is, on average, only 65% of that for men, they are effectively excluded from field-available forces. Naturally, there are opposing views on this; physical fitness measurements during the training of female firefighting civil servants are conducted identically to men, and assigning non-EMS female firefighters to administrative positions is usually just a matter of following personnel orders.

=== Working hours and occupational illnesses ===
Most field-duty firefighting civil servants work under a two-shift system, working 84 hours per week. This is more than double the statutory working hours in South Korea, which is 40 hours a week. This causes a drop in morale among firefighters and serves as the primary basis for their demand for a three-shift system. Furthermore, there is almost no support for the treatment of post-traumatic stress disorder (PTSD), and out of a total workforce of 37,894, 21,376 are suffering from or suspected of having occupational diseases. Firefighters with confirmed occupational diseases accounted for 14.3%. However, due to negative personnel repercussions upon applying for official on-the-job injury compensation, 88% of injured firefighters failed to apply. Even when leukemia or blood cancer develops due to job connectivity, the Government Employees Pension Service often refuses to recognize it as an on-the-job injury. Although the Supreme Court recognized job connectivity in 2008, subsequent applications continue to receive non-approval decisions.

=== Personnel shortage issues ===
In regions like Gyeonggi-do and Jeollanam-do, a three-shift system was implemented, but because it was executed without increasing the total headcount, the mandatory quotas for responding squads could not be met. In the case of a 119 Safety Center where 11 personnel work divided into two shifts, only 1 member is dedicated to fire suppression. At the time of the Jangseong Hyoami Hospital fire accident, the actual working staff at the Samgye 119 Safety Center under the Damyang Fire Station—which first responded to the fire report—was 5 out of a total of 6 personnel. Since two of them were already deployed to another scene, only three rushed to the fire site. Beyond this, due to the lack of personnel, "lone local stations" exist where a single firefighter is responsible for fire suppression, rescue, EMS, and driving the fire engine all at once. According to the status of "lone local stations" submitted by the National Emergency Management Agency to Representative Kim Hyun of the New Politics Alliance for Democracy on September 24, 2013, the number reached 538 as of December 31, 2012. While it trended down to 81 in 2014 and 59 in 2016, local stations left completely unmanned with no firefighters stationed reached as many as 132.

Points have also been raised that the overall workforce itself is deficient. While a single police officer in South Korea is responsible for 500 residents, a firefighting official covers 1,306 residents. Gyeonggi-do was the most understaffed with 1,989 residents per firefighter, while Gangwon-do was the most favorable with 673. In the case of Suwon city, the police operated with 1,600 personnel across three stations, whereas the fire service was limited to just 370 personnel across a single station. Although budgets are dispatched to local provinces to reinforce firefighting capabilities, there is no way to prevent those funds from being spent elsewhere, and when special allocation taxes are granted, an equivalent amount is often deducted from existing budgets and diverted. As a result, as of the end of 2014, while 50,493 field-deployable firefighting civil servants were required, the actual number available was only 29,783—falling short by 20,710 with a vacancy rate of 41%. It is noted that this extreme staff shortage causes poor emergency response at scenes and inadequate maintenance of equipment during normal times. In 2018, the overall shortage rate slightly eased to 37%, but the regional disparity remained massive. The National Fire Agency had a plan to recruit 20,000 firefighting civil servants by 2022, and through continuous expansion, the headcount increased to around 66,000 as of March 2023; however, criticisms persist that firefighting personnel are inefficiently operated, as the population covered by a single firefighter varies up to 3.5 times depending on the local government.

=== Transition to national status and local administrative issues ===
Prior to April 1, 2020, unlike the police, all firefighting civil servants—excluding those in the central National Emergency Management Agency and senior officials ranked Fire Assistant Joon-gam or higher—were local civil servants belonging to their respective regional governments. This setup occurred because front-line firefighting duties were delegated to each local government. All administrative matters, including appointments and promotions, were left to regional governors, which many argued lowered morale, hindered welfare improvements, and disrupted the overall development of fire services.Critics also pointed out that since equipment and personnel expansion were handled independently by each municipality, budgets were wasted while efficiency plummeted. Due to these issues, firefighters continuously demanded a transition to national status since 2001.

However, on May 28, 2014, the Ministry of Security and Public Administration stated, "In foreign nations, firefighting is also a local administrative task, and municipalities are the first to respond to fires. Making the fire service a national track upon the creation of the National Security Agency would be inefficient." In response, a firefighter who posted a plea to stop the dissolution of the National Emergency Management Agency countered, "Speaking of the most advanced fire services in the US and Japan, it is common sense that it is a state task in the US, but most of those states are larger than South Korea. We must view a US state under the concept of a nation." He added, "In Japan, fire stations in cities, towns, and villages handle all kinds of disasters. It is entirely different from South Korea. It is a powerful fire administration system where the fire station encompasses all disaster prevention work. This is vastly different from a setup where administrative bureaucrats in a 'Safety Coordination Division' engage in paperwork like 'submit data, establish plans,' or separating maritime disasters to the Coast Guard and land disasters to the fire service."

Representative Lee Jae-oh of the Saenuri Party proposed a bill in April 2013 to shift firefighting civil servants to national status, and Senior Deputy Floor Leader Kim Young-rok of the New Politics Alliance for Democracy proposed a similar bill in June 2014. The Moon Jae-in administration, which took office in 2017, actively pushed for the nationalization of firefighting civil servants, though opposition existed among regional governors who argued it went against administrative decentralization.

Following the passage of the Firefighting Civil Servants Act (Alternative) at the 11th plenary session of the 371st National Assembly on November 19, 2019, their status was formally shifted to national civil servants on April 1, 2020. However, because firefighting operations are still categorized as local autonomous administrative duties, it is evaluated as a "half-baked national status transition."

=== Other treatment issues ===
During the Hongje-dong residential fire in 2001, it was pointed out that firefighting civil servants were merely provided with waterproof coats (raincoats), and proper turnout gear and breathing apparatus were not adequately supplied until 2011. In 2024, the variety show The Backpacker Chef 2 highlighted that the meal cost per unit for firefighters was a mere 4,000 KRW, but subsequent investigations revealed that the actual national average was even lower, in the 3,000 KRW range.

== Disaster response ==
The firefighting organization responds to various social and natural disasters. Under the past response system, the Ministry of Security and Public Administration was in charge of human-made and social disasters, while the National Emergency Management Agency managed natural disasters; however, they were integrated with the establishment of the Ministry of Public Safety and Security, which then took charge of all disasters.

As of 2018, disaster management is handled by the Ministry of the Interior and Safety, land-based disaster response by the National Fire Agency and regional fire headquarters, and maritime disaster response by the Korea Coast Guard. In the event of a large-scale national disaster, the Central Disaster and Safety Countermeasures Headquarters may be established, and for large-scale regional disasters, Regional Disaster and Safety Countermeasures Headquarters may be set up at the metropolitan local government level. In such cases, for lifesaving operations, the firefighting organization can establish the "Central Emergency Rescue Control Group" at the National Fire Agency for national-scale disasters, the "Si/Gun/Gu Emergency Rescue Control Group" at fire stations for regional-scale disasters, and the "Si/Do Emergency Rescue Control Group" at fire headquarters.

But in the case of wildfires, prevention and monitoring are handled by 5-month fixed-term contract workers of local governments, and suppression is managed by local government contract workers or the Specialized Wildfire Disaster Suppression Force under the Korea Forest Service, who are 10-month fixed-term contract workers; firefighting agencies respond as related organizations in cooperation.

For disasters occurring at airports, Incheon International Airport was initially handled by an outsourced contractor under the Incheon International Airport Corporation, which then transitioned to a temporary subsidiary of the corporation, and Incheon International Airport Corporation plans to manage it directly in the future. At other airports, outsourced fire and rescue teams under contract with the Korea Airport Corporation provide the primary response, but since they are private/insourced fire brigades, they are not recognized as official fire brigades.

== Firefighting equipment ==
=== Mobile equipment ===
A command vehicle is operated for command purposes during firefighting operations and responds to all disaster scenes. A pump truck (pumper) is a fire engine specialized in extinguishing fires; each safety center operates one or two of them, and a team of four to five suppression personnel responds together. A water tanker is designed to carry a much larger volume of water than a pump truck; it supplies water when a pump truck or other fire engines run out, helping to suppress fires smoothly. A chemical truck uses specialized extinguishing agents to suppress special fires caused by oil or chemical substances. Aerial water tower trucks smash windows to suppress fires on high floors, while turntable ladder trucks and articulating ladder trucks are used to rescue lives. Heavy rescue vehicles specialize in lifesaving operations using rescue equipment at various disaster scenes, and ambulances provide emergency treatment to patients while transporting them to hospitals. In addition, smoke ejector trucks remove smoke when underground areas are filled with smoke, light tower trucks support nighttime operations, firefighting helicopters respond to mountain and water accidents, and fireboats are deployed for maritime incidents.

=== Suppression equipment ===
A "suquan" refers to a fire hose, which connects to fire hydrants or fire engine pumps to supply water. They come in diameters of 40mm and 65mm, using screw-type couplings. A fire nozzle is attached to the end of the hose to prevent twisting, allowing firefighters to hold it during suppression to control the water flow and spray patterns. When fighting a fire without a fire engine or hydrant by using stagnant water, a portable fire pump is temporarily installed.

=== Rescue equipment ===
To rescue trapped individuals, power cutters are used to forcibly cut through doors, and hydraulic spreaders are used to pry open gaps without cutting. To save isolated individuals, multipurpose pneumatic line-throwing guns are used to launch ropes or capture dangerous animals, and searchlights are used to enter fire scenes and rescue people.

=== Personal equipment ===
To protect firefighters, fire helmets, turnout gear (turnout coats and pants), safety boots, self-contained breathing apparatus (SCBA), and heat-resistant proximity suits are provided. SCBA began to be fully distributed following a fatal line-of-duty accident in 1996, and turnout gear began to be fully distributed after the tragic Hongje-dong fire accident in 2001.

=== Firefighting equipment replacement issues ===
A firefighter belonging to the Incheon Fire Safety Headquarters posted on his Twitter, "My helmet melted and shrank, and my turnout gear burned yellow. Currently, most firefighters across the country are wearing this equipment." He further claimed, "However, in 2012, lawmakers completely eliminated the budget for purchasing firefighting equipment," and indeed, the National Assembly completely cut the 40.2 billion KRW equipment replacement budget requested by the National Emergency Management Agency.

Furthermore, since state subsidies account for only 20%, the provision and replacement of equipment are being delayed depending on the financial conditions of local governments. The National Emergency Management Agency stated, "This is an exaggeration of isolated incidents," adding, "While timing may be delayed due to regional financial gaps, instances of non-provision are almost non-existent," and "No complaints have been received from local fire stations." However, Representative Kim Hyun of the New Politics Alliance for Democracy pointed out, "This is a situation that has been brought up every year during the parliamentary audit," revealing that 21.7% of turnout gear, 6% of fire hoods, 20.8% of safety boots, 24.2% of helmets, and 21.1% of fire engines had exceeded their service life, and claimed that individuals even purchase necessary gear like gloves and operational boots out of their own pockets.

Additionally, instead of proper fire-resistant gloves, agricultural rubber gloves were sometimes distributed, and points have been raised regarding the absolute shortage of personal equipment itself.

=== Defective apparel controversy ===
From 2013 to 2015, it was revealed that around 5,000 sets of turnout gear that had not undergone proper inspection were distributed to the front lines, leading the Ministry of Public Safety and Security to suspend their use. Subsequently, it was uncovered that around 60,000 daily station uniforms were also supplied without separate inspections. However, the manufacturers countered, "When the contract was finalized and initial deliveries were made, all inspection and certification procedures were followed. When exchange requests due to sizing or promotions came in, we sent certified products if we had stock; if not, we newly manufactured and sent clothes using the same materials, which is when they missed the inspection," adding, "Collect them and test them." Afterward, the Ministry of Public Safety and Security filed complaints against the suppliers and announced, "We have never investigated uncertified products," but in reality, they had collected them and confirmed there was no issue with performance. The manufacturers argued that they were suffering damages because the Ministry confirmed these results but failed to inform the media. Eventually, the Ministry of Public Safety and Security inspected the controversial turnout gear, confirmed that they met the standards, and decided to allow firefighters to wear them again.

== Depictions in media ==
=== Films ===
- Siren (2000 film) (2000)
- Libera Me (2000)
- Sad Movie (2005)
- Tidal Wave (2009)
- Two Doors (2012)
- Love 911 (2012)
- The Tower (2012)
- Tunnel (2016)
- Along with the Gods: The Two Worlds (2017)
- Cheer Up, Mr. Lee (2019)
- The Firefighters (2024)

=== Television series ===
- Angel Eyes (2014)
- Naked Fireman (2017)
- Forest (2020)
- The First Responders (2022)
- Love Next Door (2024)

=== Webtoons ===
- PEAK
- Call Sign
- 1 Second

== See also ==
- Ministry of Public Safety and Security
- 의무소방대 – 위키백과, 우리 모두의 백과사전
- Hongje-dong fire accident in 2001.
