= Lee Jae-jung =

South Korean politician

- 이재정

Member of the National Assembly
- Incumbent
- Assumed office 30 May 2020
- Preceded by: Shim Jae-chul
- Constituency: Gyeonggi Anyang Dongan B
- In office 30 May 2016 – 29 May 2020
- Constituency: Proportional representation

Personal details
- Born: 2 August 1974 (age 52) Daegu, South Korea
- Party: Democratic
- Education: Kyungpook National University
- Religion: Roman Catholic (Christian name: Agnes)

Korean name
- Hangul: 이재정
- Hanja: 李在汀
- RR: I Jaejeong
- MR: I Chaejŏng

Lee Jae-jung (Korean: 이재정; born 2 August 1974) is a South Korean politician and lawyer.

She first became a member of National Assembly via proportional representation in the 2016 general election. She became widely known to the public through her legislative efforts to transform status of firefighters and paramedics to federal employees guaranteeing sufficient resources for fire service. She has taken several roles in her party such as a party spokesperson from August 2018 and deputy head of its think tank from September 2019.

In the 2020 general election, she defeated Shim Jae-chul, then floor leader of the main opposition party and five-term parliamentarian.

== Electoral history ==
Election	Year	District	Party affiliation	Votes	Percentage of votes	Results
20th National Assembly General Election	2016	Proportional representation (5th)	Democratic Party	6,069,744	25.54%	Elected
21st National Assembly General Election	2020	Gyeonggi Anyang Dongan B	Democratic Party	49,736	54.15%	Won
22nd National Assembly General Election	2024	Gyeonggi Anyang Dongan B	Democratic Party	52,248	53.86%	Won
