= Kim Myeong-hyeon =

Korean civil servant

Kim Myeong-hyeon 김명현 金明顯
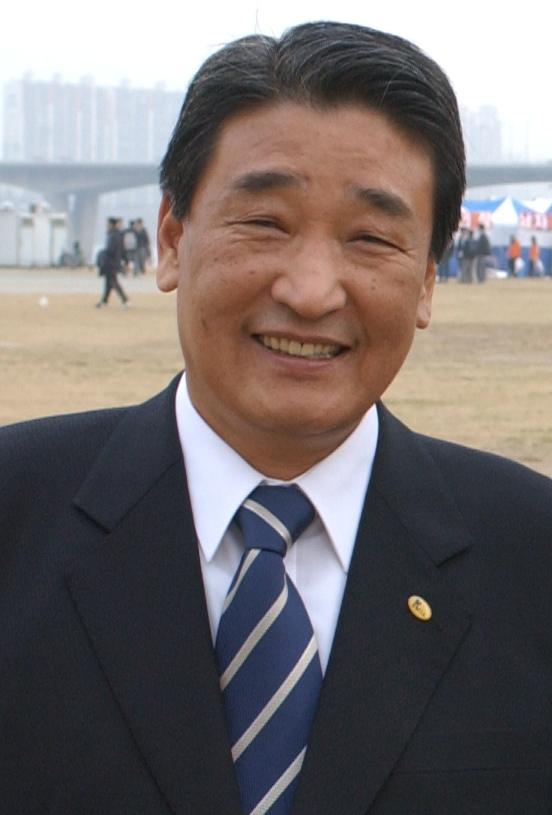
- Portrait of Myeong-hyeon

Administrator, National Emergency Management Agency
- In office 19 Dec 2001 – 28 June 2003
- President: Kim Dae-jung, Roh Moo-hyun
- Preceded by: Shin Ju-yeong
- Succeeded by: Nam Sang-ho

Personal details
- Born: 29 December 1948 (age 77) Seoul, South Korea
- Education: Korea University(MA); Inha University

Kim Myeong-hyeon (Korean: 김명현; born 29 December 1948) is former Administrator of National Emergency Management Agency of the Ministry of Public Administration and Security. He was also Chairman of Korea Fire Safety Association, where he is currently serving as senior advisor.

== Experiences ==
- 1991 - Commissioner, Seongnam Fire Department (Gyeonggi)
- 1997 - Commissioner, Incheon Fire & Safety Management Department
- 1999 - Commissioner, Busan Fire Department
- 2001~2003 - Administrator, National Emergency Management Agency, Ministry of Public Administration and Security
- 2004~2007 - Chairman, Korea Fire Safety Association
- 2007~ - Senior Advisor, Korea Fire Safety Association

== Awards ==
- Presidential Award(1987)
- Green Stripes Order of Service Merit(1993)

== Books ==
- "Introduction to Fire Protection Studies" (cheongmungak, 2007) ISBN 89-92592-39-6
