= Ministry of Security and Public Administration =

2008–2014 South Korean government agency

Ministry of Security and Public Administration, Republic of Korea
- 안전행정부

Agency overview
- Formed: February 29, 2008
- Preceding agency: Ministry of Public Administration and Security
- Dissolved: November 19, 2014
- Superseding agency: * Ministry of Government Administration and Home Affairs; Ministry of Public Safety and Security; Ministry of Personnel Management
- Jurisdiction: Government of South Korea
- Headquarters: Central Government Complex, Jongno-gu, Seoul, South Korea
- Annual budget: ₩31.7 trillion(FY 2010) about US$ 26.5 billion
- Agency executives: Jeong Jong-sub, Minister; Kim Seong-ryeol, Vice Minister; Lee Gyeong-og, 2nd Vice Minister
- Website: Official English Site

Korean name
- Hangul: 안전행정부
- Hanja: 安全行政部
- RR: Anjeon haengjeongbu
- MR: Anjŏn haengjŏngbu

Ministry of Security and Public Administration (MOSPA; Korean: 안전행정부), formerly Ministry of Public Administration and Security (MOPAS), was a ministry of the national government of South Korea. The ministry was in charge of the civil and domestic affairs in South Korea including the National Police Agency and the National Emergency Management Agency.

Its headquarters were in the Seoul Government Complex in Jongno District, Seoul.

In November 2014, the ministry was separated into Ministry of Government Administration and Home Affairs, Ministry of Public Safety and Security and Ministry of Personnel Management.

== Agencies ==
- National Police Agency
- National Emergency Management Agency

== Affiliated organizations ==
- Central Officials Training Institute
- Appeals Commission
- National Archives of Korea
- Administration Office of Government Complex
- National Computing and Information Agency
- The Committee for the Five Northern Korean Provinces
- National Forensic Service

== See also ==
- Web compatibility issues in South Korea
- Ministry of the Interior and Safety (South Korea)
