= Republic of Korea Civil Defense Corps =

Flag of the Republic Of Korea Civil Defense Corps

The Republic of Korea Civil Defense Corps (ROKCDC, Korean: 대한민국 민방위대; Hanja: 大韓民國 民防衛隊) is a civil defense organization in the Republic of Korea. As an organization under the jurisdiction of the Ministry of the Interior and Safety, men are legally compelled to participate in training along with military service obligations in the South Korea.

The total number of civil defense personnel reaches 3.62 million, and training is compulsory for 10 days per year, up to 50 hours of training (actually, 4 hours once a year for the 1st to 4th years, and 1 hour once a year for the rest of the year until the age of 40). In case of emergency, the Minister of Ministry of the Interior and Safety takes command.

As a mandatory military service after the reserve army, it is basically unpaid. However, if a member of the Civil Defense Corps dies in the course of performing his or her duties, appropriate compensation shall be paid. Women are not obligated to serve in the Civil Defense Corps, the military, or the duty and reserve forces.

Separately from the civil defence force, in accordance with the national defense obligation (as a citizen regardless of gender specified in the Constitution), not military service, a separate table 'Human Resources Management Occupation' in the 'Enforcement Rules of the Emergency Preparedness Resources Management Act' under the jurisdiction of the Ministry of the Interior and Safety' pursuant to the 'Emergency Resources Management Act', as 'human resources', license holders between the ages of 20 and 60 regardless of gender, Korean nationals engaged in related occupations, and 'material resources', related companies and materials are stipulates that it is necessary to establish a plan, manage resources, and educate and train in preparation for such situations so that the country's resources such as manpower and materials can be efficiently utilized. Training according to this is done within 7 days per year. According to the 'Enforcement Rules of the Emergency Preparedness Resources Management Act', training exemption includes civil defense corps training exemption and married women and people aged 56–60 regardless of gender.

== See also ==
- Republic of Korea Reserve Forces
- Republic of Korea Armed Forces
- Civil defense
- Ministry of the Interior and Safety (South Korea)
