= Emergency operations center =

Central command and control facility for incident management and preparedness

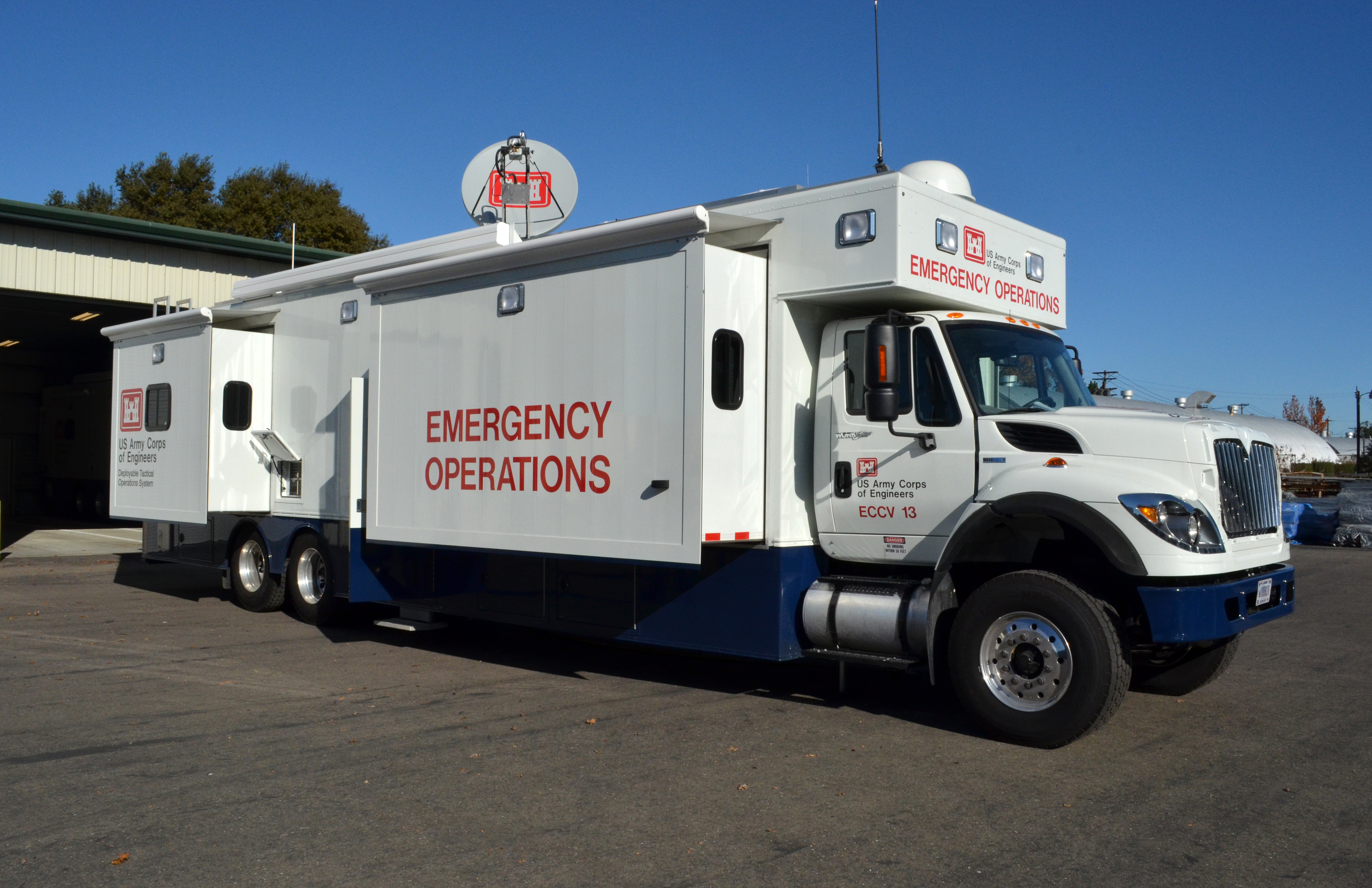
An emergency operations center operated by the United States Army Corps of Engineers

An emergency operations center (EOC) is a central command and control "coordination structure" responsible for managing emergency response, emergency preparedness, emergency management, and disaster management functions at a strategic level during an emergency. Based on the organizational needs of the entity that has implemented the EOC, as well as the emergency being dealt with, the specific responsibilities and tasks executed by a given EOC may vary vastly and could include ensuring the continued operation of a municipality, company, public or emergency service, or other organization.

EOCs were originally created as part of United States civil defense and can be found in many nations, at all government levels, as well as in larger corporations that deal with large equipment or numbers of employees. In corporations and smaller jurisdictions, the EOC may be co-located in the same room as an emergency communications center.

An EOC is responsible for strategic direction and operational decisions and does not normally directly control field assets, instead leaving tactical decisions to those in the field. The common functions of an EOC is to collect, gather and analyze data, make decisions that protect life and property, maintain continuity of an organization, and disseminate information to involved agencies and individuals.

When an EOC is operated in a vehicle such as a truck or trailer, or is otherwise capable of moving quickly (or being operated while moving), it is usually called a mobile command center (MCC), mobile command unit (MCU), or mobile forward control facility. These Mobile Command Centers serve as a central command hub to support tactical operations. They are outfitted with advanced communications and additional technology such as weather stations for monitoring situational awareness, improving safety and reporting.

== Structure ==
=== United States ===
In the United States, an emergency operations center established to deal with matters involving public safety will follow guidelines established by FEMA and ICS. The EOC will include personnel assigned to:

- An Operations Section "responsible for implementing tactical incident operations described in the IAP (incident action plan)."
- A Planning Section "responsible for collecting, evaluating, and disseminating operational information related to an incident [in order to] help prepare and document the IAP (incident action plan)."
- A Logistics Section "responsible for providing facilities, services and material support for an incident."
- A Finance / Administration Section "responsible for an incident’s administrative and financial considerations."

== See also ==
- Emergency management
- Incident Command System
- Federal Emergency Management Agency
- Mount Weather Emergency Operations Center
- Tactical operations center
- Office of emergency management
- Central Disaster and Safety Countermeasures Headquarters (South Korea)
