= Republic of Korea Reserve Forces =

Reserve force of the South Korean military

- 대한민국 예비군
- Flag
- Country: South Korea
- Allegiance: Citizens of South Korea (since 2011); Korean people (until April 2011)
- Nickname: "Yebigoon"
- March: "Song of the Reserve Forces" (예비군의 노래)

- Republic of Korea Reserve Forces
- Hangul: 대한민국 예비군
- Hanja: 大韓民國 豫備軍
- RR: Daehanminguk yebigun
- MR: Taehanmin'guk yebigun

The Republic of Korea Reserve Forces (ROKRF; Korean: 대한민국 예비군), also known as the ROK Reserve Forces, is the 3,100,000-strong reserve force of South Korea.

There are two major branches of the Reserve Forces: the Mobilization Reserve Forces (Korean: 동원예비군; Hanja: 動員豫備軍) and the Homeland Reserve Forces (향토예비군; 鄕土豫備軍), a Home Guard type force.

Soldiers who have completed their service in the Republic of Korea Armed Forces are automatically transferred to the Reserve Forces and must first serve 4 years in the Mobilization Reserve and then 4 years as an Homeland Reservist. During wartime, about 5 divisions would be formed under the Mobilization Reserves, and deployed to the war zone to provide support and regional stabilization. In the meantime, the Homeland Reserve would defend the homeland from any possible attacks from the enemy.

== History ==
The Homeland Reserve Force was established in April 1968 as part of a nationwide program to increase emergency defense capabilities in response to increased North Korean infiltration. In January 1968, a North Korean commando unit infiltrated Seoul and attacked the Blue House Presidential residence in an attempt to assassinate South Korean dictator Park Chung Hee.

That same month, two additional North Korean commando units launched attacks on towns on the Korean east coast in attempts to create an insurgency.

=== Civil defense ===
In 1980, there were over 90,000 civil defense personnel in the country. By 1990, there were more than 3.5 million civil defense personnel in reserve. Their missions included air raid defense, search and rescue missions, building and road repair.

Most of the units are now stationary since the threat of North Korean attacks are not increasingly present. However, some units still maintain active training duties, and can be spotted in military installations.

== Equipment ==
=== Small Arms ===
- Daewoo K2
- M16A1
- M1 Garand(out of service)
- M1 Carbine
- M1911
- Panzerfaust 3
- Daewoo Precision Industries K3
- M72 LAW
- M60 machine gun

=== Vehicles ===
- M113(Replaced by other armored vehicles)
- M48A3K
- K1 88-Tank
- Raycolt KLTV
- M35 series 2½-ton 6×6 cargo truck
- T-80(for pre-active personnel only)

== See also ==
- Reserve Military Training Units
- National Defense Corps incident
- Republic Of Korea Civil Defense Corps
