= Republic of Korea Armed Forces =

Combined military forces of South Korea

- 대한민국 국군 (Korean)
- Flag of the Republic of Korea Armed Forces
- Founded: 15 August 1948; 78 years ago
- Service branches: Republic of Korea Army; Republic of Korea Navy; Republic of Korea Marine Corps; Republic of Korea Air Force
- Headquarters: Ministry of National Defense, Yongsan District, Seoul

Leadership
- Commander-in-Chief: President Lee Jae Myung
- Minister of National Defense: Kang Shin-chul
- Chairman of the Joint Chiefs of Staff: General Jin Young Seung, ROKAF

Personnel
- Military age: 18
- Conscription: 18–28 years of age: 18 months (Army & Marines); 20 months (Navy); 21 months (Air Force)
- Active personnel: 450,000 (2025)
- Reserve personnel: 3,100,000 (2022) (ranked 2nd)
- Deployed personnel: 1,005 (2022)

Expenditure
- Budget: ₩65.9 trillion US$47.8 billion (2026) (ranked 11th)
- Percent of GDP: 2.37% (2026)

Industry
- Domestic suppliers: DI Optical; Farymann & TZEN; Hanwha Aerospace; Hanwha Ocean; Hanwha Systems; HD Hyundai Heavy Industries; HD Hyundai Infracore; HJ Shipbuilding & Construction; Hyundai Rotem; Hyundai WIA; Kia Corporation; Korea Aerospace Industries; Korean Air; LIG Defense & Aerospace; Poongsan Corporation; Samyang Chemical; Samyang Comtech; Satrec Initiative; SG Safety Corporation; SNT Dynamics; SNT Motiv
- Foreign suppliers: European Union; France; Germany; Spain; Italy; Netherlands; Israel; United Kingdom; United States

Related articles
- History: Korean War (1950–1953); Vietnam War (1965–1973); Persian Gulf War (1990–1991); War in Afghanistan (2001–2016); Iraq War (2003–2011)
- Ranks: Comparative military ranks of Korea; Military ranks of South Korea

The Republic of Korea Armed Forces (Korean: 대한민국 국군; Hanja: 大韓民國國軍; RR: Daehanminguk Gukgun; lit. 'Republic of Korea National Military'), also known as the ROK Armed Forces, are the armed forces of South Korea. The ROK Armed Forces is one of the largest and most powerful standing armed forces in the world with a reported personnel strength of 3,600,000 in 2022 (450,000 active and 3,100,000 reserve).

The Republic of Korea Armed Forces traces its roots back to the establishment of the Korean Republic in 1919 as the armed wing of the Korean government-in-exile and was called the Korean Liberation Army wherein it conducted warfare against the Japanese occupation by conducting large-scale offensives, assassinations, bombings, sabotage, and search and rescue missions. Formally founded in 1948, following the establishment of the South Korean government after the liberation of Korea in 1945, South Korea's military forces are responsible for maintaining the sovereignty and territorial integrity of the state and also engage in peacekeeping operations, humanitarian and disaster relief efforts worldwide.

Although under South Korean control during peacetime, in wartime they are placed under the command of the United States through the CFC.

== History ==
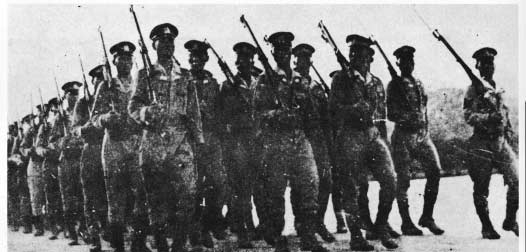
March of the Korean Constabulary, the parent of the Republic of Korea Armed Forces, on 15 January 1946

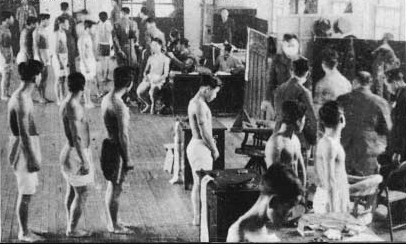
First conscription examination conducted on 16 December 1949 after founding of Republic of Korea

The origin of the Republic of Korea Armed Forces can be traced back to the Korean Independence Army, which was established by the Provisional Government of Korea in exile in Chongking, Republic of China in 1940 during the Japanese occupation of Korea. Many of its members became part of the South Korean armed forces later. In addition, some ethnic Korean Kuomintang and Manchukuo soldiers also contributed to the forces.

After Korea was liberated from the Empire of Japan on August 15, 1945, the Korean Constabulary (남조선국방경비대) and the Korean Coast Guard (조선해안경비대, organized by Sohn Won-yil and others) were established through the United States Army Military Government in Korea. The Korean Constabulary and the Korean Coast Guard became the Republic of Korea Army and Republic of Korea Navy respectively, and formed the Republic of Korea Armed Forces after the South Korean government was established on August 15, 1948. The Republic of Korea Air Force was founded in October 1949.

The South Korean armed forces remained largely constabulary forces until the outbreak of the Korean War on June 25, 1950, requiring the United Nations to intervene with United States-led forces. The South Korean military rapidly developed during the Korean War, despite suffering enormous casualties. As the Soviets had armed North Korea, the U.S. armed and trained the South Korean military throughout the Korean War. After the Korean War, South Korea established a joint military partnership with the United States, termed the ROK-U.S. Alliance, as outlined by the Mutual Defense Treaty. During the Vietnam War, the ROK Army and ROK Marines were among those fighting alongside South Vietnam and the United States.

In the 1970s, through the Park Chung Hee Administration's "Yulgok Plan" (율곡사업), South Korea began to build up self-reliant, national defense capability. The name derived from a scholar and an advisor to the king during the Joseon Dynasty. He had called out for an army of 10,000 men to keep the nation safe from any attacks. During South Korea's period of rapid growth in the 1980s, the military modernized, benefiting from several government-sponsored technology transfer projects and indigenous defense capability initiatives. In the 1990s, South Korean industries provided about 70 percent of the weapons, ammunition, communications and other types of equipment, vehicles, clothing, and other supplies needed by the military, and as of 2022, there are currently a total of 85 defense contractors in South Korea.

Today, the South Korean armed forces enjoy a mix of avant-garde as well as older conventional weapons. Its capabilities include many western weapon systems, complemented by a growing and increasingly more advanced indigenous defense manufacturing sector. For example, by taking advantage of the strong local shipbuilding industry, the ROK Navy has embarked on a rigorous modernization plan with ambitions to become a blue-water navy in the 2020s.

== Future ==
The ROK military forces are undergoing some preparation for assuming wartime operational control of the ROK's defenses. Several cutting-edge military systems are currently being inducted.

Based on the Moon Jae-in Administration's 'Defense Reform 2.0' (국방개혁 2.0) and in line with the overall troop drawdown scheme, the number of generals and admirals will be reduced by 17 percent from the current 436 to 360 by 2022 to reduce the bloated top command apparatus. This means the removal of 66 general-level positions for the Army and five each for the Navy and Air Force. At the same time, the ROK Armed Forces will see a reduction in active duty personnel from 640,000 to 517,000, and the length of compulsory military service will also be reduced to 18 – 22 months by 2022.

'Defense Reform 2.0' is also intended to make the ROK military more independent to prepare for the ROK military retaining operational control authority in wartime (OPCON transfer), rather than American general taking command. Initial operational control capability was verified in 2019, with full operational capability planned for 2021, and full mission capability planned for 2022.

== Defense strategy ==
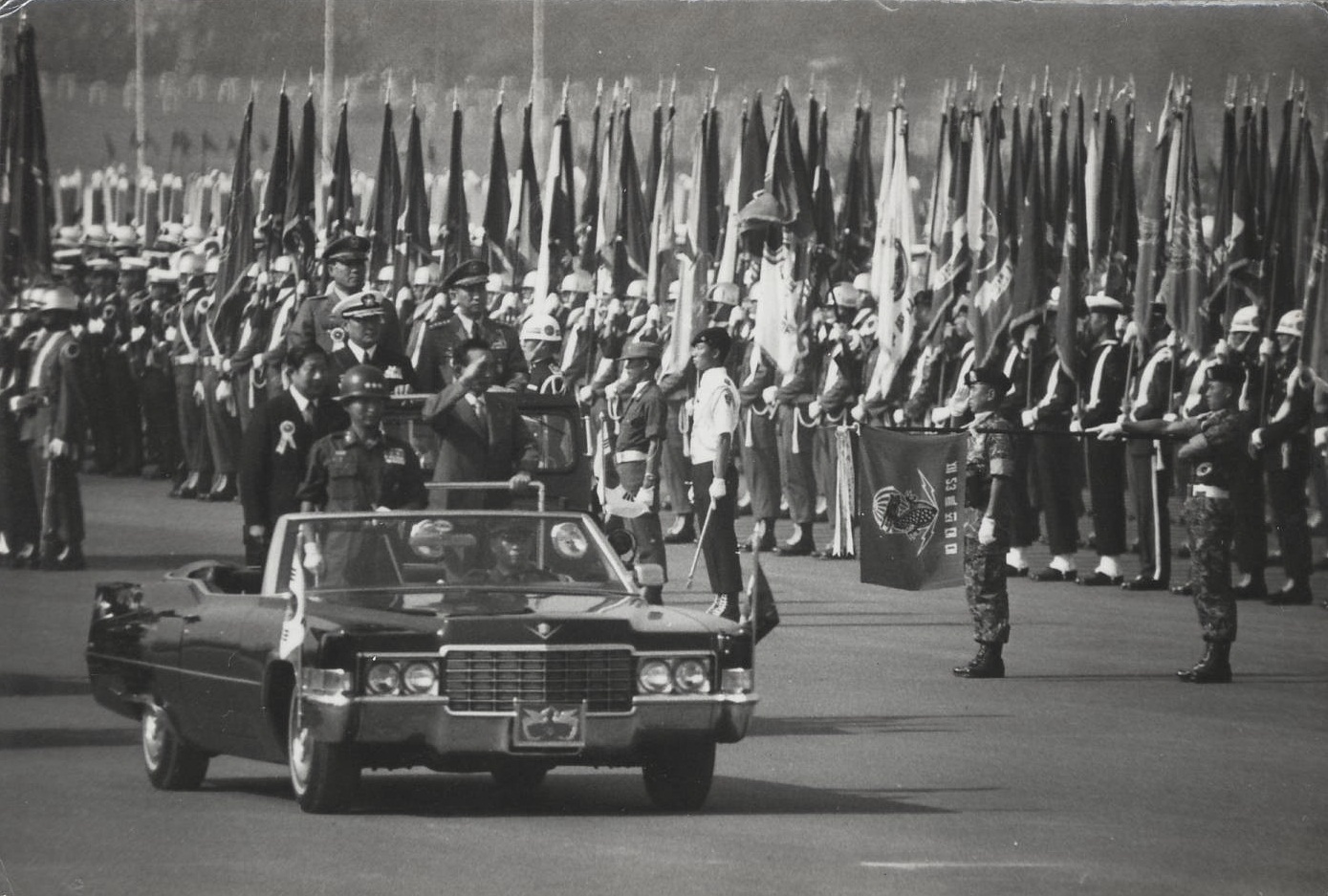
President Park Chung Hee inspecting troops at the 1973 Republic of Korea Armed Forces Day parade

The signing of the Korean Armistice Agreement in 1953 by the Republic of Korea (South Korea) and the Democratic People's Republic of Korea (North Korea), ended the active hostilities of the Korean War. Since an official peace treaty has not been signed by North and South Korea, defensive actions needed to be implemented by the Republic of Korea Army in case of another North Korean attack.

During the Cold War era, a variety of anti-tank barricades were constructed over roads and railroad tracks leading in and out of Seoul, as well as within the Gyeonggi Province. The anti-tank barricades or "rock drops" are made up of giant concrete blocks mounted on thin walls, made to look like fake bridges and overpasses, that lead to nowhere but house hundreds of tons of rubble. These structures are rigged with explosives and are designed to be blown up by the South Korean Army which would drop the rubble blocking roads and railways. Along with the anti-tank barricades, the South Korean Army placed barbed-wire fences along the Han River and hundreds of 3-foot tall concrete pillars arranged in rows, known as "dragon teeth", across open fields. During the 1970s and 1980s when most of these structures were built, the goal was to slow down enemy tanks, troops, and other vehicles and to buy time for South Korean civilians to flee from the invading North Korean forces, as well as to allow for the Republic of Korea and the United States Army to employ troops to defensive positions. The South Korean Ministry of National Defense claims that the anti-tank barricades are inspected regularly for safety concerns, but the barricades show cracks and signs of erosion.

Local governments and civilians are now demanding that the anti-tank barricades be removed as they pose a great safety risk, obstruct new development, and many people believe have outlived their purpose. There are about 250,000 vehicles a day that pass by the barricades and their vibrations contribute to weakening the structures. Despite safety concerns, tearing down barricades is a complicated matter.

Since North Korea lost security and economic support from Russia in 1990 and China in 1992, a full-ground force assault on South Korea is unlikely according to military analysts. North Korea has changed its military tactics and now focuses on long-range and covert strikes. Through long-range artillery barrages, missile strikes, or chemical weapons that are used to deliberately attack non-American targets and short of all-out war, the North could seek to hold Seoul hostage with the hope of renegotiating a new status quo. Special warfare units are expected to use wartime tunnels or various infiltration means such as submarines, air-cushion vehicles (ACVs), AN-2 aircraft, and helicopters to infiltrate the forward and rear areas and conduct hybrid operations in the form of striking major units and facilities, assassinating key figures, and disturbing the rear area. The Defense Reform Base Plan was originally presented by President Roh Moo-hyun in December 2006, but after years of evolution, and political and military pushback the reform was launched by President Moon Jae-in's administration. The ROK Armed Forces will firmly implement Defense Reform 2.0 to proactively respond to changes in the security environment and omnidirectional security threats, as well as support peace and prosperity on the Korean Peninsula based on strength. To this end, the ROK Armed Forces will work toward "steadfast national defense.

On 27 December 2022 North Korea sent five drones over the border, one reaching Seoul. All five returned to the North, despite a five hour chase involving fighter jets and attack helicopters, with some 100 rounds being fired. A KAI KT-1 Woongbi crashed although both crew survived. The Joint Chiefs of Staff released a statement in which it acknowledges it can stop attack drones. However, its ability to stop smaller spy drones is "limited". A senior official, Kang Shin-chul, said: "Our military's lack of preparedness has caused a lot of concern to the people...actively employ detection devices to spot the enemy's drone from an early stage and aggressively deploy strike assets". The South Korean President Yoon Suk-yeol has indicated that South Korea will invest in stealthy drones that could penetrate North Korea with the creation of a new military unit.

The South Korean Defence Ministry announced a new series of anti-drone measures, spending some 560 billion won over the next five years. The money will go towards four new initiatives. One is an airborne laser that will be used to destroy larger drones whilst a jammer would be used on smaller drones. A new counter drone unit, made up of two squadrons, would also be created. The laser is already in the test process and is expected to become operational in 2027. The jamming system has been described as "soft kill". Further work will be done on stealth jets and anti-rocket artillery systems. The total amount of the spending over the next five years is 331.4 trillion. The previous Defence budget for the last financial year was just 54.6 trillion won as a comparison.

== Command structure ==
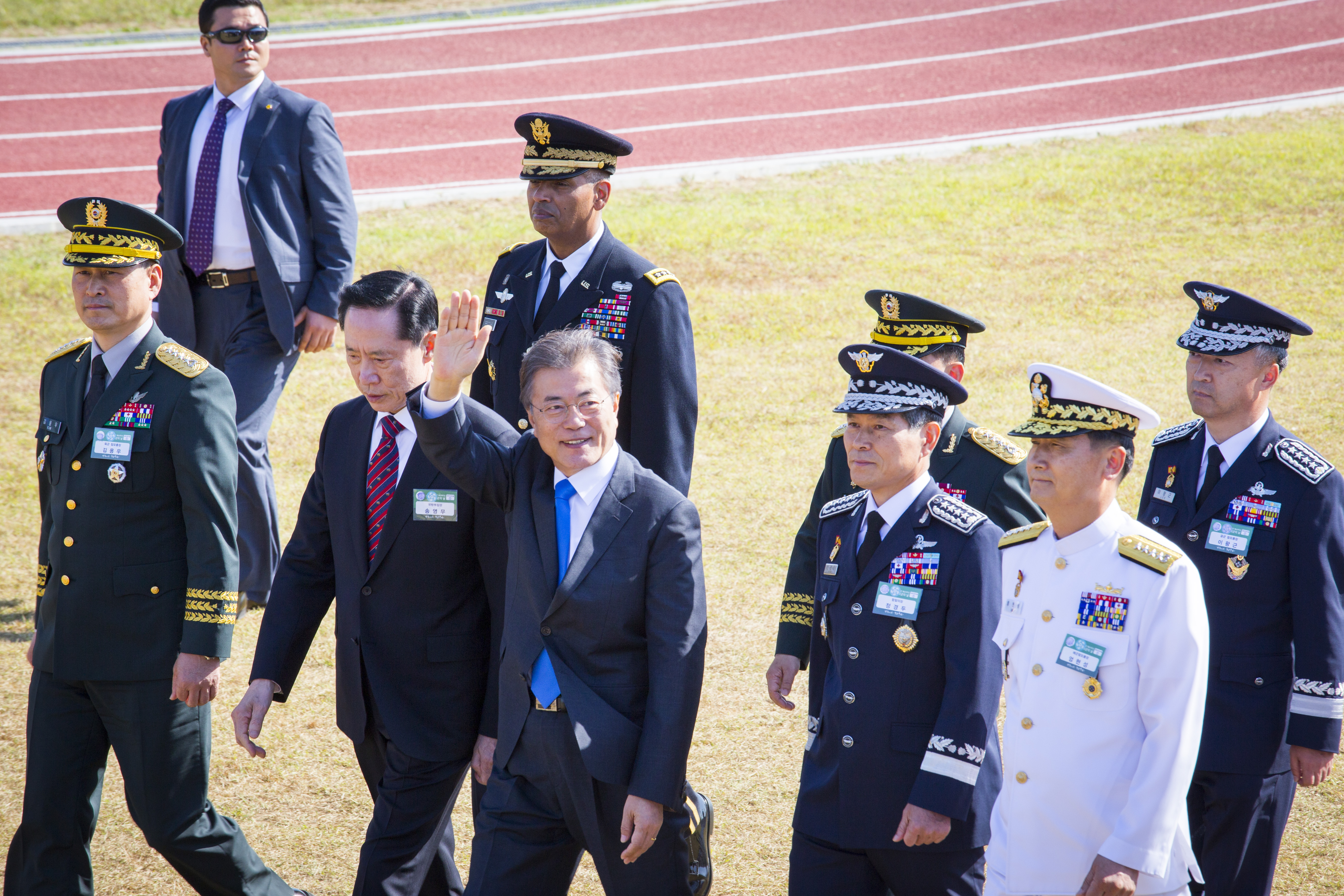
President Moon Jae-in with the Minister of National Defense, the Joint Chiefs of Staff, and the Commander of USFK in 2017

Command over the ROK Armed Forces is established in the Constitution. The President is the Commander-in-Chief Forces ex officio. The military authority runs from the President to the Minister of National Defense, who is often to be (but not legally bound to be) a retired four-star general. The President and Minister of National Defense are in charge of the entire military establishment, maintaining civilian control of the military. The Minister of National Defense, by order of the President, takes charge of military affairs, and supervises the Chairman of the Joint Chiefs of Staff and the chief of staff of each service of the Armed Forces.

To coordinate military strategy with political affairs, the President has a National Security Council headed by the National Security Advisor.

=== Joint Chiefs of Staff ===
The Joint Chiefs of Staff consists of the Chairman of the Joint Chiefs of Staff, and the military service chiefs from the Army, Navy, and Air Force. Unlike the U.S. counterpart, operational command of combat units falls within the purview of the Chairman of the Joint Chiefs of Staff who reports to the Minister of National Defense.

The Chairman of the Joint Chiefs of Staff, a four-star general or admiral, is the senior officer of the Armed Forces. The Chairman of the Joint Chiefs of Staff assists the Minister of National Defense with regard to operational command authority, and supervises the combat units of each service of the Armed Forces, by order of the Minister of National Defense. The chain of operational control runs straight from the Chairman of the Joint Chiefs of Staff to the commandants of the Army, Navy, and Air Force operational commands. The respective chiefs of staff of each service branch (Army, Navy, and Air Force) has administrative control over his or her own service.

== Service branches ==
The ROK Armed Forces consists of the ROK Army, ROK Navy, and ROK Air Force. The ROK Marine Corps functions as a branch of the Navy. The ROK Reserve Forces is a reserve component.

=== ROK Army ===
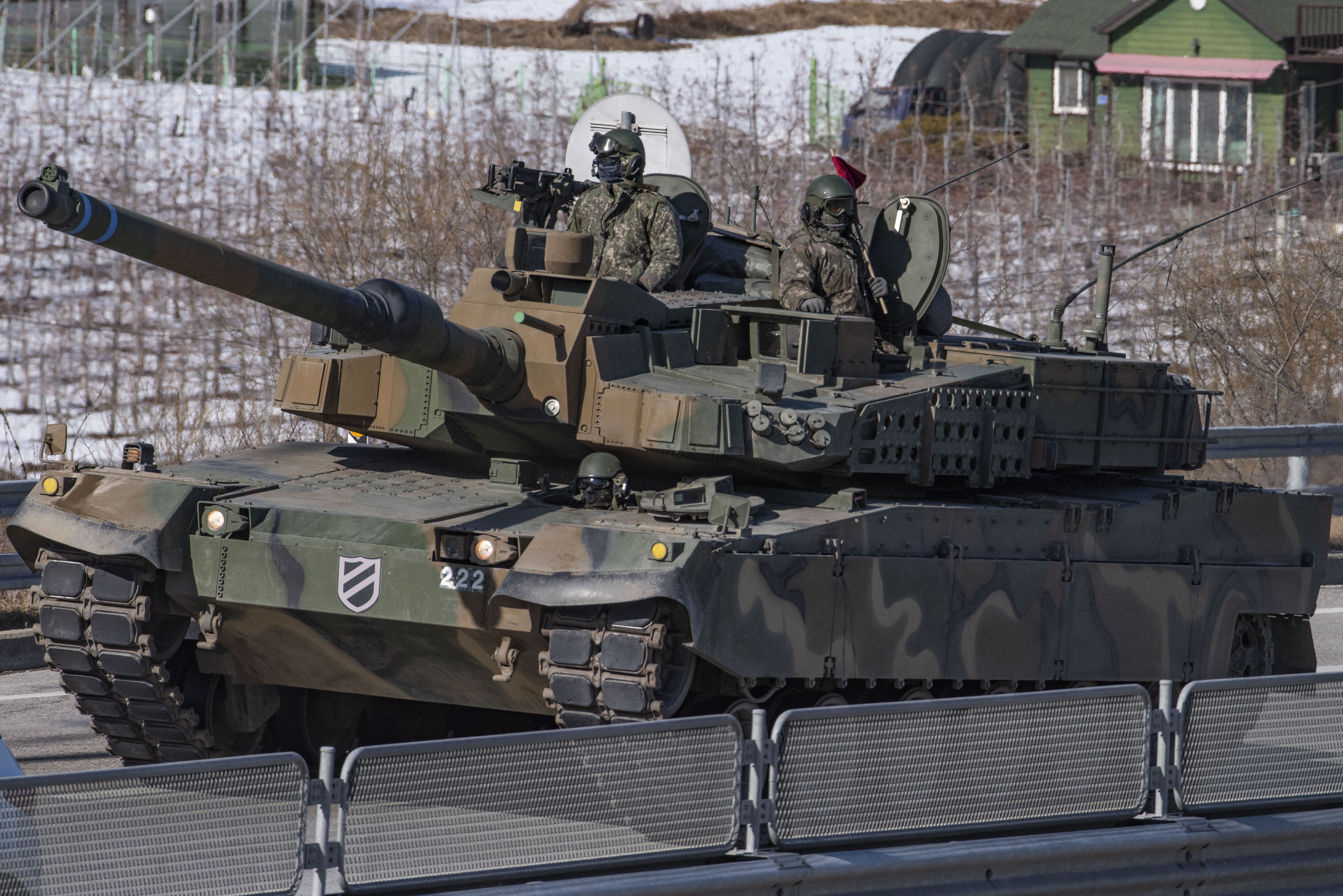
ROK Army K2 Black Panther main battle tank

The ROK Army (ROKA) is by far the largest of the military branches, with about 420,000 personnel as of 2020. This comes as a response to both the mountainous terrain native to the Korean Peninsula (70% mountainous) as well as the heavy North Korean presence, with its 1-million-strong army, two-thirds of which is permanently garrisoned in the frontline near the DMZ. The current administration has initiated a program of self-defense, whereby South Korea would be able to fully counter the North Korean threat with purely domestic means by about 2030.

The ROK Army was formerly organized into three armies: the First Army (FROKA), Third Army (TROKA) and Second Operational Command each with its own headquarters, corps (not Second Operational Command), and divisions. The Third Army was responsible for the defense of the capital as well as the western section of the DMZ. The First Army was responsible for the defense of the eastern section of the DMZ whereas the Second Operational Command formed the rearguard.

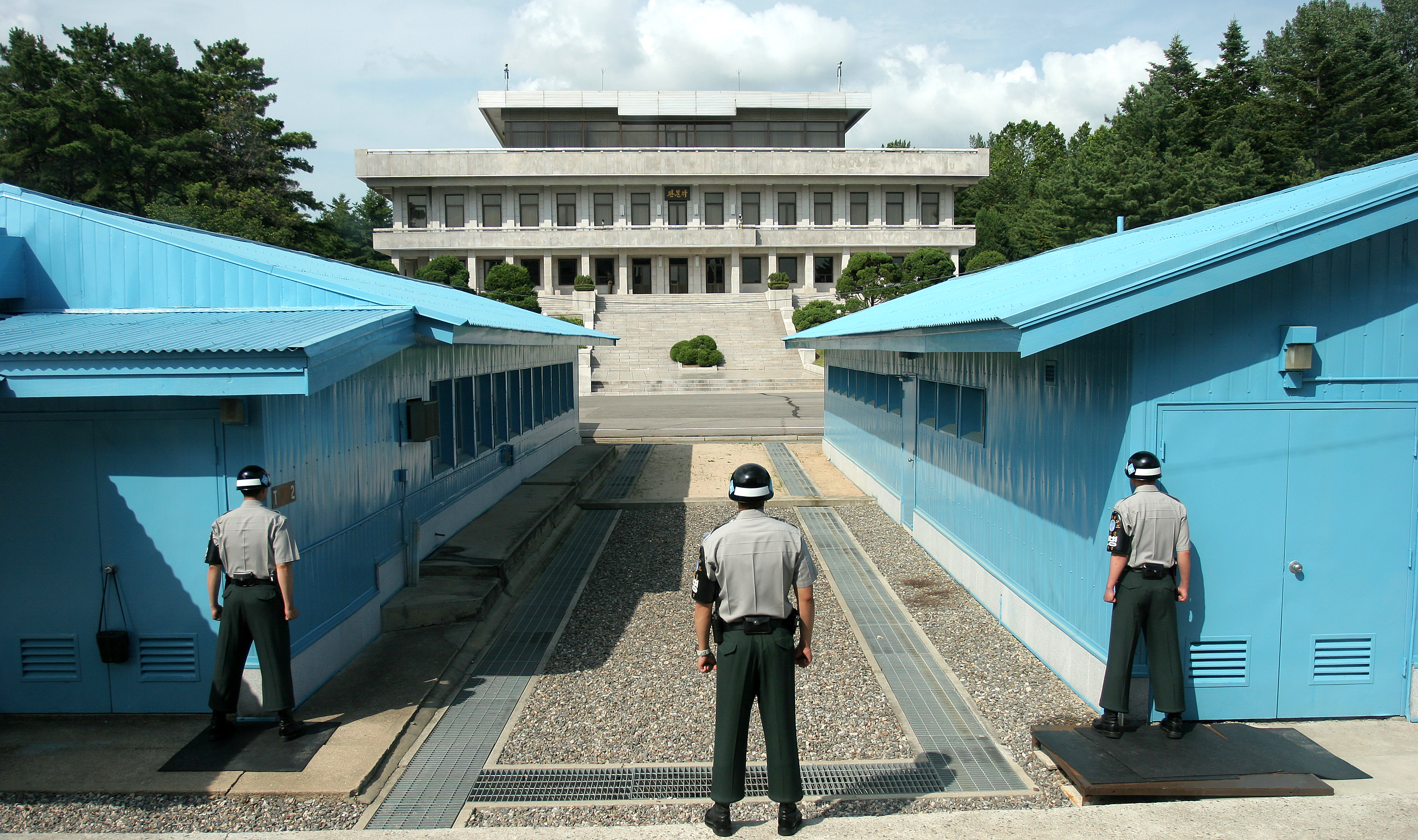
South Korean soldiers at the Joint Security Area (JSA) between the blue buildings, with North Korea in the background

Under a restructuring plan aimed at reducing redundancy, the First and Third Armies will be incorporated into the newly formed First Operations Command, whereas the Second ROK Army has been converted into the Second Operational Command. The army consists of the Army Headquarters, the Aviation Command, and the Special Warfare Command, with 9 corps, 36 divisions, some 464,000 troops and estimated as many as 5,850 tanks and armored vehicles, 11,337 artillery systems, 7,032 missile defense systems and 13,000 infantry support systems.

The army will take the brunt of the personnel reduction part of the Defense Reform 307. Associated with this personnel reduction would be a significant reduction in the ROK Army force structure, in particular decreasing the current force of 47 divisions (active duty and reserve) down to a force of about 28 divisions.

=== ROK Navy ===
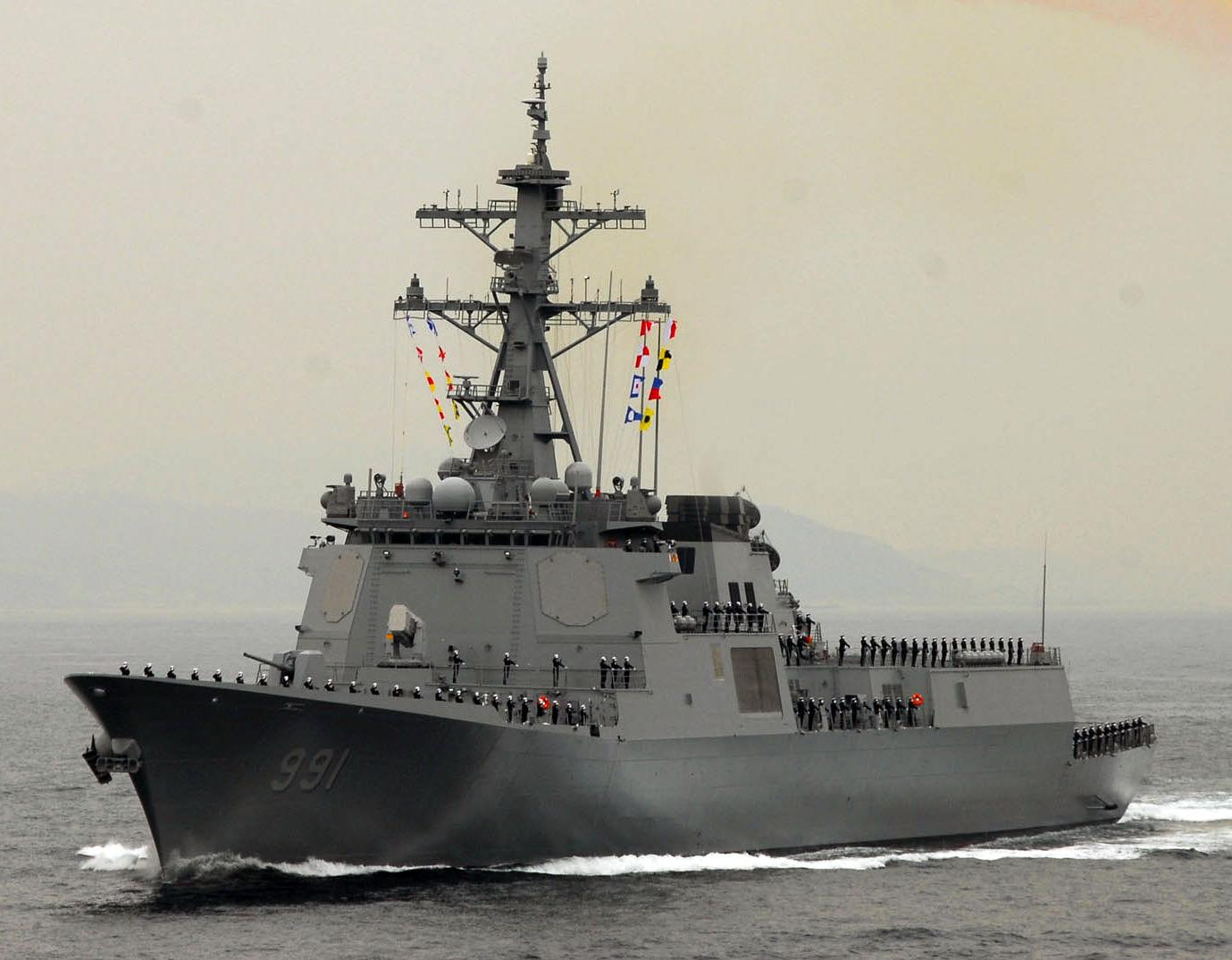
ROK Navy ROKS Sejong the Great (DDG 991), a Sejong the Great-class guided-missile destroyer

The ROK Navy (ROKN) is responsible for naval and amphibious operations. The ROK Navy has about 70,000 regular personnel including 29,000 Republic of Korea Marines. There are about 150 commissioned ships with the ROK Navy (a total displacement of about 215,000 tonnes). The naval aviation force consists of about 70 fixed-wing and rotary-wing aircraft.

The Republic of Korea Navy includes the Republic of Korea Navy Headquarters, Republic of Korea Fleet, and Republic of Korea Marine Corps. The Chief of Naval Operations (CNO) is the highest-ranking officer of the ROK Navy, and oversees the administration of organizing, recruiting, training, equipping, supplying, and mobilizing the ROK Navy. The Republic of Korea Fleet is the highest operational command of the ROK Navy.

Since the 1990s, the ROK Navy has been trying to build an ocean-going fleet to protect the sea lines of communication. During Admiral An Pyong-tae's tenure as CNO, President Kim Young-sam supported the Navy by approving a long-term shipbuilding plan for the ocean-going navy. In the first decade of the 21st century, the ROK Navy launched the lead ships of larger and better equipped warships with local shipbuilders: In 2002, ROKS Chungmugong Yi Sunshin (DDH 975), a 4,500-ton destroyer, was launched; in 2005, the 14,000-ton amphibious warfare ship, ROKS Dokdo (LPH 6111) was launched; in 2006, the ROK Navy launched ROKS Sohn Wonyil (SS 072), an 1,800-ton Type 214 submarine with Air-Independent propulsion (AIP) system. In 2007, the ROK Navy launched the lead ship (DDG 991) of Sejong the Great-class destroyers with the Aegis Combat System.

The ROK Navy completed a new naval base called Jeju Civilian-Military Complex Port in 2016 on the southern coast of Jeju Island to protect the sea lines of communication. In order to support ocean-going operations, the ROK Navy commissioned the 10,000-ton logistics support ship, ROKS Soyang (AOE 51), and launched the first locally designed 3,000-ton submarine, Dosan Ahn Changho (SS 083) in 2018. The ROK Navy continues to upgrade ongoing shipbuilding programs such as the Korean Submarine (KSS), Korean Destroyer Experimental (KDX), Frigate Experimental (FFX), and Landing Transport Experimental (LPX).

The ROK Navy aims to become a blue-water navy in the 2020s.

==== ROK Marine Corps ====
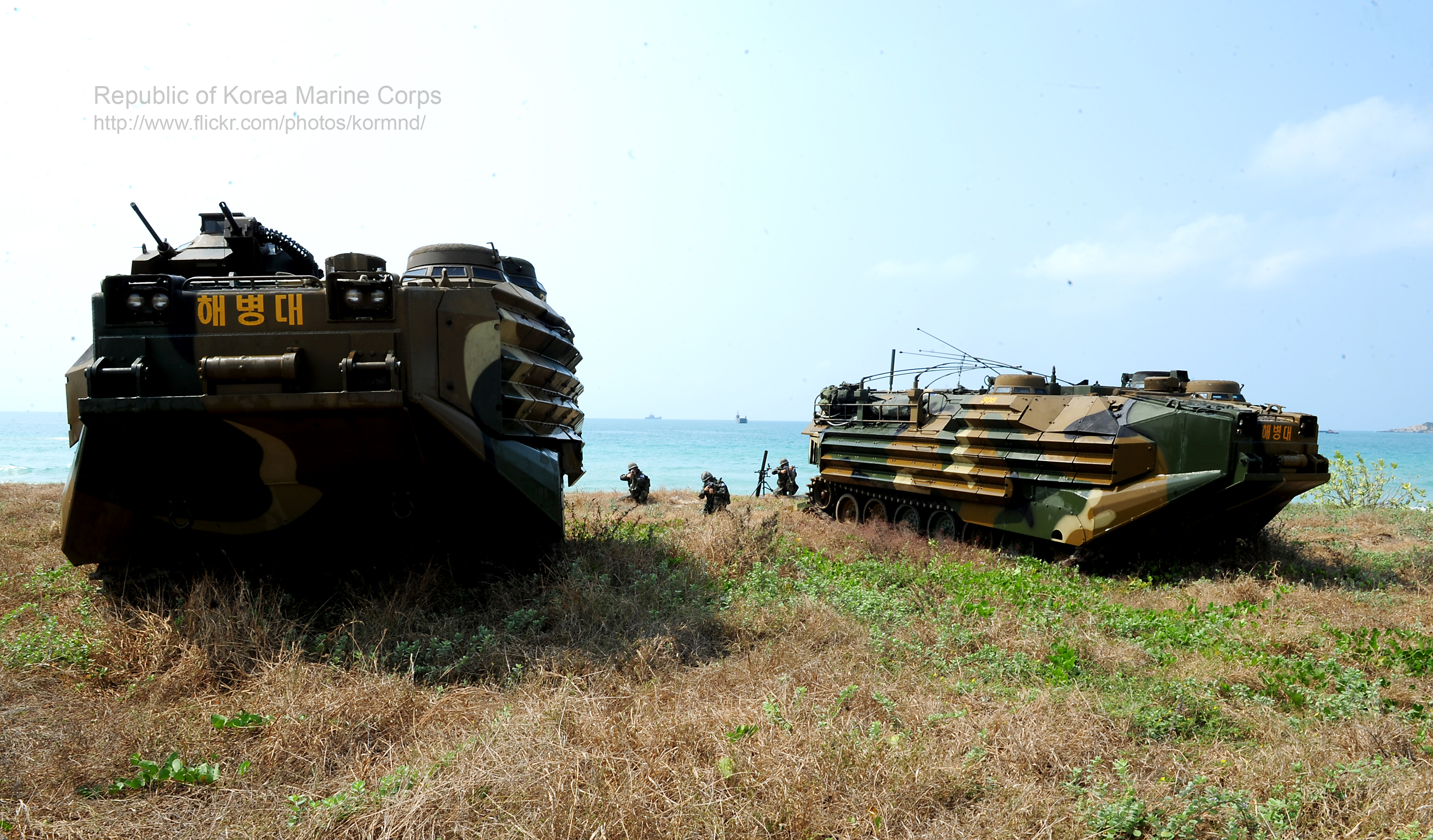
ROKMC KAAV7A1 assault amphibious vehicles

The ROK Marine Corps (ROKMC) is a branch of the Republic of Korea Navy responsible for amphibious operations, and also functions as a rapid reaction force and a strategic reserve. The ROK Marine Corps, with 29,000 personnel, is organized into two divisions and two brigades. The ROK Marine Corps has about 300 tracked vehicles including assault amphibious vehicles, main battle tanks, and self-propelled artillery.

The Commandant of the Republic of Korea Marine Corps is a three-star general. Following the bombardment of Yeonpyeong Island in 2010 and the subsequent establishment of the Northwest Islands Defense Command (NWIDC), the Commandant of the ROKMC has been dual-hatted as the Commander NWIDC.

=== ROK Air Force ===
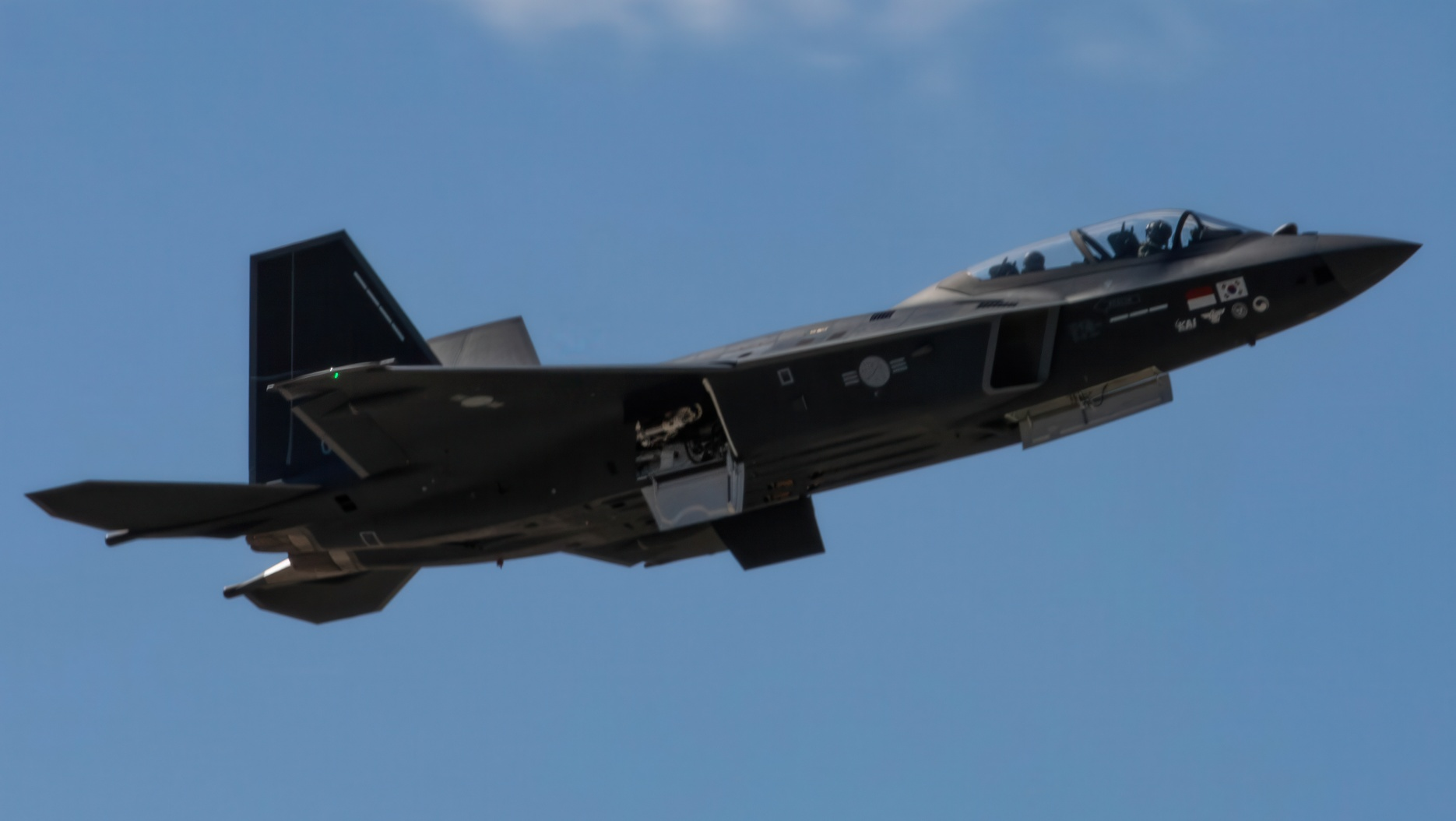
ROK Air Force KF-21 Boramae multirole combat aircraft

The ROK Air Force (ROKAF) maintains a modern air and space force in order to defend itself from various modes of threats, including the North Korean Army. The ROK Air Force fields some 450 combat aircraft of American design. In contrast, the North Korean Army has roughly 650 combat aircraft, but mostly obsolete types of Soviet and Chinese origin.

Korea began a program for the development of indigenous jet trainers beginning in 1997. This project eventually culminated in the KAI T-50, dubbed the "Golden Eagle" which is used as a trainer for jet pilots, now being exported to Indonesia. A multirole all-weather version of the T-50 is the modified FA-50, which can be externally fitted with Rafael's Sky Shield or LIG Nex1's ALQ-200K ECM pods, Sniper or LITENING targeting pods, and Condor 2 reconnaissance pods to further improve the fighter's electronic warfare, reconnaissance, and targeting capabilities. Other improved weapon systems over FA-50 include SPICE multifunctional guidance kits, Textron CBU-97/105 Sensor Fuzed Weapon with WCMD tail kits, JDAM, and JDAM-ER for more comprehensive air-to-ground operations, and AIM-120 missiles for BVR air-to-air operations. FA-50 has provisions for, but does not yet integrate, Python and Derby missiles, also produced by Rafael, and other anti-ship missiles, stand-off weapons, and sensors to be domestically developed by Korea.

The Republic of Korea Air Force also expressed interests in acquiring the RQ-4 Global Hawk and Joint Direct Attack Munition kits to further improve their intelligence and offensive capabilities.

The replacement programs for the F-4D/E and F-5A/B/E/F are the KTX-2 and F-X, respectively. The latter has been fulfilled by the Boeing F-15K.

The South Korean government also announced its plan to develop domestic helicopter manufacturing to replace the aging UH-1 helicopters, many of which had seen service during the Vietnam War. The program originally included plans to develop both a civilian and a military helicopter. This was later revised and gave priority to the utility helicopter program. Based on the success and experience of the civilian KMH (Korean Multi-purpose Helicopter), an attack helicopter with a shared configuration is planned to be developed.

== Personnel ==
Conscription in South Korea requires male citizens between the age of 18 and 28 to perform compulsory military service. Women are not required to perform military service, but they may volunteer as officers, warrant officers, or non-commissioned officers.

The length of compulsory military service varies based on service branches: Active duty enlisted personnel serve 18 months in the Army or Marine Corps, 20 months in the Navy, and 21 months in the Air Force (the length of military service will be reduced to 18 – 22 months by 2022.). Commissioned officers, warrant officers, and non-commissioned officers are volunteer-based, and serve longer terms than those of enlisted personnel, or as career. Non-active duty personnel such as social work personnel serve for various lengths. After conscripts finish their military service, they are automatically placed on the reserve roster.

=== Ranks ===
In the South Korean armed forces, ranks fall into one of four categories: commissioned officer, warrant officer, non-commissioned officer, and junior enlisted ("Byeong"), in decreasing order of authority. Commissioned officer ranks are subdivided into "Jangseong"-level (general) officers, "Yeonggwan"-level (field-grade) officers, and "Wigwan"-level (company-grade) officers. All three branches of the South Korean Armed Forces share the same rank insignia and titles in Korean (The English titles are given as comparative examples with the US Army ranks.).

ROK Navy commissioned officer ranks have two distinct sets of rank insignia: On dress uniform, a series of stripes similar to Commonwealth naval ranks are worn; on service uniforms, working uniforms, and special uniform situations (combat utilities and flight suits), the rank insignia are the same as the equivalent rank in the Army or the Air Force.

==== Commissioned officer ranks ====
Rank group	General/flag officers					Field/senior officers			Junior officers
Armed Forces
Rank title	원수; Wonsu	대장; Daejang	중장; Jungjang	소장; Sojang	준장; Junjang	대령; Daeryeong	중령; Jungnyeong	소령; Soryeong	대위; Daewi	중위; Jungwi	소위; Sowi

==== Warrant officer ranks ====
Rank group	Warrant officer
Armed Forces
Armed Forces	준위; Junwi

==== Other ranks ====
Rank group	Non-commissioned officer				Enlisted
Armed Forces
Rank title	원사; Wonsa	상사; Sangsa	중사; Jungsa	하사; Hasa	병장; Byeongjang	상등병; Sangdeungbyeong	일등병; Ildeungbyeong	이등병; Ideungbyeong

== Budget ==
South Korea has one of the highest defense budgets in the world, ranking 9th globally in 2021, with a budget of nearly $46.7 billion U.S. dollars, and the defense budget trends from 1975 to 2026 based on South Korea's 2020 GDP announced by the Ministry of National Defense are as follows, and the actual annual military expenditure may be higher because the amount of the executive budget does not include the supplementary budget.

Year	Amount (KRW)	% of GDP (2020)	% of Gov Budget	% of change
1975	458.8 billion	4.28	28.9	57.7
1976	732.7 billion	4.98	32.4	59.7
1977	962.6 billion	5.09	33.5	31.4
1978	1.22 trillion	4.78	34.8	27.0
1979	1.53 trillion	4.66	29.5	25.7
1980	2.24 trillion	5.56	34.7	46.2
1981	2.69 trillion	5.33	33.6	20.1
1982	3.12 trillion	5.34	33.5	15.7
1983	3.27 trillion	4.71	31.4	4.9
1984	3.30 trillion	4.11	29.6	1.0
1985	3.68 trillion	4.09	29.4	11.6
1986	4.15 trillion	3.93	30.1	12.7
1987	4.74 trillion	3.79	29.6	14.1
1988	5.52 trillion	3.67	30.0	16.3
1989	6.01 trillion	3.52	27.3	9.0
1990	6.63 trillion	3.21	24.2	10.4
1991	7.45 trillion	2.98	27.4	12.3
1992	8.41 trillion	2.94	25.1	12.8
1993	9.21 trillion	2.83	24.2	9.6
1994	10.07 trillion	2.62	23.3	9.3
1995	11.07 trillion	2.45	21.3	9.9
1996	12.24 trillion	2.41	21.1	10.6
1997	13.78 trillion	2.46	20.4	12.6
1998	14.62 trillion	2.63	20.8	6.1
1999	13.74 trillion	2.24	17.2	−6.0 (Note: Defense budget cuts due to the 1997 Asian financial crisis)
2000	14.43 trillion	2.14	16.7	5.0
2001	15.38 trillion	2.10	16.3	6.6
2002	16.36 trillion	2.01	15.5	6.3
2003	17.42 trillion	2.01	15.6	6.5
2004	18.94 trillion	2.01	16.0	8.7
2005	20.82 trillion	2.09	15.5	9.9
2006	22.51 trillion	2.15	15.5	8.1
2007	24.49 trillion	2.16	15.7	8.8
2008	26.64 trillion	2.22	15.2	8.8
2009	28.53 trillion	2.27	14.5	7.1
2010	29.56 trillion	2.14	14.7	3.6
2011	31.40 trillion	2.17	15.0	6.2
2012	32.95 trillion	2.19	14.8	5.0
2013	34.34 trillion	2.19	14.5	4.2
2014	35.70 trillion	2.18	14.4	4.0
2015	37.45 trillion	2.15	14.5	4.9
2016	38.79 trillion	2.12	14.5	3.6
2017	40.33 trillion	2.09	14.7	4.0
2018	43.15 trillion	2.15	14.3	7.0
2019	46.69 trillion	2.29	14.1	8.2
2020	50.15 trillion	2.44	14.1	7.4
2021	52.84 trillion	2.38	13.9	5.4
2022	54.61 trillion	2.35	13.0	3.4
2023	57.01 trillion	2.37	12.8	4.4
2024	59.42 trillion	2.34	13.2	4.2
2025	61.24 trillion	2.32	12.9	3.1
2026	65.90 trillion	2.37	13.0	7.5

== Overseas deployments ==
As part of its mission, the ROK Armed Forces have engaged in peacekeeping operations, humanitarian, and disaster-relief efforts worldwide. In 2008, officers and soldiers of Unit Dongmyeong, stationed in Lebanon with the UNIFIL, received honorary medals from the United Nations.

Name of Conflict/PKO	Location	Date		Deployed		Casualty				Notes
Name of Conflict/PKO	Location	Started	Ended	Current	Total	Dead	Wounded	Missing	Captured	Notes
Vietnam War	South Vietnam	1964-09-01	1973-03-23		325,517	5,099	10,962	4	0	
Persian Gulf War	Saudi Arabia; United Arab Emirates	1991-01-24	1991-04-10		314	0	0	0	0	
UNOSOM II	Somalia	1993-07-30	1994-03-18		516	0	0	0	0	
MINURSO	Western Sahara	1994-08-09	2006-05-15		542	0	0	0	0	
UNOMIG	Georgia	1994-10-06	2009-07-10		88	1	0	0	0	
UNAVEM III	Angola	1995-10-05	1996-12-23		600	0	0	0	0	
UNMOGIP	India; Pakistan	1997-03-03	ongoing	7	165	1	0	0	0	
UNAMET	Timor-Leste	1999-10-04	2004-06-04		3,328	5	0	0	0	
Cooperation	United States	2001-11-16	ongoing	3	44	0	0	0	0	
OEF – Afghanistan	Afghanistan	2001-12-18	2014-06-23		5,082	2	1	0	0	
UNFICYP	Cyprus	2002-01-04	2003-12-23		1	0	0	0	0	
Iraq War	Iraq	2003-02-12	2008-12-30		20,308	1	0	0	0	
CJTF-HOA	Djibouti	2003-03	2012-12		15	0	0	0	0	
UNMIL	Liberia	2003-10-18	2018-03-30	2	20	0	0	0	0	
ONUB	Burundi	2004-09-15	2006-12-11		4	0	0	0	0	
UNMIS	Sudan	2005-11-25	2011-07		46	0	0	0	0	
UNIFIL	Lebanon	2007-01-16	ongoing	316	4,229	0	0	0	0	
UNMIN	Nepal	2007-03-12	2011-01-15		13	1	0	0	0	
OEF – Horn of Africa	Somalia	2008-01-16	ongoing	303	3,700	0	3	0	0	
UNAMID	Sudan	2009-06-16	ongoing	2	8	0	0	0	0	
MINURSO	Western Sahara	2009-07-27	ongoing	4	12	0	0	0	0	
UNOCI	Ivory Coast	2009-07-28	ongoing	2	8	0	0	0	0	
MINUSTAH	Haiti	2010-02-17	2012-12-24		1,433	0	0	0	0	
Cooperation	United Arab Emirates	2011-01-11	ongoing	144	687	0	1	0	0	
UNMISS	South Sudan	2013-03-01	ongoing	293	293	0	0	0	0	
Araw Contingent	Philippines	2013-12-09	2014-12-22		540	0	0	0	0	

== See also ==
- Defense industry of South Korea
- Command Post Tango
- KATUSA (Korean Augmentation to U.S. Army)
- United States Forces Korea (USFK)
- Order of Military Merit (Korea)
- Korean Liberation Army
- South Korea in the Vietnam War
- Korean People's Army
- Republic of Korea Reserve Forces
- Republic Of Korea Civil Defense Corps
- Hazing in the Republic of Korea Armed Forces
