= Ministry of Public Safety and Security (South Korea) =

2014–2017 South Korean government agency

- 국민안전처
- Emblem of the Ministry of Public Safety and Security

Agency overview
- Formed: November 19, 2014
- Preceding agencies: Ministry of Safety and Public Administration; Korea Coast Guard; National Emergency Management Agency
- Dissolved: July 25, 2017
- Superseding agency: Ministry of the Interior and Safety
- Jurisdiction: Government of South Korea
- Headquarters: Ministry of Public Safety and Security Sejong Special Autonomous City, Republic of Korea

Korean name
- Hangul: 국민안전처
- Hanja: 國民安全處
- RR: Gungmin anjeoncheo
- MR: Kungmin anjŏnch'ŏ

The Ministry of Public Safety and Security (MPSS; Korean: 국민안전처) was an organization of the national government of South Korea with the responsibility of public safety and security. It was established on November 19, 2014, with a merger of the National Emergency Management Agency, Korea Coast Guard, a branch of Safety of Ministry of Security and Public Administration to prevent and efficiently respond to national disasters. It has its headquarters in the Seoul Government Complex.

== History ==
- 1948. 11. 14 : Established the Fire Bureau in the Ministry of Home Affairs.
- 1953. 12. 14 : Established the Korean Maritime Police Force in the Security Division of the Public Safety Bureau in the Ministry of Home Affairs.
- 1955. 02. 07 : Reorganized into the Marine Guards in the Maritime Business Agency of the Ministry of Commerce and Industry.
- 1962. 05. 05 : Reorganized into the Korean Maritime Police Force in the Ministry of Home Affairs.
- 1975. 08. 26 : Established the Headquarters of Civil Defense and the Fire Bureau in the Ministry of Home Affairs.
- 1991. 04. 23 : Established the Civil Defense Headquarters and the Fire Bureau within the Ministry of Home Affairs.
- 1991. 08. 01 : Inaugurated the Korea Coast Guard in the National Police Agency.
- 1996. 08. 08 : Reorganized the Korea Coast Guard under the Ministry of Oceans and Fisheries.
- 1998. 07. 22 : Reorganized into the Headquarters of Civil Defense and Disaster Management in the Ministry of Government Administration and Home Affairs.
- 2004. 06. 01 : Established the National Emergency Management Agency under the Ministry of Government Administration and Home Affairs.
- 2008. 02. 29 : Reorganized the Korea Coast Guard under the Ministry of Land, Transportation and Maritime Affairs.
- 2013. 03. 23 : Expanded and reorganized into the Safety Management Headquarters in the Ministry of Security and Public Administration.
- 2014. 11. 07 : The revised bill for the National Government Organization Act (concerning the establishment of the Ministry of Public Safety and Security) passed by the National Assembly.
- 2014. 11. 19 : Established the Ministry of Public Safety and Security.

== Important Roles ==
- Innovating safety
1. Safety Industry, Technology
2. Civil Defense, Elevator Safety
3. Fire Suppression · Rescue and Emergency Medical Services
4. Maritime Search and Rescue Operations
5. Special Disaster Response
6. Maritime Security
7. Marine Pollution Response
8. Control Natural Disasters and Societal Disasters
9. Disaster reduction, Climate change, Earthquake prevention
10. National Disaster and Safety Control Center

== See also ==
- Government of South Korea
- Ministry of Security and Public Administration
- United States Department of Homeland Security - similar organization in the U.S.
- Ministry of the Interior and Safety (South Korea)
- Fire services in South Korea
