= National Fire Agency (South Korea) =

South Korean government agency

- 소방청

Operational area
- Country: South Korea
- Address: Government Complex Sejong II, 13, Jeongbu 2cheongsa-ro, Sejong City

Agency overview
- Established: 2017/07/26
- Employees: 830
- Commissioner: Heo Seok-gon

Website
- www.nfa.go.kr

The National Fire Agency (NFA; Korean: 소방청; Hanja: 消防廳) is the central administrative agency of South Korea that administers firefighting affairs. The NFA was created on June 27, 2017 by an Amendment to the Government Organization Act. It is under the jurisdiction of the Ministry of the Interior and Safety.

The NFA's primary purpose is to comprehensively respond to any accidents or disasters in the country. It has tightened the national disaster response system by supplementing the existing firefighting workforce and equipment and strengthening the teams working primarily on site.

The current Commissioner is Kim Seung-ryong, in office since 2025.

== See also ==
- Fire services in South Korea
