= Local Government Officials Development Institute =

South Korean local government training institute

- 지방자치인재개발원
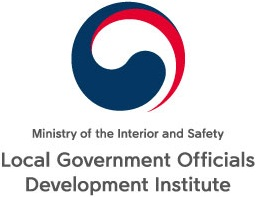

Agency overview
- Formed: September 1, 1965
- Headquarters: 150 Bangyo-ro, Iseo-myeon, Wanju-gun, Jeollabuk-do, Republic of Korea
- Agency executive: Bae Jin-hwan, President
- Parent agency: Ministry of the Interior and Safety (MOIS)
- Website: www.logodi.go.kr/en

Korean name
- Hangul: 지방자치인재개발원
- Hanja: 地方自治人材開發院
- RR: Jibang jachi injae gaebarwon
- MR: Chibang chach'i injae kaebarwŏn

Local Government Officials Development Institute (LOGODI; Korean: 지방자치인재개발원) is a training institute under the Ministry of the Interior and Safety in the Republic of Korea. It conducts the education and training of managerial and senior officials from local governments and institutions, and provides support via policies and guidelines to the training centers of metropolitan and provincial governments in Korea. It further hosts international programs for capacity building and joint initiatives with public officials from governments of other countries. It is headed by a president and is currently headquartered in Jeonbuk Innovation City.

== History ==
- September 1965: Established under the Ministry of Home Affairs as the Local Administration Training Institute (LATI) in Seoul.
- January 1978: Relocated to Suwon, in accordance with a government policy to reduce congestion in the capital.
- January 1999: Merged with training institutions under six ministries and administrations to form the National Institute of Professional Administration (NIPA).
- January 2005: Reorganized as the Local Government Officials Development Institute (LOGODI).
- August 2013: Relocated to Jeonbuk Innovation City, in following with the government's initiative for "balanced regional development."

== Structure and functions ==
=== Structure ===
- Planning Department (3) : General Services Division, Planning & Cooperation Division, International Training & Cooperation Division
- Training Department (5): Training Coordination Division, Policy Leader Development Division, Specialized Capacity Building Division, Local Council Training Center, Assessment & Development Center
- Faculty (4)

=== Functions ===
- Strengthening the expertise of local government officials
- Guiding and supporting 15 metropolitan and provincial training institutes across Korea
- Carrying out international programs for the capacity building of officials in developing countries

== Training programs ==
=== Domestic ===
- 10-Month Programs (5)
  - Senior Policy Managers
  - Senior Leaders
  - Junior Leaders
  - Global Leaders
  - Women Leaders
- New G5 Leaders Program (1)
- Policy and Specialized Programs (50)
  - Policy Training (11)
  - Specialized Training (30)
  - Local Public Enterprises (6)
  - Elected Officials (3)
- E-Learning Programs (160)

=== International ===
- Organized by LOGODI (6)
  - Study Visit Program for Senior Officials of Mongolia
  - Study Visit Program for NAOG Faculty and Senior Officials of Mongolia
  - On-Site Training in Peru
  - On-Site Training in Mongolia
  - Local Administration Development Program
  - LOGODI-Tsinghua Annual Seminar
- Organized in cooperation with the Korea International Cooperation Agency (KOICA) (4)
  - Capacity Development in Public Administration for Peru
  - Local Administration Capacity Building Program
  - PNSA Training of Trainers (TOT) Program
  - Palestine HRD Program

== Partners ==
=== MOUs ===
- 2002 - : National Academy of Governance (NAOG | Mongolia)
- 2007 - : Local Government Training Institute (LGTI | Tanzania)
- 2008 - : National Management Institute (NMI | Egypt) Revised in 2022.2. National Institute of Governance and Sustainable Development (NIGSD)
- 2008 - : Tsinghua University, School of Continuing Education (SCETU | China)
- 2012 - : Sukhothai Thammathirat Open University (STOU | Thailand)
- 2017 - : National Authority for Civil Service (SERVIR | Peru)

=== International organizations ===
- United Cities and Local Governments (UGLG)
- International Association of School and Institutes of Administration (IASIA)
- Eastern Regional Organization for Public Administration (EROPA)

== Directives and regulations ==
=== Directives ===
1. Rules on the Operation of the Health Promotion Center (건강증진센터 운영 규정)
2. Rules on the Operation of the Public Official Education Fund (공무원교육상 기금운영 규정)
3. Rules on the Maintenance and Use of Notebook Computers for Educational Purposes (교육용 노트북컴퓨터의 관리 및 이용에 관한 규정)
4. LOGODI Rules on the Payment of Publicity Material Expenses (지방행정연수원 홍보용 콘텐츠 제작비 지급에 관한 규정)
5. Rules on the Organization and Operation of the Bureau as Relocated to Jeonbuk (전북이전 추진단의 구성 및 운영에 관한 규정)
6. LOGODI Rules on the Selection and Payment of Instructors (지방행정연수원 강사선정 및 수당지급 규정)
7. LOGODI Rules on the Management of Adjunct Professors (지방행정연수원 겸임교수 운영 규정)
8. Rules on the Maintenance of Athletic Facilities at LOGODI & Gyeonggi HR Development Institute (지방행정연수원‧경기도인재개발원 체육시설 운영관리 규정)
9. LOGODI Rules on the Payment of Research Assistance for Instructors (지방행정연수원 교수연구보조비 등 지급 규정)
10. LOGODI Rules on Overseas Training and International Cooperation Activities (지방행정연수원 국외훈련 및 국제협력업무 규정)
11. LOGODI Rules on Overtime and Emergency Work (지방행정연수원 당직 및 비상근무에 관한 규정)
12. LOGODI Rules on the Maintenance and Use of Library Materials (지방행정연수원 도서관 자료관리 및 이용 규정)
13. LOGODI Rules on Fire Prevention (지방행정연수원 방화 관리 규정)
14. LOGODI Rules on the Appointment of Special Lecturers (지방행정연수원 별정직 교수요원 임용 규정)
15. LOGODI Rules on the Hosting and Decorum of Buzz Sessions (지방행정연수원 분임토의 운영 및 지도 규정)
16. LOGODI Rules on Logos, Marks, and Symbols (지방행정연수원 상징물에 관한 규정)
17. LOGODI Rules on the Maintenance of Facilities (지방행정연수원 시설 관리운영 규정)
18. LOGODI Rules on the Collection of Fees for Facility Use (지방행정연수원 시설물 사용료 징수 규정)
19. LOGODI Rules on Catering Services (지방행정연수원 식당 위탁운영 규정)
20. LOGODI Rules on Training (지방행정연수원 연수 규정)
21. LOGODI Rules on the Delegation of Authority (지방행정연수원 위임전결 규정)
22. LOGODI Rules on the Publicity of Information (지방행정연수원 정보공개 운영규정)
23. LOGODI Rules on Access Control (지방행정연수원 출입관리 규정)
24. LOGODI Rules on Assessment and Evaluation (지방행정연수원 평가관리 규정)
25. LOGODI Rules on Awards (지방행정연수원 포상 규정)
26. Rules on the Operation of LOGODI's History Museum (지방행정연수원 행정역사실 운영 규정)
27. LOGODI Rules on the Installation of Image Information Processors (지방행정연수원 영상정보처리기기 설치운영규정)

=== Regulations ===
1. Guidelines on the Administration of E-Learning (사이버교육 운영 지침)
2. Rules on the Operation of LOGODI's Hope Sharing Bank (지방행정연수원 희망나눔뱅크 운영규정)

== Resources ==
- Official website
