= Central Disaster and Safety Countermeasures Headquarters =

- 중앙재난안전대책본부

Agency overview
- Jurisdiction: South Korea
- Headquarters: Sejong City
- Parent agency: Ministry of the Interior and Safety
- Website: Official website

The Central Disaster and Safety Countermeasures Headquarters (Korean: 중앙재난안전대책본부, CDSCHQ) is an emergency operations center of South Korea under the Ministry of the Interior and Safety that oversees and coordinates matters related to response to and recovery from large-scale disasters in the country and takes necessary measures.

== Organization ==
CDSCHQ is headed by the Minister of the Interior and Safety. In the case of an overseas disaster, the Minister of Foreign Affairs exercises the authority of the Central Disaster and Safety Countermeasures Headquarters. In the case of a radioactive disaster, the Chairman of the Nuclear Safety and Security Commission (NSSC), who also serves as the head of the Central Disaster and Safety Countermeasures Headquarters, exercises the authority of the Headquarters.

The Minister of Interior and Safety may, upon recommendation by the Minister or by his/her own authority, change the head of the headquarters to the Prime Minister. In this case, one of the Minister of Interior and Safety, the Minister of Foreign Affairs, or the Chairman of the NSSC will be appointed as the deputy head according to each type of disaster. The head of the headquarters may, as necessary, command the head of the Central Accident Response Headquarters, the city/provincial disaster safety countermeasures headquarters, or the city/county/district disaster safety countermeasures headquarters.
