= National Emergency Management Agency (South Korea) =

2004–2014 South Korean government agency

National Emergency Management Agency Republic of Korea
- 소방방재청

Agency overview
- Formed: June 1, 2004
- Dissolved: November 19, 2014
- Jurisdiction: Government of South Korea
- Headquarters: Central Government Complex, Jongno-gu, Seoul, South Korea
- Agency executives: Nam Sang-ho (last), General Fire Marshal; Jo Song-rae (last), Fire Marshal

Korean name
- Hangul: 소방방재청
- Hanja: 消防防災廳
- RR: Sobang bangjaecheong
- MR: Sobang pangjaech'ŏng

The National Emergency Management Agency (NEMA; Korean: 소방방재청) was an agency of South Korea, initially created by Enactment of the "Act on Promotion of Fire Fighting Industry" of 2008 and seized control on 19 November 2014 as the Ministry of Public Safety and Security was founded at the same day on the incident of the MV Sewol ferry disaster. The agency's primary purpose is to coordinate the response to any disaster that has occurred in South Korea which overwhelms the resources of local government authorities. The disaster management system of Korea goes back to "Buyeok" (compulsory service) in the era of the Three Kingdoms, which was succeeded by the Hyangyak in the Joseon Dynasty and then by the ‘Civil Defense Basic Law’ enacted in 1975 after independence. The NEMA, whose predecessor is the ‘Headquarters of Civil Defense and Disaster Management’ under the control of the Ministry of Government Administration and Home Affairs, was opened on June 1, 2004 for the purpose of protecting the lives and property of the people from the large-scale disasters that have occurred repeatedly every year since 1990s. The NEMA consists of 1 officer, 3 bureaus, 19 divisions and 4 affiliated organizations. A total of 435 people (267 for the main office and 168 for the affiliated organizations) work for the NEMA. Through the execution of 12 laws including the Disaster and Safety Management Basic Law, it is taking the lead in the national disaster management work of protecting the lives and property of the people.

== Mission ==
- To strengthen policy deliberation and general coordination through the unification of disaster-related working systems. Establishing a disaster and safety management system for the nation and local self-governing bodies for the preservation of the land and the protection of the lives, bodies and property of the people from various disasters.
- To heighten disaster-prevention awareness and to strengthen preventive investment. Expanding the investments, rather than costs, of businesses for the prevention of disasters.
- To strengthen on-the-spot-action systems such as rescue and relief. Establishing a new emergency rescue control team (National Emergency Management Agency).
- To strengthen local self-governing bodies’ disaster management and civil-governmental cooperative systems. Restructuring disaster-related local organizations and their functions, and strengthening on-the-spot-action systems through civil-governmental cooperation.
- To establish a system of preventive activities to make the people more safety-conscious. Holding safety-related cultural activities in order to heighten the people's safety consciousness.

== History ==
- 2004-03-15: The preparatory body for opening the NEMA set sail.
- 2004-06-01: The NEMA was opened.
- 2014-11-19: The NEMA had been changed to Central Fire Service under the Ministry of Public Safety and Security was founded at the same day on the incident of the MV Sewol ferry disaster.

== See also ==
Kim Myeong-hyeon
