= Ministry of the Interior and Safety =

Government ministry of South Korea

- 행정안전부

Agency overview
- Formed: July 26, 2017
- Preceding agency: Ministry of Public Safety and Security
- Jurisdiction: Government of South Korea
- Headquarters: Sejong City
- Minister responsible: Yun Ho-jung
- Deputy Ministers responsible: Ko Ki-dong, Deputy secretary; Yi Han-kyung, General Director for Disaster and Safety Management
- Child agencies: National Fire Agency; National Police Agency
- Website: http://www.mois.go.kr/eng/

Korean name
- Hangul: 행정안전부
- Hanja: 行政安全部
- RR: Haengjeong anjeonbu
- MR: Haengjŏng anjŏnbu

The Ministry of the Interior and Safety (MIS, Korean: 행정안전부) is a branch of the Government of South Korea. The headquarters are in Sejong City. It is responsible for national administration, management of government organizations, and e-government. Furthermore, it supports local governments in terms of local administration, finance, and regional development to promote greater local autonomy.

== Institutions ==
It has its headquarters and several offices in Sejong City. It also has offices in Jongno-gu, Seoul. Previously the headquarters were in Seoul.

Institutions:

- Local Government Officials Development Institute (LOGODI)
- National Archives of Korea
- National Forensic Service
- National Computing and Information Service
- National Fire Agency
- National Police Agency
- Committee for the Five Northern Korean Provinces

== List of ministers ==
No.	Portrait	Name	Term of office			President
No.	Portrait	Name	Took office	Left office	Time in office	President
1		Kim Boo-kyum	26 July 2017	5 April 2019	1 year, 253 days	Moon Jae-in
2		Chin Young	8 April 2019	23 December 2020	1 year, 259 days	Moon Jae-in
3		Jeon Hae-cheol	24 December 2020	9 May 2022	1 year, 136 days	Moon Jae-in
4		Lee Sang-min	12 May 2022	8 December 2024	2 years, 210 days	Yoon Suk Yeol
5		Yun Ho-jung	19 July 2025	incumbent	1 year, 63 days	Lee Jae-myung

== See also ==
- Republic Of Korea Civil Defense Corps
- Ministry of Security and Public Administration
- Central Disaster and Safety Countermeasures Headquarters
