= 2015 in South Korea =

- Centuries: 20th; 21st
- Decades: 1990s; 2000s; 2010s; 2020s; 2030s
- See also: Other events of 2015; Years in South Korea; Timeline of Korean history 2015 in North Korea

The following lists events that happened in 2015 in South Korea.

== Incumbents ==
- President: Park Geun-hye
- Prime Minister:
  - until 16 February: Chung Hong-won
  - 16 February-27 April: Lee Wan-koo
  - 27 April-18 June: Choi Kyoung-hwan
  - starting 18 June: Hwang Kyo-ahn

=== Governors ===
- Gyeonggi: Nam Kyung-pil
- Gangwon: Choi Moon-soon
- North Chungcheong: Lee Si-jong
- South Chungcheong: An Hee-jung
- North Jeolla: Song Ha-jin
- South Jeolla: Lee Nak-yon
- North Gyeongsang: Kim Kwan-yong
- South Gyeongsang: Hong Joon-pyo
- Jeju: Won Hee-ryong

== Events ==
=== January ===
- 5 January - South Korea announces that it will repatriate the remains of Chinese People's Liberation Army soldiers killed in the Korean War.

=== February ===
- 27 February - A shooting occurs in Hwaseong, Gyeonggi.

=== March ===
- 5 March - A knife-wielding assailant injures the American ambassador to South Korea, Mark W. Lippert, in the South Korean capital city of Seoul. Authorities report that the injuries on his face and wrist are not life-threatening.

=== May ===
- 20 May - The beginning of the Middle East respiratory syndrome outbreak

=== June ===
- A drought occurs in South Korea and neighboring country North Korea.

=== July ===
- 1 July - A bus accident in Ji'an, China results in the death of 10 Koreans and the Chinese bus driver.

=== September ===
- 9 September - The Dolgorae sinks near Chuja Island.

== Film ==
- List of 2015 box office number-one films in South Korea
- 20th Busan International Film Festival
- 2nd Wildflower Film Awards

== Music ==
- List of number-one hits of 2015
- List of Gaon Album Chart number ones of 2015
- List of number-one streaming songs of 2015

== Deaths ==
- 22 February - Kim Kyung-roul, South Korean billiards player (b. 1980)
- 25 June - Kim Byung-chan, weightlifter.

== See also ==
- List of South Korean films of 2015
- 2015 in South Korean music
- 2015 in South Korean football
- Years in South Korea
