= 2011 in South Korea =

- Centuries: 20th; 21st
- Decades: 1990s; 2000s; 2010s; 2020s; 2030s
- See also: Other events of 2011; Years in South Korea; Timeline of Korean history 2011 in North Korea

Events in the year 2011 in South Korea.

== Incumbents ==
- President: Lee Myung-bak, President of South Korea (2008–2013)
- Prime Minister: Kim Hwang-sik, Prime Minister of South Korea (2010–2013)

=== Governors ===
- Gyeonggi: Kim Moon-soo
- Gangwon: Choi Moon-soon
- North Chungcheong: Lee Si-jong
- South Chungcheong: An Hee-jung
- North Jeolla: Kim Wan-ju
- South Jeolla: Park Jun-young
- North Gyeongsang: Kim Kwan-yong
- South Gyeongsang: Hong Joon-pyo
- Jeju: Woo Geun-min

== Events ==
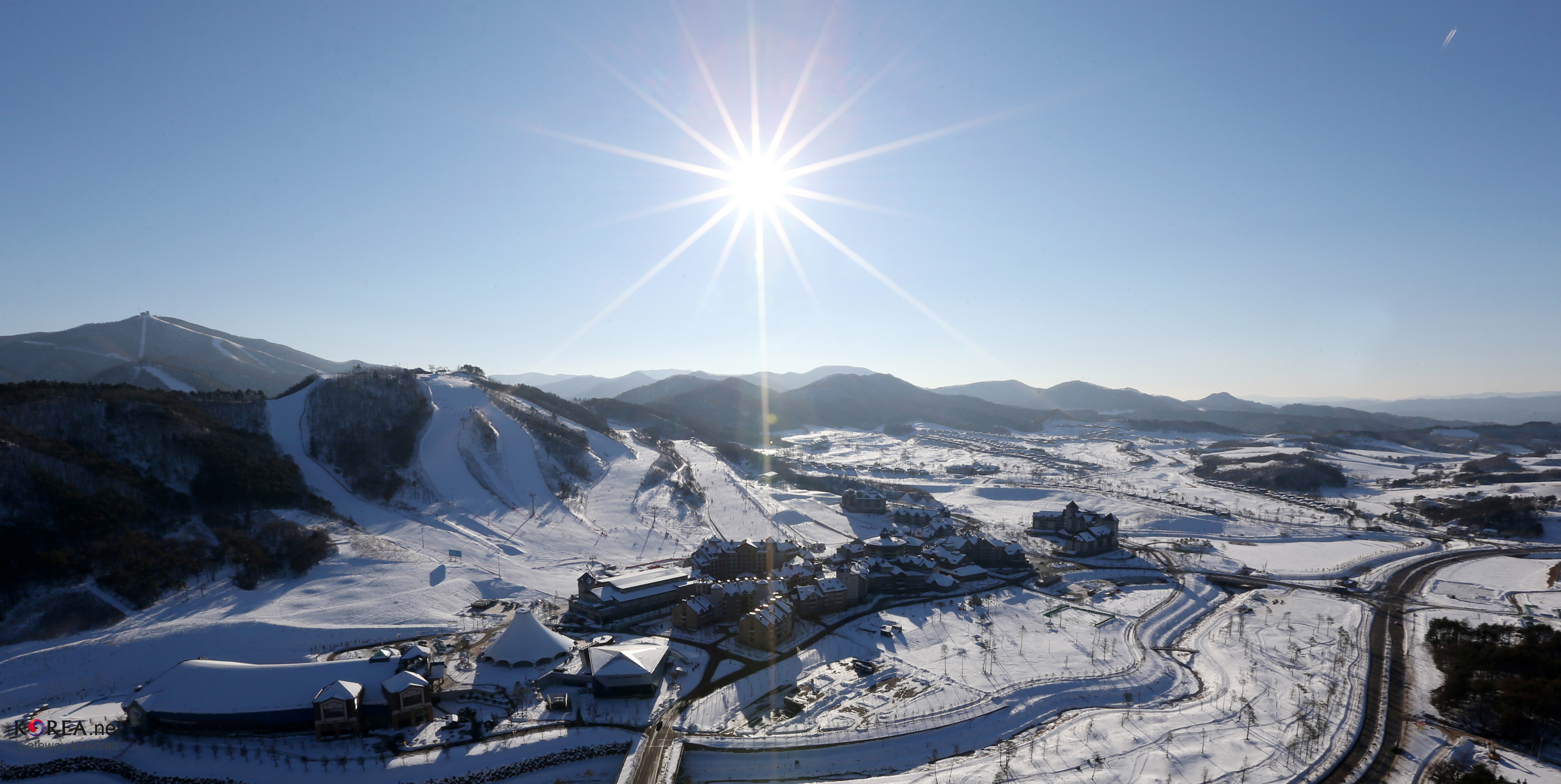
Aerial view of Pyeongchang

- 2011 South Korean University Tuition Crisis
- January 18–21: Operation Dawn of Gulf of Aden
- February 9: The first military talks with North Korea in months abruptly end with the North walking out.
- March: The Posco Tower-Songdo in the Songdo International Business District, South Korea is completed. It surpasses the previous record holder for being South Korea's tallest, the Samsung Tower Palace G.
- March 2: 2011 Gyeongryeolbi island fishing incident
- April: The South Korean armed forces adopts a new oath of enlistment for its servicemen, as the previous version contained nationalist overtones.
- April 27: The first of 2 South Korean by-elections
- April 27: Naneun Ggomsuda debuted.
- July 6: The International Olympic Committee awards the 2018 Winter Olympics to Pyeongchang.
- July 25–28: 2011 Seoul floods
- July 28: Asiana Airlines Flight 991
- August 24: 2011 Seoul Free Lunch referendum
- September 15: 2011 South Korea blackout
- November 29: The Korean Labor Unions Confederation is founded.
- October 26: The 2nd by-election and the accompanying DDoS attacks
- December 12: 2011 Incheon fishing incident
- December 15: Brawl Busters video game is released.

== Film ==
- List of South Korean films of 2011
- List of 2011 box office number-one films in South Korea
- 32nd Blue Dragon Film Awards
- 48th Grand Bell Awards
- 16th Busan International Film Festival

== Television ==
- 2011 KBS Drama Awards
- 4th Korea Drama Awards
- 2011 MBC Drama Awards
- 2011 SBS Drama Awards

== Music ==
- 2011 in South Korean music
- List of number-one hits of 2011
- List of Gaon Album Chart number ones of 2011
- List of number-one Streaming Songs of 2011
- 2011 Mnet Asian Music Awards

== Sport ==
- South Korea at the 2011 Asian Winter Games
- South Korea at the 2011 Summer Universiade
- South Korea at the 2011 World Aquatics Championships
- South Korea at the 2011 World Championships in Athletics
- 2011 in South Korean football
- 2011 Korea Professional Baseball season
- 2011 World Taekwondo Championships
- 2011 World Championships in Athletics
- 2011 Asian Fencing Championships
- 2011 Korea Open Super Series Premier
- 2010 Korean Baduk League
- 2011 South Korean Figure Skating Championships
- World Cyber Games 2011
- 2011 Asian Amateur Boxing Championships
- 2011 Korean Grand Prix
