= 2014 in South Korea =

- Centuries: 20th; 21st
- Decades: 1990s; 2000s; 2010s; 2020s; 2030s
- See also: Other events of 2014; Years in South Korea; Timeline of Korean history 2014 in North Korea

Events in the year 2014 in South Korea.

== Incumbents ==
- President: Park Geun-hye
- Prime Minister: Jung Hong-won

=== Governors ===
- Gyeonggi: Nam Kyung-pil
- Gangwon: Choi Moon-soon
- North Chungcheong: Lee Si-jong
- South Chungcheong: An Hee-jung
- North Jeolla: Song Ha-jin
- South Jeolla: Lee Nak-yon
- North Gyeongsang: Kim Kwan-yong
- South Gyeongsang: Hong Joon-pyo
- Jeju: Won Hee-ryong

== Events ==
=== February ===
- February 6 – Kim and Chae are rescued from the Sinan County salt farms.
- February 17 – A building collapse at a mountain resort in Gyeongju kills ten people.

=== March ===
- March 3 – Businessman Song Seung-ho was found dead at his own building in Naebalsan-dong, Seoul. Seoul councilman Kim Hyung-shik was later found responsible for aiding Song Seung-ho's murder.
- March 11 – The Canada–South Korea Free Trade Agreement is signed by Stephen Harper, the Prime Minister of Canada, and Park Geun-hye, the President of South Korea.

=== April ===
- April 8 – The Australia–Korea Free Trade Agreement is signed by the Australian Prime Minister Tony Abbott and South Korean President Park Geun-hye
- April 16 – A ferry carrying 476 people capsizes and sinks off the South Korean coast, killing at least 262 people and leaving 40 others missing.

=== May ===
- May 2 – The 2014 Seoul subway crash occurred.
- May 12 – ITX saemaeul was started operation

=== June ===
- June 4 – The 2014 South Korean local elections are held.

=== July ===
- July 16 – A fire incident aboard the train at Busan Metro in the South Korean port city of Busan with five people injured and 100 people were evacuated.
- July 17 – A firefighting helicopter searching for missing people from the sinking of MV Sewol in April crashes in the South Korean city of Gwangju with five people aboard.
- July 30 – 2014 South Korean by-elections

=== August ===
- 2014 South Korea floods

=== September ===
- September 3 – Ladies' Code was involved in an accident at Yeongdong Expressway leading to deaths of members EunB and RiSe.
- September 19 – The Asian Games take place in Incheon, South Korea.

=== October ===
- October 17 – Pangyo Techno Valley Vents Collapse

=== December ===
- December 5 – Korean Air flight 086 was returned to gate at JFK airport because vice-president of Korean Air and a passenger aboard the plane, Heather Cho, became enraged about Macadamia service. As a result, the flight arrived at Incheon International Airport 11 minutes late.

== Films ==
- 19th Busan International Film Festival
- 51st Grand Bell Awards
- 1st Wildflower Film Awards
- 35th Blue Dragon Film Awards

== Television ==
- 3rd APAN Star Awards
- 2014 KBS Drama Awards
- 7th Korea Drama Awards
- 2014 MBC Drama Awards
- 2014 SBS Drama Awards

== Music ==
- List of number-one hits of 2014
- List of Gaon Album Chart number ones of 2014
- List of number-one Streaming Songs of 2014
- 2014 Mnet Asian Music Awards

== Sports ==
- April 20–26 – 2014 IIHF World Championship Division I (Group A)
- July 18–26 – South Korea finish top of the table at the 2014 IPC Shooting World Championships winning ten gold medals from 27 events.
- September 19 – October 4 – 2014 Asian Games

== Deaths ==
- September - Kim Song-ae, 89, president (Former of First Lady Of North Korea)
- September 3 – Go Eun-bi, 21, singer (Ladies' Code)
- September 7 – Kwon Rise, 23, singer (Ladies' Code)
- October 27 – Shin Hae-chul, 46, singer-songwriter, producer, artist, activist (N.EX.T)
