= 2010 in South Korea =

- Centuries: 20th; 21st
- Decades: 1990s; 2000s; 2010s; 2020s; 2030s
- See also: Other events in 2010; Years in South Korea; Timeline of Korean history 2010 in North Korea

Events in the year 2010 in South Korea.

== Incumbents ==
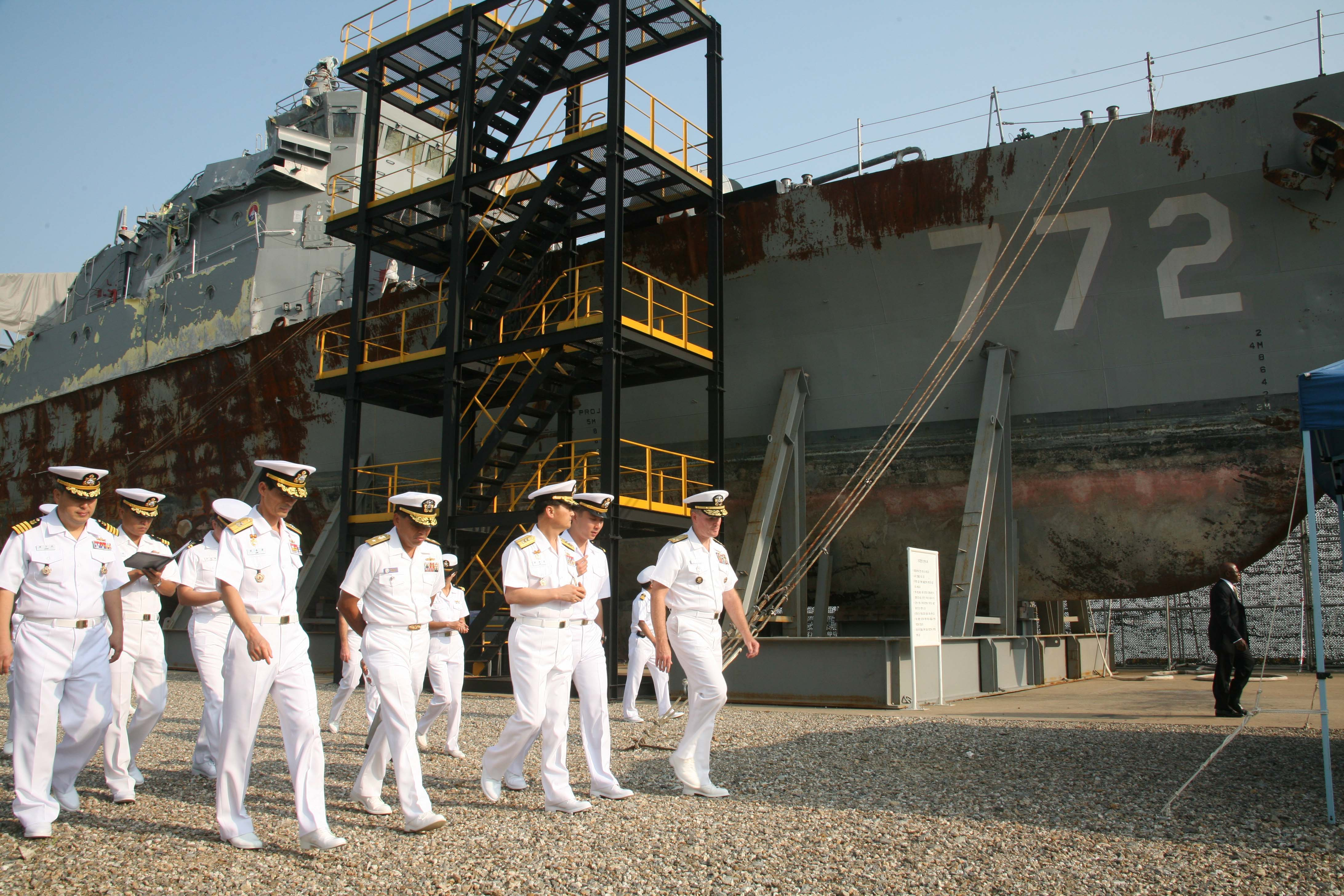
South Korean and US Navy admirals inspecting the wreckage of the Cheonan at Pyeongtaek on September 13, 2010.

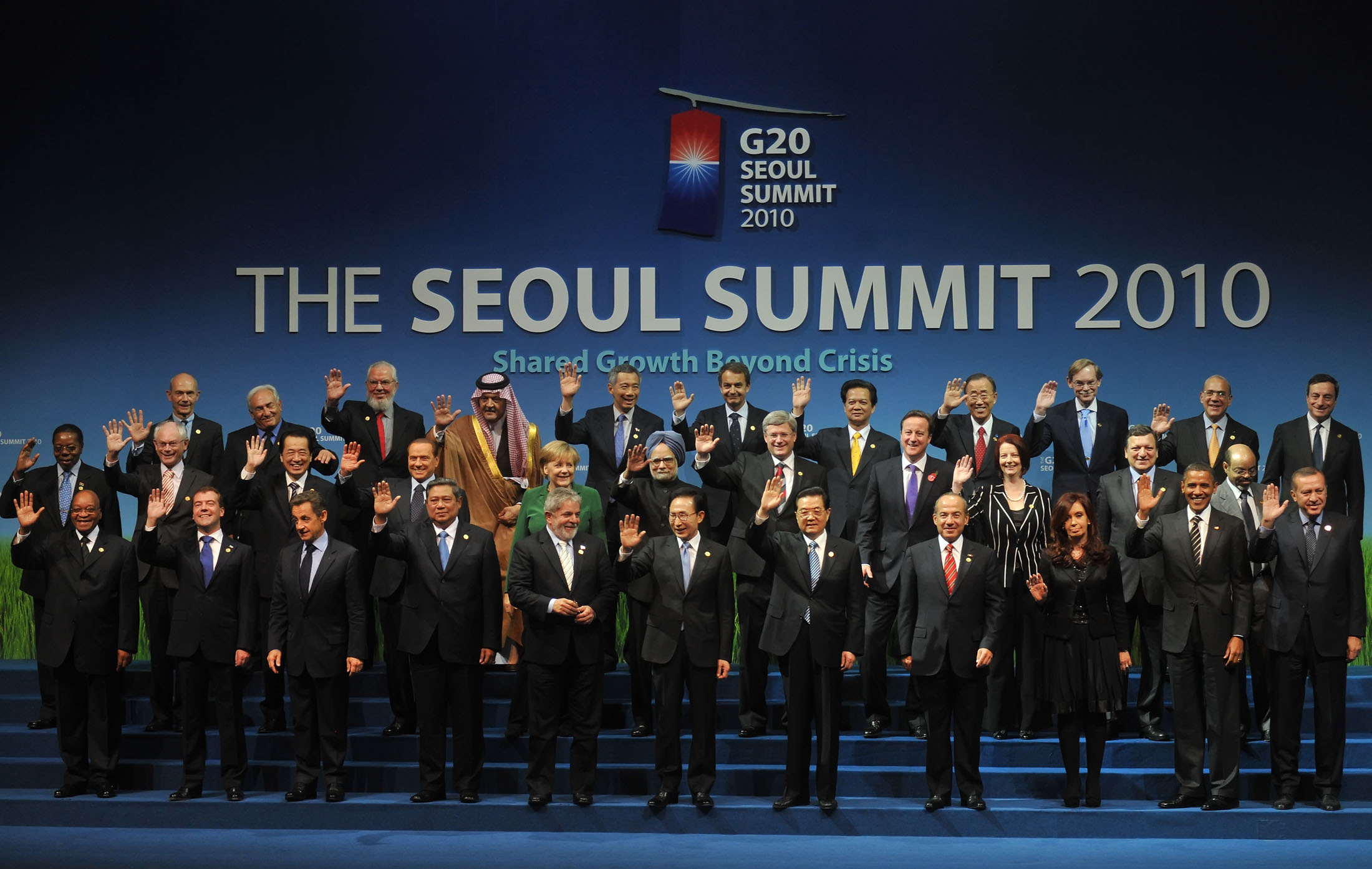
Leaders of the G-20 countries present at the Seoul Summit.

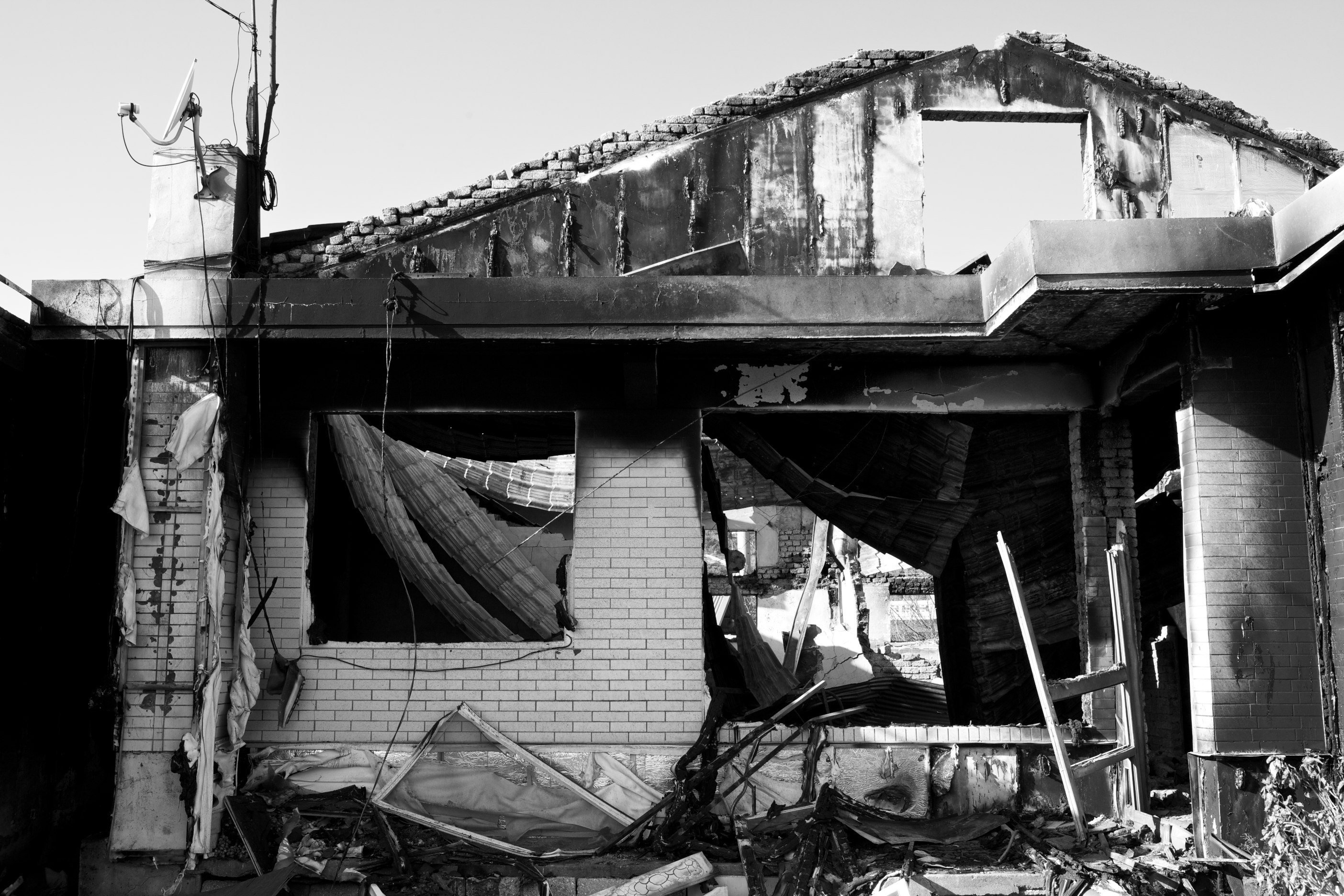
A building damaged by fire after the Bombardment of Yeonpyeong.

- President – Lee Myung-bak, President of South Korea (2008–2013)
- Prime Ministers –
  - Chung Un-chan, Prime Minister of South Korea (2009–2010)
  - Yoon Jeung-hyun, Acting Prime Minister of South Korea (2010)
  - Kim Hwang-sik, Prime Minister of South Korea (2010–2013)

=== Governors ===
- Gyeonggi: Kim Moon-soo
- Gangwon: Choi Moon-soon
- North Chungcheong: Lee Si-jong
- South Chungcheong: An Hee-jung
- North Jeolla: Kim Wan-ju
- South Jeolla: Park Jun-young
- North Gyeongsang: Kim Kwan-yong
- South Gyeongsang: Kim Doo-gwan
- Jeju: Woo Geun-min

== Events ==
=== January ===
- January 4 – South Korea is affected by the heaviest snowfall in 70 years, causing widespread disruption.
- January 9 – The 2010 South Korean Figure Skating Championships are held in Seoul.

=== February ===
- February 25 – The Constitutional Court of Korea rules the death penalty as a constitutional rule that must be preserved.
- February 26 – Kim Yuna becomes the women's single skating world champion at the 2010 Winter Olympics, and sets a new world record with 228.56 points overall.

=== March ===
- March 2 – The Ministry of Education creates a new teacher evaluation system.
- March 26 – The ROKS Cheonan sinks while carrying 104 personnel off the country's west coast, killing 46.
- March 30 – One South Korean naval diver is hospitalized and another diver, Han Ju-ho, dies after losing consciousness whilst searching for survivors from the Cheonan.

=== April ===
- April 3 – The South Korean government calls off the rescue operation for the missing Cheonan sailors.
- April 15 – The Cheonan's stern is raised from the seabed and is transported to the Pyongtaek navy base for investigation.
- April 21 – South Korea discovers two North Korean assassins plotting to assassinate Hwang Jang-yop, a senior official who defected from North to South Korea.
- April 23 – North Korea seizes five properties owned by South Korea in Mount Kumgang.
- April 24 – The bow portion of the Cheonan is salvaged. The bodies of 40 seamen out of the 46 killed are recovered.
- April 26 – The South Korean government announces the completion of the world's longest seawall in a reclaimed tidal flat in Gunsan, North Jeolla Province.
- April 27 – Oh Eun-Sun becomes the first woman to successfully scale all of the world's 14 highest peaks.
- April 29 – The deceased sailors of the Cheonan are given a joint funeral.

=== May ===
- May 20 – A South Korean-led investigation carried out by a team of international experts from South Korea, the United States, the United Kingdom, Canada, Australia, and Sweden presents a summary of its investigation into the Cheonan sinking, concluding that the warship had been sunk by a North Korean torpedo fired by a midget submarine.
- May 29 – President Lee Myung-bak, Chinese Premier Wen Jiabao, and Japanese Prime Minister Yukio Hatoyama meet in Jeju in a trilateral summit to discuss strengthening trade ties and the effects of the Cheonan incident.

=== June ===
- June 2 – The 2010 South Korean local elections are held.
- June 2 – The South Korean government announces that it will spend 11.3 billion won (US$9.3 million) until 2013 to support research on key three-dimensional 3D TV technologies.
- June 10 – The second launch of Naro-1 ends in failure after 137 seconds when the rocket explodes and contact is lost.
- June 22 – The South Korea national football team qualifies for the knockout stages of the 2010 World Cup with 4 points, winning 2–0 against Greece, losing 4–1 to Argentina, and drawing 2–2 with Nigeria.

=== July ===
- July 1 – The historical cities of Masan, Changwon, and Jinhae, merge to create the Unified Changwon City, with a population of 1.04 million.
- July 9 – The Bank of Korea unexpectedly raises interest rates from 2% to 2.25%.
- July 26 – South Korea and the United States begin navy and air force maneuvers in the Sea of Japan (East Sea) with intent to "rattle" North Korea.
- July 28 – Grand National Party wins five out of eight seats in National Assembly by-elections.
- July 29 – Prime Minister Chung Un-chan offers his resignation.

=== August ===
- August 1 – South Korea women's national under-20 football team beats Colombia 1–0 in the third-place match.
- August 9 – North Korea fires over 100 rounds of artillery into the Sea of Japan.
- August 10 – Chung Un-Chan officially resigns. The Prime Minister of Japan Naoto Kan apologizes to South Korea for the colonization of the Korean peninsula in the early 1900s.
- August 11 – Typhoon Dianmu strikes in the Southern Korean Peninsula.
- August 15 – Gwangbokjeol, Restoration work on the Gwanghwamun finishes and is revealed to the public.
- August 16 – The Republic of Korea Armed Forces and the United States armed forces ignore warnings from North Korea, and start a new round of the Ulchi-Freedom Guardian drills in South Korea.

=== September ===
- September 2 – Typhoon Kompasu strikes on the west coast of the Korean Peninsula.
- September 4 – Yu Myung-hwan resigns as Minister for Foreign Affairs and Trade amid accusations of nepotism after his daughter is hired to a mid-level position in his Ministry.
- September 13 – An independent investigation into the sinking of the ROKS Cheonan finds evidence of North Korean involvement, although this claim is disputed.
- September 25 – The 2010 FIFA U-17 Women's World Cup gives Korea their first FIFA World Cup title.
- September 29 – Kim Jong-un, the son of North Korean leader Kim Jong-il, is appointed to two party posts in a gradual transfer of power.

=== October ===
- October 1 – The 2010 Busan fire starts and is extinguished on the same day. No casualties are reported.
- October 6 – European Union–South Korea Free Trade Agreement
- October 7 – The 15th Busan International Film Festival is held.
- October 9 – Seoul international fireworks festival.
- October 23 – In preparation for the Seoul summit, finance ministers of the G-20 agree to reform the International Monetary Fund and shift 6% of the voting shares to developing nations and countries with emerging markets.
- October 24 – Korean Grand Prix.
- October 27 – The local by-elections.
- October 30 – Family reunions take place in North Korea between North and South Korean families separated during the Korean War.

=== November ===
- November 1 – The Gyongbu express line is opened at Dongdaegu~Singyongju~Ulsan~Busan.
- November 6 – Somali pirates receive a record £7.6m in ransoms for seized South Korean and Singaporean ships.
- November 11 – 12 – The G-20 summit is held in Seoul, South Korea. Korea became the first non-G8 nation to host a G-20 leaders summit.
- November 11 – Lotte Corporation gains approval from the government to start construction of the Lotte World Tower in the Songpa District, Seoul, South Korea.
- November 13 – Seongnam Ilhwa Chunma wins the 2010 AFC Champions League.
- November 18 – The College Scholastic Ability Test.
- November 18 – A government report finds that the Sunshine Policy adopted by the former government had not resulted in changes to Pyongyang's behavior.
- November 23 – North Korea shells Yeonpyeong Island, prompting a military response by South Korea. The incident causes an escalation of tension on the Korean Peninsula and prompts widespread international condemnation. The United Nations declares it to be one of the most serious incidents since the end of the Korean War.

=== December ===
- December 2 – More than 55,000 animals are culled after a breakout of foot-and-mouth disease at pig farms in South Korea.
- December 13 – The 8.2 kilometer Busan-Geoje Fixed Link opens.
- December 18 – A Chinese fishing boat capsizes during a scuffle with a Republic of Korea Coast Guard boat, leaving one dead and two missing.
- December 20 – The Republic of Korea Marine Corps hold live-fire drill exercises on Yeonpyeong Island. North Korea said it will not retaliate.
- December 25 – Three fishermen from the People's Republic of China are released from South Korean custody.

== Deaths ==
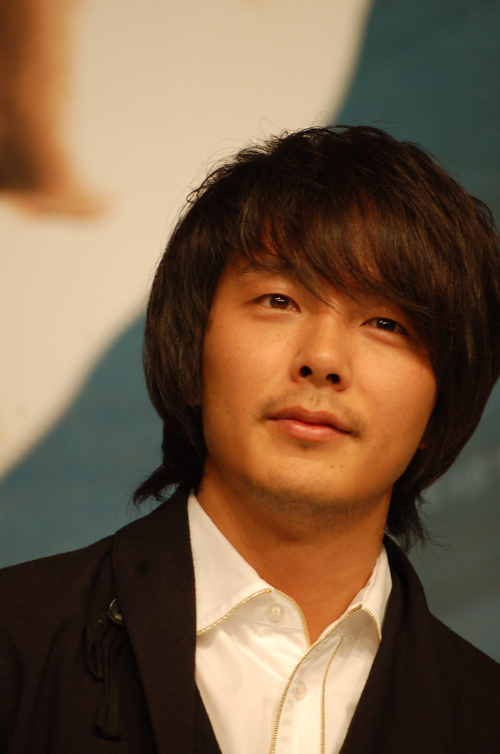
Park Yong Ha

- February 6 – Lee Yung-dug, 84, South Korean politician, Prime Minister (1994), pneumonia.
- February 7 – Lim Soo-hyeok, 40, South Korean baseball player (Lotte Giants), cardiac dysrhythmia.
- March 6 – Cho Gyeong-chul, astronomer, heart attack.
- March 29 – Choi Jin-young, actor and singer, suicide.
- June 30 – Park Yong-ha, 32, actor and singer, suicide.
- August 12 – André Kim, 74, fashion designer, pneumonia and colorectal cancer.
- October 10 – Hwang Jang-yop, politician in North Korea who defected to South Korea, heart attack.
- December 5 – Lee Young-hee, social activist, Cirrhosis.

== See also ==
- 2010 in South Korean music
