= 2013 in Korea =

2013 in Korea may refer to:

- 2013 in North Korea
- 2013 in South Korea
