= 2011 blackout =

2011 blackout may refer to:

- 2011 Chile blackout
- 2011 South Korea blackout
- 2011 Southwest blackout
