= 2009 in South Korea =

- Centuries: 20th; 21st
- Decades: 1980s; 1990s; 2000s; 2010s; 2020s
- See also: Other events in 2002; Years in South Korea; Timeline of Korean history 2009 in North Korea

Events from the year 2009 in South Korea.

== Incumbents ==
- President: Lee Myung-bak
- Prime Minister:
  - Han Seung-soo (until 28 September),
  - Chung Un-chan (starting 28 September)

=== Governors ===
- Gyeonggi: Kim Moon-soo
- Gangwon: Kim Jin-sun
- North Chungcheong: Chung Woo-taik
- South Chungcheong: Lee Wan-koo
- North Jeolla: Kim Wan-ju
- South Jeolla: Park Jun-young
- North Gyeongsang: Kim Kwan-yong
- South Gyeongsang: Kim Tae-ho
- Jeju: Kim Tae-hwan

== Events ==
=== January ===
- January 20 – The outbreak of bloodshed between police and residents in Yongsan.
- January 24 – Kang Ho-sun, serial killer of murdering 17 people, was arrested.
- January 31 – Open the all area of Gyeongbokgung to the public.

=== February ===
- February 10 – A fire at the Hwawang Mountain during the burning flame grass festival, killed 4 people and 60 wounded.
- February 25 – The key issues of new media laws are brought to the table.

=== March ===
- March 24 – The South Korea national baseball team lost in the 2009 World Baseball Classic final with a 3–5.
- March 29 – Kim Yuna set a new world record total of 207.71 as well as winning her first World Figure Skating Championships title.
- March 31 – An KF-16 fighter jet crashes to the Yellow Sea. However, the pilot escaped and survived.

=== April ===
- April 5 – North Korea launches its Kwangmyŏngsŏng-2 rocket.
- April 30 – Roh Moo-hyun, Former President, was summoned to the prosecution.

=== May ===
- May 4 – A South Korean Navy destroyer rescues a North Korean cargo ship from Somali pirates.
- May 14 – The South Korean Navy destroyer Mummu the Great and the U.S. Navy cruiser Gettysburg capture 17 suspected Somali pirates in the Gulf of Aden.
- May 18 – The third summit of Large Cities Climate Leadership Group was held in Seoul until May 21.
- May 21 – Supreme Court recognized a death with dignity.
- May 23 – Former President Roh Moo-hyun commits suicide.
- May 25 – North Korea announces that it has conducted a second successful nuclear test in the province of North Hamgyong. The United Nations Security Council condemns the reported test.
- May 29 – Former President Roh Moo-hyun was given a state funeral.

=== June ===
- June 7 – The South Korea national football team qualified for their eighth World Cup finals by beating the UAE 2–0 in a home match. It is the seventh consecutive time that the South Koreans have qualified for the tournament.
- June 15 – Lee Myung-bak, South Korea's president, meets U.S. President Barack Obama in Washington to talk about North Korea.
- June 18 – US, Japan, South Korea assist ADB funding to Arunachal Pradesh, old India and China territorial dispute
- June 23 – Bank of Korea released the 50,000 Won note.
- June 26 – The Royal Tombs of the Joseon Dynasty have been registered as a UNESCO World Heritage site.

=== July ===
- July 7 – July 2009 cyber attacks.
- July 15 – Seoul–Chuncheon Expressway was opened.
- July 22 – New Media special law was authoritatively passed.
- July 24 – Seoul Subway Line 9 was opened.
- July 28 – Chinese border police seize 70 kilograms of Vanadium metal bound for North Korea, a material used to manufacture missile components. 200,000RMB of the metal was seized at the Dandong border between China and North Korea.
- July 31 – Dongui Bogam have been registered as a UNESCO Memory of the World Programme.

=== August ===
- August 1 – Gwanghwamun Plaza was opened.
- August 6 – A company manager claims that a 77-day occupation of a car plant by hundreds of laid-off workers in South Korea has come to an end.
- August 18 – Kim Dae-jung, President of South Korea from 1998 to 2003, and the 2000 Nobel Peace Prize recipient died of multiple organ dysfunction syndrome in Seoul.
- August 23 – Former President Kim Dae-jung was given a state funeral.
- August 25 – Naro-1 was launched. However, a satellite did not reach a stable orbit.

=== September ===
- September 6 – South Korea asks North Korea to explain a sudden discharge of dam water which left six people dead or missing across the border.
- September 26 – Families separated meet at the Mount Kumgang resort, North Korea.

=== October ===
- October 12 – Korea established their second Ocean Research Station in Gageo Reef.
- October 19 – Incheon Bridge was opened.
- October 24 – Kia Tigers won the 2009 KBO season and 2009 Korean Series, which is the first double victory since 1997.
- October 28 – The main opposition Democratic Party wins three out of five seats in by-elections in South Korea.

=== November ===
- November 7 – Pohang Steelers beating Al-Ittihad 2–1 to win the title of 2009 AFC Champions League.
- November 10 – Battle of Daecheong.
- November 12 – The College Scholastic Ability Test which is given once a year took place.
- November 14 – A fire at a shooting range in Busan, killed 10 people including two Japanese tourists and injures six others.
- November 21 – Jeong Nam-gyu, one of South Korea's most prolific serial killers, commits suicide in his cell on death row.

=== December ===
- December 27 – A consortium led by Korea Electric Power gets a US$20.4-billion contract to build nuclear power plants in the United Arab Emirates, the largest-ever energy deal in the Middle East.

== Deaths ==
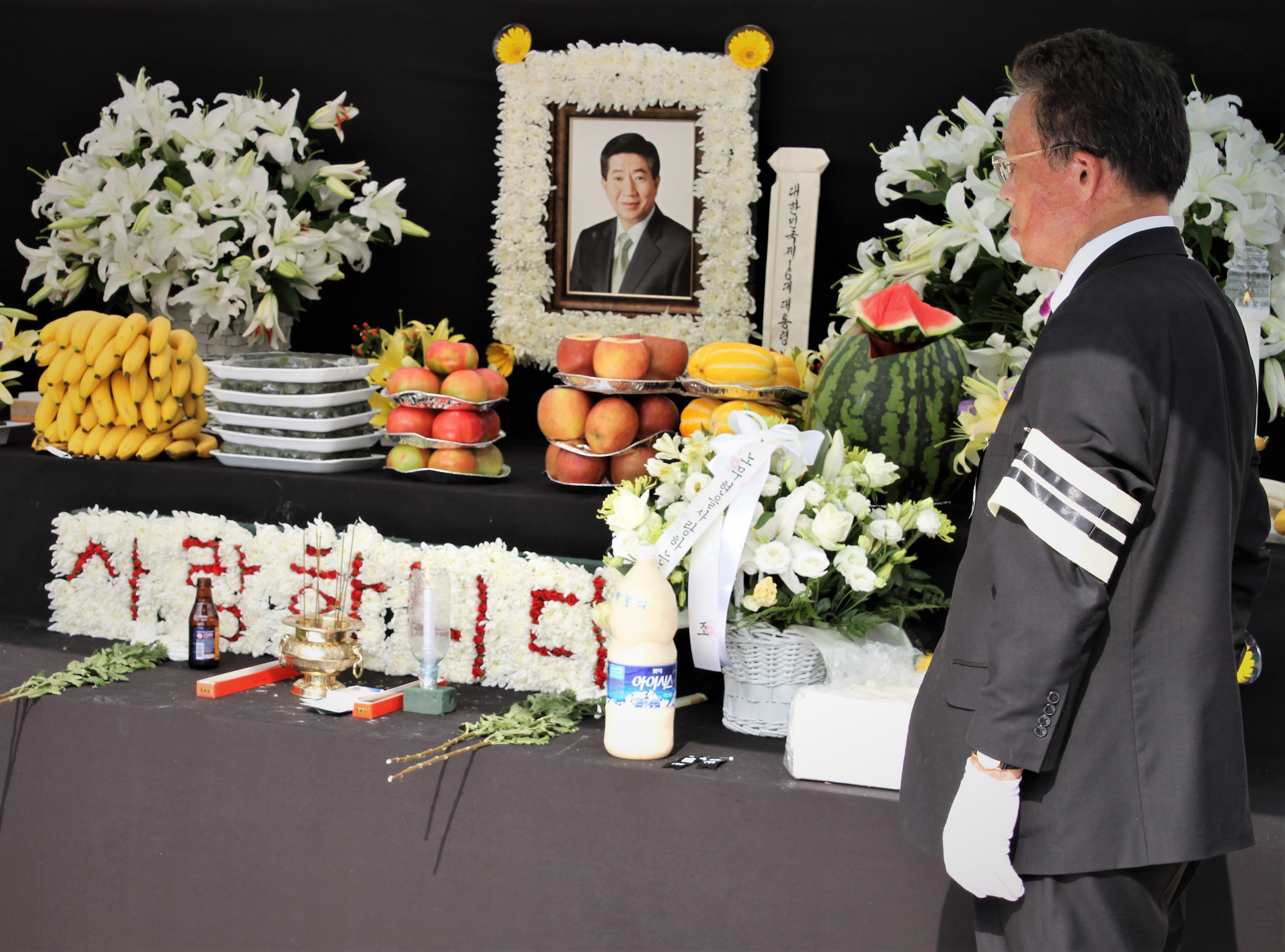
Sidewalk memorial for Former South Korean President Roh Moo-hyun set up across the street from Seoul City Hall on July 8, 2009.

- February 16 – Stephen Kim Sou-hwan, 86, South Korean Roman Catholic prelate, Archbishop of Seoul (1968–1998).
- March 7 – Jang Ja-yeon, 26, South Korean actress (Boys Over Flowers), suicide by hanging.
- April 27 – Woo Seung-yeon, 25, South Korean actress and model, suicide by hanging.
- May 17 – Jung Seung-hye, 44, South Korean film producer, colon cancer.
- May 22 – Yeo Woon-kay, 69, South Korean actress, kidney cancer.
- May 23 – Roh Moo-hyun, former president of South Korea (born 1946), suicide.
- June 3 -Do Kum-bong, 79, actress.
- June 28 – Yu Hyun-mok, 83, film director died of cerebral infarction.
- July 12 – Ko Mi Young, 42, Climber, false step.
- August 4 – Cho Oh Ryun, 57, South Korean Merman, heart attack.
- August 18 – Kim Dae-jung, 85, former president of South Korea, cardiac arrest.
- September 1 – Jang Jin-young, 37, South Korean actress, stomach cancer.
- October 31 – Lee Hurak, 85, Politician.
- November 4 – Park Yong-oh, 72, Enterpriser, suicide.
- November 19 – Daul Kim, 20, Model, suicide by hanging.

== See also ==
- 2009 in South Korean music
- List of South Korean films of 2009
