= 2012 in South Korea =

- Centuries: 20th; 21st
- Decades: 1990s; 2000s; 2010s; 2020s; 2030s
- See also: Other events of 2012; Years in South Korea; Timeline of Korean history 2012 in North Korea

Events in the year 2012 in South Korea.

== Incumbents ==
- President – Lee Myung-bak (2008–2013)
- Prime Minister – Kim Hwang-sik (2010–2013)

=== Governors ===
- Gyeonggi: Kim Moon-soo
- Gangwon: Choi Moon-soon
- North Chungcheong: Lee Si-jong
- South Chungcheong: An Hee-jung
- North Jeolla: Kim Wan-ju
- South Jeolla: Park Jun-young
- North Gyeongsang: Kim Kwan-yong
- South Gyeongsang: Hong Joon-pyo
- Jeju: Woo Geun-min

== Events ==
=== January ===
- The MOFAT Diamond Scandal is exposed.

=== February ===
- February 13 – The governing Grand National Party is renamed the Saenuri Party.

=== March ===
- March 8 – The South Korean military holds a live-fire land and air exercise near the North Korean border at Pocheon.
- March 12 – The South Korean government lodges a formal protest against Chinese claims to territorial jurisdiction over the Socotra Rock (Ieodo).
- March 15 – The South Korea–United States Free Trade Agreement comes into effect.
- March 22 – Korea National Oil Corporation announces a cut in imports of Iranian oil.
- March 23 – US President Barack Obama nominates Seoul-born Jim Yong Kim for the presidency of the World Bank.
- March 26–27 – The 2012 Nuclear Security Summit is held in Seoul, with over 55 leaders from around the world in attendance.
- March 29 – The Bank of Korea reports that with an easing global financial climate, South Korea returned to a current-account surplus in February.

=== April ===
- April 1 – The Blue House releases a statement alleging that over 80% of the cases brought to light in the South Korean illegal surveillance incident of 2010–12 took place under the previous administration of Roh Moo-hyun.
- April 11 – The 2012 legislative elections were held.

=== May ===
- May 2 – At the COEX Intercontinental Hotel KeSPA, Ongamenet, Blizzard Entertainment and GomTV announced the introduction of StarCraft II to professional competitions in South Korea with the Brood War being completely phased out in October.
- May 12 – August 12 – The Expo 2012 took place.

=== July ===
- July 18 - Tropical Storm Khanun makes landfall over South Jeolla Province.

=== September ===
- September 17 - Typhoon Sanba made landfall on South Korea.

=== October ===
- October 7 — Due to an agreement with the U.S., South Korea has been allowed to develop ballistic missiles with a range of as much as 800 km.

=== December ===
- December 19 – The 2012 presidential elections were held.

== Films ==
- 49th Grand Bell Awards
- 33rd Blue Dragon Film Awards
- 17th Busan International Film Festival

== Music ==
- 2012 in South Korean music
- List of number-one hits of 2012
- List of Gaon Album Chart number ones of 2012
- List of number-one Streaming Songs of 2012
- 2012 Mnet Asian Music Awards

== Sport ==
- 2012 in South Korean football
- 2012 Korean Grand Prix
- 2012 Korea Professional Baseball season
- 2012 South Korean Figure Skating Championships
- 2012 Korea Open Super Series Premier
- 2012 Korea Open Grand Prix Gold
- 2012 Asia Series
- 2012 Korean Series
- 2012 Asian Tour
- 2012 Asian Weightlifting Championships
- 2012 Asian Wrestling Championships
- 2012 Pacific-Asia Junior Curling Championships
- 2012 World Wheelchair Curling Championship
- South Korea at the 2012 Summer Olympics
- South Korea at the 2012 Summer Paralympics
- South Korea at the 2012 Asian Beach Games
- South Korea at the 2012 Winter Youth Olympics
