= 2010 G20 Toronto summit preparations =

2010 G20 Toronto summit preparations had already begun in advance of the announcement of the meeting venue. Preparations for the important topics to be discussed at the summit evolved in tandem with practical planning for the meeting as a venue and as an event.

Plans for the gathering of G8 leaders in Muskoka included an early and continuing investment in security projections which encompassed Toronto and Pearson International Airport. When subsequent decision-making caused Toronto to be named as a site for a G20 summit, some plans needed modification.

Potential protestors were also engaged in planning in advance of the summit.

== Previous summits in Toronto ==
In June 1988, Canada had been the host for the 14th G7 summit in Toronto . The venue for the meetings of the international leaders was the Metro Toronto Convention Centre in central part of the city. The RCMP coordinated security and protective operations.

== Sherpas ==
During the preliminary preparatory process which takes place in advance of a G8 summit, the leader of a G8 host nation conventionally invites representatives from the other G8 participants to send representatives known as "sherpas" to develop the agenda topics and other matters.

== Security ==
Logo of the Integrated Security Unit for the 2010 summits

The decision to hold the international meeting in central Toronto expanded the scope of the Integrated Security Unit which planned and established coordinated security operations. Aspects of security planning encompass accreditation, mobilization and training, tactical emergency response, sites and venues security, community relations and communications security. The potential significance which could attend flaws in these plans was underscored in media coverage of a firebombing in Ottawa in May and a minor protest "event" in Toronto mid-June 2010

=== Sites and venues security ===
Security planning was designed to ensure that the summit agenda would remain a primary focus of the attendees' discussions. Security zones were split up into concentric rings with the summit site at the center.

The innermost security zone was handled by the Royal Canadian Mounted Police (RCMP) because the RCMP have jurisdiction over the security of Internationally Protected Persons (IPP)s and other dignitaries.

Oversight of the second ring outside the innermost was handled by the Toronto Police Service (TPS). Another ring was under the management of the Ontario Provincial Police (OPP).

In addition, the Canadian Forces (CF) support for the ISU draws on unique military resources and capabilities which are provided by the army, navy and air force. This was known as Operation Cadence. The North American Aerospace Defense Command (NORAD) coordinated decision-making about establishing no-fly zones during the summits.

Pedestrian screening

The contract for pedestrian security screening at the G8 and G20 summits was awarded to Contemporary Security Canada, headquartered in British Columbia. The screeners were selected from a diverse group of various ethnicities and cultures. Some were experienced security staff and retired police, fire and military personnel. All worked under RCMP supervision.

=== Community relations ===
Canadian law ensures that protesters have the right to be seen and heard, which means that visiting leaders cannot be shielded from lawful protests. Canadian officials determined that this means arrangements must be made so that protesters will be visible to those participating in the summit. Information about the plans of anti-summit protest groups was readily accessible online.

The G20 ISU planning included explicit actions designed to ensure that Charter guaranteed rights and freedoms are upheld.

In advance of the summit, Toronto Police Chief Bill Blair explained that the officers would be on Toronto streets in order to facilitate the peaceful protests that were bound to take place. He also explained his view that it was the police responsibility in a democracy to protect the rights of (peaceful) protesters.

== Emergency response ==
Ontario's provincial planning was tweaked to provide emergency response arrangements which could address the potential hazards affecting public safety in the summit area.

Hospitals anticipated a potential for urgent admissions among protestors; and the G20 tested the hospitals' ability to prepare for an emergency that doesn't have a fixed date. Simulated drills in advance of the summit were designed to test readiness.

== Post-summit review of preparations ==
The complex command structure designed for the G20 caused constant consultations between Toronto Police and the federally led Integrated Security Unit based in Barrie. A post-summit civilian review of the multi-jurisdictional policing model was created. A central goal of the investigation is to identify perceived structural problems.

- "There are legitimate public policy questions .... Who was the Integrated Security Unit reporting to? . . . Who's in charge? Are they reporting to the prime minister? Because that's ultimately the oversight of the RCMP. Are they reporting to the premier? Because that's ultimately the oversight of the OPP. The premier and the prime minister, did they agree on a security plan? How did that all work?" — David Miller, Mayor of Toronto
- "There is little that an internal policy review conducted by the Toronto Police can do to get to the bottom of concerns that involved all branches of the G20 Integrated Security Unit .... The summit saw the largest mass arrests in Canadian history, granting of questionable new police powers and vast numbers of reports of illegal searches, inadequate detention facilities and denial of the right to counsel. Concerns of this scope and scale go far beyond the capacity of an internal complaints process and call out for a public inquiry." — British Columbia Civil Liberties Association

== See also ==
- 2010 G20 Toronto summit
- 2010 G20 Toronto summit protests
- 2010 G20 Seoul summit preparations
- List of G20 summits
