= 2011 Incheon fishing incident =

The 2011 Incheon fishing incident occurred on December 12, 2011, at the island Socheongdo in Incheon, South Korea. The incident involved a Chinese fisherman who was said by the South Koreans to be fishing illegally. During the confrontation two Incheon coast guardsmen were stabbed.

== Background ==
Japan's coast guard, China's fisheries law enforcement command, Malaysia's maritime enforcement agency and South Korea's coast guard have all been employed to enforce perceived sovereign rights over disputed waters. At times, their actions have come into conflict with assets from extraregional states over perceived sovereignty violations. In this case, it would be the Incheon Fishing incident. The expansion of maritime paramilitary forces and their continued deployment to disputed areas also highlights the failure to resolve territorial disputes politically. They still consist of an armed presence, even if it is a less conspicuous one, in contested waters. Given the lower-calibre weaponry of such forces and the perception that the use of deadly force in pursuit of law and order is more legitimate than in the pursuit of politics, there is a lower threshold for violence. Because of the territorial technicalities when it comes to bodies of water, this area has been known for high conflict due to multiple fishing incidents outside of the 2011 Incheon Fishing Incident. East Asia is beset by maritime disputes and the various paramilitary agencies have been involved in incidents, occasionally violent, that have created ill will. The worst-case scenario in which an incident at sea involving paramilitaries becomes a diplomatic issue and worsens relations to the point of conflict may not seem likely. The incidents themselves remain relatively minor. It is the potential for such incidents to inflame existing tensions or serve as pretexts that should be the concern. This is concerning because continued testing of the waters regarding territory may lead to deteriorating relations, with unforeseen consequences.

== Incident ==
At 87 km southwest of Socheng Island and 120 miles west of Incheon near the border with North Korea, nine Chinese crew men were violently resisting South Korean coast guardsmen. The Chinese 66-ton boat was being seized by South Korean officials due to illegal fishing activity. During this conflict, another Chinese ship rammed into the South Korean coast guard ship resulting in the rebellion of the Chinese fishermen on both ships. The captain of the Chinese boat then stabbed two Incheon-based coast guardsmen with a piece of glass from a shattered cabin window. 41-year-old Lee Cheong-ho was stabbed in the ribs and died en route to a hospital in Incheon via helicopter. The Chinese captain, who suffered a minor injury during the clash, was under arrest. The second South Korean coast guardsmen Lee Nan-hoon was stabbed in the abdomen, but his condition was not critical.

== Aftermath ==
The South Korean coast guard seized the Chinese ships and its crew detaining them in Incheon, a port city west of Seoul.In Seoul, Minister of Foreign Affairs Park Suk-hwan summoned the Chinese ambassador, Zhang Xinsen (张鑫森) make a statement about illegal fishing and the fisherman's use of violence. On December 8, Zhang just said the government is "increasing education" for its fishermen. Foreign Ministry spokesman Liu Weimin mentioned that China was working to reduce illegal fishing by instructing Chinese fishermen about the law and at times physically restricting their boats from crossing into South Korean waters. Liu Weimin also expressed hope that South Korea will fully protect the legitimate rights and interests of Chinese fishermen and provide humanitarian treatment.

== See also ==
- 2011 Gyeongryeolbi island fishing incident
- 2010 Eocheong boat collision incident
