= Kim Hyung-shik =

South Korean politician (born 1970)

- 김형식

Member of the Seoul Metropolitan Council
- In office 1 July 2010 – 19 August 2015
- Constituency: Gangseo 2nd
- Succeeded by: Kim Kyung-ja

Personal details
- Born: 19 January 1970 (age 56) Seocheon, South Chungcheong, South Korea
- Party: Independent
- Other political affiliations: Uri Party (2003–2007); United New Democratic Party (2007–2008); United Democratic Party (2008); Democratic Party (2008–2011); Democratic Unionist Party (2011–2013); Democratic Party (2013–2014); New Politics Alliance for Democracy (2014)
- Education: Hanshin University
- Occupation: Activist, politician

Korean name
- Hangul: 김형식
- RR: Gim Hyeongsik
- MR: Kim Hyŏngsik

Kim Hyung-shik (Korean: 김형식, born 19 January 1970) is a South Korean activist, politician and criminal. He was a member of the Seoul Metropolitan Council for Gangseo 2nd constituency from 2010 to 2015. In 2014, he was arrested for aiding and abetting a murder.

== Career ==
Kim earned a bachelor's degree in philosophy at Hanshin University, where he was the President of its Student Council. As a notable 386 activist, he served as an aide for a former MP Shin Ki-nam, as well as a deputy spokesman of the Uri Party. At the 2006 local elections, he ran as a member of the Seoul Metropolitan Council for Gangseo 1st constituency but lost. In 2010, he changed from 1st to 2nd constituency and was elected.

Kim used to help Roh Moo-hyun at the 2002 presidential election and also Park Won-soon at the 2011 by-election. After Park was elected as the Mayor of Seoul, Kim harshly criticised Park, though both were at the same party. Kim also became sensation when he attended with short pants into the council building.

== Murder case ==
On 3 March 2014, Song Seung-ho, a businessman was found dead at his own building in Naebalsan-dong, Seoul. Shortly after this, Paeng Yong-chan, who escaped to China, was suspected by police. After wanted by Interpol, Paeng was repatriated to South Korea and was subsequently arrested. On the other hand, during the investigation, Paeng explained that his murder was ordered by Kim Hyung-shik.

On 24 June, Kim was arrested by police, shortly after his re-election under the New Politics Alliance for Democracy (NPAD) banner. The next day, he immediately quit from the NPAD.

Hankook Ilbo reported that Kim borrowed around 500 million won (≒ 500 thousand USD) from Song between 2010 and 2011. When Kim refused to pay it back, Song threatened Kim to do so; otherwise Song would make Kim to lose in 2014. The media also added that Kim was afraid of it and decided to kill Song. Kim planned to use his long-time friend, Paeng, to launch his own "decision", but when Paeng was keep refusing, Kim gave a final warning to Paeng on 27 February and finally, Paeng killed Song.

The media also explained that Kim urged Paeng to commit suicide and Paeng also unsuccessfully tried his 4 attempts at lock-up. Nevertheless, Kim denied all of these and later, he kept silent.

On 27 October, Kim was sentenced to life imprisonment and 25 years for Paeng at the first trial. Kim subsequently lodged an appeal, but at the second trial, he was again sentenced to life in prison, compared to Paeng whose imprisonment was reduced to 20 years. "Please don't! I didn't do it!" he wailed and was forced to be brought out to the court. On 19 August 2015, at the final trial, the Supreme Court confirmed life imprisonment to Kim and his election as a Seoul Metropolitan Council member was officially annulled.

The invalidity of his election caused a by-election, held along with the general election. The Democratic Party of Korea (successor of the NPAD) decided to not put a candidate on responsibility of the case. In the end, Kim Kyung-ja of the People's Party (splinter of the NPAD) was elected.

== Personal life ==
Kim has an elder brother, who is a prosecutor and lawyer. It was reported that he was also involved in several crimes, including kidnapping a businessman. In 2007, he was sentenced 4 years of imprisonment for kidnapping owners (father-son relations) of a golf course.

== Election results ==
=== Local elections ===
Year	Constituency	Political party	Votes (%)	Remarks
2006	Gangseo 1st	Uri	14,485 (28.28%)	Defeated
2010	Gangseo 2nd	Democratic	33,649 (56.28%)	Won
2014	Gangseo 2nd	NPAD	36,336 (54.15%)	Won
