= 2011 Gyeongryeolbi island fishing incident =

Maritime incident in South Korea

The 2011 Gyeongryeolbi island fishing incident occurred on March 2, 2011, in Taean County, in South Chungcheong Do, South Korea, at 3 pm at 64 miles (103 km) southwest off Gyeongryeolbi island between People’s Republic of China fishing boats and the South Korea Coast Guard.

== Incident ==
Seven Chinese fishing boats were spotted by a patrol boat from the South Korea Coast Guard. Two of the 30 ton Chinese boats entered 7 miles (11 km) into the South Korea Exclusive Economic Zone illegally. Korean authorities used fire extinguishers to disperse the boats, then sent out two speedboats and seized two of the boats after a 10-minute chase.

When boarding the boat, violence broke out. The fisherman began swinging axes and hammers. The Korean officers fired 10 blanks and live shotgun ammunition. One of the shot penetrated hit left ankle of one Chinese fisherman. Two people were injured in total, including one Chinese fisherman and one Korean coast guard.

== Aftermath ==
The fisherman shot was sent to a hospital in Gunsan by helicopter. According to the Coast Guard, this was the first time shots were fired for illegal fishing in the Yellow Sea.

== See also ==
- 2010 Eocheong boat collision incident
- 2011 Incheon fishing incident
