= Busan Subway fire =

2014 disaster in South Korea

The Busan Subway fire refers to the fire that happened on July 16, 2014 in Busan, South Korea. The fire happened at the City Hall Station at 5:41 p.m. during which 5 people were injured and 400 more were evacuated. According to the Korean police, the fire happened due to faulty wiring which linked air conditioner to the external power supply. The Metro began operating again as normal by 6:55 p.m.
