= Gageo Reef =

Rock reef in the Yellow Sea

Coordinates: 34°00′41″N 124°53′19″E

Gageo Reef (Korean: 가거초; RR: Gageocho) or Rixiang Reef (Chinese: 日向礁; pinyin: Rìxiàng Jiāo) is an uninhabited submerged rock 7.8 metres below sea level (at low tide) located in the Yellow Sea.

== History ==
The Japanese battleship Hyūga (日向) hit this undersea rock on March 29, 1927. Japanese navy then researched the surrounding area and found the rock and named it as Hyūga shou, meaning Hyuga reef, after the ship. Chinese name Rìxiàng Jiāo, meaning Rixiang reef, is the Chinese pronunciation of its Japanese name. On December 19, 2007, Korean side changed the name to Gageo Reef, named after the nearby island. As of 2012, there is a Korean marine research station located at the reef.

== Dispute ==
According to the United Nations Convention on the Law of the Sea, a submerged reef can not be claimed as territory by any country. However, China and South Korea dispute which is entitled to claim it as part of the Exclusive Economic Zone (EEZ).

== See also ==
- Socotra Rock
