= List of Gaon Digital Chart number ones of 2015 =

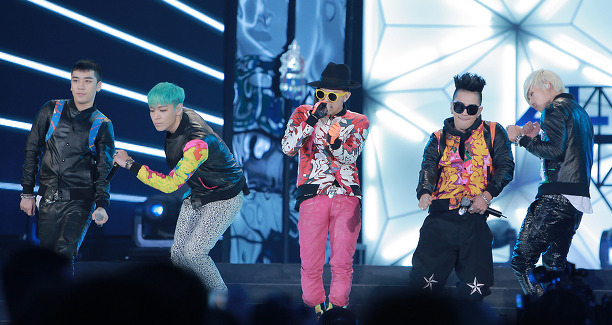
Big Bang claimed the year's best-performing single with "Bang Bang Bang"; their three other singles also topped the monthly charts for three months.

The Gaon Digital Chart, part of Gaon Music Chart, is a chart that ranks the best-performing songs in South Korea. The data is collected by the Korea Music Content Association. It consists of weekly (listed from Sunday to Saturday), monthly and yearly charts. Below is a list of songs that topped the weekly and monthly charts. The Digital Chart ranks songs according to their performance on the Gaon Download, Streaming, and BGM charts.

== Weekly charts ==
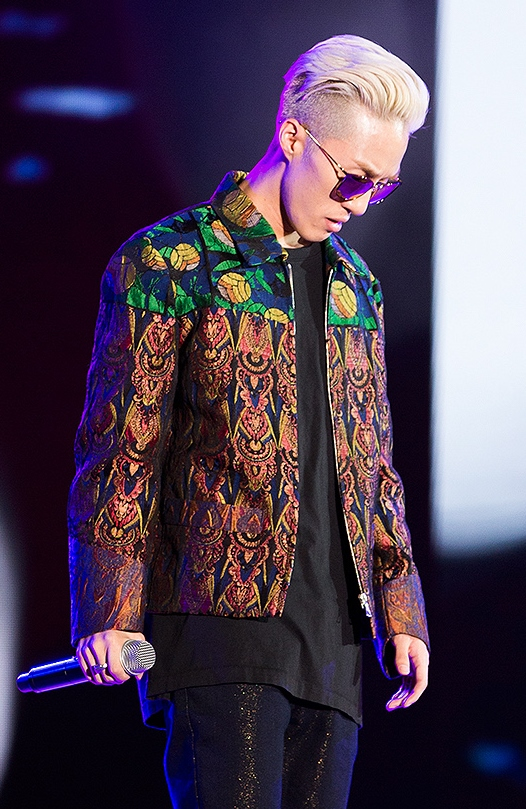
Zion.T topped the weekly chart with five songs – both as lead and featured artist.

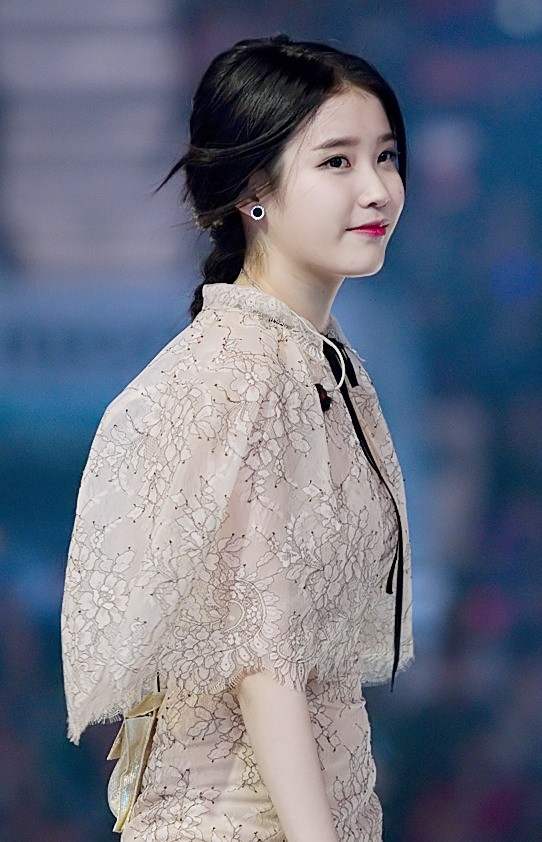
IU scored three weekly number-one songs.

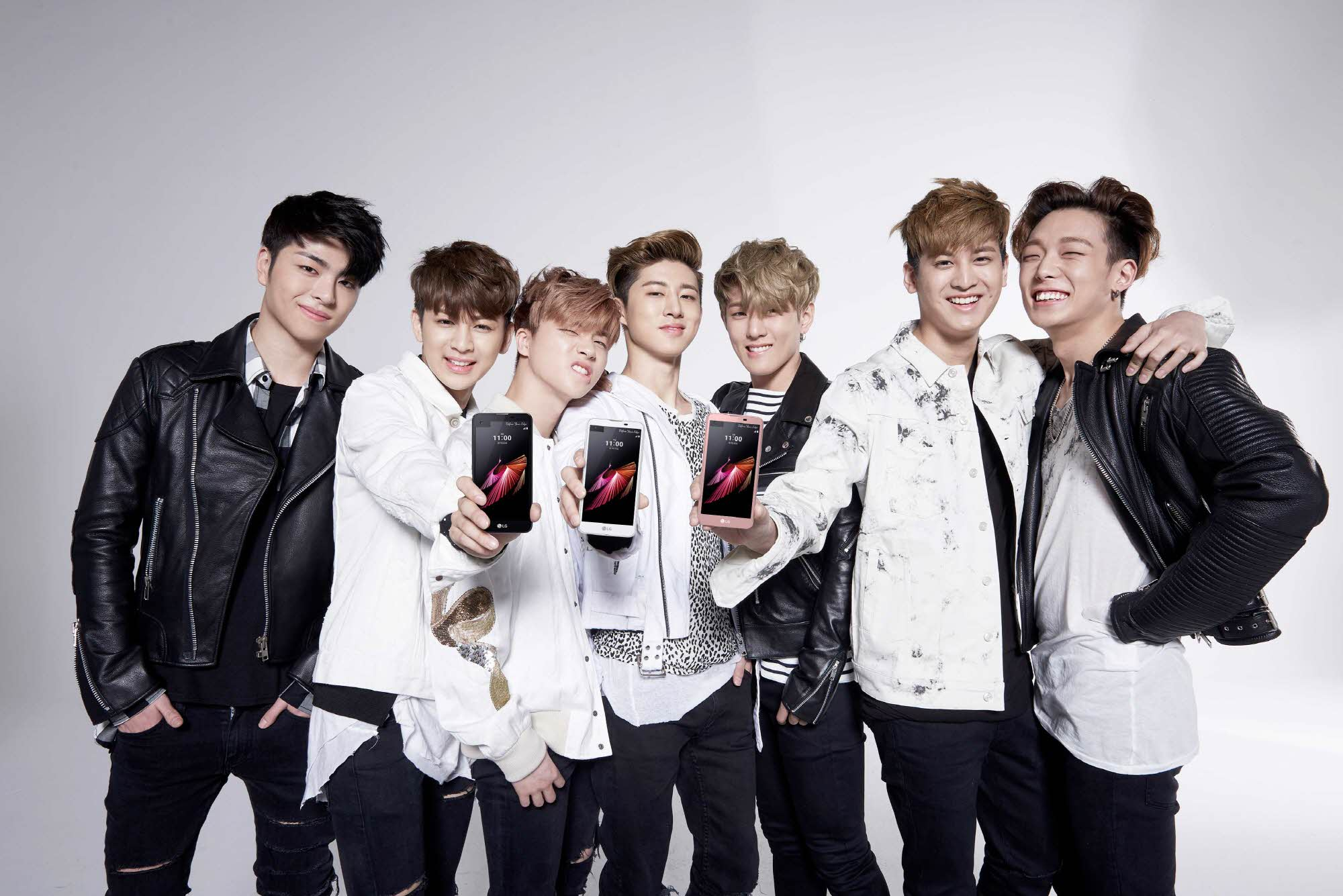
iKon earned two number-one singles, including their debut single "My Type".

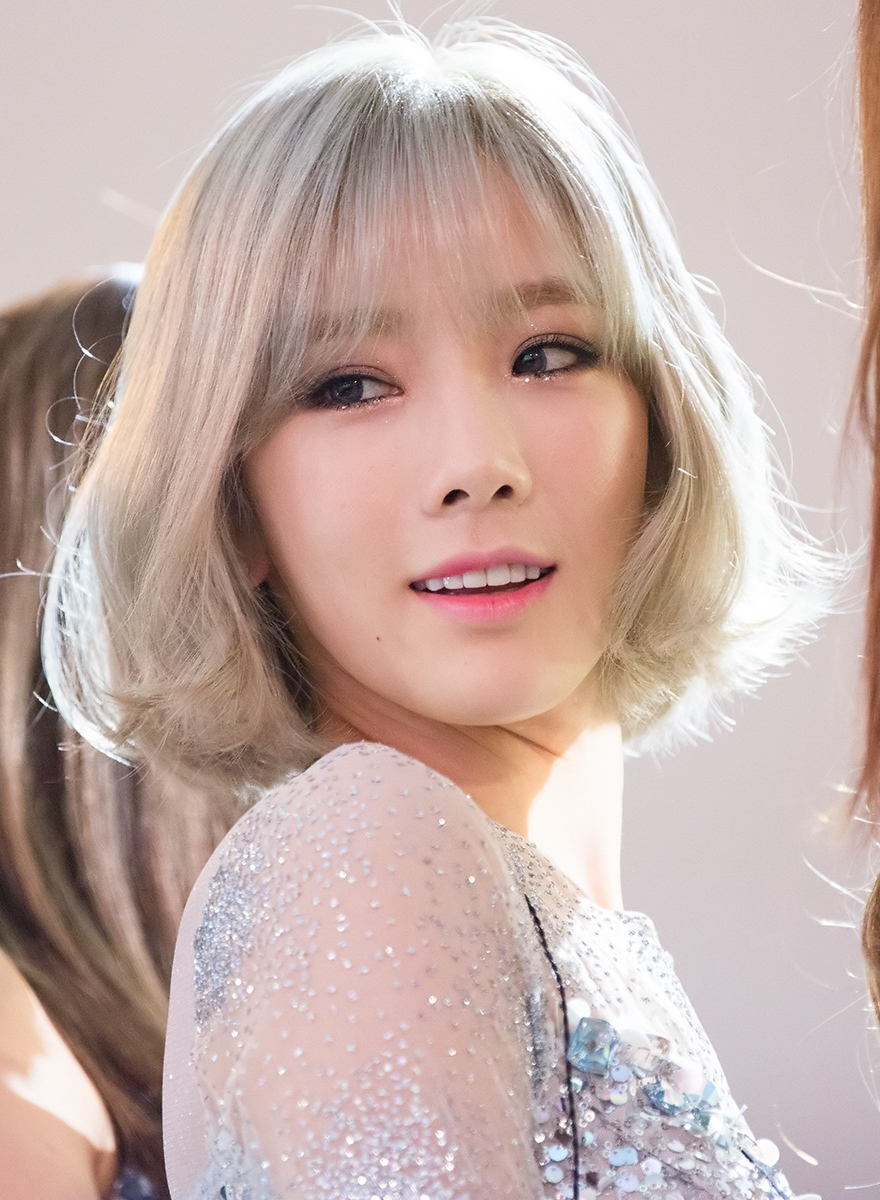
Taeyeon charted at number one with her debut single "I"; her concurrent group Girls' Generation's single "Party" also made it to the top spot.

Key
†	Indicates best-performing single of 2015

Source: Gaon Digital Chart
Week end date	Song	Artist(s)
January 3	"Up & Down" (위아래)	EXID
January 10	"Déjà-Boo" (데자-부)	Jonghyun featuring Zion.T
January 17	"Fire" (화)	Mad Clown featuring Jinsil of Mad Soul Child
January 24	"I Have To Forget You" (슬픔 속에 그댈 지워야만 해)	Jeong Seung-hwan and Park Yoon-ha
January 31	"Cry Again" (또 운다 또)	Davichi
February 7	"Just" (그냥)	Zion.T and Crush
February 14	"You from the Same Time" (같은 시간 속의 너)	Naul
February 21	"You from the Same Time" (같은 시간 속의 너)	Naul
February 28	"You from the Same Time" (같은 시간 속의 너)	Naul
March 7	"Love Mash" (사랑범벅)	MC Mong featuring Chancellor
March 14	"Love Mash" (사랑범벅)	MC Mong featuring Chancellor
March 21	"Snow of April" (사월의 눈)	Huh Gak
March 28	"Puss"	Jimin with Iron
April 4	"Only You" (다른 남자 말고 너)	Miss A
April 11	"Only You" (다른 남자 말고 너)	Miss A
April 18	"Who's Your Mama?" (어머님이 누구니)	Park Jin-young featuring Jessi
April 25	"Who's Your Mama?" (어머님이 누구니)	Park Jin-young featuring Jessi
May 2	"Loser"	Big Bang
May 9	"Loser"	Big Bang
May 16	"Loser"	Big Bang
May 23	"Heart" (마음)	IU
May 30	"View"	Shinee
June 6	"Bang Bang Bang" (뱅뱅뱅) †	Big Bang
June 13	"Love Me Right"	Exo
June 20	"Shouldn't Have" (이럴거면 그러지말지)	Baek A-yeon featuring Young K
June 27	"Shake It"	Sistar
July 4	"If You"	Big Bang
July 11	"Party"	Girls' Generation
July 18	"Come and Goes" (와리가리)	hyukoh
July 25	"Yanghwa BRDG" (양화대교)	Zion.T
August 1	"Wi Ing Wi Ing" (위잉위잉)	hyukoh
August 8	"Let's Not Fall In Love" (우리 사랑하지 말아요)	BigBang
August 15	"Let's Not Fall In Love" (우리 사랑하지 말아요)	BigBang
August 22	"Oppa's Car" (오빠차)	Incredivle, Tablo, and Jinusean
August 29	"Leon" (레옹)	Park Myung-soo and IU
September 5	"Leon" (레옹)	Park Myung-soo and IU
September 12	"Leon" (레옹)	Park Myung-soo and IU
September 19	"My Type" (취향저격)	iKON
September 26	"Get Some Air" (바람이나 좀 쐐)	Gary featuring Miwoo
October 3	"Love Again" (또 다시 사랑)	Im Chang-jung
October 10	"I"	Taeyeon featuring Verbal Jint
October 17	"No Make Up"	Zion.T
October 24	"Twenty-three" (스물셋)	IU
October 31	"Twenty-three" (스물셋)	IU
November 7	"Boys and Girls"	Zico featuring Babylon
November 14	"Let's Hug" (안아보자)	4Men
November 21	"Apology" (지못미)	iKON
November 28	"A Little Girl" (소녀)	Oh Hyuk
December 5	"Daddy"	Psy featuring CL
December 12	"Eureka"	Zico featuring Zion.T
December 19	"This Is Love" (사랑이 맞을거야)	Yoon Mi-rae
December 26	"Again" (다시)	Turbo

== Monthly charts ==
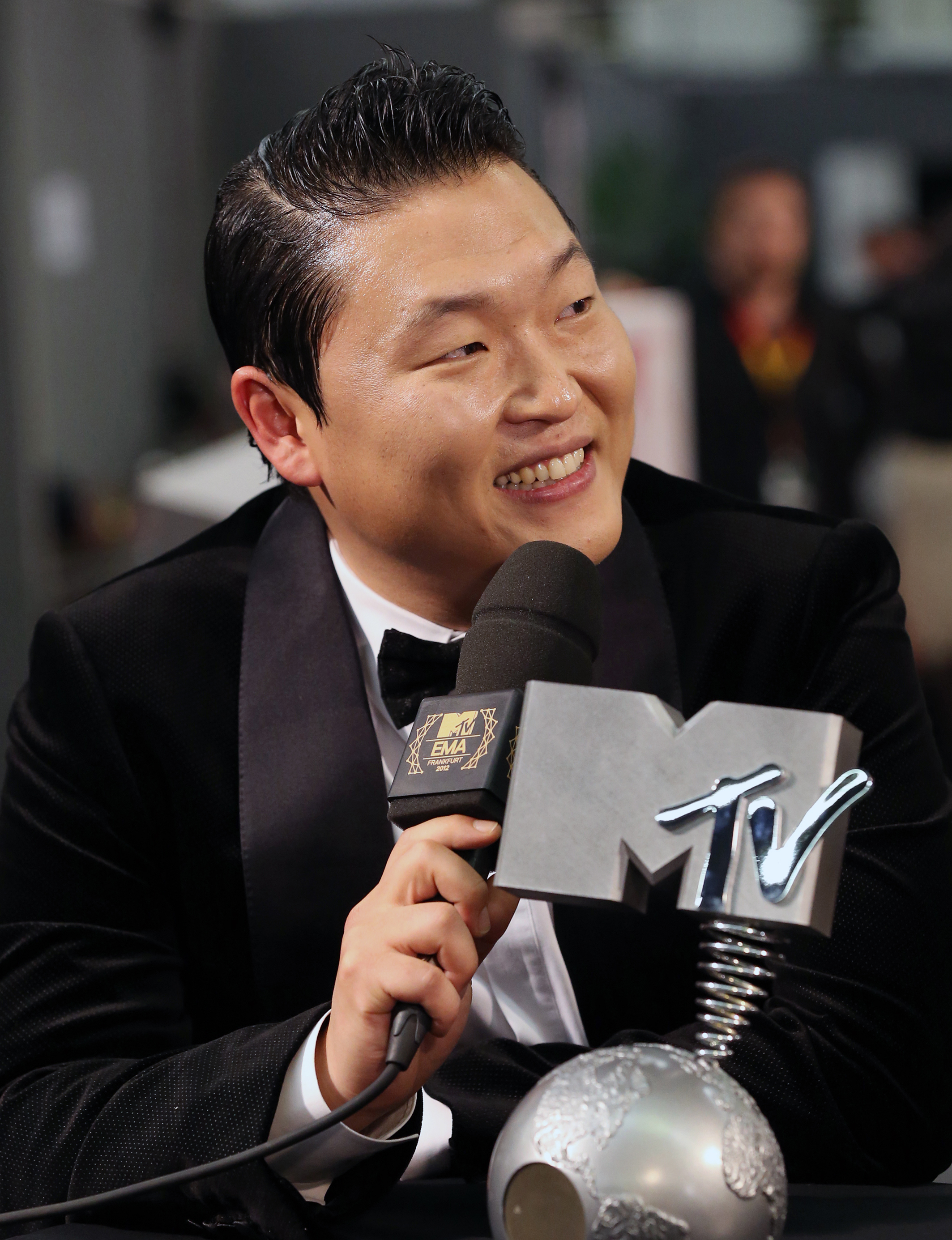
Psy earned a monthly number one with "Daddy".

Month	Song	Artist	Ref.
January	"Fire" (화)	Mad Clown featuring Jinsil of Mad Soul Child	
February	"You from the Same Time" (같은 시간 속의 너)	Naul	
March	"Love Mash" (사랑 범벅)	MC Mong featuring Chancellor	
April	"Only You" (다른 남자 말고 너)	Miss A	
May	"Loser"	BigBang	
June	"Bang Bang Bang" (뱅뱅뱅) †	BigBang	
July	"If You"	BigBang	
August	"Let's Not Fall In Love" (우리 사랑하지 말아요)	BigBang	
September	"Leon" (레옹)	Park Myung-soo and IU	
October	"I"	Taeyeon featuring Verbal Jint	
November	"Boys and Girls"	Zico featuring Babylon	
December	"Daddy"	Psy featuring CL	
