= Brawl Busters =

2011 video game

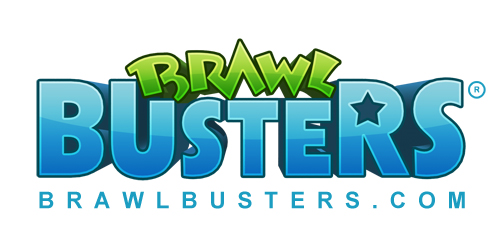
- Developer: SkeinGlobe
- Publishers: Rock Hippo Productions Ltd. & Weezor Inc.
- Platform: Microsoft Windows
- Release: December 15, 2011
- Genre: Action
- Modes: Multiplayer, Single-player

Brawl Busters was a free-to-play Online Multiplayer Action video game developed by Korean developer, SkeinGlobe, and published by Toronto-based publisher, Rock Hippo Productions, for the PC. The game was officially released on December 15, 2011, and the servers were closed on September 4, 2013.

== Overview ==
Brawl Busters, "formerly known as Project Plan B", is an action brawler that featured competitive and co-operative battle modes all in a third person view. "With its simple and intuitive controls, this easy to pick up and play game makes team strategy a must as players battle against each other or team up against computer controlled enemies". Brawl Busters also features a tutorial, various missions, leaderboards and stats tracking.

The game has received positive feedback since its initial announcement. "Regular updates have been flowing to the game from the developers in the form of more game modes and additional maps."

== Lessons ==
Rock Hippo Productions had released a series of Brawl Busters lessons to familiarize players with the game. The initial lessons showcased the five character classes. More lessons were planned in future updates, but they were never released.

== Character Classes ==
Brawl Busters features five different character classes, called Busters, including the Firefighter, the Rocker, the Boxer, the Blitzer, and the Slugger. The game offers seven maps and a wide variety of character customization options.

=== Firefighter ===
Firefighter handles a fire hose to spray nearby opponents with a powerful blast of water. Slow-moving firefighters have a high HP rating and their secondary attack has the longest range in the game. Their special attack creates a temporary defensive barrier.

=== Rocker ===
Rockers have a high movement rating and are great all-around combatants. They can either swing their guitar for deadly combos, or strike stunning musical chords for their secondary attack. The rocker's area of effect special attack clears out opponents in a flash.

=== Boxer ===
Boxers are the fastest busters but also have the lowest HP rating. They use boxing gloves to throw powerful punches or charge at opponents fist-first as their secondary attack. The special attack is a wind-up punch which launches flaming gloves damaging opponents in front of a boxer.

=== Blitzer ===
Blitzers, with the highest HP rating, are great at fighting multiple enemies. Armed with the football, they tackle their way through opponents or perform a touchdown move as the secondary attack. The special attack lunges them forward in a spin-move followed by a powerful slam.

=== Slugger ===
Wielding a baseball bat, sluggers are effective long-range fighters. They can either swing wildly at their enemies or launch deadly guided baseballs as their secondary attack. A slugger's special attack, one of the strongest in the game, drives a super-charged baseball at the enemy team.

== Team and Versus Modes ==
Brawl Busters offers a Team and Versus Mode, which as of the 16th update was expanded to up to 16-player brawls.

== See also ==
- MicroVolts - Another online multiplayer game by Rock Hippo Productions.
- Team Fortress 2 - Another class based team multiplayer game.
