= Droughts in Korea =

Drought in Korea is similar to that of other portions of the globe.

== Events ==
=== 2010s ===
A drought beginning in June 2015 affected both South and North Korea. The amount of rain that year was in places less than half of average, following a dry year in 2014. On 19 June, the water level in the Soyang Dam was 152.24 metres (499.5 ft)—the lowest recorded water level since its creation on 24 June 1978, when the water level was 151.93 metres (498.5 ft)—and the Soyang Lake completely evaporated. North Korea was also affected by extreme drought with the United Nations estimating approximately US$110 million of support would be needed.

Precipitation in Chuncheon
Year	Precipitation (mm)
Average	
2017	
2016	
2015	
2014	
2013	
2012	
2011	
2010	
2009	
2008	
2007	
2006	
2005	
2004	
2003	
2002	
2001	
2000	
1999	
1998	
1997	
1996	
1995	
1994	
1993	
1992	
1991	
1990	
1989	
1988	
1987	
1986	
1985	
1984	
1983	
1982	
1981	
1980	
1979	
1978	
1977	
1976	
1975	
1974	
1973	
Average	

== See also ==
- El Niño
- Effects of global warming § Water resources
