= 2013 in South Korea =

- Centuries: 20th; 21st
- Decades: 1990s; 2000s; 2010s; 2020s; 2030s
- See also: Other events of 2013; Years in South Korea; Timeline of Korean history 2013 in North Korea

Events in the year 2013 in South Korea.

== Incumbents ==
- President
  - Lee Myung-bak (2008-2013)
  - Park Geun-hye (2013-2017)
- Prime Minister
  - Kim Hwang-sik (2010-2013)
  - Jung Hong-won (2013–2015)

=== Governors ===
- Gyeonggi: Kim Moon-soo
- Gangwon: Choi Moon-soon
- North Chungcheong: Lee Si-jong
- South Chungcheong: An Hee-jung
- North Jeolla: Kim Wan-ju
- South Jeolla: Park Jun-young
- North Gyeongsang: Kim Kwan-yong
- South Gyeongsang: Hong Joon-pyo
- Jeju: Woo Geun-min

== Events ==
=== January ===
- 5 January – Saemaeul-ho Push-pull car was retired after 25 years in operation.
- 30 January – South Korea successfully launches its first satellite from domestic soil, using the Naro-1 rocket.

=== February ===
- 22 February – An appellate court sentences Kim Myeong-soo to six months’ imprisonment, with a two year suspension, under the National Security Law.

=== March ===
- 20 March – 2013 South Korea cyberattack

=== May ===
- 5 May – Namdaemun Gate reopens
- 28 May – The government suspends two nuclear reactors, and extends the shutdown of a third, after discovering safety cables supplied with forged certificates.

=== June ===
- 13 June – BTS (Bangtan Sonyeondan) debuted."No More Dream" is the song that was first staged by Bangtan boys.

=== July ===
- 21 July – The Labor Party is founded.

=== August ===
- 29 August – The Busan International Comedy Festival is founded.
- 2013 South Korean sabotage plot
- The Arbeit Workers Union is founded.

=== September ===
- 16 September – North and South Korea agree to reopen the Kaesong Industrial Complex, and to restore a cross-border hotline.

=== November ===
- 21 November – Park Jeong-geun is sentenced to 10 months’ imprisonment, with a two year suspension, under the National Security Law.

== Films ==
- 18th Busan International Film Festival
- 50th Grand Bell Awards
- 34th Blue Dragon Film Awards

== Music ==
- List of number-one hits of 2013
- List of Gaon Album Chart number ones of 2013
- List of number-one Streaming Songs of 2013
- 2013 Mnet Asian Music Awards

== Television ==
- 2013 KBS Drama Awards
- 2013 SBS Drama Awards
- 2013 MBC Drama Awards
- 6th Korea Drama Awards

== Sport ==
- 2013 in South Korean football
- 2013 Korea Open
- 2013 Korea Professional Baseball season
- 2013 Korean Series
- 2013 Korea Open Grand Prix Gold
- 2013 Korean Grand Prix
- 2013 3 Hours of Inje

== Deaths ==
- Rottyful Sky (age 25), singer and actress, October 8
