= Lim Soo-hyeok =

South Korean baseball player

- Pitcher
- Born: June 17, 1969; Seoul, South Korea
- Died: February 7, 2010 (aged 40); Seoul, South Korea
- Batted: Right Threw: Right

KBO debut
- 1994, for the Lotte Giants

Last appearance
- April 18, 2000, for the Lotte Giants

Teams
- Sangmu Phoenix (1992–1993); Lotte Giants (1994–2000)

Lim Soo-Hyeok (Korean: 임수혁; Hanja: 任秀赫, June 17, 1969 – February 7, 2010) was a baseball catcher to the Lotte Giants.

== Career ==
In 1994, Lim began to start baseball and a promising player with a lot of potential. In his rookie season, Lim batted .250 in 29 games, and .247 with 15 home runs. In 1996, Lim produced .311 with 11 home runs and 76 RBI. During his seven-year career, he began to boost a career total of 345 hits, 47 home runs, and .257 RBI with a .266 RBI.

== Personal life ==
In April 2000, Lim suddenly collapsed at the second base against the LG Twins at the Jamsil Stadium in southern Seoul. Reports said that Lim collapsed due to a heart arrhythmia or irregular heartbeat and failed to receive cardiopulmonary resuscitation on time. Although an emergency medical service vehicle arrived and transported Lim to a hospital, the brain damage he received from the incident was said to have resulted largely from the lack of first aid soon after Lim collapsed at the stadium. Poor first aid and the ensuing brain damage resulting from lack of oxygen to the brain meant there wasn't much the doctors at the hospital could do to help Lim once he was brought to the hospital. The former baseball player went on to spend the next decade in a vegetative state.

His family later sued the Lotte Giants and LG Twins in April 2003 for 800 million.

== Death ==
On February 7, 2010, Lim Soo-Hyeok died from a cardiac dysrhythmia when he was taken into Kangdong Sacred Heart Hospital in eastern Seoul.
