= 2010 G20 Seoul summit preparations =

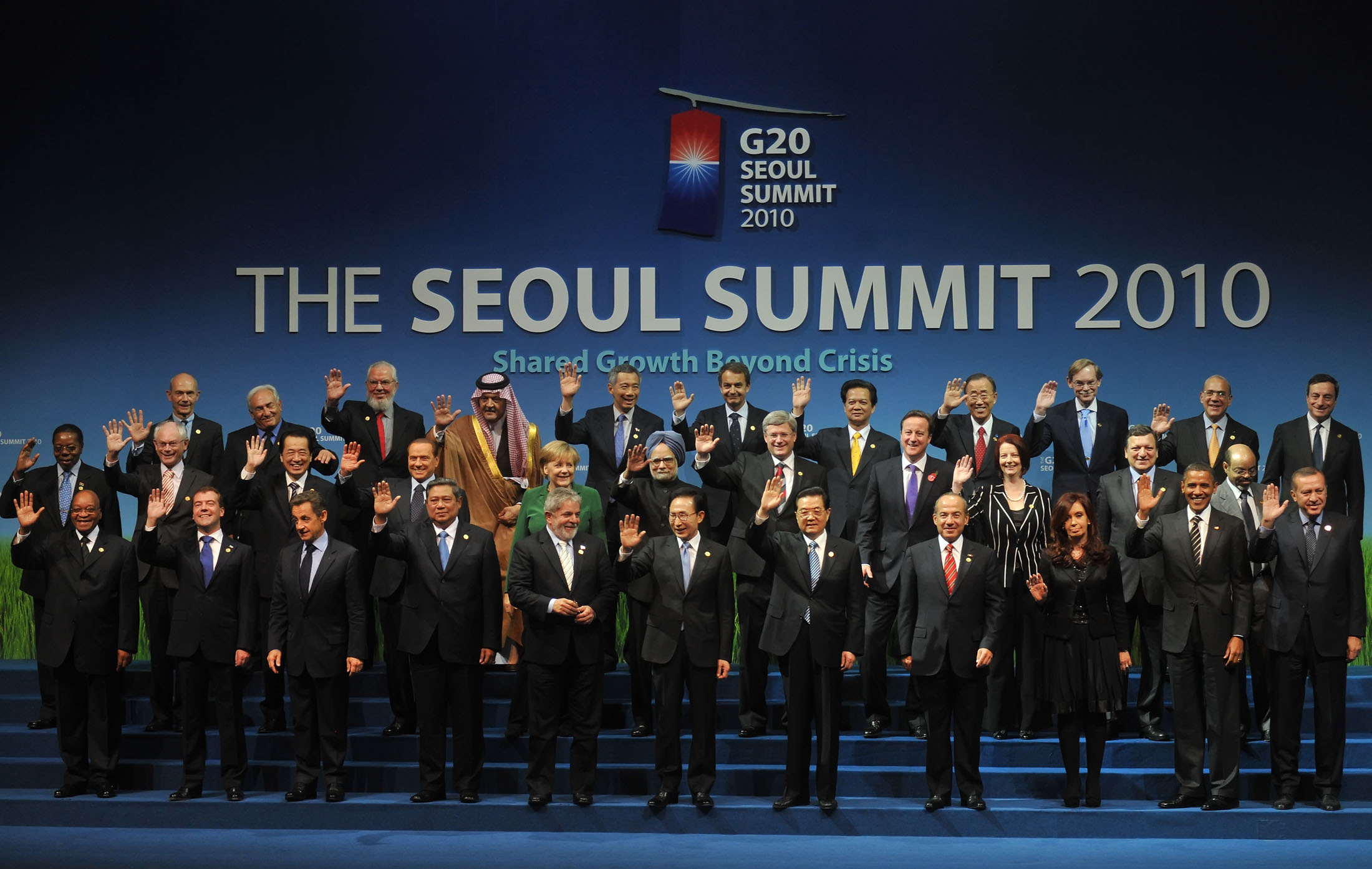
World leaders at the 2010 G20 Seoul summit

The 2010 G20 Seoul summit preparations encompass all the work which preceded the 2010 G20 Seoul summit.

== Multiple agendas ==
The G20 summit was not construed as having a global governance role, but primarily in helping to establish a new agenda to respond to new challenges.

The government of Korea was reported as wanting to use the summit as a promotional opportunity, as happened with the 1988 Olympic Games and 2002 World Cup.

The pre-planning of others was less explicit, for example North Korea

Planning for the summit encompasses nested aspects of the event, e.g.,

- Developing an understanding of each country's perspective and ensuring that it is reflected in the agenda
- Preparing and coordinating the venue, facilities and staff required
- Organizing arrivals, departures and accommodations
- Coordination with international organizations, academia, research centers, NGOs, media, government departments, and local governments
- Media Center, including support for members of the press

=== Timeline ===
In November, sherpas representing the summit participants will have preparatory meetings to put the finishing touches on summit planning.

Pre-summit events were scheduled in an orderly timeline as follows:

- November 11–12 (Seoul): G20 summit
- November 10–11 (Seoul): Business summit scheduled on the periphery of the G20 Summit. Planners anticipate that chief executives of the top 20 business firms of the G20 member nations will attend.
- October 22–23 (Gwangju): G20 Finance Ministers' and Central Bank Governors' Meeting
- September 4–5 (Gyeongju): G20 Deputies' Meeting
- July — Former Ghanaian President John Agyekum Kufuor attended the preparatory meeting in Korea as the representative of the Club of Madrid, which is an organization of former democratically elected heads of state.

=== Sherpas ===
Representatives or "sherpas" from each attending nation prepared the groundwork for discussions during the G20 summit. They met in Inchon in October to discuss the need for "civil dialogue."

=== Events for spouses ===
Plans were developed for the wives of leaders attending the conference. Michelle Obama, wife of the President of the United States, and Carla Bruni, wife of the President of France, announced in early November that they would not be able to participate.

== Site construction ==
In conjunction with the summit, three artificial islands and venues are being built at a cost of 96.4 billion won. The international leaders will meet on islands in the midst of the Han River between the Banpo and Dongjak bridges in Seoul.

The islands will be connected via a secured bridge and located between the Banpo Bridge and Dongjak Bridge. The three artificial islands will be home to the main convention hall with restaurants and a park. Initial work is expected to be completed by September.

== Website, logo, and slogan ==
The logo reflects the summit slogan — "with people to the world; with the world to the future"

The initial publicly visible preparatory steps were in the creation of a website. After four months of test runs, the online venue became a platform for announcing the choice of a summit logo, which was chosen out of 2,279 entries in an open contest. The Korean lantern logo represents light shining in the dark and also the light which welcomes guests. This forward-looking theme is repeated in the official Korean slogan — "with people to the world; with the world to the future." The logo incorporates an image of the sun rising over the sea, and the 20 rays coming from the center represent the 20 members of the meeting.

== Security ==
The South Korean People National Police Agency (NPA) created a special police unit as part of its efforts to enhance security at the summit. Th NPA-lead security committee will coordinate the work of 25 government-related agencies, including:

- Presidential Security Service
- National Intelligence Service
- Ministry of National Defense
- National Emergency Management Agency

This security will limit access some parts of the summit islands. The waters of the Han River will be closely monitored.

World leaders attending this summit will stay at various hotels around Seoul, but, for security reasons, the press have been discouraged from writing about this aspect of summit preparations.

== See also ==
- 2010 G20 Seoul summit
- 2010 G20 Toronto summit preparations
- List of G20 summits
- United Nations Research Institute for Social Development
