= 2015 Sejong and Hwaseong shootings =

Mass shootings in South Korea

2015 Hwaseong shooting
- Location: Hwaseong City, Gyeonggi Province, South Korea
- Date: 25–27 February 2015
- Attack type: Spree shooting, mass murder, murder-suicide
- Weapon: Firearms
- Deaths: 8 (including both perpetrators)
- Injuries: 2 (1 by gunfire)
- Perpetrator: Two unidentified men

The 2015 Sejong and Hwaseong shootings were two separate shooting incidents that occurred in South Korea on 25 and 27 February 2015 in the cities of Sejong and Hwaseong, respectively. After each shooting, the gunmen committed suicide.

Both incidents led South Korea to immediate adoption of GPS monitoring of firearms. Since the rarity of shooting incidents in South Korea are evident, they garner international news coverage; the two unrelated spree shootings were widely reported, as was the adoption of the gun control measure.

== Shootings ==
At 8 a.m. on 25 February (23:00 GMT Tuesday), in Sejong, South Korea's administrative capital, a gunman shot and killed three people at a convenience store, then committed suicide at another location. The three victims were the gunman's ex-girlfriend's father, brother, and current boyfriend. Keeping a gun in the home in South Korea is restricted; the shooter checked out two shotguns from a police precinct two hours before.

On 27 February, another shooting occurred in Hwaseong, Gyeonggi, South Korea, where an elderly man shot and killed three people—his brother, his sister-in-law, and a policeman—and injured another police officer before committing suicide. He had checked out a hunting rifle at a police station before driving to his brother's house. A niece of the gunman was injured jumping from a second-story window to escape.

The incident caused South Korea's Yonhap News Agency to criticize the nation's gun control regulations for hunting weapons, and led immediately to gun control regulation changes. On March 2, the first business day following the Friday incident, South Korea's National Emergency Management Agency, its National Police Agency, and the ruling Saenuri Party agreed to require GPS monitoring of guns in the nation.
