= List of 2015 box office number-one films in South Korea =

This is a list of films which placed number-one at the South Korean box office during 2015.

== Number-one films ==
Veteran became the highest grossing film of 2015.

#	Date	Film	Gross
1	January 4, 2015	Ode to My Father	$27,888,360
2	January 11, 2015	Ode to My Father	$18,152,202
3	January 18, 2015	Ode to My Father	$20,776,821
4	January 25, 2015	Gangnam Blues	$19,696,444
5	February 1, 2015	Gangnam Blues	$10,439,156
6	February 8, 2015	C'est Si Bon	$12,154,727
7	February 15, 2015	Detective K: Secret of the Lost Island	$15,463,353
8	February 22, 2015	Detective K: Secret of the Lost Island	$27,947,003
9	March 1, 2015	Kingsman: The Secret Service	$12,997,201
10	March 8, 2015	Kingsman: The Secret Service	$11,544,938
11	March 15, 2015	The Deal	$12,675,750
12	March 22, 2015	Whiplash	$11,454,184
13	March 29, 2015	Twenty	$12,333,580
14	April 5, 2015	Furious 7	$14,472,432
15	April 12, 2015	Furious 7	$10,219,469
16	April 19, 2015	Furious 7	$8,502,444
17	April 26, 2015	Avengers: Age of Ultron	$25,351,834
18	May 3, 2015	Avengers: Age of Ultron	$25,052,745
19	May 10, 2015	Avengers: Age of Ultron	$11,725,297
20	May 17, 2015	Mad Max: Fury Road	$15,376,958
21	May 24, 2015	Mad Max: Fury Road	$17,547,026
22	May 31, 2015	Mad Max: Fury Road	$13,983,504

== Highest-grossing films ==
Highest-grossing films of 2015 (by admissions)
Rank	Title	Country	Admissions	Domestic gross
1.	Veteran	South Korea	13,414,009	US$92.1 million
2.	Assassination	South Korea	12,705,700	US$86.3 million
3.	Avengers: Age of Ultron	United States	10,494,499	US$77.6 million
4.	Ode to My Father	South Korea	8,915,904	US$61.2 million
5.	Inside Men	South Korea	7,055,342	US$49.5 million
6.	The Throne	South Korea	6,246,851	US$42.8 million
7.	Kingsman: The Secret Service	United States; United Kingdom	6,129,681	US$44.1 million
8.	Mission: Impossible – Rogue Nation	United States	6,126,488	US$42.5 million
9.	Northern Limit Line	South Korea	6,043,784	US$39.9 million
10.	Jurassic World	United States	5,546,792	US$41.9 million

Highest-grossing domestic films of 2015 (by admissions)
Rank	Title	Admissions	Domestic gross
1.	Veteran	13,414,009	US$92.1 million
2.	Assassination	12,705,700	US$86.3 million
3.	Ode to My Father	8,915,904	US$61.2 million
4.	Inside Men	7,055,342	US$49.5 million
5.	The Throne	6,246,851	US$42.8 million
6.	Northern Limit Line	6,043,784	US$39.9 million
7.	The Priests	5,442,128	US$37.1 million
8.	The Himalayas	5,129,431	US$34.6 million
9.	Detective K: Secret of the Lost Island	3,872,015	US$26.7 million
10.	Twenty	3,044,811	US$20.6 million
