= 2011 South Korea blackout =

2011 power outage in South Korea

The 2011 South Korea Blackout was a power outage across South Korea on September 15, 2011.

== Responses ==
- President Lee Myung-bak made a remark how this power outage was an incident that "happens in third world countries". The Assembly leader of the opposition Democratic Party, Kim Jin-pyo, responded to his remark by criticizing Lee Myung-bak's third world approach of extensively hiring crony parachuted personnels.
- The Future Hope Alliance-affiliated politician, Song Yeong-seon (송영선), mentioned that a cyberattack from North Korea caused this nationwide blackout and later received negative online commentaries for being uncertainly judgmental.
- Choi Jung-gyeong, the head of the Ministry of Knowledge Economy, officially resigned due to this incident.
