= Balsan-dong =

Coordinates: 37.552°N 126.834°E

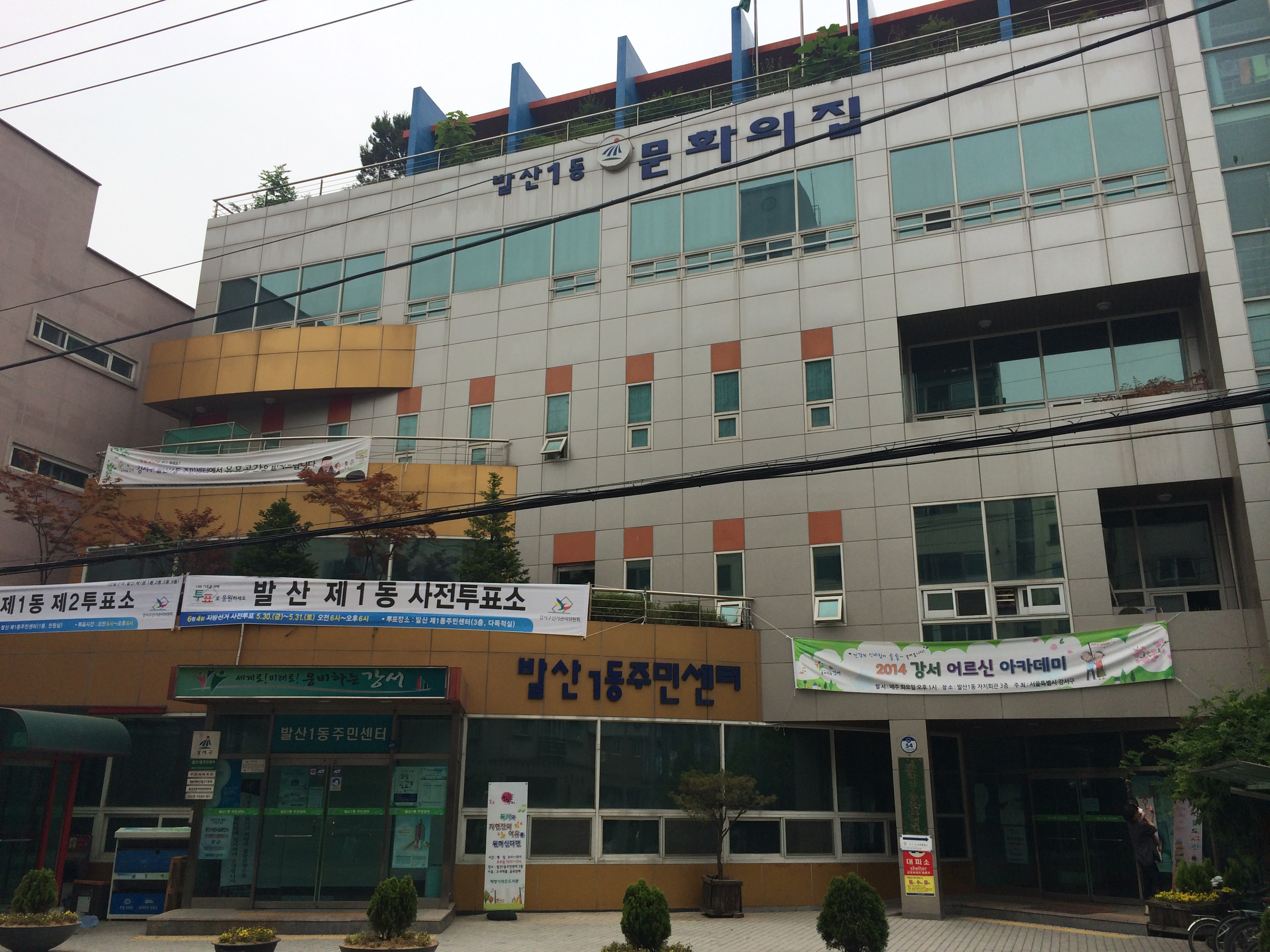
- Balsan 1-dong Community Service Center
- Interactive map of Balsan-dong
- Country: South Korea

Area
  - Total: 3.53 km^{2} (1.36 sq mi)

Population (2001)
  - Total: 30,831
  - Density: 8,734/km^{2} (22,620/sq mi)

Korean name
- Hangul: 발산동
- Hanja: 鉢山洞
- RR: Balsan-dong
- MR: Palsan-dong

Balsan-dong (Korean: 발산동) is a dong (neighborhood) of Gangseo District, Seoul, South Korea.

== Overview ==
Balsan-dong derives its name from Sumeongsan Mountain, also known as Palyeosan or Balsan, which is said to resemble an overturned rice bowl. Due to this bowl-like shape, the mountain was called "Balsan" (鉢山), meaning "bowl-shaped mountain." The area was historically divided into two settlements: Naebalsan-dong ("Inner Balsan"), located within the mountain's interior, and Oebalsan-dong ("Outer Balsan"), situated outside of it.

The name "Balsan" appears in the Sinjeung Dongguk Yeoji Seungnam, a geographic compendium from the Joseon Dynasty. At the time, the region was part of Naebalsan-ri and Oebalsan-ri within Gagok-myeon, Yangcheon-hyeon, in Gyeonggi Province. These villages are also recorded in the Hoguchongso, a historical census register, where they are listed under Gabaegok-myeon in the same jurisdiction.

== See also ==
- Administrative divisions of South Korea
