= 2010 Eocheong boat collision incident =

Maritime incident in the Yellow Sea

Coordinates: 36°07′41″N 125°57′20″E

The 2010 Eocheong boat collision incident occurred on December 18, 2010, off Eocheong Island in the Yellow Sea. About 50 Chinese trawlers were illegally fishing about 120 kilometers off the island of Eocheong. A South Korean Coast Guard ship shot the fishermen with water cannons to move them back. When the coast guardsmen began boarding the ship to detain the fishermen, the trawler intentionally collided with one of the Korean coastguard patrol boats.

When the coastguard boarded the vessel, the fishermen attacked them with blunt objects from around the boat (such as oars, tools etc.). Four Korean coastguard officers were injured in the altercation, one fisherman died, and two went missing. Though eight boats and four helicopters later searched for the missing fishermen, they were never found. The fisherman who died fell unconscious after the collision and went into a coma, dying at a hospital in Gunsan.

== South Korean Reactions ==
South Korea's initial reaction to this incident was to find the missing fisherman, which they never did. Republic of Korea Coast Guard launched an additional 18 ships and two helicopters to combat the fishing directly. After this, they planned to increase the minimum bail for trawlers caught. At the time, the maximum bail that could be imposed on an illegal trawler was about US$44,600, which was raised to over $153,000. Since then, the maximum bail has increased even further to around $448,000. The bail is only one aspect to the financial devastation that South Korea seeks to impose upon poachers. The South Korean government added an additional fine of three times the catch's value. In the years following this incident, the South Korean government has ramped up their measures to combat the illegal fishing. In 2016 the United Nations Command began to run patrols in conjunction with the ROK, and later that year they began opening fire upon Chinese fishing boats. These incidents continue to occur today. In 2021, the South Korean government seized over 100 Chinese fishing boats violating the established regulation, and although China agreed to those regulations, poaching still occurs rampantly.

== Chinese Reactions ==
Like South Korea, China's initial reaction was to find the missing person. Beijing sent a rescue ship out to cooperate in a joint mission with China Maritime Search and Rescue Center, which again resulted in nothing. After the investigation, China demanded compensation for the missing person and the deceased captain. This demand was not answered. China did, however, receive the other fisherman without having to pay bail or other fines they would have otherwise accumulated.

China's behavior towards illegal fishermen, however, has remained indifferent. Although they have engaged in several acts to discourage their fishermen from trespassing, they appear to be largely symbolic. The truth of the matter is that China's growing demand for seafood, as well as the expanse of their political power in the world, are incentivising continued encroachments into Korean waters. Although the violation of the agreed terms between China and South Korea are blatant, the private nature of the poachers allows China to maintain a minimal level of responsibility for their actions. This allows Chinese fishermen to act as they please, despite the risks involved with illegally fishing in South Korea.

== China-South Korea Yellow Sea Fishing Disputes ==
China has become one of the most important economic powers of the world, and their relations to neighboring countries has thus been growing increasingly complex. Since 1998, China has been disputing the terms and conditions of a fisheries agreement with South Korea, and in 2001 the two parties entered their first agreement which regulated exclusive economic zones (EEZs). The 2001 Fisheries Agreement set clear boundaries as to where fishing was allowed and where it was not. In addition to clearly defining the borders under which fishing can be done, the agreement gave both governments the power to conserve and manage fishing based on a joint fisheries commission. This, however, did not satisfy many Korean fishermen, as the agreement creates a large provisional measure zone (PMZ) in the Yellow Sea, which is dominated by Chinese fishermen. These Chinese fishermen would often cross the border of the agreed PMZ and begin fishing in Korean waters. Under the conditions of the 2001 Fisheries Agreement, China would be responsible to prevent violations such as this. China and South Korea would disagree as to where the PMZ begins and ends, and while the situation had gotten better since 1998, tensions were far from eased.

China claims that their jurisdiction extends 200 nautical miles based on their exclusive economic zone and the Convention on the Continental Shelf.

One of the larger points of bilateral tension is the Chinese naval incursions into South Korean territory. The Chinese navy trespassed 112 times in 2017 and 243 times the following year, the goal of which is to normalize Chinese presence to incrementally consolidate their rights in the Yellow Sea area. The benefits of this would be the expanded fishing territory for Chinese fishermen to exploit for resources. The Ministry of Oceans and Fisheries estimates that around US$1.1 billion is lost every year to illegal fishing, and that is on top of the money that South Korea spends to combat the poaching in the first place. South Korea's attempts to control the constant Chinese presence in their waters include administrative and diplomatic efforts. China has cooperated to some extent to reduce the illegal fishing, including joint patrols in the Yellow Sea and the seizure of ships and equipment. Efforts such as these have reduced the rate of illegal fishing from 21.1% in 2016 to 9.9% in 2019. This is simply not good enough for many South Korean fishermen, who believe that China has not complied with the terms of the 2001 Fisheries Agreement. The ideal for South Korea would be to maintain a single boundary to simply define the areas for commercial fishing, whereas China would likely prefer to maintain the existing agreement, with its ambiguity and all, or adopt a new, equally vague, agreement.

== See also ==
- Bombardment of Yeonpyeong
- ROKS Cheonan sinking
- Sino-North Korean Mutual Aid and Cooperation Friendship Treaty
