= 2013 in North Korea =

- Centuries: 20th; 21st
- Decades: 1990s; 2000s; 2010s; 2020s
- See also: Other events of 2013; Years in North Korea; Timeline of Korean history 2013 in South Korea

The following lists events that happened in 2013 in the Democratic People's Republic of Korea. In 2013, tensions between North Korea and South Korea, the United States, and Japan escalated because of United Nations Security Council Resolution 2087, which condemned North Korea for the launch of Kwangmyŏngsŏng-3 Unit 2. The crisis was marked by increased rhetoric by the new North Korean administration under Kim Jong-un and actions suggesting imminent nuclear attacks against South Korea, Japan, and the United States.

== Incumbents ==
- First Secretary of the Workers' Party of Korea: Kim Jong-un
- Premier: Choe Yong-rim (until 1 April), Pak Pong-ju (starting 1 April)

== Events ==
=== January ===
- January 1 – First Secretary of the Workers' Party of Korea Kim Jong-un makes a rare New Year broadcast, calling for an improved economy and a reunified Korea.
- January 22 – The United Nations Security Council passes Resolution 2087, condemning North Korea's December 2012 rocket launch and expanding economic sanctions against the country.
- January 24 – North Korean authorities announce a new nuclear weapon and long-range missile test, threatening their publicly manifested arch-enemy, the United States, as their primary target.
- January 25 – North Korea threatens to take "strong physical countermeasures" if South Korea co-operates with new United Nations Security Council resolutions against it.
- January 29 – Google expands its Google Maps map data coverage of North Korea, updating what had been blank in most of that country's satellite images, for its search engine.
- January 31 – South Korean media reports claim that North Korea has been placed under martial law with another nuclear test considered to be imminent.

=== February ===
- February 12 – North Korea confirms that it has successfully tested a nuclear device, claiming that it is small enough to be weaponized. The South Korean officials report that an "artificial earthquake" has occurred in North Korea suggesting that a nuclear test has occurred. The test was widely condemned internationally. The Secretary-General of the United Nations, Ban Ki-moon, condemned the test, and called it a "clear and grave violation" of Security Council resolutions.
- February 15 – 2013 North Korean nuclear test
  - In reaction to North Korea's latest nuclear test the European Union will tighten sanctions against the country in the form of blocking the trade of gold and diamonds, as well as cracking down on financial ties between them.
  - North Korea tells China that it is prepared to stage one or even two more nuclear tests this year in an effort to force the United States into diplomatic talks.
- February 19 – North Korea threatens the "final destruction" of South Korea during a United Nations conference on disarmament.

=== March ===
- March 7 – 2013 North Korean nuclear test
  - North Korea threatens its enemies with the possibility of a pre-emptive nuclear strike, amplifying its threatening rhetoric.
  - The United Nations Security Council approves unanimously new sanctions against North Korea for its recent nuclear test.
  - During Foal Eagle, an annual training exercise conducted between South Korea and the United States, North Korea threatened to abandon the Korean Armistice Agreement, arguing the exercises threatened North Korea with nuclear weapons and that the U.S. was unwilling to negotiate a peace treaty to replace the armistice. JoongAng Ilbo reported that American vessels equipped with nuclear weapons were participating in the exercise. The U.S. Department of Defense publicly announced that U.S. Air Force B-52 bombers from Andersen Air Force Base in Guam flown over South Korea were reaffirming the U.S.'s "nuclear umbrella" for South Korea.
- March 8 – North Korea ends all peace pacts with South Korea and closes the main Panmunjom border crossing inside the Korean Demilitarized Zone. North Korean generals affirm they are aiming their long range missiles at the U.S. mainland in retaliation for the recently approved U.N. sanctions.

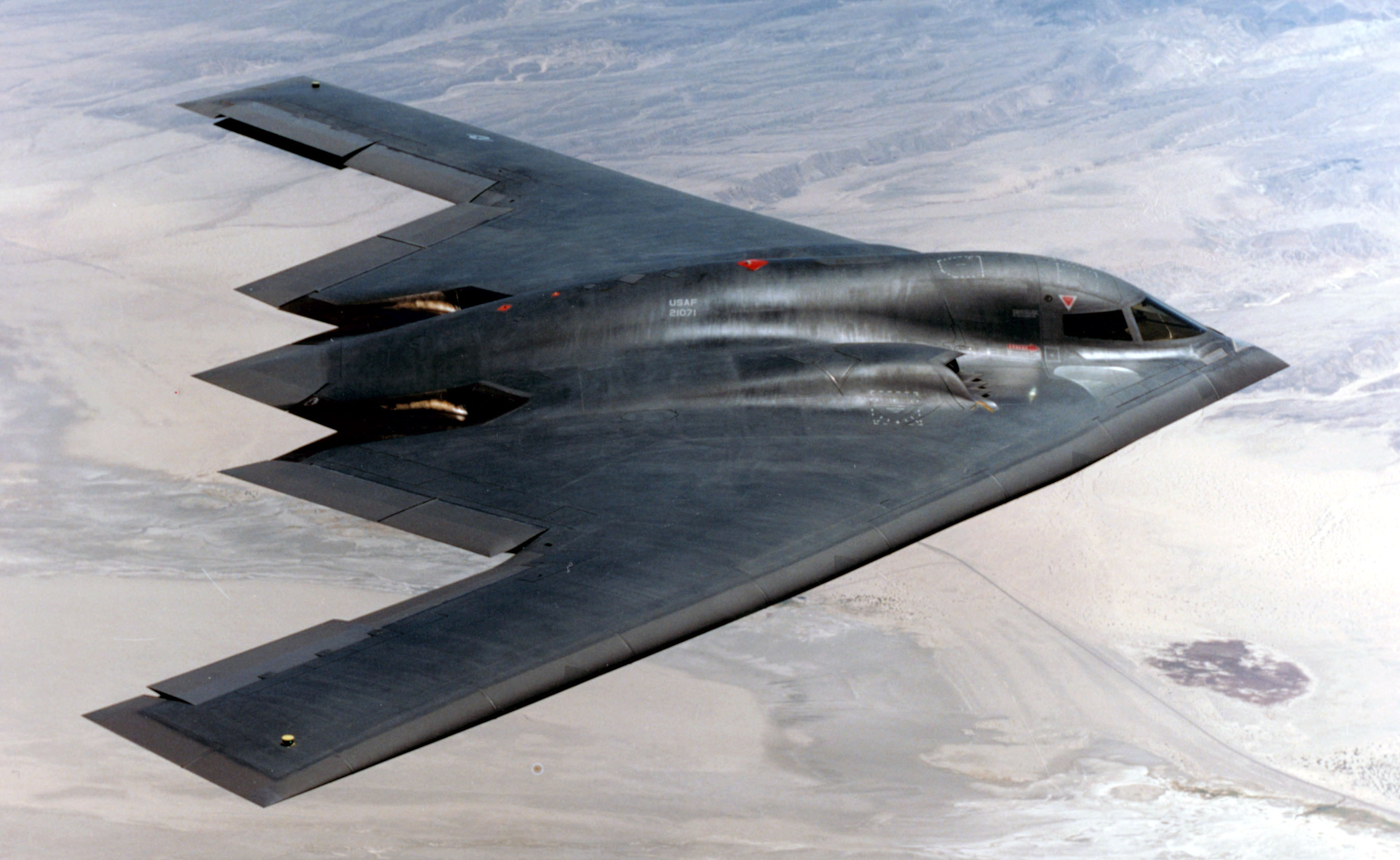
In response to two nuclear-capable American B-2 stealth bombers flying over the Korean peninsula on March 28, 2013, North Korea threatened the United States with their readiness to launch a rocket.

- March 13 – North Korea confirmed it ended the 1953 Korean Armistice Agreement, declaring that North Korea "is not restrained by the North-South declaration on non-aggression" and warned that the next step was an act of "merciless" military retaliation against its enemies.
- March 15 – United States Secretary of Defense Chuck Hagel announced that the U.S. will add 14 more Ground-Based Interceptor (GBI) missiles, one of the key components of the Ground-based Midcourse (GMD) ballistic missile defense system, at Fort Greely, Alaska, boosting the total number of GBI missiles from 30 back to the 44 planned by the Bush administration. Currently, 30 GBI missiles are based at two sites in the U.S., four at Vandenberg Air Force Base in California, and 26 at Fort Greely in Alaska. The U.S.'s GMD program uses land-based missiles to intercept incoming ballistic missiles in the midcourse phase of their flight, outside the earth atmosphere. GMD is designed to defend against intercontinental ballistic missiles (ICBMs). In contrast, the well-known land-based Patriot system with Patriot PAC-3 missiles or the new land-based Terminal High Altitude Area Defense (THAAD) system (as well as the sea-based Aegis Ballistic Missile Defense system) is designed to defend against theatre ballistic missiles (TBMs) including short-range (SRBM), medium-range (MRBM), and intermediate-range (IRBM) missiles. Admiral James A. Winnefeld, Jr., Vice Chairman of the Joint Chiefs of Staff also expressed his concern over the threat of North Korea's KN-08 ICBMs, telling reporters at the Pentagon on March 15 that this ICBM has emerged as a threat "a little bit faster than we expected." KN-08 missiles were first displayed on 16-wheel carrier trucks during a 2012 military parade, but there are doubts about their authenticity. In addition, Secretary Hagel said that the U.S. is planning to deploy an additional AN/TPY-2 radar, a part of GMD ballistic missile defense system in Japan. This second radar will provide improved early warning and tracking of any missile launched from North Korea at the U.S. or Japan. A first land-based AN/TPY-2 radar was positioned in northern Japan and has been operational since 2006, a second installation was scheduled to be emplaced in central Japan.
- March 16 – U.S. Secretary of Defense Chuck Hagel announced that Fort Greely in Alaska might have to be expanded to protect the United States from potential threats from Iran and North Korea.
- March 20 – There was a cyber attack against South Korea which added to tensions. It was later confirmed by the South Korean government that North Korea was behind the attack.
- March 26 – The U.S. again dispatched B-52 bombers from Guam to overfly South Korean territory as part of the ongoing Foal Eagle exercise. These flights were, according to US Department of Defense sources, routine flights intended to demonstrate America's capability of maintaining a "continuous bomber presence" in the region.
  - Japan was to deploy three Japanese Maritime Self-Defense Force (JMSDF) destroyers equipped with Aegis Ballistic Missile Defense system (Aegis BMD) according to Japanese media. Citing unnamed government officials, Japanese news reports said 2 of the destroyers would depart from Sasebo Naval Base in Nagasaki Prefecture, and head for the East China Sea. One of these ships from Sasebo was confirmed as the JDS Chokai (DDG-176). A third destroyer would deploy from Maizuru, Kyoto Prefecture, and head for the Sea of Japan. These warships could either be Kongo class or Atago class guided-missiles destroyers or both. All three ships are equipped with the RIM-161 Standard Missile 3 (SM-3) Block IA, a missile co-developed by and purchased from the U.S., according to Lt. Choji Yoshida, spokesman for the JMSDF Sasebo district headquarters. Japan also moved Patriot PAC-3 missile batteries to Okinawa to intercept a North Korean missile should any piece of it approach Japanese territory or waters.
- March 27 – Confirmation of the severing of the hotline between the North and the South—the last remaining communication link between the two countries at that time—was publicly announced, the same date that the hotline was cut off. According to the Korean Central News Agency, a senior North Korean military official stated: "Under the situation where a war may break out any moment, there is no need to keep up North-South military communications" prior to the cessation of the communication channel.
- March 28 – Two U.S. Air Force B-2A Spirit stealth bombers flew roundtrip from Whiteman Air Force Base in Missouri to the skies over the Korean Peninsula where they unloaded inert munitions on a South Korean bombing range. Flying nonstop with the assistance of in-flight refuelers, Pentagon officials called this mission a clear demonstration of "the United States' ability to conduct long range, precision strikes quickly and at will". A flight of seven B-1B Lancer bombers was also deployed to Andersen Air Force Base in Guam.
- March 28 - The international hotel chain Kempinski announced that it was cancelling plans to open the Ryugyong Hotel. The tallest building in Pyongyang, the hotel has been under construction since 1987, but has never opened.
- March 30 – North Korea declared a 'state of war' against South Korea. A North Korean statement promised "stern physical actions" against "any provocative act". North Korean leader Kim Jong-un declared that rockets were ready to be fired at American bases in the Pacific. This was in response to two nuclear-capable American B-2 stealth bombers flying over the Korean peninsula on March 28. The day before North Korea's declaration, the United States Department of Defense said, "The United States is fully capable of defending itself and our allies against a North Korean attack. We are firmly committed to the defense of South Korea and Japan."
- March 31 – Two U.S. Air Force F-22A Raptor stealth fighters were deployed to Osan Air Base, the main U.S. Air Force base in South Korea, from Kadena Air Base in Okinawa, Japan. The aircraft are on static display at Osan Air Base as part of the Foal Eagle exercise to provide bilateral training for the US and the Republic of Korea military and to provide South Korean senior leaders with an orientation to the aircraft, which are an advanced capability available for the defense of South Korea," Pentagon spokesman George Little said on April 1.

=== April ===
Estimated maximum ranges for North Korean missiles

- April 2 – North Korea said it would restart a nuclear reactor capable of producing plutonium at the Yongbyon Nuclear Scientific Research Center, which was closed after six-party talks in 2007.
  - The IT webzine BGR carried an article stating that hacker group Anonymous had started Operation North Korea, calling for 'controversial leader Kim Jong-un [to] resign', 'install free democracy' 'abandon its nuclear ambitions', 'uncensored Internet access', etc. The hackers also proclaimed that if the North Korean government does not accede to their demand, they will wage "Cyber War."
- April 3 – North Korea closed entry to the Kaesong Industrial Region to South Koreans. The South Koreans already there were allowed to leave (most stayed voluntarily to continue working). The Kaesong Industrial Region remaining open had previously been seen as a sign that the crisis was not as serious as the rhetoric suggested. The New York Times reported following the closure that "The fate of Kaesong is seen as a crucial test of how far North Korea is willing to take its recent threats against the South. Its continued operation was often seen as a sign that Pyongyang's verbal militancy was not necessarily matched by its actions." Kaesong was briefly closed three times in 2009.
  - The Pentagon ordered a U.S. Army Terminal High Altitude Area Defense (THAAD) advanced ballistic missile defense battery to be deployed to Guam within the next few weeks. The THAAD missile is designed to intercept the Theatre Ballistic Missile (TBM), and consists of a SRBM, a MRBM, and an IRBM. It intercepts missiles during the descent phase at an altitude higher than the current U.S. Army shorter range Patriot missile, that can intercept a TBM only during the terminal (final) phase of flight. U.S. Navy Arleigh Burke-class guided-missile destroyer USS Decatur equipped with the Aegis Ballistic Missile Defense System (Aegis BMD) also was sent to the Western Pacific near the Korean Peninsula, to join another destroyer, USS John S. McCain, to perform a ballistic missile defense mission in response to growing threats. A third destroyer, USS Fitzgerald, is also available. These ships are capable of carrying RIM-161 Standard Missile 3 (SM-3) Block IA anti-ballistic missiles (ABMs). The latest generation of Standard missile, the RIM-174 Standard Missile 6 (SM-6) or Standard Extended Range Active Missile (Standard ERAM), with its advanced active radar seeker, can also be deployed on these warships. SM-6 is capable of defending against a TBM in their terminal phase of flight at an altitude up to 33 kilometres (108,000 ft) and is now superseding RIM-156 Standard Missile 2 Extended Range (SM-2ER) Block IV as U.S. Navy terminal phase TBM interceptor. The Navy received the SM-6 into service in February 2013. U.S. Department of Defense spokesman George Little denied reports that a Sea-Based X-band radar (SBX radar), a floating radar used to track an adversary's missiles as part of a Ground-based Midcourse Defense (GMD) ballistic missile defense system, was being deployed to the waters off Japan, saying no decisions had been made about what would be done with the radar once at-sea testing in the region was finished.
  - The North Korean military said it had "ratified" a merciless attack against the United States, potentially involving a "cutting-edge" nuclear strike, and that war could break out "today or tomorrow".
- April 5 – Multiple countries, including the United Kingdom, Russia, and Sweden (who provides limited consular services for the United States in North Korea), were warned by North Korea that they should evacuate their embassies by April 10. The UK embassy stated they had no plans to do so.
  - South Korea dispatched two Sejong the Great-class guided-missile destroyers equipped with Aegis combat system to watch both sides of the peninsula for a possible North Korean missile launch Yonhap news agency reported, citing Republic of Korea (ROK) Navy official sources. These ships are outfitted with the powerful AN/SPY-1D radar capable of detecting ballistic missiles and accurately tracking their trajectories as soon as North Korea launches them. However they cannot yet intercept the incoming ballistic missiles using their primary air defense weapon consisting of 80 RIM-66 Standard Missile 2 Medium Range (SM-2MR) Block IIIA and IIIB missiles. There are no confirmed reports that South Korea had bought RIM-156 Standard Missile 2 Extended Range (SM-2ER) Block IV missile, the newer version of Standard missile capable of intercepting ballistic missiles during their terminal phase of flight. SM-2ER Block IV has been deployed on U.S. Navy guided-missiles cruisers and destroyers equipped with Aegis combat system for many years. With North Korea prepared for launching missiles and South Korea placing naval destroyers on its coasts, tensions in the Korean peninsula remain at a heightened state. Anticipating the upcoming North Korea's missile test the U.S. set to deploy a RQ-4 Global Hawk Unmanned Aerial Vehicle (UAV) surveillance aircraft to Japan to boost surveillance capabilities over North Korea. The Global Hawk will be stationed at Misawa Air Base in northern Japan. The U.S. military informed Japan last month about plans to deploy the plane between June and September but may bring the date forward, it said, following reports about North Korea's preparations for missile launches.
- April 6 – The Foreign Ministry of Germany stated that their embassy in Pyongyang will continue working, but it will be evaluated regularly for security and exposure. The United Kingdom reassured that they are staying and Sweden and France have also stated that they have no plans for evacuation. However Russia is considering the evacuation of staff due to the tensions.
- April 7 – The Pentagon announced that the Minuteman III missile test at Vandenberg Air Force Base, which was planned for April 9, would be postponed. The test was not associated with the North Korea crisis, but the United States decided to hold off "given recent tensions on the Korean Peninsula," said a Department of Defense official.
- April 9 – North Korean workers did not report to work at the Kaesong industrial zone. The North Korean Government removed 50,000 workers from the Kaesong industrial park, which effectively shut down all activities.
  - North Korea warned all foreign companies and tourists in South Korea to evacuate, stating that the two nations were on the verge of nuclear war.
- April 20 – North Korea accepted China's offer for dialogue.
- April 26 – South Korea announced that it would withdraw its remaining workers from the Kaesong Industrial Region to protect their safety after the North Korean government rejects talks.
- April 29 – All but seven South Korean workers leave the Kaesong Industrial Region.
- April 30 – The annual Foal Eagle joint military drills between South Korea and the United States came to a close with both nations continuously monitoring the situation on the Korean peninsula.

=== May ===
- May 1 – North Korea's Supreme Court sentenced Kenneth Bae to 15 years hard labor for "committing hostile acts". North Korea provided no evidence against Bae but it was reported by multiple news organisations that he had taken pictures of starving North Korean children.
- May 3 – The remaining seven South Korean workers at Kaesong Industrial Region left. The Kaesong Industrial Complex, the last symbol of inter-Korean relations, was shut down. North Korea stated that South Korea was fully culpable for the shutdown, and claimed that any finished products left at the Kaesong Complex would belong to the North.
- May 15 – The Industrial and Commercial Bank of China, Agricultural Bank of China, and China Construction Bank, three of the Big Four banks of China, halted all financial transactions between China and North Korea. The fourth Big Four bank, the Bank of China, had taken the same step several days before.
- May 18 – North Korea launched three short-range guided missiles into the Sea of Japan. The first two missiles were shot in the morning, while the third was in the afternoon. The missiles were launched from the same location where two missiles had been displayed, fueled, and then removed weeks before.
- May 19 – North Korea launched a fourth rocket that landed in the Sea of Japan.
  - Jiang Yaxian, Chinese counselor to North Korea, told the state news agency Xinhua that North Korea had seized a Dalian-based private vessel in waters between China and the Korean peninsula on the evening of May 5. The owner of the ship, Yu Xuejun, and Chinese authorities are seeking the boat's release. Chinese state media reported that North Korea is demanding 600,000 yuan (US$97,600) for the safe return of the ship and its crew of 16.
- May 20 – North Korea launched short-range projectiles that landed in waters off the country's eastern coast.
  - After Chinese protests, North Korea releases 16 fishermen after demanding a ransom.

=== June ===
- June 6 – It was reported that North Korea proposed official talks with South Korea regarding the Kaesong Industrial Region. The South Korean government immediately accepted the proposal.
- June 19 – China and North Korea called for the resumption of six-party talks.

=== July ===
- July 3 – North Korea restored the Seoul–Pyongyang hotline.
- July 6 – Following a 15-hour meeting on the North Korean side of Panmunjom, six North and South Korean officials agreed on the reopening the Kaesong industrial complex.

=== August ===
- August 14 – Delegates signed a five-point plan in regard to the reopening of the Kaesong Industrial Complex. A date for the recommencement of operations at the complex was not announced.

=== September ===
- September 10 – The South Korean Ministry of Unification announced in a press release that Kaesong would reopen on September 16, 2013, for a limited "test run".

=== October ===
- October 8 – North Korea put its army on alert and warned the United States of a "horrible disaster".
- October 21 – North Korea warned South Korea of "merciless firing" if it continued to develop non-explosive shells that contain anti-Pyongyang leaflets.

=== November ===
- November 12 – senior North Korean official Kim Tae-gil threatened the United States, South Korea and Japan with a "nuclear catastrophe".

=== December ===
- December 12 – Jang Song-thaek, Kim Jong Un's uncle is executed.

== Deaths ==
- February 17 – Kim Rak-hui, Vice Premier of North Korea (b. 1933).
- November 5 – Kim Pyong-ryul, President of the Supreme Court of North Korea (b. 1930).
- December 12 – Jang Song Thaek, Vice Chairman of the National Defense Commission (b. 1946).
- December 13 – Kim Kuk-thae, Chairman of the Inspection Commission of the Workers' Party of Korea (b. 1924).
