= 2012 in Korea =

2012 in Korea may refer to:

- 2012 in North Korea
- 2012 in South Korea
