= 2015 in Korea =

2015 in Korea may refer to:

- 2015 in North Korea
- 2015 in South Korea
