= 2012 in North Korea =

- Centuries: 20th; 21st
- Decades: 1990s; 2000s; 2010s; 2020s
- See also: Other events of 2012; Years in North Korea; Timeline of Korean history 2012 in South Korea

The following lists events that happened in 2012 in North Korea.

== Incumbents ==
- First Secretary of the Workers' Party of Korea: Kim Jong-un (since 11 April)
- Premier: Choe Yong-rim

== Events ==
=== February ===
- February 29 - A meeting with the U.S. in Beijing has North Korea apparently agreeing to suspend its Yongbyon uranium enrichment operations, invite IAEA monitors, and refrain from launching long-range missiles and nuclear testing, in exchange for American food aid, which immediately falls apart following an immediate rocket launch and the appearance of ICBM trucks at a Pyongyang military parade.

=== April ===
- April 11 - Kim Jong Un was elected First Secretary of the Workers' Party of Korea, and his father, Kim Jong Il, was given the appellation "Eternal General Secretary of the Workers' Party of Korea".
- April 12 - Despite warnings by U.S. President Barack Obama that Jong-Un has nothing to gain from provocations, Pyongyang proceeds to launch a satellite launching rocket, which disintegrates in mid-air.

=== August ===
- Kim visits the Kaemori artillery unit in recognition of the second year anniversary of the November 23, 2010 bombardment of Yeonpyeong, reminding them to be ready to fight a “sacred war” against Seoul, ahead of a USAF/ROKAF annual war games exercises to be conducted. Jong-Un calls the exercises; a “war rehearsal” to invade.

=== October ===
- Pyongyang claims to have developed missiles that can reach the U.S. mainland.

=== December ===
- Pyongyang announces plans to launch another satellite into space. The launch is delayed by two days due to technical issues, the satellite is successfully launched. Pyongyang declares the mission a success.
