= 2009 in Korea =

2009 in Korea may refer to:

- 2009 in North Korea
- 2009 in South Korea
