= 2011 in North Korea =

- Centuries: 20th; 21st
- Decades: 1990s; 2000s; 2010s; 2020s
- See also: Other events of 2011; Years in North Korea; Timeline of Korean history 2011 in South Korea

Events in the year 2011 in North Korea.

== Incumbents ==
- Premier: Choe Yong-rim
- Supreme Leader: Kim Jong-il (until 17.12.11), Kim Jong-un (starting 17.12.11)

== Events ==
=== January ===
- January 6 - South Korea dismisses an offer of unconditional talks by North Korea, saying the offer was part of a propaganda campaign.

=== February ===
- February 9 – The first military talks with South Korea in months abruptly end with the North walking out.

=== July ===
- 2011 North Korean local elections

=== November ===
- November 24 - A day after ROKF hold military exercises on Yeonpyeong Island in recognition of the first anniversary of the Bombardment of Yeonpyeong, Pyongyang threatens; “a sea of fire” upon the South’s presidential office.

=== December ===
- December 17 – Kim Jong-il dies of a heart attack and Kim Jong Un is declared "Supreme Leader of the National Defence Commission, Supreme Commander of the Korean People’s Army" and General Secretary of The Korean Worker's Party and promoted to four-star general and appointed the vice chairman of the Central Military Commission of the Workers’ Party at a Pyongyang rally which Jong Un accepts with passionate emotions. Ill-fated half brother and de-facto heir Kim Jong-Nam was also in attendance at the rally.

== Deaths ==
- December 17 - Kim Jong-il
