= 2010 in Korea =

2010 in Korea may refer to:

- 2010 in North Korea
- 2010 in South Korea
