= List of active ships of the Korean People's Navy =

This is a list of active ships of the Korean People's Navy, the naval service of North Korea. Most of the list includes ships of North Korean Origin. Yet, it also contains types that are less frequently used, with their origins from the former communist countries of the Soviet Union, and China. In late years, the production of lightly armored, yet mobile and maneuverable small PT Torpedo Boats increased, as well as patrol and landing craft used in case of national emergency. Submarines, on the other were costly, hard to manufacture. The corvettes of the Korean People's Navy were all outclassed by the 2000s and new ones are still under way.

== Submarines ==
Type	Class	Country of origin	In service	Notes	Photo
Diesel-electric submarine	Sinpo/Gorae-class	North Korea	2	First vessel in shipyard 2014, Experimental Ballistic Missile Submarine. May also be known as 'Gorae' (Whale class). Some reports suggests as many as six boats are being built, although others indicate that this is a single ship class for missile launch development only. Second submarine launched in September 2023.	
Diesel-electric coastal submarine	Sang-O-class	North Korea	40	Manufactured in two variants, 34m Sang-O and 39m Sang-O II. 40 Sang-O I and 6 Sang-O II in operation. 1 Sang-O I captured by ROK. North Korean Special Operation Force uses specially equipped Sang-O for missions.	
Diesel-electric midget submarine	Yono-class	North Korea	36	Iran operates a variant as the Ghadir-class submarine	
Diesel-electric submarine	Type-033	China	20	KPA Journal reported that these are being phased out in favor of Sang-O/Sang-O II. One has been modified to launch ballistic missiles. Sold as kits from China and was assembled in North Korea. Used by North Korean Special Operation Force for special maritime missions.	

== Destroyers ==
Type	Class	Country of origin	In service	Notes	Photo
Destroyer	Choe Hyon-class	North Korea	2	First ship commissioned on April 25, 2025. At the launch of the second ship it was announced that two more were approved for construction. Second ship of the class launched on June 12, 2025 and commissioned on September 7, 2026	

== Frigates and corvettes ==
Type	Class	Country of origin	In service	Notes	Photo
Light frigate	Najin-class	North Korea	2+	Old vessels, one was modernized in 2014	
Corvette	Amnok-class	North Korea	2	Allegedly built using Krivak class hull. Has 8 Kumsong-3 (KN-19) anti ship missiles, 6 FN-6 SAM missiles, 1 76mm gun, 2 AK-230 anti air guns, 4 533mm torpedoes and 4 RBU-1200 anti submarine rocket launchers	
Corvette	Nampo-class	North Korea	2	One more likely under construction. Also called Tuman class.	
Corvette	Sariwon-class	North Korea	5	Based on Tral-class	
Corvette/minesweeper	Fugas-class minesweeper	Soviet Union	1	Ex-Т-2 Tros (c. 1935) transferred 1953. Probably in reserve due to old age.	

Note: Satellite images from 2007 indicate that the empty hull of a Krivak-class frigate was purchased by North Korea around 2003. The ship was likely bought from a Russian scrap dealer, lacking any weapons or radar upon purchase. While it was assumed that North Korea purchased the hull for scrap metal, it remains in its original state for nearly five years, and has been transported from Wonsan to Nampo Harbor.

== Torpedo boats and missile craft ==
Type	Class	Country of origin	In service	Notes	Photo
SES Stealth missile boat	Nongo class	North Korea	7		
PTG missile craft	Soju class	North Korea	10		
PTG missile craft	Huangfeng class	China	4		
PTG small missile boat	Komar class	Soviet Union	6		
PT small torpedo boat	Sin Hung class torpedo boat / Ku Song class torpedo boat	North Korea	84		
Semi sub torpedo boat	Daedong class torpedo boat	North Korea	3		

== Patrol boats ==
Type	Class	Country of origin	In service	Photo
PG gun patrol boat	T Class patrol boat	North Korea	N/A	
PG gun patrol boat	Mayang class patrol boat	North Korea	N/A	
PC large coastal patrol boat	Taechong class I/II patrol boat	North Korea	12	
PC large coastal patrol boat	Hainan class	China	6	
PC/PT/PTG/WPC coastal/torpedo/armed patrol boat	Chong-Ju class patrol boat	North Korea	6	
PC coastal patrol boat	SO-1 class patrol boat	Soviet Union	19	
Coastal patrol boat	Shanghai 2 class	China	13	
PC small coastal patrol boats	Sinpo class (Steel version of Pr. 183)	North Korea	18	
Patrol boat	Chongjin class (Pr. 183 with ZIS-S-53 and two 2M-5)	North Korea	54	
attack crafts	Chaho class (Based on Pr. 183 torpedo boats)	North Korea	59	

== Utility/landing craft ==
Type	Class	Country of origin	In service
LCU utility landing craft	Hantae class	North Korea	
LCM medium landing craft	Hungnam class	North Korea	15
LCU medium landing craft	Hanchon class	North Korea	36
LCPA amphibious landing craft	Kong Bang class I/II/III	North Korea	
LCP Landing Craft, Personnel	Nampo class	North Korea	
PT assault torpedo boats	Chong Jin class - based on Chaho class	North Korea	
LCPA amphibious landing craft	Nampo class A/B	North Korea	48
LCVP Landing Craft, Vehicle and Personnel	Nampo class	North Korea	
ACV assault hovercraft	Kongbang class	North Korea	
Minesweeping boats	Yukto class	North Korea	
Fleet Ocean Tugboat	AT/F	North Korea	
WPB coastal cutters	Yongdo class	North Korea	
WPB coastal cutters	N/A	North Korea	
ASR Submarine rescue ship (Catamaran-hulled rescue/salvage ship)	Kowan class	North Korea	1
AS - Submarine tender	N/A	North Korea	1
Ocean AGHS - Patrol Combatant Support Ship	N/A	North Korea	1
Inshore AGHS - Patrol Combatant Support Ship	N/A	North Korea	30
Very slender vessels	Nalchi class	North Korea	

== Naval Aviation ==
Only 4 ships in the KPN have aviation capability with Nampo-class corvette and two Choe Hyon-class destroyers the only active ships with facilities. The rotary aircraft would likely be the Mil Mi-4 PL Mil Mi-14 PL (ASW) and are flown by Korean People's Army Air and Anti-Air Force.

== See also ==
- List of North Korean merchant ships
