= List of North Korean merchant ships =

This is an incomplete list of 123 North Korean merchant ships with a gross tonnage of approximately 420,000 gt.

In February 2015, press reports indicated that Ocean Maritime Management Company, which controls North Korean merchant shipping, has renamed at least some of these ships to avoid international sanctions. Several front companies in Hong Kong also act as owners for DPRK-flagged ships. These include "Trendy Sunshine Hong Kong Limited," "SBC International," "Advance Superstar (Hong Kong) Limited" and "Shen Zhong International Shipping."

== List ==
Name	IMO number	Type	Length	Gross tonnage	Notes
Al Iman	7712975	Livestock Carrier	101 m (331 ft)	3,556	
An Song	8513883	General Cargo	98 m (322 ft)	5,512	
Bassant	6421581	Livestock Carrier	61 m (200 ft)	943	
Bei Si Te 1	9089401	General Cargo	78 m (256 ft)	1,746	
Bu Gang	7909164	General Cargo	118 m (387 ft)	2,982	
Bu Hung	7516424	General Cargo	107 m (351 ft)	5,386	
Chang Dok	8020252	General Cargo	90 m (295 ft)	2,496	
Cheng Hai	9036533	General Cargo	77 m (253 ft)	1,479	
Chong Chon Gang	7937317	Bulk Cargo	155 m (509 ft)	9,147	renamed Tong Hung San. Seized by Panama authorities.
Chong Gen	8862155	General Cargo	131 m (430 ft)	6,558	Sunk off the coast of Japan.
Chong Jin 2	7628241	General Cargo	163 m (535 ft)	13,087	
Chong Ryon San	7803839	General Cargo		7,644	
Chong Ryu 2	8891845	General Cargo		427	
Courageous	Unknown	Products tanker	Unknown	3,900	Seized in Cambodia in April 2021.
Ja Ryok	9826952	General Cargo	99 m (325 ft)	5,000	
Chong Un San 1	8977900	Oil Products Tanker	50 m (164 ft)	498	
Chun Yang 8	8661290	General Cargo	113 m (371 ft)	4,818	
Chun Yang 9	8652756	General Cargo	90 m (295 ft)	2,355	
Dae Bong 1	8408193	General Cargo	84 m (276 ft)	2,514	
Dai Hong Dan	7944695	Bulk Cargo	131 m (430 ft)	6,390	
Dong Fang Qi Yung	9095412	Bulk Cargo	98 m (322 ft)	2,996	
Fortune Star 7	8326022	General Cargo	82 m (269 ft)	1,599	Scrapped
Hae Do Ji	8316326	Bulk Cargo	172 m (564 ft)	17,183	
Hao Fan 6	Unknown	Bulk Cargo	140 m (459 ft)	8,343	Owned by "Trendy Sunshine Hong Kong Limited"
Hoe Ryong	9041552	General Cargo	96 m (315 ft)	4,157	
Hu Chang	8330815	Cargo	131 m (430 ft)	6,706	
Hua Dong 7	8749200	General Cargo	96 m (315 ft)	2,986	perhaps Puy Yun 2?
Hung Gyong	8825664	Bulk Cargo	69 m (226 ft)	1,113	
Hung Tae 1	8604541	General Cargo	90 m (295 ft)	2,383	
Hwang Chol 1	7431117	General Cargo	76 m (249 ft)	1,540	
Hwanggumphong 2	8520719	General Cargo	73 m (240 ft)	1,417	renamed Hwang Gum Phyong 2
Hyok Sin 2	8018900	Bulk Cargo	181 m (594 ft)	14,929	
Jang San	8328599	Bulk Cargo	130 m (427 ft)	6,499	perhaps Jan Su San?
Jaryok	unknown	General Cargo	unknown	5,000	
Jie Shun	8518780	General Cargo	97 m (318 ft)	2,825	
Ji Song 3	8106094	General Cargo	72 m (236 ft)	1,798	
Ji Song 5	9063146	General Cargo	83 m (272 ft)	1,580	
Ji Song 6	8898740	Bunkering Tanker	70 m (230 ft)	841	
Ji Song 7	8622634	General Cargo		1,018	
Ji Song 8	8503228	General Cargo	106 m (348 ft)	3,953	
Ji Song 9	8627658	General Cargo	77 m (253 ft)	1,103	
Ji Song 10	9525845	General Cargo		1,798	
Ji Song 12	8103250	General Cargo	73 m (240 ft)	1,499	
Jin Hung	9095747	General Cargo	98 m (322 ft)	3,300	
Jin Hung 8	8416023	General Cargo	93 m (305 ft)	3,548	
Jin Teng	9163166	General Cargo	105 m (344 ft)	4,355	Seized by Philippines. Released on grounds of Chinese ownership. As of August 2016, it was Belize-flagged, renamed Sheng Da 8, and owned by Blue Ocean Ship Management of Weiha, China.
Kang Nam 1	8922436	General Cargo	86 m (282 ft)	702	
Kang Nam 3	8151415	Oil Products Tanker		823	
Kang Nam 5	8626006	General Cargo	60 m (197 ft)	1,135	
Kang Nam 6	8323812	General Cargo	73 m (240 ft)	1,319	
Kang Nam 7	8132304	General Cargo	71 m (233 ft)	1,314	
Kang Bong	8994245	General Cargo	80 m (262 ft)	1,366	
Kum Pit	9022362	General Cargo	69 m (226 ft)	1,296	
Kum Pit 1	8613578	Aggregate Carrier	51 m (167 ft)	928	
Kum Pit 2	8731497	Dredge		1,131	
Kum Pit 28	8989874	General Cargo	220 m (722 ft)	498	
Kum Pit 34	8731502	Aggregate Carrier		629	
Kum Pit 35	8731514	Aggregate Carrier		655	
Kum Song	8518962	General Cargo	79 m (259 ft)	1,551	
Kum San Bong	8810384	General Cargo	70 m (230 ft)	1,449	
Kum Un San	8720436	Oil Products Tanker	77 m (253 ft)	1,023	
Kwang Pho	8029806	General Cargo	65 m (213 ft)	999	
Lian Shun 9	8651221	General Cargo	98 m (322 ft)	2,971	
Man Gyong Bong 92	8890580	Ferry	126 m (413 ft)	9,672	
Man Pung	7432953	General Cargo	160 m (525 ft)	10,209	
Mi Rim	8713471	General Cargo	96 m (315 ft)	2,549	
Mi Yang 1	8031653	General Cargo	87.6 m (287 ft)	1,982	
Mi Yang 5	8620454	General Cargo	99 m (325 ft)	2,657	
Mi Yang 6	8828927	General Cargo	99 m (325 ft)	2,612	
Mi Yang 7	8303214	General Cargo	103 m (338 ft)	3,249	
Mi Yang 8	8863733	General Cargo	85 m (279 ft)	2,700	
Mi Yang 9	9092563	General Cargo	73 m (240 ft)	1,126	
Mu Bong 1	8610461	Oil Products Tanker	73 m (240 ft)	Unknown	
Mu Du Bong (a.k.a. Ryong Bong 1)	8328197	General Cargo	131 m (430 ft)	Unknown	seized by Mexican authorities
O Ka San	8735924	Container Ship	81 m (266 ft)	1,861	
Paek Sa Bong	8882002	Fish Carrier	98.6 m (323 ft)	2,932	
Paek Song 2	8416009	General Cargo	71 m (233 ft)	1,174	
Pe Gae Bong	8328616	General Cargo	131 m (430 ft)	6,500	
Pho Thae	7632955	General Cargo	145 m (476 ft)	9,959	
Pho Thong Gang	8829555	General Cargo	131 m (430 ft)	6,558	
Pi Ryu Gang	8829593	General Cargo	131 m (430 ft)	6,582	
Pom San	9534652	General Cargo	98 m (322 ft)	2,998	
Su Ri Bong	8605727	Bulk Carrier	174 m (571 ft)	17,275	In 2020 reported to be the largest ship in the fleet; still in service as of 2023.
Puk Song 1	7910383	General Cargo	39 m (128 ft)	283	
Puk Song 2	8312813	General Cargo	70.6 m (232 ft)	1,189	
Ra Nam 1	7433268	General Cargo	141 m (463 ft)	9,053	
Ra Nam 2	8625545	General Cargo	90 m (295 ft)	2,390	
Ra Nam 3	9314650	General Cargo	81 m (266 ft)	2,259	
Rak Won	7319814	General Cargo		9,826	
Rak Won 2	8819017	General Cargo	158 m (518 ft)	12,215	
Rung Ra 1	8713457	General Cargo	75 m (246 ft)	1,444	
Rung Ra Do	8226040	General Cargo	71 m (233 ft)	1,499	Built 1983; decommissioned.
Rung Ra Do	8989795	General Cargo	50 m (164 ft)	498	Built 1998; active.
Ryo Myong	8987333	General Cargo	84 m (276 ft)	3,566	
Ryong Gang 2	7640378	General Cargo	142 m (466 ft)	9,027	
Ryong Gun Bong renamed Chol Ryong	8606173	General Cargo	131 m (430 ft)	6,735	Subject to UN Sanctions
Ryon Phung	9154189	Oil Products Tanker	89 m (292 ft)	1,979	
Sai Nal 2	8651398	General Cargo	97 m (318 ft)	2,981	
Sa Ja Bong	8826046	General Cargo	127 m (417 ft)	6,399	
Sam Il Pho	8829567	General Cargo	131 m (430 ft)	6,675	
Sea Blue	7358638	General Cargo	78 m (256 ft)	1,936	
Sea Mist	7000932	General Cargo	76 m (249 ft)	1,371	
Son Bong 1	8221222	General Cargo	61 m (200 ft)	979	
Song Bong	8739372	General Cargo	131 m (430 ft)	1,744	
Song Gwang	8992778	General Cargo	106 m (348 ft)	3,962	
Song Gwang Ryon	8106800	General Cargo	89 m (292 ft)	2,393	
Sultan 1	9361081	Landing Craft	67 m (220 ft)	497	
Tae Dok San	8627804	General Cargo	71 m (233 ft)	1,254	
Tae Gong Gang	7738656	General Cargo	150 m (492 ft)	9,010	
Thae Song 1	8732037	General Cargo	69 m (226 ft)	1,150	
Tong Chong	8829579	General Cargo	131 m (430 ft)	6,099	
Tu Ru Bong	8882040	General Cargo	83 m (272 ft)	2,736	
Tu Ru Bong 1	8891869	General Cargo		298	
Tu Ru Bong 3	8891871	General Cargo		299	
Ul Ji Bong	8214516	General Cargo	71 m (233 ft)	1,301	
Ul Ji Bong 2	8035788	General Cargo	69 m (226 ft)	1,227	
Un Ha	7627027	General Cargo		498	
Wise Honest	8905490	Bulk Carrier	176 m (577 ft)	17,061	Seized by the Americans in May 2019 and sold for scrap.
Won San 2	9159787	General Cargo	86 m (282 ft)	2,654	
Woory Star	8408595	General Cargo	89 m (292 ft)	3,154	
Xin Zhou 2	8652823	General Cargo	98 m (322 ft)	3,390	
Xoh Paek	7374888	General Cargo	102 m (335 ft)	3,597	
Yang Gak Do	7929774	Refrigerated Cargo	70 m (230 ft)	1,238	
Yang Gak Do 3	8305872	General Cargo		1,112	
Yang Gak Do 7	8832227	Research		189	
Yang Gak Do 9	8328587	General Cargo	77 m (253 ft)	1,578	
Yon Bong	9089114	General Cargo	82 m (269 ft)	1,830	
Yu Jong 1	8405311	Crude Oil Tanker	70 m (230 ft)	1,038	
Yu Jong 2	8604917	Oil Products Tanker	63 m (207 ft)	748	
Zo Kwang	8125363	General Cargo	71 m (233 ft)	1,292	

== Re-flagging ==
Nearly 50 North Korean flagged ships have been re-flagged to the flag of Tanzania since March 2016, because of the new UN sanctions.

== See also ==
- List of active North Korean ships
- North Korea Maritime Administration
- Rajin University of Marine Transport
