= 2011 in Korea =

2011 in Korea may refer to:

- 2011 in North Korea
- 2011 in South Korea
