= 2014 in Korea =

2014 in Korea may refer to:

- 2014 in North Korea
- 2014 in South Korea
