= 2015 in North Korea =

- Centuries: 20th; 21st
- Decades: 1990s; 2000s; 2010s; 2020s
- See also: Other events of 2015; Years in North Korea; Timeline of Korean history 2015 in South Korea

Events from the year 2015 in North Korea. The year marks the 70th anniversary of the founding of the Workers' Party of Korea. The year was celebrated as the year of DPRK-Russia friendship.

== Incumbents ==
- First Secretary of the Workers' Party of Korea: Kim Jong-un
- Premier: Pak Pong-ju

== Events ==
=== January ===
- January 2 – The United States enacts financial sanctions on the North Korean Special Operation Force and 10 government officials in retaliation for the Sony Pictures Entertainment hack.

=== February ===
- February 7 – North Korea test fires a new "ultra-precision" intelligent anti-ship missile which is to be deployed across its navy.

=== March ===
- March 2 – North Korea lifts restrictions on entry into the country imposed ostensibly to stop the spread of the Ebola virus.
- March 9 - A North Korean diplomat is caught smuggling $1.7M of gold bars into Bangladesh.

=== July ===
- 2015 North Korean local elections

=== August ===
- August 15 – North Korea adopts UTC+08.30, or Pyongyang Standard Time to "eliminate Western imperialism". The time was previously used by both Koreas until the enactment of UTC+09.00 in 1961.

== Elections ==
- 2015 North Korean local elections

== Deaths ==
- January 14 – Pyon In-son, politician and military officer (b. 1946).
- April 30 – Hyon Yong-chol, 12th Minister of National Defence (b. 1949).
- May 10 – Kim Kyok-sik, 10th Minister of National Defence (b. 1938).
- July 21 – Kang Nung-su, Vice Premier of North Korea (b. 1930).
- November 7 – Ri Ul-sol, former member of the National Defense Commission and Marshal of the Korean People's Army (b. 1921).
- December 29 – Kim Yang-gon, politician and a senior official of the ruling Workers' Party of Korea (b. 1942).
