= 2014 in North Korea =

- Centuries: 20th; 21st
- Decades: 1990s; 2000s; 2010s; 2020s
- See also: Other events of 2014; Years in North Korea; Timeline of Korean history 2014 in South Korea

The following lists events that happened in 2014 in North Korea.

== Incumbents ==
- First Secretary of the Workers' Party of Korea: Kim Jong-un
- Premier: Choe Yong-rim

== Events ==
=== January ===
- January 20 – Kenneth Bae, an American prisoner in North Korea, releases a message to the United States for help.

=== February ===
- February 5 – North Korea and South Korea hold meetings to discuss visitation reunions of families separated by the Korean War.
- February 7 – The United Nations' commission of inquiry on human rights in the DPRK publishes a landmark report, which concludes that the DPRK's government is perpetrating "unspeakable atrocities" against its own people on a vast scale and committing “widespread, systematic and gross” violations that amount to crimes against humanity.
- February 10 – North Korea withdraws an invitation to a United States envoy to discuss the release of Kenneth Bae.
- February 11 – Talks between North Korea and the United States occur, with North and South Korea scheduled to start high-level talks the next day.
- February 15 – A North Korean cargo ship is allowed to leave the Panama Canal.
- February 17 – A United Nations report accuses North Korea of atrocities and calls for an investigation by the International Criminal Court.
- February 19 – Botswana ends diplomatic relations with North Korea following a UN report on the latter's human rights record.

=== March ===
- March 3 – North Korea announces that it will release Australian Christian missionary John Short on account of his age.
- March 28 – South Korea captures a North Korean fishing boat that had crossed into their waters amid rising tensions between the two neighboring countries.
- March 31 – North and South Korea exchange artillery fire across sea boundaries.

=== April ===
- April 4 – South Korea test-fires a new ballistic missile with a range of 500 kilometres and hopes to extend its range to 800 kilometres so that it can reach anywhere in North Korea.
- April 4 – A Mongolian-flagged cargo ship sinks off the coast of South Korea, with most of the 16 North Korean crew members reported missing.
- April 25 – North Korea announces that it has detained a 24-year-old US tourist, Matthew Todd Miller, for "rash behavior" during the immigration process.
- April 29 – North Korea warns South Korea that it will conduct live firing near the disputed maritime border.

=== May ===
- May 9 – South Korea's Ministry of National Defense announces that three drones found in their territory came from North Korea.
- May 13 – An apartment block in Pyongyang containing 100 families collapses.
- May 18 – Officials report the collapse of a 23-story block of flats that is believed to have killed multiple residents, in a rare public apology.
- May 19 – An apartment building collapses in Pyongyang, with casualties estimated to be in the hundreds.
- May 22 – South Korean media reports that North Korea fired shells in a disputed area near a Republic of Korea Navy ship.

=== June ===
- June 6 – North Korea announces that it arrested an American tourist last month for alleged inappropriate behavior.
- June 17 – North Korean propaganda videos show that they have developed a cruise missile similar to the Russian Kh-35 model.
- June 30 – North Korea says it will put on trial two American tourists, Jeffrey Fowle and Michael Miller, for crimes against the state.

=== July ===
- July - A Russian-funded transshipment terminal in the northeastern port of Rajin.
- July 2 – South Korea reports that North Korea fired two short range missiles into the Pacific Ocean from the coastal city of Wonsan.
- July 3 – The government of Japan lifts some sanctions on North Korea following an agreement to re-investigate the fate of Japanese nationals abducted by North Korean agents in the 1970s and 1980s.
- July 9 – South Korea claims that North Korea has fired two short range missiles into the ocean to the east of the Korean Peninsula.
- July 13 – Japan's Defence Ministry claims that North Korea has fired two ballistic missiles into the Sea of Japan.
- July 14 – South Korea claims that North Korea has fired dozens of artillery shells into the sea near the disputed border.
- July 31 - The Carnegie Endowment for International Peace publishes a report pointing to the risk that the Russo-Ukrainian War could lead to selling defense technology in the black market that could advance the nuclear proliferation of North Korea.

=== September ===
- September 14 – North Korea holds a trial for American tourist Matthew Todd Miller who was detained in April and sentences him to six years of hard labor.
- September 26 – North Korea acknowledges that First Secretary of the Workers' Party of Korea Kim Jong-un is suffering from "discomfort", after a three-week absence from state media photographs.

=== October ===
- October 7 – There is an exchange of gunfire as a North Korean patrol boat breaches the South Korean western sea border.
- October 13 – Kim Jong-un, the leader of North Korea makes his first public appearance in five weeks.
- October 21 – North Korea releases American Jeffrey Edward Fowle five months after detaining him for leaving a Bible at a hotel.

=== November ===
- November 8 – North Korea releases American detainees Kenneth Bae and Matthew Todd Miller.
- November 13 – Cuba defends North Korea by circulating an amendment to a European-Japanese draft resolution recommending the referral of North Korea to the International Criminal Court for crimes against humanity.
- November 20 – North Korea threatens to conduct another nuclear test in response to a United Nations Human Rights Council resolution passed on Tuesday recommending the Security Council authorise a probe into human rights abuses.

=== December ===
- December 2 – The FBI launches a probe into a massive hacking attack on Sony Pictures, believing the leadership of North Korea to be responsible.
- December 2 – South Korea approves a plan by the Christian Council of Korea to set up a large Christmas tree near the border with North Korea despite ongoing tensions.
- December 3 – Transparency International issues its 2014 Corruption Perceptions Index with Denmark achieving the highest rating and North Korea and Somalia tied with the lowest ranking.
- December 19 – A South Korean court orders the dissolution of the Unified Progressive Party citing pro-North Korean stances.
- December 20 – Sony Pictures Entertainment hack
  - The North Korean government denies the U.S. Federal Bureau of Investigations's (FBI) accusation of involvement in hacking Sony's computers, asking the U.S. for a joint investigation and threatening "serious consequences" if the United States refuses the offer of cooperation.
  - The United States rejects the offer from North Korea and then seeks help from China instead.
- December 22 – North Korea experiences severe internet outages.

== Elections ==
- 2014 North Korean parliamentary election
