= 2010 in North Korea =

- Centuries: 20th; 21st
- Decades: 1990s; 2000s; 2010s; 2020s
- See also: Other events of 2010; Years in North Korea; Timeline of Korean history 2010 in South Korea

The following lists events that happened in 2010 in North Korea.

== Incumbents ==
- Premier: Kim Yong-il (until 7 June), Choe Yong-rim (starting 7 June)
- Supreme Leader: Kim Jong-il

== Events ==
- 3–5 May – North Korean leader Kim Jong Il made a state visit to China.
- 27 August – North Korean leader Kim Jong Il made a second state visit to China.
- 28 September – The 3rd Conference of the Workers' Party of Korea is held. This was the first national meeting of WPK after 30 years since 1980. Kim Jong Un, the third son of Supreme Leader Kim Jong Il was introduced and is designated as the successor to Kim Jong Il.
- 10 October – The 65th anniversary of the founding of the Workers' Party of Korea is held.
- 23 November – The bombardment of Yeonpyeong.

== Deaths ==
- 5 January – Pak Ki-so, former Commander of Pyongyang Defense Command (b. 1929).
- 17 March – Pak Nam-gi, former Director of the Planning and Finance Department of the Workers' Party of Korea (b. 1934).
- 28 April – Kim Jung-rin, member of the Politburo of the Workers' Party of Korea (b. 1923).
- 2 June – Ri Je-gang, First Deputy Director of the Organization and Guidance Department (b. 1930).
- 24 August – Kim Song-gyu, military officer and politician (b. 1933).
- 10 October – Hwang Jang-yop, 3rd Chairman of the Standing Committee of the Supreme People's Assembly, famously known for defecting to South Korea (b. 1923).
- 6 November – Jo Myong-rok, First Vice Chairman of the National Defense Commission (b. 1928).
