= 9th Presidium of the Workers' Party of Korea =

The 9th Presidium of the Workers' Party of Korea, officially the Presidium of the Political Bureau of the 9th Central Committee of the Workers' Party of Korea (Korean: 제9기 조선로동당 중앙위원회 정치국 상무위원회), was elected by the 1st Plenary Session of the 9th Central Committee on 23 February 2026.

== Members ==
The following were elected as members of the 9th Presidium.

The names of members are listed according to the order of their election at the 1st plenary meeting of the 9th Central Committee.

Rank	Name	Korean	8th (Note: Status in the Presidium at the end of the 8th Central Committee's term.)
1	Kim Jong Un	김정은	Yes
2	Pak Thae-song	박태성	Yes
3	Jo Yong-won	조용원	Yes
4	Kim Jae-ryong (Note: Kim Jae-ryong was recalled on 20 June 2026.)	김재룡	No
5	Ri Il-hwan	리일환	No
