= 8th Presidium of the Workers' Party of Korea =

The 8th Presidium of the Workers' Party of Korea, officially the Presidium of the Political Bureau of the 8th Central Committee of the Workers' Party of Korea (Korean: 제8기 조선로동당 중앙위원회 정치국 상무위원회), was elected by the 1st Plenary Session of the 8th Central Committee on 10 May 2021.

== Meetings ==
- Meeting: 17 May 2022

== Members ==
The following were elected as members of the 8th Presidium.

The names of members are listed according to the order of their election at the 1st plenary meeting of the 8th Central Committee. Members who have an en dash (—) in the Rank column were by-elected during the term of the 8th Central Committee.

Rank	Name	Korean	7th (Note: Status in the Presidium at the end of the 7th Central Committee's term.)	9th (Note: Status in the Presidium at its election at the start of the 9th Central Committee's term.)
1	Kim Jong Un	김정은	Yes	Yes
2	Choe Ryong-hae	최룡해	Yes	No
3	Ri Pyong-chol (Note: Ri Pyong-chol was recalled as a member in 29 June 2021. He returned as a member by being by-elected in April 2022.)	리병철	Yes	No
4	Kim Tok-hun (Note: Kim Tok-hun was recalled as a member on 24 December 2024.)	김덕훈	Yes	No
5	Jo Yong-won	조용원	No	Yes
—	Pak Jong-chon (Note: Pak Jong-chon was by-elected as a member on 2 September 2021, but was recalled on 28 December 2022.)	박정천	No	No
—	Pak Thae-song (Note: Pak Thae-song was by-elected as a member on 28 December 2024.)	박태성	No	Yes
