= 7th Presidium of the Workers' Party of Korea =

The 7th Presidium of the Workers' Party of Korea, officially the Presidium of the Politburo of the 7th Central Committee of the Workers' Party of Korea (Korean: 제7기 조선로동당 중앙위원회 정치국 상무위원회), was elected by the 1st Plenary Session of the 7th Central Committee on 10 May 2016.

== Meetings ==
- Meeting: 3 September 2017

== Members ==
The following were elected as members of the 7th Presidium.

The names of members are listed according to the order of their election at the 1st plenary meeting of the 7th Central Committee. Members who have an en dash (—) in the Rank column were by-elected during the term of the 7th Central Committee.

Rank	Name	Korean	6th (Note: Status in the Presidium at the end of the 6th Central Committee's term.)	8th (Note: Status in the Presidium at the start of the 8th Central Committee's term.)
1	Kim Jong Un	김정은	Yes	Yes
2	Kim Yong-nam (Note: Kim Yong-nam was recalled on 10 April 2019.)	김영남	Yes	No
3	Hwang Pyong-so (Note: Hwang Pyong-so was recalled as a member on 20 April 2018.)	황병서	Yes	No
4	Pak Pong-ju	박봉주	No	No
5	Choe Ryong-hae	최룡해	No	Yes
—	Kim Tok-hun (Note: Kim Tok-hun was by-elected as a member on 13 August 2020.)	김덕훈	No	Yes
—	Ri Pyong-chol (Note: Ri Pyong-chol was by-elected as a member on 13 August 2020.)	리병철	No	Yes
