= Maritime Administration (North Korea) =

North Korean maritime authority

- 조선민주주의인민공화국 국가해사감독국
- Abbreviation: MAB
- Type: Maritime administration
- Location: Pyongyang, Chung-guyok
- Coordinates: 39°0′N 125°44′E
- Website: www.ma.gov.kp

- Maritime Administration
- Chosŏn'gŭl: 국가해사감독국
- Hancha: 國家海事監督局
- Revised Romanization: Gukgahaesagamdokguk
- McCune–Reischauer: Kukkahaesagamdokkuk

Maritime Administration of DPR Korea (Korean: 국가해사감독국), also known as North Korea Maritime Administration Bureau (MAB), is the North Korean maritime authority.

MAB offers a searchable database for North Korean merchant navy ships and seafarers on its website. Unlike many other shipping databases, MAB offers its ship and person data without requiring registration or membership for access.

The director-general of MAB in 2012 was Ko Nung-du. He signed the notification for International Maritime Organization about the Kwangmyŏngsŏng-3 launch.

MAB has a sports team in the annual Paektusan Prize Games of Civil Servants.

== See also ==
- Rajin University of Marine Transport
