= Dai Hong Dan incident =

2007 ship hijacking in the Indian Ocean

- Part of piracy off the coast of Somalia
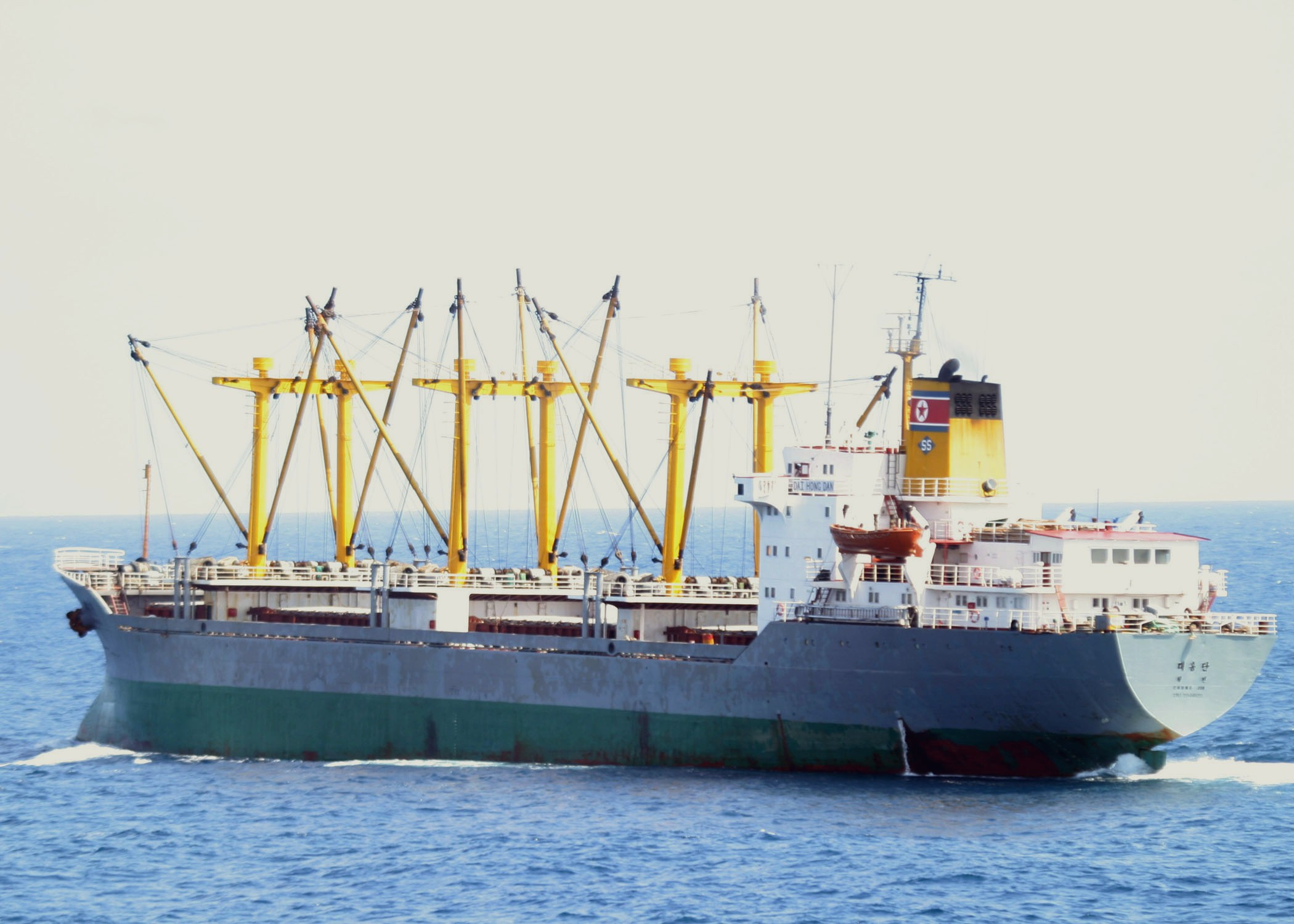
- The Dai Hong Dan during the incident
Date	29 October 2007
Location	Indian Ocean, off the coast of Mogadishu
Result	North Korean–US victory

Belligerents
North Korea; United States; United States Navy	Somali pirates

Commanders and leaders
Park Yong Hwan; Timothy R. Trampenau	

Strength
22 sailors 1 destroyer	7 pirates

Casualties and losses
3–6 wounded None	1–2 killed, 5 captured (3 wounded)

- Dai Hong Dan incident
- Hangul: 대홍단호 사건
- RR: Daehongdanho sageon
- MR: Taehongdanho sakŏn

On the evening of 29 October 2007, seven Somali pirates hijacked the North Korean cargo ship MV Dai Hong Dan (Korean: 대홍단호) in the Indian Ocean, approximately 110 kilometres (70 miles; 60 nautical miles) northeast of the Somali capital, Mogadishu. The Dai Hong Dan, with a crew of 22 sailors, had departed Mogadishu earlier that day after unloading a shipment of sugar with the help of locals, including the pirates. The pirates gained permission to board the ship under the pretense of being Somali security personnel. They subsequently confined the crew to the steering and engine rooms at gunpoint and demanded a ransom of US$15,000 for their release.

The following day, a US naval vessel, the Arleigh Burke-class destroyer USS James E. Williams, responded to a distress signal sent out by the Dai Hong Dan. The US Navy ordered the pirates to surrender via radio, which, according to the US Navy, prompted the crew of the Dai Hong Dan to rebel against their captors and regain control of their ship. A gunfight between the North Korean crew members and the Somali pirates left at least one pirate dead and three pirates wounded. US Navy medical personnel treated three wounded North Koreans, although the North Korean government later stated six of its sailors had been wounded in the incident.

North Korea's official account of events differed slightly from the US Navy's. According to the state-run Korean Central News Agency, the sailors had fought back from the start, but the pirates only surrendered upon the arrival of US forces. Following the incident, North Korea published a rare statement of gratitude to the US, thanking the US for its assistance and highlighting the two countries' successful collaboration.

== Background ==
Piracy was a major issue in the waters off the Somali coast in 2007; a total of 19 commercial ships had been hijacked by pirates that year. Many Somali fishermen had turned to piracy in response to illegal overfishing by foreign vessels and the inability of the transitional government to adequately respond.

The Dai Hong Dan was a North Korean cargo ship contracted to deliver general cargo to Mogadishu, the capital and largest port of Somalia. The ship docked in Mogadishu on 20 October 2007 and departed on 29 October after unloading all of its cargo – a shipment of sugar from India. At the time, the ship's crew was led by Park Yong Hwan, reportedly a Hero of Labour recipient who by then had captained the ship for 27 years.

The Dai Hong Dan was already known in South Korea due to an earlier incident on 4 June 2001, when the ship entered South Korean waters in the Jeju Strait en route from China to the North Korean port of Chongjin. A South Korean coast guard patrol boat informed the Dai Hong Dan that a North Korean vessel had not passed through the strait in five decades and prior notice was required to do so. The crew of the Dai Hong Dan responded that they believed the Jeju Strait was international waters and were unaware that prior notice was needed; the ship promptly left South Korean waters.

== Hijacking and rescue ==
According to the US Navy, the Dai Hong Dan was hijacked on the evening of 29 October 2007, about 110 kilometres (70 miles; 60 nautical miles) northeast of Mogadishu. A group of seven Somali pirates who had previously helped the North Koreans unload their cargo in Mogadishu approached the vessel on skiffs and convinced the crew to let them board by posing as Somali security personnel. Once aboard, the Somalis forced the 22-member North Korean crew at gunpoint into the steering and engine rooms and demanded a ransom of US$15,000. The crew was able to send out a distress signal before their confinement, which was received by the International Maritime Bureau based in Kuala Lumpur, Malaysia. After traveling for about 16 km (10 mi; 9 nmi), the pirates ordered the crew to sail toward their base in Harardhere, north of Mogadishu. However, two crew members managed to stop the ship by discreetly disabling the engine, telling the pirates it had broken down.

The US Navy Arleigh Burke-class destroyer USS James E. Williams, located 95 km (60 mi; 50 nmi) from the Dai Hong Dan, was patrolling the waters off the Horn of Africa and answered the signal the following morning. The destroyer, then under the command of Timothy R. Trampenau, deployed an SH-60B helicopter to investigate and set a course for the Dai Hong Dan once the helicopter team confirmed the situation. Upon arriving at the scene, the James E. Williams ordered the pirates to surrender via radio.

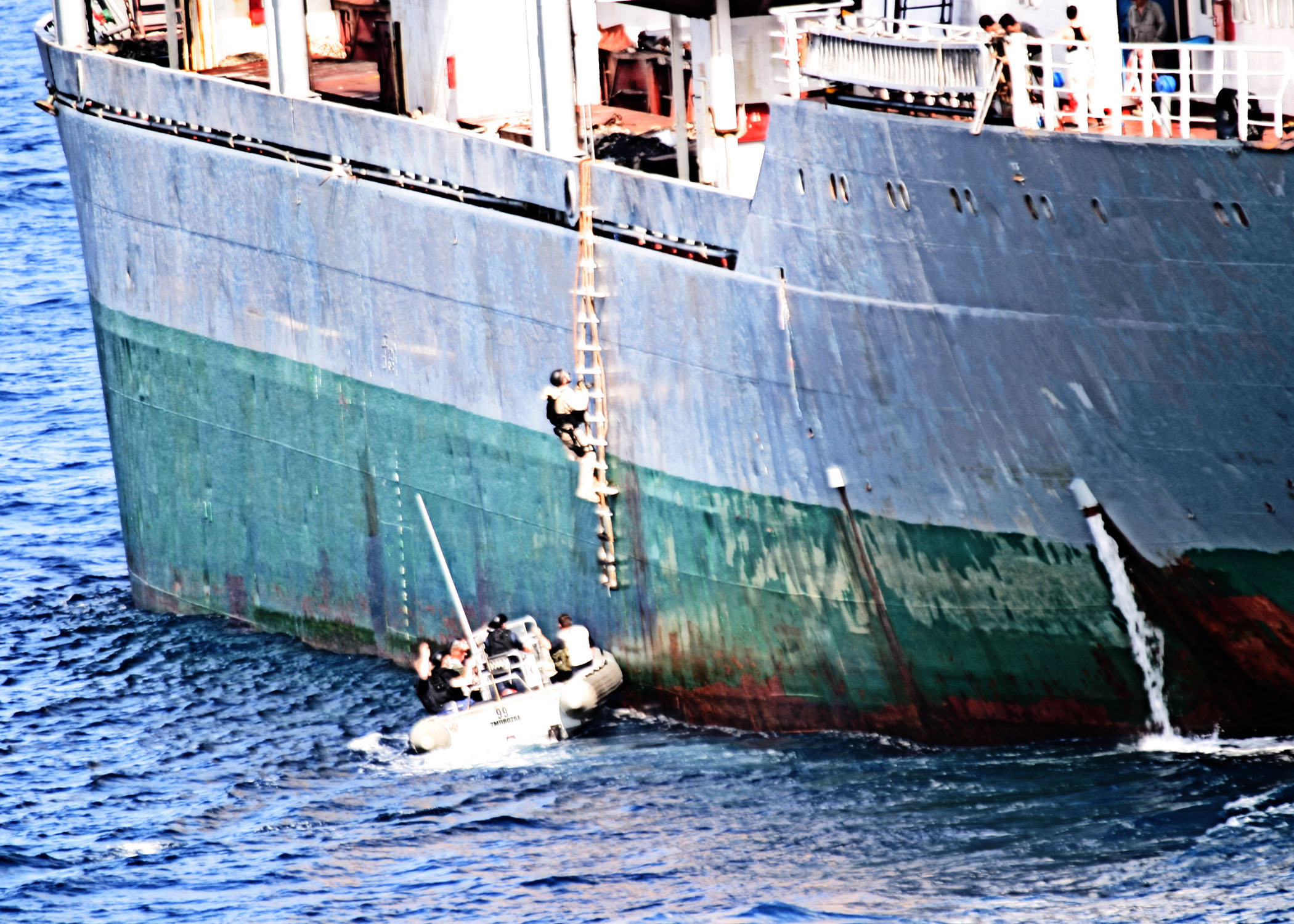
US Navy personnel boarding the Dai Hong Dan

According to the US Navy, their arrival had encouraged the North Korean sailors to revolt against their captors. The crew overpowered the pirates guarding the steering and engine rooms, seized their weapons, and stormed the bridge. A subsequent gunfight led to the deaths of two pirates and the capture of the remaining five, three of whom were wounded. After the pirates threw their weapons overboard, the James E. Williams dispatched a visit, board, search, and seizure team consisting of US Navy medical personnel and Roy Park, a second-generation Korean American who acted as an interpreter. The team boarded the Dai Hong Dan with the permission of its crew and transferred three wounded North Koreans to the James E. Williams for treatment before returning them to their ship.

The North Korean state-owned Korean Central News Agency (KCNA) gave a slightly different account of events. According to an official report published by the KCNA on 11 November 2007, the sailors had fought back from the onset of the hijacking, but the pirates did not surrender until the James E. Williams arrived. The report also stated that six North Koreans had been wounded and only one pirate had been killed.

== Aftermath and analysis ==
The KCNA report included a statement of gratitude from North Korea to the US and emphasized the two countries' successful collaboration against the pirates. The statement read:

We feel grateful to the United States for its assistance given to our crewmen. This case serves as a symbol of the DPRK–US cooperation in the struggle against terrorism. We will continue to render international cooperation in the fight against terrorism, in the future, too.

Two North Korean defectors have suggested that the crew of the Dai Hong Dan may have acted boldly due to pressure from their compatriots. A defector using the pseudonym Choi Myung Il claimed that North Korean crew members travelling overseas are usually accompanied by security agents who monitor them, and these agents may have ordered the crew to resist. He also claimed that the sailors would have lost their jobs and faced severe punishment upon returning home if North Korean authorities had been forced to intervene. Another defector using the pseudonym Kim Suk Hwan added that the crew members likely had "a good family background or powerful sponsors", as most North Koreans who board ships bound for international waters are related to officials in the Ministry of Land and Maritime Transportation.

== See also ==
- Maersk Alabama hijacking
- MV Samho Jewelry
- List of North Korean merchant ships
