= Maritime administrations =

Executive body to administer maritime responsibilities

Maritime administrations, or flag state administrations, are the executive arms/state bodies of each government responsible for carrying out the shipping responsibilities of the state, and are tasked to administer national shipping and boating issues and laws within their territorial waters and for vessels flagged in that country, or that fall under their jurisdiction.

The main functions are:

1. Government policy for ships and boating, marine safety in general, seaworthiness, safe construction and stability
2. Policing Dangerous goods being carried, Navigation safety, Safe manning, Certificates of Competency/licenses for crew
3. Health, safety and welfare of crew, civil search and rescue
4. Prevention and combating marine pollution and response, investigation of marine accidents
5. Represents country on IMO and other International Conventions

== National maritime organisations ==
- Australian Maritime Safety Authority
- Danish Maritime Safety Administration
- Maritime Administration (North Korea)
- Maritime Administration of Latvia
- Maritime and Coastguard Agency, United Kingdom
- Norwegian Maritime Authority
- Swedish Maritime Administration
- United States Coast Guard
- United States Federal Maritime Commission
- United States Maritime Administration
- International Registries

== See also ==
- International Maritime Organization
- European Maritime Safety Agency
