= Kang Nam 1 =

North Korean cargo ship

History

North Korea
- Name: Kang Nam 1
- Operator: Korea Kumrung Trading Corporation
- Builder: RSW Roßlauer Schiffswerft GmbH, Dessau-Roßlau, Germany
- Launched: 1989
- Identification: IMO number: 8922436; Call sign: HMYM8; MMSI number: 445331000
- Status: in active service, as of 2012

General characteristics
- Type: Cargo ship
- Tonnage: 702 GT; 2,080 DWT
- Length: 86 m (282 ft 2 in)
- Beam: 12 m (39 ft 4 in)
- Draught: 4 m (13 ft 1 in)

The Kang Nam 1 is a 2,000 ton North Korean cargo ship. It is one of a series of five vessels, owned by the North Korean government, named Kang Nam 1 through Kang Nam 5. According to South Korean media reports, the Kang Nam 1 itself was probably built in Germany in the late 1980s. It then passed through a series of owners to a South Korean maritime firm, which in turn sold it to North Korea. In the summer of 2009, the ship left North Korean waters and entered international waters, probably carrying military equipment bound for Burma while being monitored by the U.S. Navy, before it turned back and headed for North Korea.

== June/July 2009 events ==
The Kang Nam 1 came to international attention 17 June 2009, after leaving port in Nampo, North Korea and entered International waters. It began travelling South, along the Chinese coastline. A South Korean intelligence report fed speculation that the ship was destined for Myanmar (Burma) via Singapore with a cargo of weapons banned by the United Nations Security Council, which permits North Korean ships to be searched if suspected of carrying illegal cargo under Resolution 1874. Monitoring by the U.S. Navy began almost immediately, and the USS Lassen (DDG-82) began pursuit at some point after that. North Korea warned that forced inspection of the ship would be considered an "act of war". Singapore responded that it would "act appropriately" if the ship were to dock at its port. Burmese state media denied that the Kang Nam 1 was coming to dock there, but mentioned that a "rice-bearing" North Korean ship was due to dock at the end of the week.

The crisis took an unusual turn when, without explanation, sometime during 28–29 June, the Kang Nam 1 reversed its course. While the ship traveled back toward North Korea, several regional news agencies published more information about it and its possible mission. South Korean intelligence sources reported that the freighter was likely carrying North Korean-manufactured Soviet-era small arms such as AK-47 rifles and RPG-7 anti-tank launchers. An unnamed South Korean government source told the Yonhap News Agency that payment for the weapons from Myanmar's government were to take place via an unnamed bank in Malaysia, but had probably been stopped after a U.S. envoy visited Malaysia on 6 July to discuss the situation. Myanmar denied involvement with the ship or its cargo, and Malaysia insisted that it would not be involved in "money laundering" and would cooperate if provided any information on the alleged scheme.

The Kang Nam 1 eventually returned to its port of origin in North Korea, sometime between 6 and 8 July, attention on it largely displaced when North Korea fired seven test missiles during its return voyage.

== See also ==
- List of North Korean merchant ships
