= 6th Presidium of the Workers' Party of Korea =

The 6th Presidium of the Workers' Party of Korea (WPK), officially the Presidium of the Political Bureau of the 6th Congress of the Workers' Party of Korea, was elected by the 1st Plenary Session of the 6th Central Committee on 14 October 1980.

== Members ==
The following were the members of the 6th Presidium throughout its term.

=== Members elected in 1980 ===
The following were elected as members of the 6th Presidium at the 1st Plenary Meeting of the 6th Central Committee on 14 October 1980.

Rank	Name	Korean	5th PC (Note: Status in the Political Committee at the end of the 5th Central Committee's term.)	2010 (Note: Status in the Presidium at the plenary meeting of the 6th Central Committee on 28 September 2010.)	7th PRES (Note: Status in the Presidium at the start of the 7th Central Committee's term.)
1	Kim Il Sung (Note: Kim Il Sung died on 8 July 1994.)	김일성	Yes	No	No
2	Kim Il (Note: Kim Il died on 9 March 1984.)	김일	Yes	No	No
3	O Jin-u (Note: O Jin-u died on 25 February 1995.)	오진우	Yes	No	No
4	Kim Jong Il	김정일	Yes	Yes	No
5	Ri Jong-ok (Note: Ri Jong-ok was recalled as a member in March 1983.)	리종옥	No	No	No

=== Members elected in 2010 ===
The following were elected as members of the 6th Presidium at the plenary meeting of the 6th Central Committee on 28 September 2010.

Members who have an en dash (—) in the Rank column were elected during the remaining term of the 6th Central Committee.

Rank	Name	Korean	5th PC	1980 (Note: Status in the Presidium at the 1st Plenary Meeting of the 6th Central Committee on 14 October 1980.)	7th PRES
1	Kim Jong Il (Note: Kim Jong Il died on 17 December 2011.)	김정일	Yes	Yes	No
2	Kim Yong-nam	김영남	No	No	Yes
3	Choe Yong-rim (Note: Choe Yong-rim was recalled as a member on 31 March 2013.)	최영림	No	No	No
4	Jo Myong-rok (Note: Jo Myong-rok died on 6 November 2010.)	조명록	No	No	No
5	Ri Yong-ho (Note: Ri Yong-ho was recalled as a member on 15 July 2012.)	리영호	No	No	No
—	Kim Jong Un (Note: Kim Jong Un was elected as a member on 11 April 2012.)	김정은	No	No	Yes
—	Choe Ryong-hae (Note: Choe Ryong-hae was elected as a member on 11 April 2012. He was recalled on 18 February 2015.)	최룡해	No	No	Yes
—	Hwang Pyong-so (Note: Hwang Pyong-so was elected as a member on 18 February 2015.)	황병서	No	No	Yes
