= 2009 in North Korea =

- Centuries: 20th; 21st
- Decades: 1980s; 1990s; 2000s; 2010s; 2020s
- See also: Other events of 2009; Years in North Korea; Timeline of Korean history 2009 in South Korea

The following lists events that happened in 2009 in North Korea.

== Incumbents ==
- Premier: Kim Yong-il
- Supreme Leader: Kim Jong-il

== Events ==
- Daecheong incident

== Births ==
- 2 June – Hong Ryu-mi, footballer

== Deaths ==
- 15 January – Kim Ik-hyon, politician and military officer (b. 1916).
- 2 February – Han Song-ryong, member of the Politburo of the Workers' Party of Korea (b. 1923).
- 31 March – Hong Song-nam, 8th Premier of North Korea (b. 1929).
- 24 August – Jang Song-u, politician and general (b. 1933).
