= 2011 North Korean local elections =

Elections to provincial, municipal, city, county and district people's assemblies (도·시·군 인민회의 대의원 선거) were held in North Korea on July 24, 2011.

28,116 provincial, municipal, city, county and district people's assembly deputies were elected.

Voter turnout was reported as 99.97%, with candidates receiving a 100% approval rate. It was reported that Kim Jong Il voted at the sub constituency No.150 at Constituency 264 in Pyongyang City, where he cast his votes for Park Hyong Ryol (Head of factory for the Pyongyang Goksan (grain produce) factory) and Kang Chol ho (Head of factory for the Ryongsong egg processing factory). The election was the first time Kim Jong Un Voting for elections was reported on the North Korean news reports.
