= Kusong class torpedo boat =

North Korean class of torpedo boat

Class overview
- Name: Kusong class
- Operators: Democratic People's Republic of Korea

General characteristics
- Type: Torpedo Boat
- Displacement: 42 tonnes (41 long tons; 46 short tons) at full load
- Length: 18.3 m (60 ft)
- Beam: 3.4 m (11 ft)
- Height: 1.7 m (6 ft)
- Draft: 1 m
- Installed power: 2 x diesels 2,400 BHP
- Propulsion: 2 shafts
- Speed: 40 mph
- Armament: 2 × dual 14.5 mm MG; 2 × 450 mm (17.7 inch) torpedo tubes

The Kusong class torpedo boats are a North Korean class of torpedo boat. The Korean People's Navy is estimated to operate 60 of them.

== Specifications ==
The Kusong-class is armed with two 450 millimetres (18 in) torpedoes. They displace 42 tonnes (41 long tons; 46 short tons) at full load.

== Service history ==
During a Naval drill off Nampo, by the Korean People's Navy, on October 5, 2016, four Kusong-class torpedo boats were part of the 80 some training fleet.
