= 2015 North Korean local elections =

Elections to provincial (municipal), city (district) and county people's assemblies (도(직할시)·시(구역)·군 인민회의 대의원 선거) were held in North Korea on July 19, 2015.

Voter turnout was reported at 99.97%, with 28,452 deputies elected to local people's assemblies. It was reported by North Korean media that Kim Yong-nam voted at the sub constituency No.117 of Constituency No.62 in Pyongyang City, and Choe Ryong-hae voted at sub constituency No.169 in the same constituency Kim Yong-nam voted in. It was reported that Kim Jong Un cast his vote at the subconstituency No.102 in Constituency No.107 for Pyongyang City and Constituency No.102 for Sosong District, to Ho Myong Gum, who is a driver of the Yokjon workshop at the Ryonmot Trolley Bus Company running for the Assembly at Pyongyang City, and Sin suntae, who is head of the processing factory No.2 of the Kim Chong-t'ae Electric Locomotive Works and running for Sosong District.

== See also ==
- Elections in North Korea
