= Rajin University of Marine Transport =

North Korean technical university

- 라진해운대학
- Type: Public
- Established: July 1968; 58 years ago
- Location: Rason, Democratic People's Republic of Korea

Rajin University of Marine Transport is a North Korean technical university founded in July 1968 in Rason. It trains technicians, specialists and management officials in the field of marine transport.

== Noted alumni ==
- Kim Yong-il, former premier of North Korea

== See also ==
- List of universities in North Korea
- North Korea Maritime Administration
