= Kim Yong-il =

North Korean politician (born 1944)

- 김영일

10th Premier of North Korea
- In office 11 April 2007 – 7 June 2010
- Chairman: Kim Jong Il
- Preceded by: Pak Pong-ju
- Succeeded by: Choe Yong-rim

Personal details
- Born: 2 May 1944 (age 82) Kankyōnan Province, Korea, Empire of Japan
- Party: Workers' Party of Korea
- Education: Rajin University of Marine Transport

Korean name
- Hangul: 김영일
- Hanja: 金英日
- RR: Gim Yeongil
- MR: Kim Yŏngil

Kim Yong-il (Korean: 김영일; born 2 May 1944) is a North Korean politician who served as the Premier of North Korea from April 2007 to 7 June 2010. He was elected as Premier by the 5th session of the 11th Supreme People's Assembly (SPA) in April 2007, replacing Pak Pong-ju. He was then replaced by Choe Yong-rim after a rare parliamentary session on 7 June 2010.

He served in the Korean People's Army from 1960 to 1969, and then graduated from the Rajin University of Marine Transport as a navigation officer. He worked as an instructor and deputy director of a general bureau of the Ministry of Land and Marine Transport for 14 years.

He was the Minister of Land and Marine Transport from 1994 until his election as Premier in 2007. He oversaw the construction of new facilities at the Ryongnam Ship Repair Factory near the western port of Nampo, at the mouth of the Taedong River.

As Premier, Kim Yong-il was the head of government in the DPRK, which means he appointed ministers and vice-premiers, who were confirmed by the SPA, and he was also responsible for economic and domestic policy. Premier Kim's first major speech at the anniversary of the state's founding largely reinforced state ideology. However, on the economy, he carefully balanced demands for heavy industry with consumer goods, light industry, and agriculture: "We will firmly adhere to the socialist economic construction line of the military-first era and while developing the national defense industry first, we will vigorously ignite the flames of the agricultural revolution and the light industry revolution, thus the food problem and the issue of the people's consumer goods should be smoothly resolved".

Premier Kim Yong-il should not be confused with another Kim Yong-il (1955–2000?), the son of the late Kim Il Sung and half-brother of Kim Jong Il, who is said to have died in Germany in 2000, or Kim Yong-il who was Deputy Foreign minister.

== See also ==
- Politics of North Korea
