= General Secretary and Secretary of the Workers' Party of Korea =

Head of the Workers' Party of Korea (in North Korea)

The General Secretary and Secretary of the Workers' Party of Korea is a member of the Secretariat of the Workers' Party of Korea, which is headed by a General Secretary (the name of this office has changed throughout North Korean history).

== General Secretaries and forerunners ==
Title	Officeholder	Hangul	Birth	Death	Took office	Left office	Duration
First Secretary of the North Korean Branch Bureau	Kim Yong-bom	김용범	1902	1947	13 October 1945	18 December 1946	1 year and 66 days
First Secretary of the North Korean Branch Bureau	Kim Il Sung	김일성	1912	1994	18 December 1946	28 August 1946	2 years and 194 days
First Secretary of the Central Committee	Ho Ka-i	허가이	1900	1953	24 June 1949	2 July 1953	4 years and 8 days
Second Secretary of the Central Committee	Yi Sung-yop	이성엽	1905	1954	24 June 1949	6 August 1953	4 years and 43 days
Third Secretary of the Central Committee	Kim Sam-yong	김삼룡	1908	1950	24 June 1949	27 March 1950	276 days
General Secretary of the Central Committee	Kim Il Sung	김일성	1912	1994	12 October 1966	8 July 1994	27 years and 269 days
General Secretary of the Workers' Party of Korea	Kim Jong Il	김정일	1941	2011	8 October 1997	17 December 2011	14 years and 70 days
First Secretary of the Workers' Party of Korea	Kim Jong Un	김정은	1983	Alive	11 April 2012	9 May 2016	4 years and 28 days
General Secretary of the Workers' Party of Korea	Kim Jong Un	김정은	1983	Alive	10 January 2021	Incumbent	4 years and 304 days

== Secretaries ==
Rank (Note: Highest rank the individualattained during tenure. The rank does not include the head secretary. For instance, in the 6th Secretariat Kim Jong-il is ranked 1 in this list. Some other lists might rank him as 2 since Kim Il-sung served as General Secretary of the Central Committee.)	Name	Hangul	Birth	Death	Took office	Left office	Duration
9	An Seug-tak	안수탁	?	?	17 June 1983	?	?
10	Chae Hi-chong	채희총	?	?	17 June 1983	?	?
3	Choe Ryong-hae	최룡해	1950	Alive	28 September 2010	9 May 2016	5 years and 224 days
7	Choe Sang-gon	최상건	1953	Alive	10 January 2021	Incumbent	4 years and 304 days
2	Choe Thae-bok	김기남	1930	2024	27 December 1986	9 May 2016	29 years and 134 days
1	Choe Yong-gon	최용건	1900	1976	12 October 1966	19 September 1976	9 years and 343 days
—	Chon Pyong-ho	전병호	1926	2014	27 December 1986	28 September 2010	23 years and 275 days
7	Han Ik-su	한익수	1912	1978	13 November 1970	5 September 1978	7 years and 296 days
—	Han Son-yong	한성룡	1923	2009	12 December 1988	2009	38 years and 49 days
7	Ho Bong-hak	허봉학	?	?	12 October 1966	16 November 1968	2 years and 35 days
—	Ho Dam	허담	1929	1991	1 December 1983	11 May 1991	7 years and 161 days
7	Ho Jong-suk	허정숙	1908	1991	17 June 1983	5 June 1991	?
7	Hong Si-hak	홍시학	?	?	14 October 1980	1 December 1983	3 years and 48 days
10	Hong Sok-hyong	홍석형	1936	Alive	28 September 2010	June 2011	246 days
6	Hwang Jang-yop	황장엽	1923	2010	12 December 1979	24 February 1997	17 years and 74 days
8	Hyon Mu-gwang	현무광	1913	1992	13 November 1970	14 October 1980	9 years and 336 days
5	Hyon Mu-kwang	현무광	?	?	17 June 1983	?	?
1	Jo Yong-won	조용원	?	Alive	10 January 2021	Incumbent	4 years and 304 days
4	Jong Sang-hak	정상학	?	Alive	10 January 2021	Incumbent	4 years and 304 days
—	Kang Song-san	강성산	1931	1997	27 December 1986	?	
2	Kim Chung-nin	김중린	1923	2010	13 November 1970	10 December 1984	14 years and 27 days
2	Kim Chung-nin	김중린	1923	2010	9 January 1990	28 April 2010	20 years and 109 days
4	Kim Hwan	김영남	?	?	14 October 1980	17 June 1983	2 years and 246 days
2	Kim Il	김일	1910	1984	12 October 1966	14 October 1980	14 years and 2 days
1	Kim Jong Il	김정일	1942	2011	17 September 1973	8 October 1997	26 years and 329 days
6	Kim Jung-rin	김중린	1923	2010	30 June 1969	14 October 1980	11 years and 106 days
1	Kim Ki-nam	김기남	1929	2024	October 2007	9 May 2016	8 years and 221 days
—	Kim Kyong-hui	김경희	1946	Alive	11 April 2012	9 May 2016	4 years and 28 days
5	Kim Kwang-hyop	김광협	1915	1970	12 October 1966	July 1970	3 years and 262 days
8	Kim Phyong-hae	김평해	1941	Alive	28 September 2010	9 May 2016	5 years and 224 days
10	Kim To-man	김토만	?	1967	12 October 1966	8 April 1967	2 years and 35 days
5	Kim Tong-gyu	김동규	1915	?	13 November 1970	28 November 1978	8 years and 15 days
6	Kim Tu-il	김두일	?	Alive	10 January 2021	Incumbent	4 years and 304 days
7	Kim Yang-gon	김양건	1942	2015	28 September 2010	29 December 2015	5 years and 92 days
6	Kim Yong-il	김영일	1944	Alive	28 September 2010	9 May 2016	5 years and 224 days
8	Kim Yong-ju	김영주	1920	2021	12 October 1966	11–13 February 1974	7 years and 124 days
2	Kim Yong-nam	김영남	1928	2025	14 October 1980	17 June 1983	2 years and 246 days
—	Kim Yong-sun	김용순	1934	2003	23 May 1990	26 October 2003	13 years and 156 days
—	Kwak Pom-gi	곽범기	1939	Alive	11 April 2012	9 May 2016	4 years and 28 days
—	Kye Ung-tae	김영남	1920	2006	8 February 1986	23 November 2006	20 years and 288 days
4	Mun Kyong-dok	문경덕	1957	Alive	28 September 2010	9 May 2016	5 years and 224 days
4	O Jin-u	오진우	1917	1995	13 November 1970	14 October 1980	9 years and 336 days
—	O Su-yong	오수용	1944	Alive	11 February 2021	Incumbent	4 years and 272 days
3	Pak Kum-chol	박금철	1911	1967	12 October 1966	8 April 1967	178 days
—	Pak Nam-gi	박남기	1934	2010	12 December 1988	9 January 2010	21 years and 28 days
9	Pak Su-dong	박수동	?	?	14 October 1980	31 August 1982	1 year and 321 days
2	Pak Thae-song	박태성	1955	Alive	10 January 2021	Incumbent	4 years and 304 days
5	Pak To-chun	박도춘	1944	Alive	28 September 2010	9 May 2016	5 years and 224 days
9	Pak Yong-guk	박용국	?	?	12 October 1966	16 November 1968	2 years and 35 days
5	Ri Il-hwan	리일환	1960	Alive	10 January 2021	Incumbent	4 years and 304 days
3	Ri Pyong-chol	리병철	1948	Alive	10 January 2021	Incumbent	4 years and 304 days
6	Sok San	속산	?	?	12 October 1966	13 November 1970	4 years and 32 days
—	So Kwan-hui	서관희	1926	1997	6 October 1981	21 September 1997	15 years and 350 days
8	Son Kwan-hi	손관희	?	?	17 June 1983	?	?
9	Thae Jong-su	태종수	1936	Alive	28 September 2010	9 May 2016	5 years and 224 days
9	Yang Hyon-sop	양형섭	1925	2022	30 June 1969	14 October 1980	11 years and 106 days
4	Yi Hyo-sun	이효선	?	1967	12 October 1966	8 April 1967	178 days
—	Yi Kuk-chin	이국진	?	?	30 June 1969	13 November 1970	1 year and 136 days
6	Yun Ki-bok	윤기복	?	?	14 October 1980	17 June 1983	2 years and 246 days
6	Yun Ki-bok	윤기복	?	?	9 January 1990	?	?
