= Choe Yong-rim =

North Korean politician (born 1930)

- 최영림

11th Premier of North Korea
- In office 7 June 2010 – 1 April 2013
- Chairman: Kim Jong Il; Kim Jong Un
- Preceded by: Kim Yong-il
- Succeeded by: Pak Pong-ju

Personal details
- Born: 20 November 1930 (age 95) Ryanggang, Korea, Empire of Japan (now Kyŏnghŭng County, Ryanggang Province, North Korea) (Note: The source used only gives the province "Ryanggang" as Choe's place of birth and does not specify the kun. At the time of Choe's birth, Korea was ruled by Japan (see Korea under Japanese rule) and Ryanggang did not yet exist; it was only formed in 1954 out of 9 kun taken from South Hamgyŏng (Korean: Hamgyŏng namdo; Japanese: Kankyō nandō), 1 kun taken from North Hamgyŏng (H. pukto / K. hokudō) and 1 kun from Chagang Province, which was itself formed out of mainly North P'yŏngan (P'yŏngan pukto / Heian hokudō) and a bit of South Hamgyŏng territory.)
- Party: Workers' Party of Korea
- Education: Mangyongdae Revolutionary School
- Alma mater: Kim Il Sung University; Moscow State University

Korean name
- Hangul: 최영림
- Hanja: 崔永林; 崔英林
- RR: Choe Yeongrim
- MR: Ch'oe Yŏngnim

Choe Yong-rim (Korean: 최영림, born 20 November 1930) is a North Korean politician who served as the Premier of North Korea from June 2010 to April 2013 and was a member of the 6th Presidium of the Workers' Party of Korea. He has been described by The New York Times as a "KWP insider" and a "friend of Kim Jong Il's family." He was also honorary vice-president of the Presidium of the Supreme People's Assembly, the country's parliament.

== Career ==
Choe Yong-rim joined the Korean People's Army in July 1950. He attended Mangyongdae Revolutionary School, Kim Il Sung University, and Moscow University. Qualifying as an electrical engineer, he has held various offices since the 1950s, including: instructor, section chief, vice-department director, first vice-department director and department director of the Central Committee of the Workers' Party of Korea and chief secretary of the Secretaries Office of the Kumsusan Assembly Hall. He has also held posts of vice-premier of the Administration Council, director of the Central Public Prosecutors Office and secretary general of the SPA Presidium.

From 11 April 2005 to July 2009, he was secretary general (sŏgijang) of the Presidium of the Supreme People's Assembly, succeeding Kim Yunhyŏk. Choe was appointed chief secretary of the Pyongyang City Committee of the Workers' Party of Korea in 2009, taking a post left unoccupied for nine years since his predecessor Kang Hyun-su's death in 2000. He left the post when he was elected Premier of North Korea on 7 June 2010 at the 3rd Session of the 12th Supreme People's Assembly.

Choe was elected member of the 5-members 6th Presidium of the Central Committee of the Workers' Party of Korea at the Party Conference held in September 2010. Choe's adoptive daughter Choe Son-hui is the Minister of Foreign Affairs.

== Premiership ==
Choe succeeded Kim Yong-il as premier during a second parliamentary session in 2010. It was speculated that Kim was ousted partly because of the failed currency reforms, which took place in early 2010. According to the South Korean newspaper The Chosun Ilbo, he reportedly apologized publicly for the mishaps before stepping down. Kim's departure and Choe's elevation coincided with the dismissal of various other ministers in the cabinet who were ostensibly blamed for the failed reforms. The event was seen by analysts as achieving two purposes: settling public outcry over the currency valuation fiasco and engineering a political climate more favourable towards the succession of Kim Jong Un, the supreme leader's youngest son.

In February 2011, the North Korean media reported Choe's visit to a construction site. This was the first time the media had reported on a leadership figure other than the Supreme Leader conducting a solo guidance inspection. At the 7th Session of the 12th SPA on 1 April 2013, Choe was replaced as Premier of North Korea by Pak Pong-ju, as the assembly moved to the new strategy of building the economy and military simultaneously. Choe was given the title of honorary vice-president of the SPA Presidium, with Kim Yong-nam maintained as his supervisor in the President's role of the SPA until the retirement of both in April 2019.

== Notes ==
Party political offices
Preceded by Kang Hyun-su	Secretary of the Workers' Party of Korea in Pyongyang; 2009–2010	Succeeded by Mun Kyong-dok
Political offices
Preceded by Kim Yong-il	Premier of North Korea; 2010–2013	Succeeded by Pak Pong-ju
